= Laundry Service =

2001 studio album by Shakira

Studio album by Shakira
- Released: 5 November 2001
- Recorded: 1999–2001
- Studios: Crescent Moon (Miami); Criteria (Miami); Compass Point (Nassau)
- Genre: Pop rock
- Length: 49:14
- Languages: English; Spanish
- Label: Epic
- Producer: Shakira

Shakira chronology
MTV Unplugged (2000)	Laundry Service (2001)	Grandes Éxitos (2002)

Laundry Service: Washed and Dried

Singles from Laundry Service
- 1. "Whenever, Wherever" Released: 27 August 2001; 2. "Te Dejo Madrid" Released: 21 January 2002; 3. "Underneath Your Clothes" Released: 11 February 2002; 4. "Objection (Tango)" Released: 24 June 2002; 5. "Que Me Quedes Tú" Released: 11 November 2002; 6. "The One" Released: 16 December 2002

Laundry Service (Spanish: Servicio de Lavandería) is the fifth studio album and first English-language album by Colombian singer-songwriter Shakira. It was released on 5 November 2001, by Epic Records. After her fourth studio album Dónde Están los Ladrones? (1998) became a success, Shakira was encouraged by her friend, American singer Gloria Estefan to record songs in English, as Estefan believed Shakira had potential to cross over into the anglophone pop market. Initially hesitant, Shakira decided to learn English well enough to write songs in the language. Shakira went on to write and produce the entirety of the record, under the guidance of Emilio Estefan, who executive produced the album. Writing predominantly about love, Shakira titled the album Laundry Service as she compared the fusion of love and music to that of water and soap. An eclectic pop rock record, the album draws on influences from Andean and Middle Eastern music while incorporating styles of dance-pop, rock and roll and tango.

Laundry Service received favourable to mixed reviews from music critics. Many critics complimented Shakira's varied musical styles and originality, while some critics argued that the album sounded too generic. Shakira's vocal talent also attracted praise. Laundry Service topped the charts of Australia, Austria, Belgium, Canada and Switzerland, while reaching the top five in Argentina, France, Germany, Spain and the United Kingdom. In the United States, Laundry Service peaked at number three on the Billboard 200 chart. The album received multiple record certifications, including sextuple platinum in Australia, quintuple in Canada, Spain and Switzerland. It was also certified multi-platinum in the United Kingdom and the United States, proving to be a successful crossover for Shakira. Globally, Laundry Service was the seventh best-selling album in 2002. The album sold around 13 million copies by 2011, making it one of the best-selling albums of the 21st century, and is considered the best-selling album by a female Latin artist. The album is listed at number 172 of the "Definitive 200" by the Rock and Roll Hall of Fame.

Six singles were released from the album. The lead single "Whenever, Wherever" became an international success, reaching number one on record charts of Australia, Austria, Canada, France, Germany, Italy and Spain. The second English-language single "Underneath Your Clothes" repeated that success, topping the charts of Australia, Austria, and Belgium. Both singles charted in the top ten in the United Kingdom and United States. Spanish-language singles "Te Dejo Madrid" and "Que Me Quedes Tú" performed well in Hispanic regions, becoming hits in Spain and on the Latin record charts in the United States, respectively. The fourth single "Objection (Tango)" became a top ten hit in most countries around the world, while the sixth and final single "The One" was a moderate commercial success. To promote the album, Shakira embarked on her Tour of the Mongoose between 2002 and 2003. It was her first major worldwide tour and visited many countries and cities.

== Background ==
In 1998, Shakira released her second major label studio album Dónde Están los Ladrones?, which became a commercial success in Latin America and Spain. The rock en español-influenced Latin pop album drew comparisons to the work of Canadian-American singer-songwriter Alanis Morissette and "cracked the lucrative US market wide open", spending a total of 11 weeks atop the Billboard Top Latin Albums chart. It became Shakira's first album to receive a platinum certification from the Recording Industry Association of America (RIAA). Dónde Están los Ladrones? spawned the Arabian-styled single "Ojos Así" ("Eyes Like Yours"), which became a hit and was deemed the "signature track" of the album.

Shakira's record label at that time, Epic Records, opposed the decision to release and commission Laundry Service as they "wanted her just to throw a couple of songs in English on a Latin music record." Gloria Estefan argued with Tommy Mottola, then head of Sony Music Entertainment (the parent company of Epic), and convinced him to release the album, arguing that an "American audience" would not buy a Spanish-language record simply due to its inclusion of a few English-language tracks. In an interview with Latina, she said "I got in the trenches there with Tommy [Mottola] - I fought for that. Because they didn't believe it. Just like they told us [her and Emilio during the Miami Sound Machine days]. They were trying to think in the box and I wanted to take her out of the box. And fortunately, Tommy, whom I love and adore and is a good friend, he really listened to me."

== Writing and recording ==
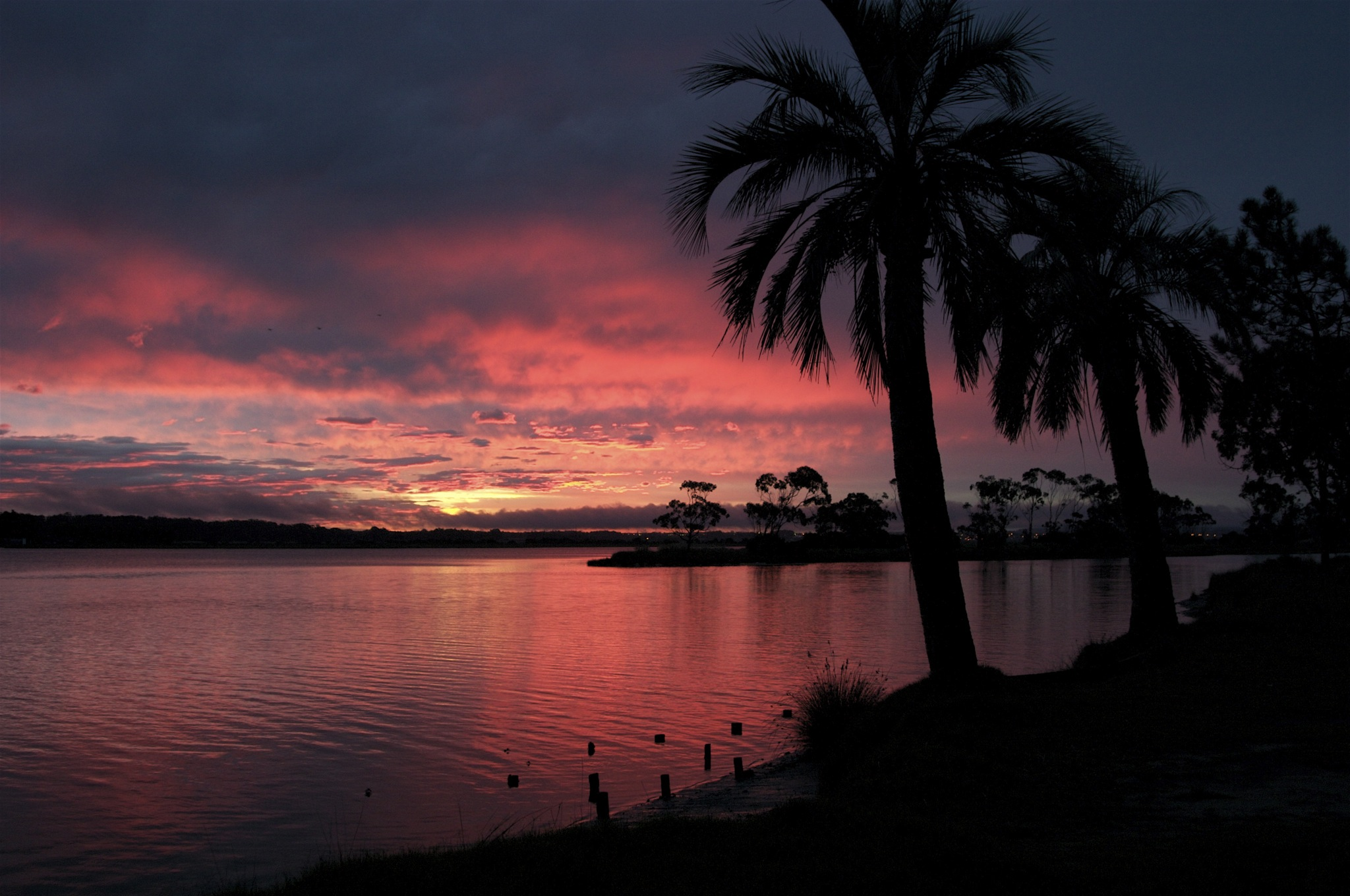
Shakira set up portable recording studios in the rural region of Uruguay.

The success of Dónde Están los Ladrones? prompted American singer Gloria Estefan in 1999, whose husband Emilio Estefan was managing Shakira at that time, to persuade Shakira to attempt to crossover into the mainstream pop industry. However, Shakira was initially hesitant to record songs in English as it was not her first language, so Gloria Estefan offered to translate "Ojos Así" into English in order to show her that "it could translate well." Shakira then began translating the song herself and showed it to Gloria, who responded "Quite honestly, I can't do this better!." As Shakira wanted to have full control over her recordings, she decided to learn English better to enable her to write her own songs. Wanting to find a method to express her "day-to-day stories in English", Shakira bought rhyming dictionaries, started analysing the lyrics of songs by Bob Dylan, reading poetry and the work of authors like Leonard Cohen and Walt Whitman and took English lessons from a private tutor.

Shakira continued writing under the guidance of Emilio Estefan, who executive produced Laundry Service. The first song she wrote was "Objection (Tango)" and, in an interview with Faze, she revealed that writing songs in English proved to be challenging for her: "I prayed and asked God to send me a good song today, and I remember I started writing the song ['Objection (Tango)'] a couple of hours after. I wrote the music and lyrics at the same time, and when that happens it's really magical to me." After completing "Objection (Tango)", Shakira decided to write ten more songs and began setting up portable recording studios in the rural region of Uruguay. She wrote various songs with a "dictionary in one hand and a thesaurus in the other." During the songwriting process, Shakira wrote "Underneath Your Clothes" as a love song for de la Rúa. She explained that, "If you check the subject of my songs, most of them talk about my own experiences and feelings and what I was actually going through in my life." Shakira collaborated with various writers and producers on the album including Gloria Estefan, Lester Mendez, Luis Fernando Ochoa and Tim Mitchell. Being "more in control than ever", Shakira closely supervised the development of the album. The singer also served as the primary producer of the album.

== Musical style ==
"Whenever, Wherever" (2001)
A 19 second sample of the chorus of lead single "Whenever, Wherever", in which Shakira experiments with Andean music.

"Underneath Your Clothes" (2002)
On the power ballad "Underneath Your Clothes", Shakira sings with "the range of an operatic diva". Her vocals on the album received praise from critics.

Although primarily a pop rock album, Laundry Service also draws influences from a variety of musical genres. The singer credited this to her mixed ethnicity, saying "I am a fusion. That's my persona. I'm a fusion between black and white, between pop and rock, between cultures - between my Lebanese father and my mother's Spanish blood, the Colombian folklore and Arab dance I love and American music." Arabian and Middle Eastern elements, which had a high influence on Dónde Están los Ladrones?, are also present in Laundry Service, most prominently on "Eyes Like Yours" (Ojos Así). Musical styles from different South American countries surface on the album. Tango, a style of fast-paced ballroom dance that originated in Argentina, is evident on "Objection (Tango)", which also combines elements of rock and roll. The uptempo track features a guitar solo and a bridge in which Shakira delivers rap-like vocals. "Whenever, Wherever" blends pop rock with Andean music and contains instrumentation from panpipes and the charango - traditional instruments generally associated with the genre.

A few songs are also influenced by dance-based genres; the "feisty" "Rules" is laced with new wave and "Ready for the Good Times" is inspired by disco music. The power ballad "Underneath Your Clothes" has Shakira delivering "racked" vocals and features brass instrumentation influenced by English rock band The Beatles. It contains a melody similar to the one in "Eternal Flame", a 1989 song by American all-female band The Bangles. Similarly, the tune of "The One", another power ballad on the album, is similar to that of "Michelle", a 1965 song by The Beatles. "Fool" and "Poem to a Horse" are more directly influenced by rock music. The former received comparisons to the work of Alanis Morissette while the latter also displays indie elements and contains instrumentation from a soul music-styled horn section and guitar riffs similar to the one present in songs by American grunge band Nirvana. Laundry Service also contains four Spanish tracks: "Que Me Quedes Tú" ("That You Remain With Me"), "Te Dejo Madrid" ("I Leave You Madrid"), "Suerte" ("Luck") and "Te Aviso, Te Anuncio (Tango)" ("I'm Warning You, I'm Announcing to You"); the latter two are Spanish translations of "Whenever, Wherever" and "Objection (Tango)", respectively.

== Lyrical themes ==
The lyrics of most songs in Laundry Service are based on issues and themes related to love, as they had been written after Shakira began a relationship Antonio de la Rúa, the son of former Argentine president Fernando de la Rúa. "Underneath Your Clothes" is an "ode" to the positivity one gains when pursuing a relationship with a good person. Shakira shows an "important side" in "The One", which is a song about how "you love your guy so much that you're actually going to learn to cook" and contains lines like "To buy more thongs and write more happy songs, it always takes a little help from someone." In "Rules", she aims to make her lover realise that he is "condemned" to her and lists "all the things your new boy can do." Songs like "Objection (Tango)" and "Fool" also deal with issues related to love but in a different manner. The former is dramatic and humorous in approach as Shakira commands her partner to end a love triangle and choose between her and the other lady; it was described as a "hell-hath-no-fury it's-her-or-me steam train." In the song, Shakira asserts that "Next to her cheap silicon I look minimal/That's why in front of your eyes I'm invisible", which a reviewer commented was a "brave statement in these days of suspiciously ripe teenybop flesh peddlers [sic]." "Fool" discusses how Shakira continues to try to build up a relationship with a "shitty, self-absorbed man" even after suffering a "soul-crushing defeat."

Shakira chose to entitle the album Laundry Service as she wanted to represent her passion for love and music, which she compared to soap and water, saying "The reason I named it "Laundry Service" is because I've spent the year dedicated to my two great passions: love and music. Those two elements are like soap and water. It was a deep cleansing, almost like being reborn." The title is tattooed on Shakira's arm on the album's cover artwork, alongside a star; the cover was designed by Shakira herself.

== Marketing and touring ==
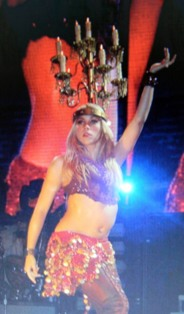
Shakira performing "Whenever, Wherever" during the Tour of the Mongoose

Laundry Service was first released in Hispanophone countries, under the title Servicio de Lavandería, on November 5, 2001. It was subsequently released in the United States on November 13. In most international markets, Laundry Service was released throughout early 2002. Subtitled Washed and Dried, the album was reissued worldwide in November 2002, including alternative versions of "Whenever, Wherever", "Underneath Your Clothes", and "Objection (Tango)", alongside a bonus DVD.

To promote Laundry Service, Shakira embarked on the Tour of the Mongoose (2002–2003). The tour was the singer's first worldwide tour and visited 50 cities and 30 countries, with its kick-off concert show held in San Diego, California. Various brands and franchises co-sponsored the tour, including international clothing brand Reebok and soft drink brand Pepsi. Seven buses and ten trailers were also employed to transport all the staff members. A stage covering 350 square meters was set up and preparations to arrange 280,000 watts of sound and light were made. A "solid nine-piece band" was hired to provide live instrumentation. Regarding the title of the tour, Shakira explained her decision to name it after the mongoose, saying:

"Its called the Tour of the Mongoose, and the mongoose is basically one of the few animals who can defeat the most venomous snakes with just one bite. And that's why I decided to name my tour that way, because I think that if we all have a little mongoose inside that can defeat the hatred and the resentment and the prejudice of everyday, we can probably win the battle."

Likewise, the theme of the tour was highly influenced by Shakira's political views, and this was prominently seen during the performance of "Octavo Día", a song from Dónde Están los Ladrones?, during which a film showing puppet caricatures of George W. Bush, then-President of the United States, and Saddam Hussein, then-President of Iraq, playing chess with their moves being controlled by the Grim Reaper. During the opening of the concert shows, a "massive" stage curtain showing a "mongoose and a cobra preparing for battle" split and a giant cobra slowly began rising from the centre of the stage to reveal Shakira, who wore "black leather pants and a black bikini top" and performed barefoot. Shakira incorporated belly dancing moves in her performances and often played various instruments throughout the shows herself, including the harmonica. Eight songs from Laundry Service were included on the setlist of the tour. A more afro-punk oriented version of "Objection (Tango)" was performed and featured instrumentation from bongos. As an intro to "Rules", Shakira played the harmonica, guitar, and drums. She also played an electric guitar during the performance of "Fool". "Whenever, Wherever" was included in the encore segment of the shows and was "made to feel even more celebratory by the massive amount of confetti shot on the crowd midway through." Shakira also performed covers of "Dude Looks Like a Lady", a song by American hard rock band Aerosmith, and "Back in Black", a song by Australian hard rock band AC/DC. Many performances made use of pyrotechnics and "six-foot flames that shot from the stage."

In 2004, a live album of the tour was released as Live & Off the Record. Aside from recording of the performances, the album included an hour-long documentary that shows Shakira "touring the world and doing such fun things as blowing bubbles, getting massages, and being serenaded by a mariachi band." A promotional CD single featuring the live performances of "Poem to a Horse" and "Whenever, Wherever" was also released to promote Live & Off the Record. The live album was certified platinum in France and gold in the United States.

=== Singles ===
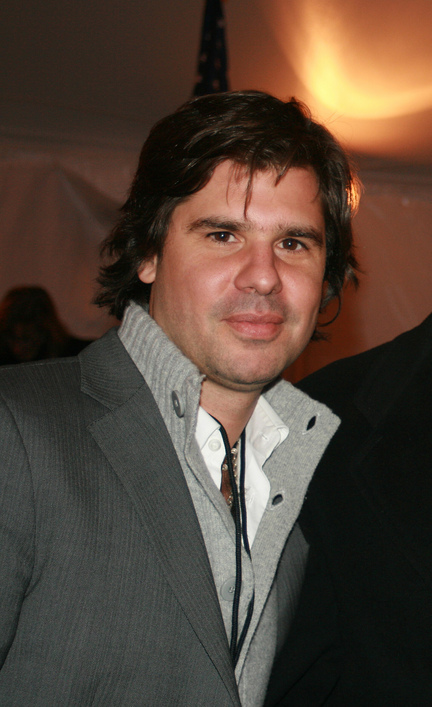
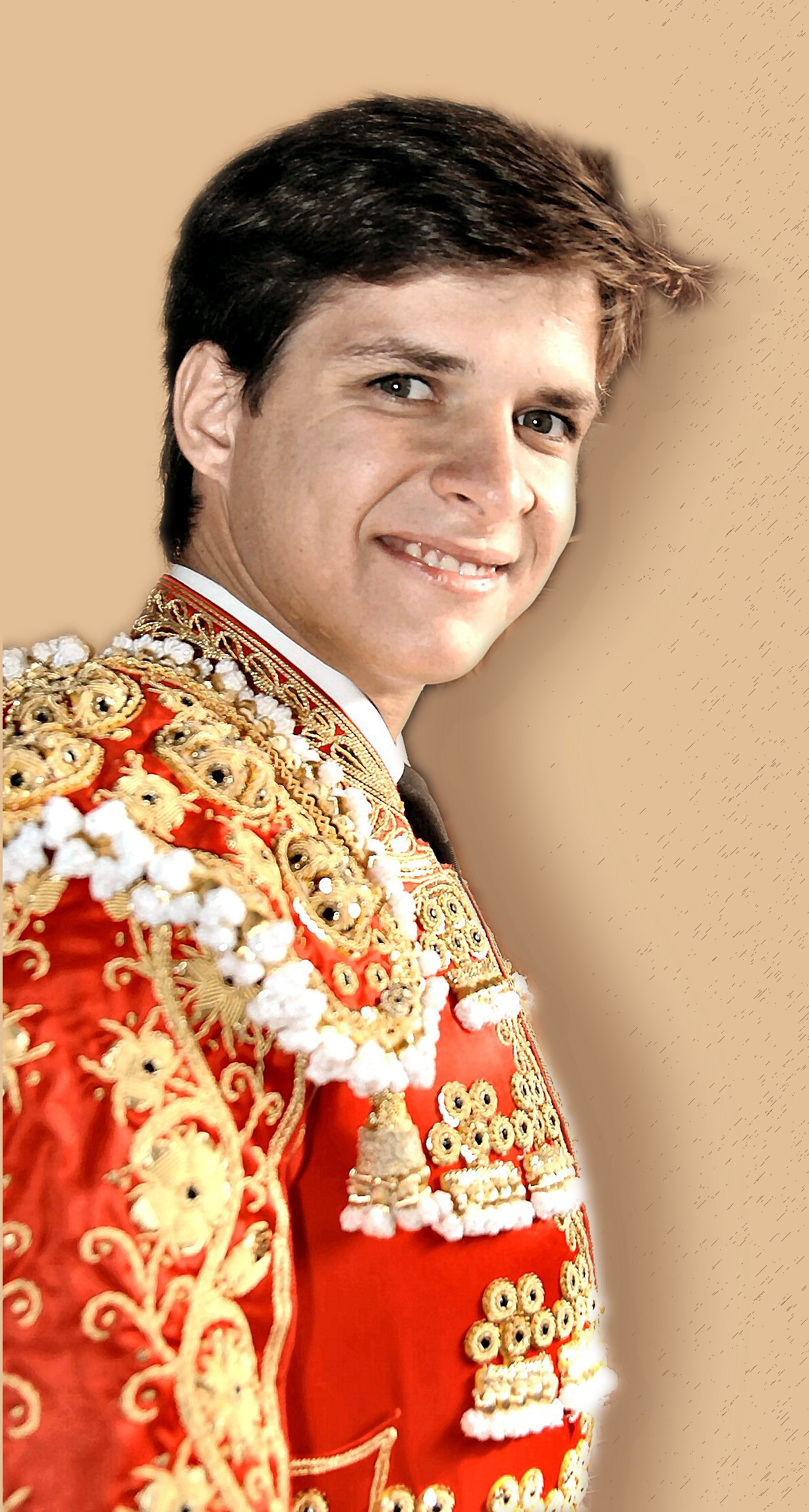
The music videos for "Underneath Your Clothes" and "Te Dejo Madrid" elicited controversy. The appearance of Antonio de la Rúa (left) in the former led to a ban of Shakira's album sales in Argentina, while the inclusion of a performance by the bullfighter Julián López Escobar (right) in the latter prompted him to file a lawsuit against Epic Records.

"Whenever, Wherever" was released as the lead single from Laundry Service on 30 August 2001. The song was commercially successful, peaking at number one in countries including Australia, Austria, France, Germany Italy, and more than 14 countries worldwide. In the United States, "Whenever, Wherever" became Shakira's first single to chart on the Billboard Hot 100 chart and peaked at number six. It stood as the singer's highest-peaking single on the chart until "Hips Don't Lie" reached number one in 2006. "Whenever, Wherever" narrowly missed peaking atop the chart in the United Kingdom by reaching number two. "Suerte", the Spanish-language version of the song, was also released and peaked at number one in Spain and on the US Billboard Hot Latin Songs chart. "Whenever, Wherever" attained numerous record certifications around the world, including multi-platinum certifications in Australia, Belgium, and Switzerland, platinum certifications in the United Kingdom, and a diamond certification in France. The accompanying music video of the song, which features Shakira belly dancing in various locations, was directed by Francis Lawrence and became popular on music video television channel MTV.

"Te Dejo Madrid" was released as the second single from the album in January 2002. It peaked at number seven in Spain but performed poorly on the Latin record charts in the United States, peaking at number 45 on the Billboard Hot Latin Songs chart. Spanish bullfighter Julián López Escobar, better known by his stage name El Juli, filed a lawsuit against Shakira for using scenes of one of his performances in the music video for "Te Dejo Madrid" without his permission.

"Underneath Your Clothes" was released as the third single from the album in February 2002. The song peaked atop the charts in Australia, Austria, and Belgium; it was certified platinum in the three countries. In other countries, it became a top five hit. "Underneath Your Clothes" entered the top ten of the US Billboard Hot 100 chart, peaking at number nine, while in the United Kingdom it reached number three. The accompanying music video for "Underneath Your Clothes" was directed by Herb Ritts and depicts Shakira's life on tour. Shakira's then boyfriend Antonio de la Rua makes an appearance in the video and this led to music retailer Tower Records Argentina banning sales of her albums in the country. The reason behind the ban was that Antonio de la Rua's father Fernando de la Rúa, who was the President of Argentina at that time, had resigned "in the midst of profound economic and political turmoil in the country," and the decision to ban sales of Shakira's albums was a "direct protest against Antonio De la Rua—not Shakira."

"Objection (Tango)" was released as the fourth single in May 2002. Although it was not a commercial success as big as "Whenever, Wherever" or "Underneath Your Clothes", the song performed well nonetheless. "Objection (Tango)" became a top ten hit in most countries and reached the top five in Australia and Netherlands. The song was certified platinum in Australia and gold in France. It became the last single from Laundry Service to chart on both the US Billboard Hot 100 and the UK Singles Chart, on which it peaked at numbers 55 and 17, respectively. Directed by Dave Meyers, the music video for "Objection (Tango)" features Shakira fighting her unfaithful lover and his mistress.

"Que Me Quedes Tú" was released as the fifth single in November 2002 and peaked at number 10 on the Spanish Singles Chart. It became a success on the Latin record charts in the United States, topping both the Billboard Hot Latin Songs and Latin Pop Airplay charts.

"The One" was released as the sixth and final single from the album in December 2002. It was a moderate chart success and reached the top 20 in most countries. "The One" became the only single from the album to not appear on any US Billboard chart. The music video for "The One" was directed by Esteban Sapir and Ramiro Agulla and shows Shakira singing the song while walking outside in the rain.

== Critical reception ==
=== Contemporary ===
Professional ratings
Review scores
Source	Rating
AllMusic	5/5 stars
Billboard	positive
Entertainment.ie	3/5 stars
Entertainment Weekly	C−
The Guardian	3/5 stars
Pitchfork	7.6/10
PopMatters	mixed
Robert Christgau	A−
Rolling Stone	2.5/5 stars
Yahoo! Music	6/10 stars

Laundry Service initially received mixed reviews, with critics expressing different opinions regarding the production and composition of the album. Alex Henderson from AllMusic commended Shakira's songwriting abilities in English, calling it a "challenge that she handles impressively well. Shakira, it turns out, sings quite convincingly in English," and also praised her different mixes of musical styles, saying "Like Shakira's Spanish-language albums, this self-produced CD is enjoyably eclectic; she successfully combines pop/rock with everything from tango on "Objection (Tango)" and Andean music on "Whenever, Wherever" to Middle Eastern music on "Eyes Like Yours". He concluded that "Dónde Están los Ladrones? remains Shakira's most essential album, but Laundry Service is an excellent English-language debut for the South American vocalist." A critic from Billboard also favoured the presence of various musical styles on the album and commented that "Laundry Service finds the 24-year-old artist unafraid of merging musical flavors," and complimented Shakira's vocal talent. Similarly, the Entertainment.ie review of the album deemed the lyrical content "surreal" and the production "no less bizarre [...] imposing breakneck tangos, twanging guitar solos and bizarre raps onto a familiar soft rock template." They felt that Laundry Service could not be called a "great album", reasoning that "the line between fascinatingly strange and offputtingly weird is a thin one, and Laundry Service crosses it far too often," but also stated that "Even so, Shakira's star quality can hardly be denied - and in today's increasingly conformist pop industry that deserves at least two cheers."

Alexis Petridis from The Guardian lauded Shakira's originality, opining that "In an age of personality-free pop idols, Shakira's glorious eccentricity makes her a true star," and commented that "Every song contains at least one non sequitur so eccentric that it could be the work of 1970s rock surrealist Captain Beefheart" and "The music on Laundry Service gives the lyrics a run for their money in the oddball handicap." Although he felt that the use of samples on various songs "displays an attitude to plagiarism that Noel Gallagher would consider cavalier" and that "no one could claim Laundry Service was a groundbreaking work of art," he concluded that "its ramshackle production and imponderable lyrics are striking and unique. And these days, it's hard not to find any pop record that provokes those adjectives rather cheering." Music critic Robert Christgau termed Laundry Service "the Cher album Cher never made" and attributed this to Shakira's blend of Middle Eastern styles in her music; he commented that the "stylistic appetite of this Colombian superstar is pure rock en Español" and appreciated Shakira's confident songwriting. Christgau also noted Shakira's strong vibrato and constant changing of timbre in her vocals. Lisa Oliver from Yahoo! Music said that Shakira's experimentation with different styles yield "results ranging from corking to minging," but experienced difficulty with the formatting of the CD, saying "the biggest problem with 'Laundry Service' is the anti-copying device that renders the CD useless in anything other than a conventional CD player [...] A shame then, because this Latino hottie could dilate the musical pupils of even the most ardent homebody if only they could get off the computer long enough to hear it."

At the same time Shakira's album evoked sharp criticism by a number of authors. David Browne from Entertainment Weekly, for instance, called the album a "the ultimate in crossover nightmares" and opined that Shakira's incorporation of different musical genres made it sound confusing, saying "Its wan ska-pop, faux-country ballads, and generic rock barely betray a Spanish accent or any musical heritage. (She can't decide if she wants to sound like Alanis or Shania)". Matt Cibula from PopMatters gave a more mixed view in his review of Laundry Service; he complimented some of the lyrics of the songs but expressed disappointment in Shakira's production of the album, writing it off as "generic". He felt that the album was "extremely safe" and speculated that the reason behind the album's "generic" sound was due to the Estefans' involvement, saying "when I read that she's [Gloria Estefan] helping you with lyrics and he's [Emilio Estefan] 'executive producer', and I hear the unmistakable hum of 'moneymoneymoneymoney' in the background [sic]." Ernesto Lechner from Rolling Stone complimented the singer's voice as a "wild and beautiful instrument [...] capable of delivering scorching moments of musical passion," but commented that the involvement of a "battalion of producers and songwriters" led to Shakira sounding "downright silly" on Laundry Service and also criticised "her efforts to spice things up with obvious touches of Latin American folklore."

Some authors criticised Shakira's first English album for the clumsy rhyme of its songs. Elizabeth Mendez Berry's article in "Vibe" is particularly indicative in this sense. In reference to Shakira's texts in English, the journalist wrote: "While her Spanish-language albums sparkled with elegant wordplay, this record is rife with cliches, both musically and lyrically. [...] For Anglophone Latin lovers, Shakira's lyrics are best left to the imagination."

=== Retrospective ===
In a 2020 review, Isabelia Herrera of Pitchfork called the album a "formidable compendium of Shakira's sonic and corporeal world", stating that it "revealed her fascinating, idiosyncratic songwriting" and that it "laid the groundwork for Shakira's legacy as a pop chameleon". In 2025, Rolling Stone ranked the album at number 176 on its list of "The 250 Greatest Albums of the 21st Century So Far". It has also been noted for its distinct place in her discography, being "a far cry from her modern-day reggaeton-stylings and instead shows off how her remarkable voice can adjust to the wide-range of genres which feature."

=== Accolades ===
Laundry Service garnered Shakira a number of awards. At the 2002 American Latino Media Arts Awards (ALMA Awards) ceremony, the album won the award for "Album of the Year" and Shakira won the award for "Outstanding Female Performer". At the inaugural MTV Video Music Awards Latin America (VMALA) ceremony in 2002, Shakira won a total of five awards, which included "Artist of the Year", "Video of the Year" (for "Suerte"), "Female Artist of the Year", "Pop Artist of the Year" and "Best Artist - North Latin America". At the inaugural Premios Oye! in the same year, the album received a nomination in the category of "Record of the Year", while Shakira won the awards for "International Female Artist of the Year" and "Latin Pop Female Artist of the Year". At the 2002 Premio Lo Nuestro ceremony, Shakira won the "Premio del Pueblo" ("People's Choice Award") in the category of "Pop/Rock" for Laundry Service. At the 2003 NRJ Music Awards, Laundry Service was announced as the winner of "Best International Album" and Shakira was named the "Best International Female Artist". The album was also nominated for "International Album of the Year" at the 2003 Juno Awards.

== Commercial performance ==
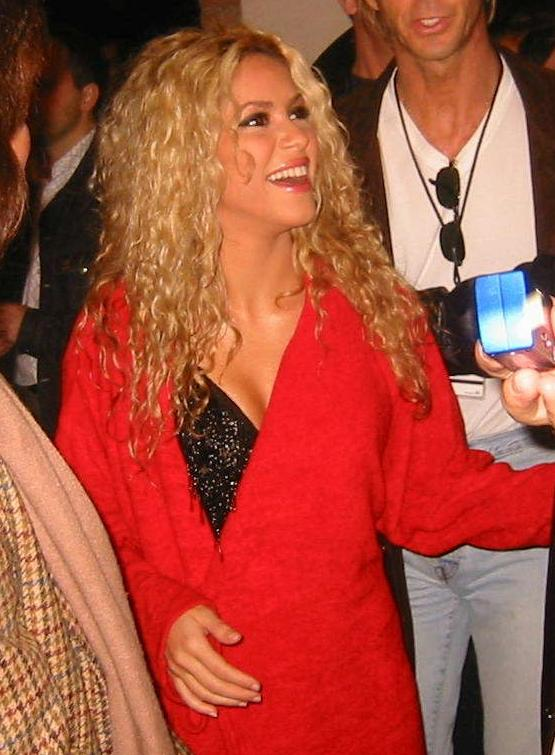
Shakira during the Tour of the Mongoose

In Austria, Laundry Service entered the Ö3 Austria Top 40 albums chart at number five and peaked at number one, spending a total of 71 weeks on the chart. The album was certified double-platinum by the IFPI Austria for selling 80,000 units. In the Dutch-speaking Flanders region of Belgium, it reached number one on the Ultratop chart, while it peaked at number five in the French-speaking Wallonia region of the country. After debuting at number 40 on the Finnish Albums Chart, Laundry Service quickly ascended to number one and charted for a total of 49 weeks. By 2007, the album had gone triple-platinum in the country and had sold a total of 90,140 units. In France, Laundry Service debuted at number nine on the Syndicat National de l'Édition Phonographique (SNEP) albums chart and peaked at number five for three weeks; its stay on the chart lasted for 89 weeks. It was certified double-platinum by the SNEP for sales of 600,000 units. It remained as Shakira's greatest certified album in the country until her ninth studio album Sale el Sol was certified diamond in 2011. In Germany, it peaked at number two on the Media Control chart and charted for 31 weeks. Bundesverband Musikindustrie (BVMI) certified Laundry Service quintuple-gold in Germany for shipments of 750,000 units. In Hungary, it peaked at number four on the MAHASZ chart and was her highest-charting album in the country until Sale el Sol reached the same position in 2010. The album was certified platinum in Hungary.

After debuting at number three on the Italian Albums Chart, Laundry Service ascended to number two the following week but was kept from attaining the top position by Alanis Morissette's 2002 album Under Rug Swept. In Spain, Servicio de Lavanderia reached number two on the PROMUSICAE albums chart. It also charted in 2005 in the country along with Shakira's fifth and sixth studio albums Fijación Oral, Vol. 1 and Oral Fixation, Vol. 2, respectively. The album has been certified quintuple-platinum by PROMUSICAE for shipments of 500,000 units. In Sweden, Laundry Service debuted atop the Sverigetopplistan chart and stayed on the top position for three weeks. It was certified double platinum by IFPI Sweden in 2003. In Switzerland, the album entered the Schweizer Hitparade chart at number 81 and peaked at number one, spending a total of 84 weeks on the chart. Laundry Service was later certified quintuple-platinum by the IFPI for selling 200,000 units in Switzerland. In the United Kingdom, Laundry Service debuted at number three on the UK Albums Chart. It later peaked at number two. The album was certified double-platinum by the British Phonographic Industry (BPI) for shipments of 600,000 copies. By 2002, Laundry Service had sold more than four million copies in Europe alone and thus was certified quadruple-platinum by IFPI Europe.

In the Asian continent the album managed to enter chats in countries like Singapore at the highest position being 6 where it was later certified as "gold record" until 2002, in Japan the album entered the Oricon list at the highest position being 21 spending a total of 10 weeks on the chart achieving until 2006 sales of 101,720 sales in Japan according to the Oricon Book Charts, the album was certified in countries like India with more than 200 thousand sales achieving 5 platinum records, Russia with more than 100,000 units, Indonesia certified gold, Thailand reaching platinum record, in Turkey become one of the best selling album of all time and she has received a platinum disc by Sony Music Turkey in a press conference in Istanbul in 2002, By 2003 the album had already gone triple platinum, Taiwan certified platinum record, in countries like South Korea "Laundry Service" entered the weekly chart at number 15 selling a quantity of 9,863 copies.

In Africa, Laundry Service entered the South African charts, reaching number 2 and subsequently being certified platinum for 50,000 copies by 2002. In Egypt, the album was certified 4× platinum in 2002. In Zimbabwe, Shakira reached number 1 on the weekly chart of best-selling international albums in 2002.

In Latin America the album had excellent commercial performance entering charts in countries such as Argentina in the number 3 position reaching double platinum for sales of 80,000 thousand units, in countries such as Uruguay it entered the international artists chart reaching the number 3 position and being certified gold later, in Ecuador it was certified double platinum by 2002, in Colombia until 2002 it had been certified double platinum according to Sony Music Colombia until 2017 the album had already reached 6 platinum records, in Mexico the album until 2002 was certified double platinum for sales of 300,000 thousand units, until 2021 the album has more than 494,000 physical sales there. In Brazil the album was certified platinum until 2021 for sales of 125,000 copies, in Venezuela Shakira reached five platinum records by the end of 2002, by 2011 the album already had a total of 149,733 thousand units in the country, in Chile until 2003 "Laundry Service" managed to achieve sales of more than 40,000 thousand copies. In Peru the album reached Gold status at the end of 2002. In Central America, Shakira achieved double platinum status.

In Australia, Laundry Service became Shakira's first album to chart on the ARIA Albums Chart after debuting at number two. It later peaked at number one for two weeks and in total it spent 54 weeks on the charts. Consequently, it became the second best-selling album of the year 2002 in the country, behind only American rapper Eminem's album The Eminem Show. The Australian Recording Industry Association (ARIA) certified Laundry Service quintuple-platinum for shipments of 350,000 units, making it Shakira's most successful album in the country and one of the best selling albums of all time in Australia, entering the all time chart at position of 29. The album also performed well in New Zealand, peaking at number four on the national albums chart and appearing on the chart for 47 weeks. By 2003, Laundry Service had been certified triple-platinum by the Recording Industry Association of New Zealand (RIANZ) for shipping 45,000 units.

In Canada, the album peaked atop the Billboard Canadian Albums Chart and is Shakira's only album to reach number one in the country. Eventually, Laundry Service was certified quintuple-platinum by Music Canada for shipments of 500,000 albums. In the United States, Laundry Service debuted and peaked at number three on the Billboard 200 chart, selling 200,000 copies in its first week. It stayed on the chart for a total of 61 weeks. The album also debuted and peaked at number six on the Billboard Top Internet Albums chart. It has sold over 1 million copies less than a month after its release. After around six months since its release, Laundry Service had been certified triple-platinum by the RIAA for shipments of 3,000,000 units in the United States. It is Shakira's best-selling album in the country, with sales of 4,000,000 units as of 2022. According to RIAA the album has been certified 4× Platinum in the United States. The album in its first year of release managed to sell 10 million copies worldwide making Shakira an award given by Sony Music for the highest recorded sales. According to the IFPI, Laundry Service was the seventh best-selling album in the world in 2002 with platinum certifications in 32 countries and gold certification in 10 countries. The album was named as one of the 100 biggest albums of the century by female artists in the United Kingdom by Official Charts, ranking at number 81.

== Legacy ==
"I plan to keep on being the same artist, with the same musical language, just in a different spoken language. It's all still coming from my real feelings, my real-life experiences."

— Shakira, following her successful crossover into the English-language pop market.

The album's commercial success led to Shakira being deemed one of the most successful Latin crossover artists of all time, with Steve Huey from AllMusic calling her "Latin pop's biggest female crossover artist since Jennifer Lopez" and "an instant pop sensation, thanks to her quirky poetic sense and a sexy video image built on her hip-shaking belly dance moves." The success of the album also received considerable backlash, with many calling Shakira a "sellout". This negative response was further heightened by the fact that Shakira, a natural brunette, had bleached her hair blonde prior to the album's release, which many viewed as a tactic to "fit into the US market." Regarding this backlash, Shakira said, "I know my Latin people find this difficult. And I want [my success] to be good news to my country. But it's typical that when you see somebody who is so close to you growing, you feel that the very word 'growing' is synonymous with leaving. My hair is a coincidence. I dyed it more than two and a half years ago." On the other hand, many viewed Shakira's crossover success as a "strong cultural statement" as her musical style represented her mixed ethnicity.

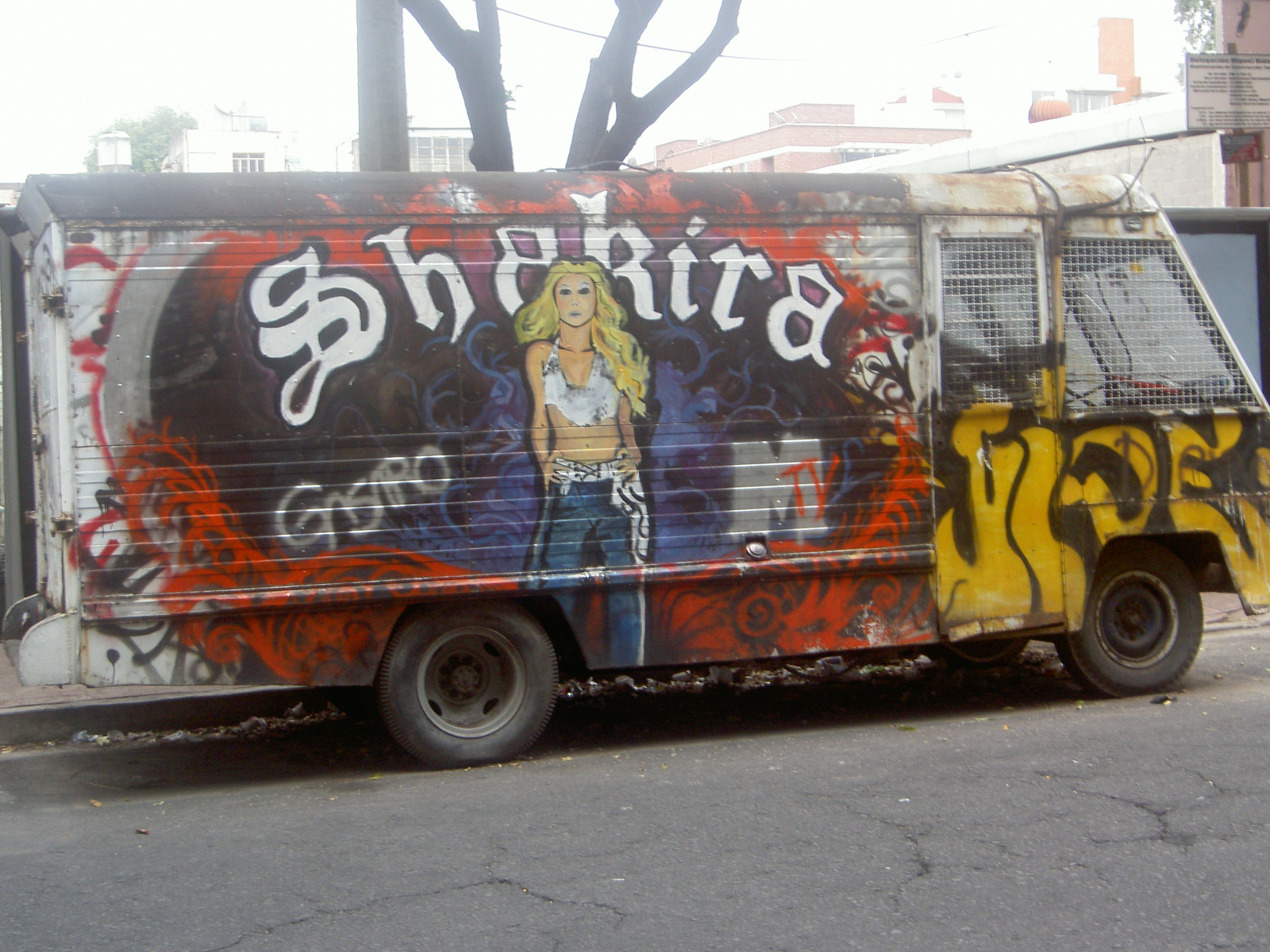
A painting of Shakira on a van in Portugal, similar to the image of the singer in one of the promotional shoots of the album.

In 2002, the singer was interviewed by Nobel Prize in Literature-winning Colombian novelist and journalist Gabriel García Márquez, who was "astonished by her fantastical work-rate" and said that "Shakira's music has a personal stamp that doesn't look like anyone else's and no one can sing or dance like her, at whatever age, with such an innocent sensuality, one that seems to be of her own invention." In the United States and the United Kingdom, Shakira drew comparisons to American pop singer Britney Spears as they looked similar and sported "bleached blonde curls and butter-wouldn't-melt smiles for the kids down the front." However, critics argued that Shakira's vocal style was very different from Spears', with Ted Kessler from The Observer calling the former an "operatic diva" and writing that "as soon as she opens her mouth, she slips into gear and motors powerfully past Britney's breathy bump'n'grind." In 2009, Julia Llewellyn Smith from The Daily Telegraph commented that "Shakira makes comparable Spanish-English 'crossover' acts such as Jennifer Lopez and Enrique Iglesias seem like minnows." In an interview with Latina magazine in 2011, Gloria Estefan was asked whether she felt another crossover artist like Shakira could emerge in her lifetime, to which she responded, "I'm always hopeful that somebody, any Latino, is going to succeed in what they do. And of course in music, undoubtedly." Shakira's crossover success has been such that the media point out that possibly without its crossover many Latin artists such as Karol G, Becky G, Bad Bunny, Maluma or J Balvin would possibly not have the recognition that they enjoy today, and it is seen as a great step in the Latin industry since with the voice of Shakira the music industry would stop only focusing on American artists and Latinas would enter the arena such as Paulina Rubio, Thalía and even Fey who also ventured to conquer other audiences. Noting that thanks to Shakira, Latino artists now have a greater space in an international music industry in which prejudice and even racism continue to exist.

Shakira's belly-dancing ability came into attention and gathered coverage during this period, especially due to the music video of the lead single "Whenever, Wherever". The song also became famous for one of its lines in which Shakira sings "Lucky that my breasts are small and humble, so you don't confuse them with mountains"; it is often cited as an example of the unusual lyrical content of the singer's songs. According to Steve Huey from AllMusic, many critics were "divided as to the effectiveness of Shakira's English lyrics, but nearly all agreed on her unique poetic imagery." Huey further commented that the song and its video turned Shakira into a "star in the English-speaking world almost overnight." "Whenever, Wherever", along with "Underneath Your Clothes", is considered to be one of Shakira's signature songs.

== Track listing ==
All lyrics are written by Shakira, except where noted.

Laundry Service
No.	Title	Lyrics	Music	Producer(s)	Length
1.	"Objection (Tango)"		Shakira	Shakira; Lester Mendez^{[a]}	3:45
2.	"Underneath Your Clothes"		Shakira; Mendez	Shakira; Mendez^{[a]}	3:46
3.	"Whenever, Wherever"	Shakira; Gloria Estefan	Shakira; Tim Mitchell	Shakira; Mitchell^{[a]}	3:17
4.	"Rules"		Shakira; Mendez	Shakira; Mendez^{[a]}	3:41
5.	"The One"		Shakira; Glen Ballard	Shakira; Mendez^{[a]}	3:44
6.	"Ready for the Good Times"		Shakira; Mendez	Shakira; Mendez^{[a]}	4:15
7.	"Fool"	Shakira; Brendan Buckley	Shakira; Buckley	Shakira; Buckley^{[a]}; Mendez^{[a]}	3:52
8.	"Te Dejo Madrid"		Shakira; Mitchell; George Noriega	Shakira; Mendez^{[a]}; Mitchell^{[a]}; Noriega^{[a]}	3:08
9.	"Poem to a Horse"		Shakira; Luis Fernando Ochoa	Shakira; Ochoa^{[a]}	4:10
10.	"Que Me Quedes Tú"		Shakira; Ochoa	Shakira; Ochoa^{[a]}	4:49
11.	"Eyes Like Yours (Ojos Así)"	Shakira; Estefan	Shakira; Javier Garza; Pablo Flores	Shakira; Garza; Flores	3:59
12.	"Suerte (Whenever, Wherever)"		Shakira; Mitchell	Shakira; Mitchell^{[a]}	3:13
13.	"Te Aviso, Te Anuncio (Tango)"		Shakira	Shakira; Mendez^{[a]}	3:44
Total length:					49:15

Laundry Service: Washed and Dried
No.	Title	Producer(s)	Length
14.	"Whenever, Wherever" (Sahara mix)	Shakira; Mitchell^{[a]}; Tamer Zeitoun^{[b]}; Hani Kamal^{[b]}	3:59
15.	"Underneath Your Clothes" (Acoustic version)	Mitchell	3:58
16.	"Objection (Tango)" (Afro-Punk version)	Mitchell	3:55

=== Notes ===
- ^{^[a]} signifies a co-producer
- ^{^[b]} signifies an additional producer
- On Servicio de Lavandería pressings, tracks 1 and 3 switch positions with tracks 12 and 13.
- Japanese pressings include "Ojos Así", the original version of track 11.
- Original Washed and Dried limited edition pressings include a bonus DVD containing the 2002 MTV Video Music Awards performance, the music video, and MTV's behind-the-scenes footage for track 1.
- The 2021 Washed and Dried expanded edition includes the Pepsi Super Bowl LIV Halftime Show remix of track 3.

== Personnel ==
Credits are adapted from the liner notes of Laundry Service.

- Shakira – producer, songwriter, arranger, vocals, harmonica, logo design
- Emilio Estefan Jr. – executive producer, percussion
- Rita Quintero – background vocals
- Terry Manning – engineer
- Javier Garza – producer, engineer, mixer, arranger
- Tim Mitchell – producer, arranger, guitar, mandolin, programmer
- Lester Mendez – producer, arranger, horn arranger, keyboards
- Pablo Flores – producer, arranger, programmer
- Ted Jensen – mastering
- Luis Fernando Ochoa – arranger, guitar, keyboards
- Jorge Calandrelli – arranger, piano arranger
- David Campbell – conductor, string arranger
- Alfred Figueroa – engineer
- Kevin Dillon – production coordinator
- Steven Menezes – studio coordinator
- Adam Zimmon – guitar
- Tim Pierce – guitar
- Brian Ray – guitar
- Paul Bushnell – bass guitar
- Julio Hernandez – bass guitar
- Pablo Aslan – acoustic bass
- Brendan Buckley – drums, percussion
- Abe Laboriel, Jr. – drums
- Edwin Bonilla – percussion
- Richard Bravo – percussion
- Archie Pena – percussion
- David Alsina – bandoneon

== Charts ==
=== Weekly charts ===
2001–2003 weekly chart performance (Note: Credited to Servicio de Lavandería in Hispanophone countries)
Chart	Peak position
Australian Albums (ARIA)	1
Austrian Albums (Ö3 Austria)	1
Belgian Albums (Ultratop Flanders)	1
Belgian Albums (Ultratop Wallonia)	5
Canadian Albums (Billboard)	1
Czech Albums (ČNS IFPI)	12
Danish Albums (Hitlisten)	3
Dutch Albums (Album Top 100)	1
European Top 100 Albums (Music & Media)	1
French Albums (SNEP)	5
Finnish Albums (Suomen virallinen lista)	1
Finnish Albums (Suomen virallinen lista) Washed and Dried	25
German Albums (Offizielle Top 100)	2
Greek International Albums (IFPI)	1
Hungarian Albums (MAHASZ)	4
Icelandic Albums (Tónlistinn)	2
Irish Albums (IRMA)	2
Italian Albums (FIMI)	2
Japanese Albums (Oricon)	21
New Zealand Albums (RMNZ)	4
Norwegian Albums (VG-lista)	1
Polish Albums (ZPAV)	2
Portuguese Albums (AFP)	1
Scottish Albums (Official Charts)	1
Singaporean International Albums (RIAS)	6
South African Albums (RISA)	2
Spanish Albums (AFYVE)	1
Slovak Albums (IFPI)	2
Swedish Albums (Sverigetopplistan)	1
Swiss Albums (Schweizer Hitparade)	1
UK Albums (Official Charts)	2
US Billboard 200	3
US Billboard 200 Washed and Dried	112

=== Monthly charts ===
2001–2002 monthly chart performance
Chart	Peak position
Argentine Albums (CAPIF)	3
South Korean International Albums (RIAK)	15
Uruguayan Albums (CUD)	2

=== Year-end charts ===
2001 year-end chart performance
Chart	Position
Argentine Albums (CAPIF)	8
Canadian Albums (Nielsen SoundScan)	167
Spanish Albums (AFYVE)	27
Worldwide Albums (IFPI)	31

2002 year-end chart performance
Chart	Position
Australian Albums (ARIA)	2
Austrian Albums (Ö3 Austria)	3
Belgian Albums (Ultratop Flanders)	7
Belgian Albums (Ultratop Wallonia)	12
Canadian Albums (Nielsen SoundScan)	6
Dutch Albums (Album Top 100)	2
European Top 100 Albums (Music & Media)	1
Finnish Albums (Suomen virallinen lista)	1
French Albums (SNEP)	16
German Albums (Offizielle Top 100)	2
Irish Albums (IRMA)	6
Italian Albums (FIMI)	10
New Zealand Albums (RMNZ)	2
Spanish Albums (AFYVE)	14
Spanish International Albums (AFYVE)	2
Swedish Albums (Sverigetopplistan)	5
Swiss Albums (Schweizer Hitparade)	1
UK Albums (OCC)	21
US Billboard 200	11
Worldwide Albums (IFPI)	7

2003 year-end chart performance
Chart	Position
Australian Albums (ARIA)	50
Austrian Albums (Ö3 Austria)	47
Belgian Albums (Ultratop Flanders)	60
Belgian Albums (Ultratop Wallonia)	41
Dutch Albums (Album Top 100)	32
French Albums (SNEP)	30
German Albums (Offizielle Top 100)	47
Hungarian Albums (MAHASZ)	73
Swiss Albums (Schweizer Hitparade)	59

=== Decade-end charts ===
2000s decade-end chart performance
Chart	Position
Australian Albums (ARIA)	43
Austrian Albums (Ö3 Austria)	20
Dutch Albums (Album Top 100)	21
US Billboard 200	114

=== Centurial charts ===
21st century chart performance
Chart	Position
UK Female Albums (OCC)	81

=== All-time charts ===
All-time chart performance
Chart	Position
Irish Female Albums (IRMA)	35

== Certifications ==
Certifications and sales
Region	Certification	Certified units/sales
Argentina (CAPIF)	2× Platinum	80,000^{^}
Australia (ARIA)	6× Platinum	500,000
Austria (IFPI Austria)	2× Platinum	80,000^{*}
Belgium (BRMA)	Platinum	50,000^{*}
Brazil (Pro-Música Brasil)	Platinum	125,000^{‡}
Canada (Music Canada)	5× Platinum	500,000^{^}
Canada (Music Canada) Washed and Dried	Gold	50,000^{‡}
Chile (IFPI Chile)	8× Platinum	40,000
Colombia (ASINCOL)	2× Diamond	
Colombia (ASINCOL) Streaming	Gold	
Czech Republic (ČNS IFPI)	Gold	
Denmark (IFPI Danmark)	Platinum	50,000^{^}
Ecuador (IFPI)	2× Platinum	
Egypt	4× Platinum	
Finland (Musiikkituottajat)	3× Platinum	90,140
France (SNEP)	2× Platinum	600,000^{*}
Germany (BVMI)	5× Gold	750,000^{^}
Greece (IFPI Greece)	Platinum	30,000^{^}
Hong Kong	Gold	
Hungary (MAHASZ)	Platinum	
India (IMI)	5× Platinum	
Indonesia (ASIRI)	Gold	
Ireland (IRMA)	Platinum	
Italy (FIMI)	2× Platinum	200,000
Japan	—	100,000
Mexico (AMPROFON)	Diamond+Gold	575,000^{‡}
Netherlands (NVPI)	2× Platinum	160,000^{^}
New Zealand (RMNZ)	3× Platinum	45,000^{^}
Norway (IFPI Norway)	Platinum	110,000
Peru (UNIMPRO)	Gold	
Poland (ZPAV)	Platinum	70,000^{*}
Portugal (AFP)	4× Platinum	160,000^{^}
Romania (UPFR)	Platinum	
Russia (NFPF)	5× Platinum	100,000
Singapore (RIAS)	Gold	
South Africa (RISA)	Platinum	50,000
South Korea	—	9,863
Spain (Promusicae)	5× Platinum	500,000^{^}
Sweden (GLF)	2× Platinum	160,000^{^}
Switzerland (IFPI Switzerland)	5× Platinum	200,000^{^}
Taiwan (RIT)	Platinum	50,000
Thailand (TECA)	Platinum	
Turkey (Mü-Yap)	3× Platinum	
United Kingdom (BPI)	3× Platinum	900,000^{‡}
United States (RIAA)	4× Platinum	4,000,000^{‡}
Uruguay (CUD)	Gold	
Venezuela (APFV)	2× Platinum	149,733
Summaries
Central America (CFC)	2× Platinum	
Europe (IFPI)	4× Platinum	4,000,000^{*}
Worldwide	—	13,000,000
^{*} Sales figures based on certification alone.^{^} Shipments figures based on certification alone.^{‡} Sales+streaming figures based on certification alone.

== Release history ==
Release dates and formats
Region	Date	Edition(s)	Format(s)	Label(s)	Ref.
Argentina	5 November 2001	Servicio de Lavandería	CD	Columbia; Sony	
Mexico	6 November 2001	Servicio de Lavandería	CD	Columbia; Sony	
Spain	12 November 2001	Servicio de Lavandería	CD	Columbia; Sony	
United States	13 November 2001	Standard	Cassette; CD	Epic	
South Korea	16 November 2001	Standard	Cassette; CD	Sony	
Germany	28 January 2002	Standard	CD	Sony	
Australia	15 February 2002	Standard	CD	Sony	
France	7 March 2002	Standard	CD	Epic	
United Kingdom	11 March 2002	Standard	CD	Epic	
Japan	20 March 2002	Standard	CD	Sony Japan	
United Kingdom	11 November 2002	Washed and Dried	CD+DVD	Epic	
United States	12 November 2002	Washed and Dried	CD+DVD	Epic	
Australia	18 November 2002	Washed and Dried	CD+DVD	Sony	
France	9 January 2003	Washed and Dried	CD+DVD	Epic	
Various	12 November 2021	Washed and Dried	Digital download; streaming	Sony	
United States	17 December 2021	Standard	Vinyl	Legacy	
Europe	21 January 2022	Standard	Vinyl	Sony	
Australia	28 January 2022	Standard	Vinyl	Sony	

== See also ==
- List of best-selling albums by women
- List of best-selling albums of the 21st century
- List of best-selling albums of the 2000s in Australia
- List of best-selling albums in France
- List of 200 Definitive Albums in the Rock and Roll Hall of Fame
