= Live & off the Record =

Live album by Shakira
- Released: 30 March 2004
- Recorded: 2002–2003
- Venues: Ahoy, Rotterdam, Netherlands
- Genres: Latin pop; rock en español
- Length: 90:33
- Label: Epic
- Producers: Shakira; Tim Mitchell

Shakira chronology
Grandes Éxitos (2002)	Live & off the Record (2004)	Fijación Oral, Vol. 1 (2005)

Shakira video chronology
Grandes Éxitos (2002)	Live & off the Record (2004)	Oral Fixation, Vol. 1 & 2 (2006)

Professional ratings
Review scores
Source	Rating
AllMusic	3/5 stars

Live & off the Record (titled En Vivo y en Privado in Spain and Latin America) is the second live album by Colombian singer-songwriter Shakira. The album was released in 2004, consisting of a two-disc CD and DVD compilation. The CD includes recordings of live performances recorded during 2003 and 2004, and the DVD includes footage from Shakira's Tour of the Mongoose live performance in Rotterdam, Netherlands on 22 April 2003. The album was certified gold by the RIAA in May 2004. It was number one on the US Top Music Videos chart on 17 April 2004.

== Background and release ==
In 2002, Shakira embarked on Tour of the Mongoose to promote her fifth studio album Laundry Service (2001). The tour date in Rotterdam on 22 April 2003 was recorded, and it was released on 30 March 2004 under the title Live & off the Record. Featured on the DVD are 15 out of the 19 tracks recorded with only 10 on the CD; out of the other four tracks recorded "Fool" and "Dónde Están los Ladrones?" are featured on the Target edition of Shakira's sixth studio album Fijación Oral, Vol. 1 (2005), while the recordings of "Dude (Looks Like a Lady)" and "Un Poco de Amor" remain unreleased. The DVD also features behind-the-scenes recordings from the tour.

"Poem to a Horse (Live)" and "Whenever, Wherever (Live)" were released as promotional singles off the live album.

== Reception ==
Elena Basanta from Cadena 100 hailed the live album as "one of Shakira's most versatile albums", pointing out her versatility performing a wide variety of musical genres, as well as praising her vocals and energy.

== Track listing ==
=== CD ===
No.	Title	Writer(s)	Length
1.	"Ojos Así"	Javier Garza; Pablo Flores; Shakira	8:14
2.	"Si Te Vas"	Luis Fernando Ochoa, Shakira	4:36
3.	"Underneath Your Clothes"	Lester Mendez; Shakira	4:13
4.	"Ciega, Sordomuda"	Estefano Salgado; Shakira	4:58
5.	"The One"	Glen Ballard; Shakira	3:46
6.	"Back in Black" (AC/DC cover)	Angus Young; Malcolm Young; Brian Johnson	5:23
7.	"Tú"	Dillon O'Biren; Shakira	4:50
8.	"Poem to a Horse" (Contains the Band Introductions)	Ochoa; Shakira	7:13
9.	"Objection (Tango)"	Shakira	4:22
10.	"Whenever, Wherever"	Gloria Estefan; Tim Mitchell; Shakira	7:52

=== DVD ===
No.	Title	Writer(s)	Length
1.	"Ojos Así"	Javier Garza; Pablo Flores; Shakira	9:04
2.	"Si Te Vas"	Luis Fernando Ochoa; Shakira	3:54
3.	"Ciega, Sordomuda"	Estefano Salgado; Shakira	4:38
4.	"The One"	Glen Ballard; Shakira	3:54
5.	"Back in Black" (AC/DC cover)	Angus Young; Malcolm Young; Brian Johnson	5:53
6.	"Rules"	Lester Mendez; Shakira	4:47
7.	"Inevitable"	Ochoa; Shakira	3:36
8.	"Estoy Aquí"	Ochoa; Shakira	5:58
9.	"Underneath Your Clothes"	Mendez; Shakira	4:22
10.	"Octavo Día"	Mendez; Shakira	8:12
11.	"Ready for the Good Times"	Mendez	6:22
12.	"Tú"	Dillon O'Biren; Shakira	4:50
13.	"Poem To A Horse" (Contains the Band Introductions)	Ochoa; Shakira	7:16
14.	"Objection (Tango)"	Shakira	4:44
15.	"Whenever, Wherever"	Gloria Estefan; Mendez; Shakira	10:03

== Personnel ==
=== Musicians ===
- Shakira – vocals, guitar, harmonica
- Tim Mitchell – guitar
- Rita Quintero – backing vocals, keyboards
- Adam Zimmon – guitar
- Albert Sterling Menendez – keyboards
- Pedro Alfonso – violin
- Dan Rothchild – bass guitar
- Brendan Buckley – drums
- Rafael Padilla – percussion

=== Production ===
- Shakira – production
- Tim Mitchell – production
- Dana Austin – production
- Bettina Abascal – post production
- Gonzalo Agulla – executive production
- José Arnal – executive production
- Dominic Morley – engineering
- Richard Robson – engineering
- Neil Tucker – engineering
- Matt Vaughan – engineering
- Richard Wilkinson – engineering
- Adrian Hall – mixing
- Chris Theis – mixing
- Mike Fisher – audio post-production
- Mike Wilder – mastering
- Ramiro Aguilar – video director
- Pablo Arraya – editing

=== Artwork ===
- Jeff Bender – photography
- Frank Ockenfels – photography
- Dan Rothchild – photography
- Ian Cuttler – art direction
- Frank Carbonari – graphic design
- Rose Noone – A&R

== Charts ==
2004 weekly chart performance for Live & off the Record
Chart	Peak position
Austrian Albums (Ö3 Austria)	9
Belgian Albums (Ultratop Flanders)	76
Belgian Albums (Ultratop Wallonia)	43
German Albums (Offizielle Top 100)	14
Finnish Albums (Suomen virallinen lista) DVD chart	3
Portuguese Albums (AFP)	4
Spanish Albums (Promusicae)	73
Swiss Albums (Schweizer Hitparade)	20
US Billboard 200	45

== Certifications ==
Region	Certification	Certified units/sales
Australia (ARIA) DVD	Gold	7,500^{^}
Chile	Platinum	
Colombia Physical sales	Platinum	
France (SNEP) DVD	Gold	10,000^{*}
Germany (BVMI) DVD	3× Gold	75,000^{^}
Mexico (AMPROFON)	Gold	50,000^{^}
Portugal (AFP)	Gold	20,000^{^}
Spain (Promusicae)	Gold	50,000^{^}
South Korea (RIAK)	—	2,834
United States (RIAA) DVD	Gold	50,000^{^}
Summaries
America	—	600,000
^{*} Sales figures based on certification alone.^{^} Shipments figures based on certification alone.

== Release history ==
Country	Date	Label	Format	Catalog
Worldwide	30 March 2004	Sony International	CD, digital download	91109
