= Grandes Éxitos (Shakira album) =

Greatest hits album by Shakira
- Released: 2 November 2002
- Recorded: 1995–2001
- Genre: Latin pop; rock en español
- Length: 52:38
- Label: Sony Music Colombia
- Producer: Tim Mitchell

Shakira chronology
Laundry Service (2001)	Grandes Éxitos (2002)	Live & off the Record (2004)

Shakira video chronology
MTV Unplugged (2000)	Grandes Éxitos (2002)	Live & off the Record (2004)

Professional ratings
Review scores
Source	Rating
Allmusic	4.5/5 stars

Grandes Éxitos (English: Greatest Hits) is the first greatest hits album by Colombian singer-songwriter Shakira. It was released on 2 November 2002, by Sony Music Colombia, one year after her fifth studio album and English-language debut Laundry Service. It is composed of Spanish-language recordings from her third, fourth and fifth studio efforts Pies Descalzos (1995), Dónde Están los Ladrones? (1998) and Laundry Service (2001), along with the live album MTV Unplugged (2000). The album only featured Spanish-language tracks without new recordings. It also did not include songs from her first two studio albums, Magia and Peligro. To promote the album, "Que Me Quedes Tú", "Si Te Vas", and "Ojos Así" released as promotional singles in select countries.

Upon its release, Grandes Éxitos achieved moderate commercial success, it was certified double-platinum (by standards for Latin recordings) for shipments of 200,000 copies by the Recording Industry Association of America (RIAA).

== Track listing ==
Grandes Éxitos - standard edition
No.	Title	Writer(s)	Album	Length
1.	"Estoy Aquí"	Shakira; Luis Fernando Ochoa	Pies Descalzos	3:53
2.	"Antología"	Shakira; Ochoa	Pies Descalzos	4:11
3.	"Un Poco de Amor"	Shakira; Ochoa	Pies Descalzos	4:00
4.	"¿Dónde Estás Corazón?"	Shakira; Ochoa	Pies Descalzos	3:52
5.	"Que Me Quedes Tú"	Shakira; Ochoa	Laundry Service	4:47
6.	"Ciega, Sordomuda"	Shakira; Estefano Salgado	Dónde Están los Ladrones?	4:28
7.	"Si Te Vas"	Shakira; Ochoa	Dónde Están los Ladrones?	3:30
8.	"No Creo" (Live)	Shakira; Ochoa	MTV Unplugged	4:13
9.	"Inevitable"	Shakira; Ochoa	Dónde Están los Ladrones?	3:13
10.	"Ojos Así"	Shakira; Pablo Flores; Javier Garza	Dónde Están los Ladrones?	3:59
11.	"Suerte"	Shakira; Gloria Estefan; Tim Mitchell	Laundry Service	3:14
12.	"Te Aviso, Te Anuncio (Tango)"	Shakira	Laundry Service	3:42
13.	"Tú" (Live)	Shakira; Dillon O'Brien	MTV Unplugged	4:52
14.	"Dónde Están los Ladrones?" (Live)	Shakira; Ochoa	MTV Unplugged	3:29
15.	"Moscas en la Casa"	Shakira	Dónde Están los Ladrones?	3:31

Grandes Éxitos - 2005 reissue bonus disc (VCD)
No.	Title	Length
1.	"Shakira: Servicio de Lavandería (Entrevista Especial)"	24:18

== Personnel ==
- Shakira - Producer, vocals, guitar
- Emilio Estefan Jr. - Executive producer
- Tim Mitchell — Compilation producer
- Luis Fernando Ochoa — Producer, songwriter
- Lester Mendez — Producer
- Pablo Florez — Producer, songwriter
- Javier Garza — Producer
- Ted Jensen — Mastering
- Leila Cobo — Liner notes
- Omar Cruz — Photography
- Ignacio Gurruchaga — Photography
- Ian Cuttler — Package design

== Charts ==
Chart	Peak position
Argentine Albums (CAPIF)	8
Finnish Album Chart	18
Portuguese Album Chart	14
Spanish Album Chart	36
Swedish Album Chart	22
Swiss Album Chart	49
U.S. Billboard 200	80
U.S. Billboard Latin Pop	1
U.S. Billboard Top Latin Albums	1

Chart (2020)	Peak position
US Latin Pop Albums	15

=== Year-end charts ===
Chart (2003)	Position
US Top Latin Albums (Billboard)	3
US Latin Pop Albums (Billboard)	3

== Certifications and sales ==
Region	Certification	Certified units/sales
Argentina (CAPIF)	Platinum	40,000^{^}
Chile	11× Platinum	
Colombia Physical sales	Diamond+Platinum	
Colombia Digital sales	Gold	
Mexico (AMPROFON)	Platinum+Gold	225,000^{^}
Portugal (AFP)	Silver	10,000^{^}
Spain (Promusicae)	Platinum	100,000^{^}
United States (RIAA)	2× Platinum (Latin)	200,000^{^}
^{^} Shipments figures based on certification alone.

== Release history ==
Region	Date	Format	Label	Catalog
Worldwide	5 November 2002	CD, digital download	Sony International	5098749
