= Te Dejo Madrid =

2002 single by Shakira

- Promotional CD single cover

Single by Shakira

from the album Laundry Service
- Released: 21 January 2002
- Recorded: 2001
- Studio: The Hit Factory (Miami, FL); Compass Point Studios (Nassau, Bahamas); Crescent Moon Studios (Miami, FL)
- Genre: Latin pop; pop rock; rock en español
- Length: 3:07
- Label: Epic
- Composers: Shakira; Tim Mitchell; George Noriega
- Lyricist: Shakira
- Producer: Shakira

Shakira singles chronology
"Whenever, Wherever" (2001)	"Te Dejo Madrid" (2002)	"Underneath Your Clothes" (2002)

Music video
- "Te Dejo Madrid" on YouTube

"Te Dejo Madrid" (English: "I'm Leaving You Madrid") is a song recorded by Colombian singer-songwriter Shakira for her fifth studio album, Laundry Service (2001). It was written by the singer about the city of Madrid, the capital of Spain. The music video for it featured the singer as a bullfighter. Although it was released as the second single from the album in several European countries in 2002, it was not released in the United States. "Te Dejo Madrid" was a commercial success in Spain, peaking at number seven, but did not repeat the success of Shakira's previous singles in Latin America, peaking at number 45 on Billboard's Hot Latin Songs. The song saw additional production by Lester Mendez.

== Music video ==
In the music video, Shakira is seen lying on a bed and in front of a mirror in a bullfighting costume. The television shows scenes from a bullfighting performance. It shows Shakira then running to the stadium, where these performances are recorded, with a pair of large scissors. When she arrives, there is a man, who is the bullfighter, inside the ring, who is pictured throughout the video as maybe her lover, who is looking in the mirror at himself. Shakira flips the mirror around so she is facing the bullfighter. Shakira is shown with a bull mask on and she is portrayed as the bull. They come face to face and she touches his lips, but turns away and plays the harmonica solo. The video ends with Shakira cutting off her long hair in the mirror.

Spanish bullfighter Julián López Escobar, better known by his stage name El Juli, filed a lawsuit against Shakira for using scenes of one of his performances in the music video for "Te Dejo Madrid" without his permission. She was sued for five million dollars for "plagiarism of image in use and exercise of his profession".

== Live performances ==
In 2002 and 2003, Shakira performed the song live on her Tour of the Mongoose. However, the song was performed only on the Spanish-speaking countries which were visited for the tour. In 2006 and 2007, Shakira performed the song on every concert of her Oral Fixation Tour. In 2010 and 2011, Shakira performed the song on every concert of her The Sun Comes Out World Tour. The song was added to the setlist of the Las Mujeres Ya No Lloran World Tour, during her residency in Madrid at the Shakira Stadium, a temporary venue built specifically for this residency at the Iberdrola Music open-air space in Villaverde.

== Charts ==
Weekly chart performance for "Te Dejo Madrid"
Chart (2001–2002)	Peak position
Nicaragua (Notimex)	2
Spain (Promusicae)	7
US Hot Latin Songs (Billboard)	45
US Latin Pop Airplay (Billboard)	22

=== Year-end charts ===
Chart (2002)	Position
Spain (AFYVE)	25

== Certifications ==
Region	Certification	Certified units/sales
Mexico (AMPROFON)	Platinum+Gold	90,000^{‡}
^{‡} Sales+streaming figures based on certification alone.

== Release history ==
Release dates and formats for "Te Dejo Madrid"
Region	Date	Format(s)	Label(s)	Ref.
Spain	21 January 2002	Contemporary hit radio	Sony Music	
Spain	28 January 2002	Adult contemporary radio	Sony Music	
