= Underneath Your Clothes =

2002 single by Shakira

Single by Shakira

from the album Laundry Service
- Released: 11 February 2002
- Studio: The Hit Factory, Crescent Moon (Miami, Florida); Compass Point (Nassau, Bahamas)
- Genre: Rock; pop rock
- Length: 3:44
- Label: Epic
- Composers: Shakira; Lester Mendez
- Lyricist: Shakira
- Producer: Shakira

Shakira singles chronology
"Te Dejo Madrid" (2001)	"Underneath Your Clothes" (2002)	"Objection (Tango)" (2002)

Music video
- "Underneath Your Clothes" on YouTube

"Underneath Your Clothes" is a song by Colombian singer-songwriter Shakira for her fifth studio album and English-language debut, Laundry Service (2001). The power ballad was the second English-language single released from the album; being released on 11 February 2002. It features lyrics by Shakira with music by Shakira and Lester Mendez. Production was handled by Shakira with additional production by Mendez. Lyrically, the song tells the story of the unconditional love that a woman has for her boyfriend, with lyrics about being worthy of somebody's love.

Some critics commended the song for being a highlight from the album. However, others were more critical towards her songwriting and the song's production, which according to them resembled the Bangles' "Eternal Flame" and the Beatles' "Penny Lane". The song became a success on the charts, topping the charts of eight countries, while also reaching the top ten in several countries, including the United States. It was the fifth-biggest song of 2002 in Europe.

The accompanying music video for the song was directed by fashion photographer Herb Ritts. It depicts Shakira's loneliness as a tourist musician. It features Shakira's then-boyfriend Antonio de la Rúa, whose unpopularity in Argentina led to a ban of her albums there. Shakira promoted the song with a series of live performances across the world, while also performing it on her worldwide tours, Tour of the Mongoose (2002–2003), Oral Fixation Tour (2006–2007), The Sun Comes Out World Tour (2010–2011) and El Dorado World Tour (2018).

== Background and release ==
After releasing her first live album, MTV Unplugged: Shakira (2000), which won her first Grammy Award for Best Latin Pop Album at the 43rd Annual Grammy Awards, Shakira expressed the desire to breakthrough in the United States and the world with songs in English. With the help of a personal tutor, and after studying the lyrics of Bob Dylan and the poetry of Walt Whitman, she started writing songs in English "with a dictionary in one hand and a thesaurus in the other." During the songwriting process for Laundry Service, Shakira wrote "Underneath Your Clothes" as a love song for then-boyfriend Antonio de la Rúa. She explained that, "If you check the subject of my songs, most of them talk about my own experiences and feelings and what I was actually going through in my life." "Underneath Your Clothes" was released to US radio stations as the second single from the album in February 2002, while the physical single was released in May 2002.

== Composition and lyrics ==
"Underneath Your Clothes" has lyrics and production by Shakira, and music by Shakira and Lester Mendez. Both arranged the track, while Mendez also provided keyboards and horn arrangements, while Shakira and Rita Quintero also serving with background vocals. Additional production was also handled by Mendez. It was recorded at The Hit Factory, Miami, Florida, Compass Point Studios, Bahamas, while being mixed and recorded at the Crescent Moon Studios, Miami, Florida. According to the sheet music published at MusicNotes.com by Sony/ATV Music Publishing, "Underneath Your Clothes" is written in the key of A♭ major, set in a moderately slow tempo of 88 beats per minute. Shakira's vocal range spans from the low note of A♭3 to the high note of C5. The introduction follows the chord progression of A♭–D♭–A♭–D♭-Fm, while the verses follow the chord progression of Cm-D♭–E♭sus–E♭.

Lyrically, the song is an “ode” to the positivity one gains when pursuing a relationship with a good person, with Shakira “mentally undress[ing] her man, fantasizing about the ‘territory’ she claims as her own”. As noted by Chuck Taylor of Billboard, the song is “a thought-provoking ballad that finds a novel way to deliver a message of love and devotion.” “Underneath your clothes/There’s an endless story/There’s the man I chose/That’s my territory”, she sings. During the song, she “repeatedly describes herself as a good girl, worthy of her boyfriend’s love, and as a woman of very developed maternal instincts”. As noted by Alexis Petridis of The Guardian and Matt Cibula of PopMatters, the song has “a Beatles-influenced brass arrangement” and a melody from the Bangles’ “Eternal Flame”.

== Critical reception ==
"Underneath Your Clothes" received good critical reception as it represented "a large part of Shakira's style". While calling her voice "odd", Chuck Taylor of Billboard wrote that it "dart[s] from a delicate, girlie, Jewel-like delivery to a determined, tough-chick croon - it certainly gives the song a signature edge and multiple layers that seem to draw out something new with each successive spin." Lisa Oliver of Yahoo! Music claimed to find similarities between Shakira's and Jewel's vocals, calling it "a Jewel-esque ground swelling". Ted Kessler of The Observer noted that the song "may be slightly kooky pop-rock, but it's sung by someone with the range of an operatic diva." Alex Henderson of AllMusic picked the song as a highlight from the album, while Robert Christgau wrote that its lyrics have an "awkward, carnal, unhesitatingly female chauvinist." Matt Cibula of PopMatters said that "it could have been a great little thing, [...] simple, graceful, light, but now it's a damned mess," citing the "tell-tale touches" at the start, the Bangles’ "Eternal Flame" influence and "Penny Lane" trumpets by the end" as examples. Cibula called it "a potentially cool song [that] has been studioed out of existence." Frank Kogan of The Village Voice criticized the lyrics, calling it a song "with no fresh insights on the subject."

=== Accolades ===
"Underneath Your Clothes" is listed at number 391 on Blender's "The 500 Greatest Songs Since You Were Born" list. Bill Lamb of About.com picked the song at number four on his "Top 10 Shakira Pop Songs", while Robert Copsey of Digital Spy placed the song at number 3 on their "Shakira's 10 best songs", writing that it "remains the ultimate Shakira ballad for the mere fact that we can still remember every single world of it to this day." The website Latin Post ranked it as her eighth biggest hit, calling it "a powerful ballad." The song entered Billboard's list of her biggest hits at number 5.

== Commercial performance ==
The song was commercially successful and peaked atop the charts in Australia, Austria, and Belgium; being certified platinum in the three countries. In Australia, the song debuted at number two, peaking two weeks later at the top of the charts, while spending 20 weeks inside the ARIA Charts. In Austria, "Underneath Your Clothes" debuted at number two, remaining for three consecutive weeks at the position, before moving to the top the following week. The song topped the charts of Hungary, Ireland and Netherlands. In other countries, the song experienced commercial success, reaching number two in France, Germany, New Zealand, Norway and Switzerland.

In other countries, it became a top five or a top-10 hit. In the United States, "Underneath Your Clothes" entered the charts at number 70 on the Billboard Hot 100 in March 2002. In its fourth week, the song entered the top 40 at number 33, while cracking the top 20 two weeks later. The song eventually peaked at number nine, on the issue dated 18 May 2002 becoming her second top-10 hit on the chart. According to Sony Music Canada, the song has been certified as gold in the United States. In the United Kingdom, it reached number three, becoming her second consecutive top-three single. It entered the Eurochart Hot 100 Singles of 2002 at number five, while her other single "Whenever Wherever" was placed at number 2.

== Music video ==
=== Background and storyline ===
Shakira and former boyfriend Antonio de la Rúa in the music video. His appearance in the music video caused controversy in Argentina.

American photographer Herb Ritts directed the music video for "Underneath Your Clothes", his last music video directorial effort before his death in December 2002. It starts with a black-and-white scene of a reporter asking Shakira how she feels about crossing over into the English-speaking music market, and the singer, ironically, answers him in Spanish. Shakira claimed in her MTV Making the Video special for the song that the "Crossover" claims had been her daily bread, and that she heavily at wished for this to be included into the video. The video illustrates her loneliness as a music artist when she goes on tour. Then, scenes of the singer performing the song live with her band and passionately hugging her boyfriend (played by her real-life then boyfriend Antonio de la Rúa) are shown.

=== Reception ===
The appearance of Antonio de la Rúa in the video led to music retailer Tower Records Argentina banning sales of her albums in the country. The reason behind the ban was that de la Rua's father Fernando de la Rúa, who was the President of Argentina at that time, had resigned "in the midst of profound economic and political turmoil in the country", and the decision to ban sales of Shakira's albums was a "direct protest against Antonio De la Rúa - not Shakira".

== Live performances ==
To promote the single, Shakira performed the song at various programs and events. She performed the track on the television programs CD:UK, Domingo Legal, Late Show with David Letterman, Total Request Live and the 2002 Party in the Park event at Hyde Park among others. The limited edition of the album, entitled Laundry Service: Washed & Dried (2002) presented an acoustic version of the song as a bonus track. She performed an acoustic version of the song on VH1 Divas Live in Las Vegas (2002). The singer's second live album, Live & off the Record (2004), presented a live version of the song performed during an April 2003 concert in Rotterdam, Netherlands, which was part of the singer's Tour of the Mongoose (2002–2003). Shakira performed the song live at the concerts for her Oral Fixation Tour (2006–2007) and The Sun Comes Out World Tour (2010–2011), however the song was not in the set-list of the Spanish and Latin American concerts. The performances were included on the Oral Fixation Tour and the Live from Paris CD/DVD, respectively. Shakira presented a piano mix of the song at the Ein Herz für Kinder and Clinton Global Initiative events, with only vocals and piano, and excluded the complete second half of the song. The song was also included in the 2025–2026 Las Mujeres Ya No Lloran World Tour. On July 20, 2026, Shakira performed a duet of the song with Ed Sheeran during her New York City concert at Barclays Center.

== Cover versions ==
- Irish singer Kieran Goss covered "Underneath Your Clothes" for the charity album Even Better Than the Real Thing Vol. 1.
- Swedish singer Amy Diamond covered it on the 2004 Super Troupers compilation album.
- Brazilian girl group Rouge performed a Portuguese version called "Você Me Roubou" ("You Stole Me").
- Diana Tobar in series 7 of Spanish talent show Operación Triunfo (Operation Triumph) in 2009 covered the song.
- Shakira performed the song with German band Big Soul on the 2010 season 1 finale of the German version of X Factor.

== Track listings ==
CD maxi

1. "Underneath Your Clothes" (album version) – 3:44
2. "Underneath Your Clothes" (acoustic version) – 3:55
3. "Underneath Your Clothes" (Mendez club radio edit) – 3:24
4. "Underneath Your Clothes" (Thunderpuss club mix) – 6:52
5. "Underneath Your Clothes" (video)

CD single

1. "Underneath Your Clothes" (album version) – 3:44
2. "Underneath Your Clothes" (acoustic version) – 3:55

== Personnel ==
- Production by Shakira
- Additional production by Lester Mendez for Living Stereo
- Arranged by Shakira and Lester Mendez
- Keyboards: Lester Mendez
- Guitars: Tim Pierce and Brian Ray
- Bass: Paul Bushnell
- Percussion: Richard Bravo
- Drums: Abraham Laboriel Jr.
- Horn arrangements: Lester Mendez
- Horn charts and direction: Camilo Valencia
- Trumpet: Tony Concepción
- Trumpet and piccolo trumpet: Jim Hacker
- Baritone and tenor sax: Ed Calle
- Bass trombone and tuba: Joe Barati
- Trombone and bass trombone: Dane Teboe
- Background vocals: Shakira and Rita Quintero
- Recording engineers: Terry Manning, Javier Garza and Gustavo Celis
- Mixing engineer: Eric Schilling
- Additional engineers: Carlos Paucar, Mike Couzzi, Jorge González and Alfred Figueroa
- Assistant engineers: Jorge González, Tony Mardini, Ken Theis, Ed Williams, Chris Carroll, Christine Tramontano, Nicholas Marshall, Oswald Bowe and Alex Dixon

== Charts ==
=== Weekly charts ===
2002 weekly chart performance for "Underneath Your Clothes"
Chart (2002)	Peak position
Australia (ARIA)	1
Austria (Ö3 Austria Top 40)	1
Belgium (Ultratop 50 Flanders)	1
Belgium (Ultratop 50 Wallonia)	7
Canada (Nielsen SoundScan)	11
Croatia International Airplay (HRT)	1
Czech Republic (IFPI)	1
Denmark (Tracklisten)	4
Europe (Eurochart Hot 100)	2
Finland (Suomen virallinen lista)	8
France (SNEP)	2
Germany (GfK)	2
Greece (IFPI)	6
Hungary (Rádiós Top 40)	9
Hungary (Single Top 40)	1
Ireland (IRMA)	1
Italy (FIMI)	3
Netherlands (Dutch Top 40)	1
Netherlands (Single Top 100)	2
New Zealand (Recorded Music NZ)	2
Norway (VG-lista)	2
Poland (Polish Airplay Charts)	2
Portugal (AFP)	1
Romania (Romanian Top 100)	8
Sweden (Sverigetopplistan)	3
Switzerland (Schweizer Hitparade)	2
UK Singles (Official Charts)	3
US Billboard Hot 100	9
US Adult Pop Airplay (Billboard)	25
US Dance Club Songs (Billboard) Remixes	5
US Pop Airplay (Billboard)	4
US Rhythmic Airplay (Billboard)	39

2020 weekly chart performance for "Underneath Your Clothes"
Chart (2020)	Peak position
US Latin Digital Songs (Billboard)	10

=== Year-end charts ===
Year-end chart performance for "Underneath Your Clothes"
Chart (2002)	Position
Australia (ARIA)	11
Austria (Ö3 Austria Top 40)	7
Belgium (Ultratop 50 Flanders)	5
Belgium (Ultratop 50 Wallonia)	18
Brazil (Crowley)	28
Canada Radio (Nielsen BDS)	30
Canada (Nielsen SoundScan)	137
Europe (Eurochart Hot 100)	5
France (SNEP)	29
Germany (Media Control)	8
Ireland (IRMA)	13
Italy (FIMI)	28
Netherlands (Dutch Top 40)	15
Netherlands (Single Top 100)	11
New Zealand (RIANZ)	14
Sweden (Hitlistan)	12
Switzerland (Schweizer Hitparade)	4
UK Singles (OCC)	41
US Billboard Hot 100	66
US Adult Top 40 (Billboard)	81
US Mainstream Top 40 (Billboard)	30

=== Decade-end charts ===
Decade-end chart performance for "Underneath Your Clothes"
Chart (2000–2009)	Position
Austria (Ö3 Austria Top 40)	48
Germany (Media Control GfK)	88
Netherlands (Dutch Top 40)	72

== Certifications ==
Certifications and sales for "Underneath Your Clothes"
Region	Certification	Certified units/sales
Australia (ARIA)	2× Platinum	140,000^{^}
Austria (IFPI Austria)	Platinum	40,000^{*}
Belgium (BRMA)	Platinum	50,000^{*}
Canada (Music Canada)	Gold	40,000^{‡}
Denmark (IFPI Danmark)	Gold	45,000^{‡}
France (SNEP)	Gold	250,000^{*}
Germany (BVMI)	Gold	250,000^{^}
Mexico (AMPROFON)	2× Platinum+Gold	150,000^{‡}
Switzerland (IFPI Switzerland)	Platinum	40,000^{^}
United Kingdom (BPI)	Gold	400,000^{‡}
United States (RIAA)	Gold	500,000^{‡}
^{*} Sales figures based on certification alone.^{^} Shipments figures based on certification alone.^{‡} Sales+streaming figures based on certification alone.

== Release history ==
Release dates and formats for "Underneath Your Clothes"
Region	Date	Format(s)	Label(s)	Ref.
United States	11 February 2002	Contemporary hit radio	Epic	
Australia	29 April 2002	CD	Sony Music	
Germany	7 June 2002	CD	Sony Music	
Germany	10 June 2002	Maxi CD	Sony Music	
France	24 June 2002	Maxi CD	Sony Music	
United Kingdom	22 July 2002	Cassette; CD	Epic	
United Kingdom	29 July 2002	12-inch vinyl	Epic	
Japan	31 July 2002	CD	Sony Music	
France	26 August 2002	12-inch vinyl	Sony Music	
