= Que Me Quedes Tú =

2002 single by Shakira

- Mexican promotional single cover

Single by Shakira

from the album Laundry Service
- Released: 11 November 2002
- Recorded: 2001
- Studio: The Hit Factory (Miami, FL); Compass Point Studios (Nassau, Bahamas); Crescent Moon Studios (Miami, FL); Nomad Music (Miami, FL)
- Genre: Rock en español; soft rock
- Length: 4:48
- Label: Epic
- Composers: Shakira; Luis Fernando Ochoa
- Lyricist: Shakira
- Producer: Shakira

Shakira singles chronology
"Objection (Tango)" (2002)	"Que Me Quedes Tú" (2002)	"The One" (2003)

Music video
- "Que Me Quedes Tú" on YouTube

"Que Me Quedes Tú" (English: "May You Stay With Me") is a song by Colombian singer-songwriter Shakira from her fifth studio album Laundry Service (2001). It was written by Shakira and composed by her alongside longtime friend Luis Fernando Ochoa. The song was released as the fifth single from Laundry Service and the lead single from her first Spanish-language greatest hits album Grandes Éxitos (2002) on 11 November 2002 by Epic Records.

"Que Me Quedes Tú" was a commercial success throughout the Spanish-speaking markets, peaking atop the Billboard Hot Latin Tracks chart.

== Music video ==
The accompanying music video for "Que Me Quedes Tú" was directed by Argentinian directors Ramiro Agula and Esteban Sapir, who also directed the music video for "The One" and the DVD Live & off the Record.

== Music and lyrics ==
The song begins with "a sitar-like riff". Its lyrics list all the things Shakira is "willing to sacrifice before losing the love of her life". Paste's Mark Kemp characterised the track as "spare" and "twangy".

== Critical reception ==
Griselda Flores of Billboard described the single a "quintessential can’t-live-without-you love song" and a "masterclass in songwriting". "Que Me Quedes Tú" was included on best-of lists including Billboard's "The 100 Greatest Songs of 2003" (2023), at number 41, being the highest ranked Spanish-language song on the list, only behind "Bonito" by Jarabe de Palo. While reviewing Fijación Oral, Vol. 1 (2005) for Paste, Mark Kemp recalled "Que Me Quedes Tú" as one of the highlights of Laundry Service (2001) back in the day, stating that the song was "light years ahead of anything the American pop gals were doing" at the time.

Select year-end rankings of Que Me Quedes Tú
Publication	List	Rank	Ref.
Billboard	The 100 Greatest Songs of 2003	41	

== Format and track listing ==
Digital download

1. "Que Me Quedes Tú" - 4:48

== Charts ==
=== Weekly charts ===
Chart (2002–2003)	Peak position
Costa Rica (Notimex)	2
Guatemala (Notimex)	2
Panama (Notimex)	3
Romania (Romanian Top 100)	29
Uruguay (Notimex)	4
Spain (Promusicae)	10
US Hot Latin Songs (Billboard)	1
US Latin Pop Airplay (Billboard)	1

=== Year-end charts ===
Chart (2003)	Position
Romania (Romanian Top 100)	65
US Hot Latin Songs (Billboard)	8
US Latin Pop Airplay (Billboard)	5

== Certifications ==
Region	Certification	Certified units/sales
Mexico (AMPROFON)	4× Platinum	240,000^{‡}
^{‡} Sales+streaming figures based on certification alone.

== Release history ==
Release dates and formats for "Que Me Quedes Tú"
Region	Date	Format(s)	Label(s)	Ref.
Spain	11 November 2002	Adult contemporary radio; contemporary hit radio	Sony Music	
