= The One (Shakira song) =

2002 single by Shakira

Single by Shakira

from the album Laundry Service
- Released: 16 December 2002
- Studio: Hit Factory Criteria, Crescent Moon (Miami, Florida); Compass Point (Nassau, Bahamas)
- Length: 3:42 (album version); 3:47 (video and radio mix)
- Label: Epic
- Composers: Shakira; Glen Ballard
- Lyricist: Shakira
- Producer: Shakira

Shakira singles chronology
| "Que Me Quedes Tú" (2002) | "The One" (2002) | "Poem to a Horse" (2004) |

Music video
- "The One" on YouTube

"The One" is a song recorded by Colombian singer-songwriter Shakira for her first English-language and fifth overall studio album Laundry Service (2001). The ballad was written and produced by Shakira, with additional writing by Glen Ballard and co-production by Lester Mendez. It was released as the album's sixth and final single on 16 December 2002 by Epic Records and became a modest hit in Europe and Australia.

Lyrically, the power ballad talks about receiving comfort and support from someone in tough times. Critics were divided with the song; some praised the production but a few criticized its lyrics due to the unusual usage of some words. The music video for the song was released in early 2003 and was directed by Ramiro Agulla. In it, she is drenched by the rain, whilst people receive comfort from those who they love. It was only performed on its parent album tour, the 2002–2003 Tour of the Mongoose.

== Background and composition ==
"The One" was written and produced by Shakira, with words by Shakira, music by Shakira and Glen Ballard, and co-production by Lester Mendez. Mendez was also responsible for keyboards and arrangement, alongside Shakira. Strings were arranged and conducted by David Campbell. Guitar was handled by Tim Pierce and Brian Ray. Paul Bushnell, Richard Bravo and Abraham Laboriel provided bass, percussion and drums respectively. Joel Derouin was the concert master, while Suzie Katayama was the song's contractor.

Lyrically, "The One" talks about receiving comfort from the one the protagonist loves between the ups and downs of life. As noted by Bob Waliszewski of Plugged In, in it, Shakira "dreams of settling down with a man who wants kids and will take her to church on Sunday". As written by the Barry and District News, it "perfectly describes the showbiz world with 'In a world full of strangers you're the one I know'." During the song, she also "alludes to her thongs", singing: "To buy more thongs and write more happy songs, it always takes a little help from someone", which was seen as odd.

== Release ==
After releasing five singles from Laundry Service, Shakira released "The One" as the album's sixth and final single worldwide. Initially, it was released in the United States to mainstream radio on 16 December 2002 as the album's fourth single, following "Objection (Tango)". The primary version used for radio airplay was the Glen's Radio Mix, which has a new intro and a complete different musical arrangement than the original album's version. In 2003, a CD single featuring the Glen's Radio Mix was released on 13 January 2003 alongside the original version, and remixes from the singles "Whenever, Wherever" and "Te Aviso, Te Anuncio (Tango)". Another CD single featuring the song and the music video, as well as two remixes of "Objection (Tango)" was released throughout Europe during March and April 2003.

== Critical reception ==
"The One" received mixed reviews from music critics, with many praising her vocals while some criticized its lyrics. The Billboard Magazine Staff praised Shakira's vocals, calling her "vocally gifted" and that she "absolutely shines on the Led Zeppelin-inflected ballad". Ernesto Lechner of Rolling Stone agreed with the "crunch" Led Zeppelin inspiration, praising both "The One" and "Eyes Like Yours" as the album's best tracks. Isabelia Herrera wrote for Pitchfork that she excels on "The One", noting that "Shakira empties her body, harnessing anguish and devotion and tracing a blueprint for so many young people’s journeys of femme self-discovery." A reviewer from the website RTÉ called it an "Alanis-lite introspection."

Some criticism came from Matt Cibula from PopMatters who thought the lyrics were "funny and original", but criticized what he perceived as the "cheesy guitar solo, more of those damned strings, and suddenly this sweet confessional song is a power ballad now." For Alexis Petridis of The Guardian, "every song contains at least one non sequitur so eccentric that it could be the work of 1970s rock surrealist Captain Beefheart citing the lines "To buy more thongs and write more happy songs, it always takes a little help from someone," as an example.

== Chart performance ==
"The One" debuted on the ARIA Singles Chart at number 16, its peak position, on 26 January 2003. It became the album's fourth top-twenty hit, remaining at the top-twenty for three weeks and inside the top-fifty for eight weeks. The song did moderately well in European countries, including Italy and Switzerland, where it reached the top 20. It was a top-five hit in Portugal, where it peaked at number five.

== Music video ==
The music video for "The One" was directed by Ramiro Agulla and premiered in January 2003. In it, Shakira is walking through a city, wearing a red jacket, where she sees all the people with their lovers loving and hugging each other, while she is alone. She therefore walks through the rain, hoping to find someone who will love her forever. While she walks through the rain, she sees an old couple, a mother with her child, a police attacking a man with an old woman watching, needing someone to help him and he mimes "you're the one I need", while on the contrary she is alone. The music video ends with her, drenched by the rain, singing while facing up to the sky.

== Live performance ==
"The One" was only featured on its parent album tour, "Tour of the Mongoose" during 2002 and 2003. During the performance, the message "The surest way to happiness is to lose yourself in a cause greater than yourself" is displayed on the background screen [...], followed by an ER-esque scene showing a rock star fighting for their life on a hospital bed and surviving." It was later included on its parent album, Live & off the Record (2004). The performance was praised by Elena Basanta from Cadena 100 who noted that Shakira handled well the ballad, "inspiring an audience of thousands to sing along to it."

== Track listings ==
Maxi-CD single

1. "The One" (Glen's radio mix) – 3:47
2. "The One" (album version) – 3:43
3. "Whenever, Wherever" (Hammad Bell remix) – 3:48
4. "Te Aviso, Te Anuncio (Tango)" (Gigi D'Agostino Tango remix) – 6:10

Enhanced single

1. "The One" (Glen's mix)
2. "Objection (Tango)" (Afro Punk version)
3. "Objection (Tango)" (The Freelance Hellraiser's Mash-Up of the Mongoose)
4. "The One" (video)

== Charts ==
=== Weekly charts ===
Weekly chart performance for "The One"
| Chart (2003) | Peak position |
|---|---|
| Australia (ARIA) | 16 |
| Austria (Ö3 Austria Top 40) | 21 |
| Belgium (Ultratop 50 Flanders) | 21 |
| Belgium (Ultratop 50 Wallonia) | 21 |
| Eurochart Hot 100 (Music & Media) | 78 |
| Germany (GfK) | 39 |
| Italy (FIMI) | 20 |
| Netherlands (Dutch Top 40) | 26 |
| Netherlands (Single Top 100) | 31 |
| New Zealand (Recorded Music NZ) | 39 |
| Poland (Polish Airplay Chart) | 10 |
| Portugal (AFP) | 5 |
| Romania (Romanian Top 100) | 14 |
| Switzerland (Schweizer Hitparade) | 17 |

=== Year-end charts ===
Year-end chart performance for "The One"
| Chart (2003) | Position |
|---|---|
| Romania (Romanian Top 100) | 88 |

== Release history ==
Release dates and formats for "The One"
| Region | Date | Format(s) | Label(s) | Ref. |
|---|---|---|---|---|
| United States | 16 December 2002 | Contemporary hit radio | Epic | |
| Australia | 13 January 2003 | Maxi CD | Sony Music Australia | |
| Belgium | 30 March 2003 | CD; maxi CD | Epic | |
| Denmark | 7 April 2003 | CD | Epic | |
