= Tour of the Mongoose =

2002–03 concert tour by Shakira

- Tour by Shakira
- Promotional poster for the tour
- Location: Europe; North America; South America
- Associated album: Laundry Service
- Start date: November 8, 2002
- End date: May 11, 2003
- No. of shows: 61

Shakira concert chronology
- Tour Anfibio (2000); Tour of the Mongoose (2002–2003); Oral Fixation Tour (2006–2007)

The Tour of the Mongoose (also known as El Tour de la Mangosta in Spanish-speaking regions) was the third concert tour by Colombian singer-songwriter Shakira, launched in support of her fifth studio album—and debut English-language record— Laundry Service (2001). It was her first global tour, visiting North and South America and Europe.

== Background ==
Clear Channel Entertainment announced the Tour of the Mongoose in September 2002. The tour came shortly after Shakira reached international success with her third studio album. During a press conference in New York City, Shakira summarized her show as an "entertaining rock show", stating, "I'm not saving any effort to make sure that this concert [tour] will be the best I can offer to my fans. And it's going to have a strong spirit of rock and roll, so you will see a rock-and-roll show, but it will have all of the nuances and the subtleties of a show that attempts to entertain".

At the same press conference, Shakira explained the tour's name as symbolizing the strength of the mongoose, stating "...I was really impressed by it because it is an animal that can defeat the snake with just a bite. It's like a living miracle, this animal, to me, because if there's an animal on earth that can defeat the snake—a venomous viper—with a bite, I think that there's got to be some way for us to defeat, or to bite the neck of hatred in this world, no? "It's called the Tour of the Mongoose, and the mongoose is basically one of the few animals who can defeat the most venomous snakes with just one bite and that's why I decided to name my tour that way, because I think that if we all have a little mongoose inside that can defeat the hatred and the resentment and the prejudice of everyday, we can probably win the battle." At the tour commencement, Corey Moss of MTV compared the singer to Britney Spears, Tommy Lee, Elvis Presley, Sheryl Crow and Rage Against the Machine.

== Controversy ==
=== Anti-war message ===
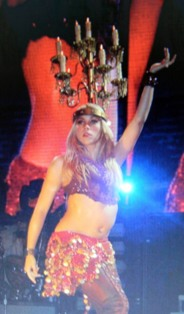
Shakira performing the closing number "Whenever, Wherever" in Rotterdam.

The show sparked some controversy due to a perceived anti-war message in a video played prior to the performance of "Octavo Día", displaying war footage and later revealing the Grim Reaper to be a puppeteer. Shakira defended the video, stating,

"I think that we see war as a virtual thing and we even get to believe that bombs fall on top of cardboard cutouts and stuff like that, they don't. They kill real people, real children, real mothers and millions of innocent people. I come from Colombia, which is a country that has been under the whip of violence for more than four decades, so I've seen the consequences of war and I've seen the psychological damage that it does in a society. And I think that we're never ready for war. I just feel that there are always pacifist solutions, and I think that the leaders know the exit to the conflict, it's just that sometimes they don't want to use them, they just want to continue playing their little game of power. And I feel that us people have the responsibility and also the obligation to demand to our leaders to give us the pacifist solutions. To give us a world in peace."

=== Argentina controversy ===
In 1999, Shakira began a relationship with Argentine lawyer Antonio de la Rúa, the son of the then president of Argentina Fernando de la Rúa. This led to huge backlash in the country due to the social and economic crisis happening at the time in the nation. After the December 2001 riots in Argentina, many groups, including journalists and music retailers, sought to boycott Shakira's career in the country. In February 2002, Pablo di Paola, the then president of Tower Records Argentina took the decision to stop selling Shakira's albums in the country. In the documentary for her video album Live & off the Record (2004), Shakira revealed that trying to bring the tour to Argentina in 2003 turned into a "real soup opera" with a lot of discussion happening behind closed doors, with her team and then manager Freddy DeMann trying to persuade her to skip the country during the tour. The tour's production manager, Chris Lamband, and the tour manager, Fitzjoy Hellin, called the situation "insane." Shakira stated: "Not only the press was an issue, but logistics were nearly impossible and certainly unprofitable." Nevertheless, Shakira decided to go to Argentina despite the controversy.

On May 3, 2003, Shakira performed at Argentina's River Plate stadium, the sold-out show had over 60,000 people in attendance, including Argentinian celebrities and politicians such as actor Mariano Martínez, former vicepresident of Argentina Daniel Scioli and the former first lady of Argentina Inés Pertiné Urien. According to Argentine magazine Gente, her then boyfriend Antonio de la Rúa decided to not attend due to the controversy.

== Commercial performance ==
Shakira became the first Latin female artist to perform at Argentina's Estadio Monumental Antonio Vespucio Liberti (River Plate stadium), the sold-out show had over 60,000 people in attendance. The concert in Santiago, Chile broke Luis Miguel's record of most expensive concert tickets in the country due to Shakira's huge global popularity and high demand. The show in Atlantic Pavilion, Lisbon has attracted 19,136 people which has broken attendance record holding by American rock trio R.E.M.

== Broadcast and recordings ==
The tour was shot in Rotterdam, The Netherlands on April 22, 2003. The tour was chronicled on Live & off the Record. The disc included selected songs from the concert, along with a documentary showing the performer preparing for the show, her song writing process and her ideas about social responsibility. It also includes a live CD that features ten songs that were performed during the show. The CD spun off two singles, "Poem to a Horse" and "Whenever, Wherever Live". In a special edition of Fijación Oral, Vol. 1 the performances of "Fool" and "Dónde Están los Ladrones?" were included.

== Setlist ==
Anglophone
1. "Ojos Así"
2. "Si Te Vas"
3. "Fool"
4. "Ciega, Sordomuda"
5. "The One"
6. "Dude (Looks Like A Lady)" (Aerosmith cover; contains elements of "Te Dejo Madrid")
7. "Back in Black" (AC/DC cover)
8. "Rules"
9. "Inevitable"
10. "Underneath Your Clothes"
11. "Estoy Aquí"
12. "Octavo Día"
13. "Ready For The Good Times"
14. "Un Poco de Amor"
15. "Poem to a Horse"
16. "Tú"

Encore

17. "Objection (Tango)" (Afro-Punk Version)
18. "Whenever, Wherever" (Sahara Mix)
Hispanophone
1. "Ojos Así"
2. "Si Te Vas"
3. "Ciega, Sordomuda"
4. "Inevitable"
5. "Dude (Looks Like A Lady)" (Aeromsith cover; contains elements of "Te Dejo Madrid")
6. "Back in Black" (AC/DC cover)
7. "Rules"
8. "Underneath Your Clothes"
9. "Estoy Aquí"
10. "Octavo Día"
11. "Ready for the Good Times"
12. "Un Poco de Amor"
13. "Dónde Están los Ladrones?"
14. "Tú"
15. "Te Dejo Madrid"

Encore

16. "Te Aviso, Te Anuncio (Tango)" (Afro-Punk Version)
17. "Suerte"(contains elements of "Whenever, Wherever (Sahara Mix)")

== Tour dates ==
| Date | City | Country | Venue | Attendance | Revenue |
North America
| November 8, 2002 | San Diego | United States | San Diego Sports Arena | 11,764 / 11,764 | $655,400 |
| November 10, 2002 | San Jose | United States | Compaq Center | 14,116 / 14,116 | $754,274 |
| November 12, 2002 | Anaheim | United States | Arrowhead Pond of Anaheim | 10,113 / 12,862 | $710,255 |
| November 13, 2002 | Los Angeles | United States | Staples Center | 15,102 / 15,102 | $1,066,743 |
| November 15, 2002 | El Paso | United States | Don Haskins Center | 16,392 / 16,392 | $1,035,105 |
| November 16, 2002 | El Paso | United States | Don Haskins Center | 16,392 / 16,392 | $1,035,105 |
| November 18, 2002 | Washington D.C. | United States | MCI Center | —N/a | —N/a |
| November 20, 2002 | New York City | United States | Madison Square Garden | 14,249 / 14,249 | $1,024,460 |
| November 22, 2002 | Auburn Hills | United States | The Palace of Auburn Hills | 6,553 / 7,425 | $245,480 |
| November 24, 2002 | Philadelphia | United States | First Union Center | 9,842 / 10,549 | $450,560 |
| November 25, 2002 | Uniondale | United States | Nassau Coliseum | 9,131 / 11,854 | $459,487 |
| November 27, 2002 | Montreal | Canada | Bell Centre | 11,140 / 11,140 | $466,243 |
| November 28, 2002 | Toronto | Canada | Air Canada Centre | 10,432 / 11,155 | $429,860 |
| November 30, 2002 | Boston | United States | FleetCenter | 12,555 / 12,555 | $678,540 |
| December 2, 2002 | Miami | United States | American Airlines Arena | 13,958 / 13,958 | $886,053 |
Europe
| December 10, 2002 | Barcelona | Spain | Palau Sant Jordi | 18,000 / 18,000 | $696,279 |
| December 12, 2002 | Cologne | Germany | Kölnarena | 14,405 / 14,800 | $756,335 |
| December 16, 2002 | London | England | Wembley Arena | —N/a | —N/a |
North America
| January 18, 2003 | Chicago | United States | United Center | 14,770 / 14,770 | $934,719 |
| January 20, 2003 | Dallas | United States | American Airlines Center | 13,550 / 13,550 | $727,205 |
| January 22, 2003 | Houston | United States | Compaq Center | 12,735 / 12,735 | $702,205 |
| January 23, 2003 | San Antonio | United States | SBC Center | 12,695 / 12,695 | $709,575 |
| January 25, 2003 | Las Vegas | United States | Mandalay Bay Events Center | 9,347 / 9,347 | $731,125 |
| January 28, 2003 | Denver | United States | Pepsi Center | —N/a | —N/a |
| January 31, 2003 | Phoenix | United States | America West Arena | —N/a | —N/a |
| February 2, 2003 | Oakland | United States | The Arena in Oakland | 10,557 / 12,032 | $636,689 |
| February 5, 2003 | Laredo | United States | Laredo Entertainment Center | —N/a | —N/a |
| February 6, 2003 | Laredo | United States | Laredo Entertainment Center | —N/a | —N/a |
| February 9, 2003 | Guadalajara | Mexico | Estadio Tres de Marzo | 23,926 / 23,926 | $1,112,680 |
| February 11, 2003 | Monterrey | Mexico | Auditorio Coca-Cola | 35,822 / 35,822 | $1,184,826 |
| February 12, 2003 | Monterrey | Mexico | Auditorio Coca-Cola | 35,822 / 35,822 | $1,184,826 |
| February 14, 2003 | Mexico City | Mexico | Foro Sol | 88,163 / 88,163 (100%) | $4,050,889 |
| February 15, 2003 | Mexico City | Mexico | Foro Sol | 88,163 / 88,163 (100%) | $4,050,889 |
| February 19, 2003 | Panama City | Panama | Figali Convention Center | —N/a | —N/a |
| February 23, 2003 | Albuquerque | United States | Tingley Coliseum | —N/a | —N/a |
| February 25, 2003 | El Paso | United States | Don Haskins Center | 6,995 / 6,995 | $386,925 |
Latin America
| February 28, 2003 | Quito | Ecuador | Estadio Olímpico Atahualpa | —N/a | —N/a |
| March 5, 2003 | Lima | Peru | Jockey Club Parcela H | —N/a | —N/a |
| March 8, 2003 | Santiago | Chile | Estadio Nacional de Chile | —N/a | —N/a |
| March 12, 2003 | Bogotá | Colombia | Estadio el Campín | —N/a | —N/a |
| March 15, 2003 | Barranquilla | Colombia | Estadio Metropolitano | —N/a | —N/a |
| March 22, 2003 | San Juan | Puerto Rico | Hiram Bithorn Stadium | —N/a | —N/a |
| March 23, 2003 | San Juan | Puerto Rico | Hiram Bithorn Stadium | —N/a | —N/a |
Europe
| March 28, 2003 | Paris | France | Palais omnisports de Paris-Bercy | —N/a | —N/a |
| March 30, 2003 | Vienna | Austria | Wiener Stadthalle | —N/a | —N/a |
| March 31, 2003 | Vienna | Austria | Wiener Stadthalle | —N/a | —N/a |
| April 2, 2003 | Zürich | Switzerland | Hallenstadion | —N/a | —N/a |
| April 4, 2003 | Frankfurt | Germany | Festhalle Frankfurt | —N/a | —N/a |
| April 6, 2003 | Munich | Germany | Olympiahalle | —N/a | —N/a |
| April 10, 2003 | Stockholm | Sweden | Stockholm Globe Arena | —N/a | —N/a |
| April 13, 2003 | Berlin | Germany | Max-Schmeling-Halle | —N/a | —N/a |
| April 14, 2003 | Hamburg | Germany | Color Line Arena | —N/a | —N/a |
| April 17, 2003 | Milan | Italy | Fila Forum | —N/a | —N/a |
| April 21, 2003 | Antwerp | Belgium | Sportpaleis | —N/a | —N/a |
| April 22, 2003 | Rotterdam | Netherlands | Sportpaleis van Ahoy | 10,621 / 10,621 | $483,586 |
| April 25, 2003 | Madrid | Spain | Las Ventas | 17,150 / 17,150 | $746,519 |
| April 27, 2003 | Lisbon | Portugal | Pavilhão Atlântico | —N/a | —N/a |
Latin America
| May 1, 2003 | Punta del Este | Uruguay | Conrad de Punta del Este | —N/a | —N/a |
| May 3, 2003 | Buenos Aires | Argentina | River Plate Stadium | —N/a | —N/a |
| May 6, 2003 | Santo Domingo | Dominican Republic | Estadio Quisqueya | —N/a | —N/a |
| May 8, 2003 | Maracaibo | Venezuela | Estadio José Pachencho Romero | —N/a | —N/a |
| May 11, 2003 | Caracas | Venezuela | Poliedro de Caracas | —N/a | —N/a |
| TOTAL | | | | 350,455 / 357,357 (98%) | $18,039,079 |

== Cancelled shows ==
| Year | City | Country | Venue |
|---|---|---|---|
| 2003 | Beiteddine | Lebanon | Beiteddine Palace |
| 2003 | Beirut | Lebanon | Camille Chamoun Sports City Stadium |

== Personnel ==
- Shakira – Producer, songwriter, vocals, guitar, harmonica
- Gonzalo Agulla – Executive producer
- José Arnal – Executive producer
- Tim Mitchell – Producer, arranger, guitar
- Dana Austin – Producer
- Bettina Abascal – Post producer
- Dominic Morley – Engineer
- Richard Robson – Engineer
- Neil Tucker – Engineer
- Matt Vaughan – Engineer
- Richard Wilkinson – Engineer
- Adrian Hall – Mixing engineer
- Chris Theis – Mixing engineer
- Mike Fisher – Audio post-production
- Mike Wilder – Mastering
- Ramiro Aguilar – Video director
- Pablo Arraya – Editing assistant
- Rita Quintero – Backing vocals, keyboards
- Adam Zimmon – Guitar
- Mario Inchaust – Backing vocals, Guitars
- Albert Sterling Menendez – Keyboards
- Pedro Alfonso – Violin
- Dan Rothchild – Bass guitar, photography
- Brendan Buckley – Drums
- Rafael Padilla – Percussion
- Jeff Bender – Photography, cover photo
- Frank Ockenfels – Photography
- Ian Cuttler – Art direction
- Frank Carbonari – Graphic design
- Rose Noone – A&R
