= Objection (Tango) =

2002 single by Shakira

Single by Shakira

from the album Laundry Service
- B-side: "Te Aviso, Te Anuncio (Tango)"
- Released: 24 June 2002
- Studio: The Hit Factory, Crescent Moon (Miami, Florida); Compass Point (Nassau, Bahamas)
- Genre: Pop rock; tango; surf rock; new wave
- Length: 3:42 (album version); 3:29 (radio edit)
- Label: Epic
- Songwriter: Shakira
- Producer: Shakira

Shakira singles chronology
"Underneath Your Clothes" (2002)	"Objection (Tango)" (2002)	"Que Me Quedes Tú" (2002)

Music videos
- "Objection (Tango)" on YouTube; "Te Aviso, Te Anuncio (Tango)" on YouTube

"Objection (Tango)" is a song by Colombian singer-songwriter Shakira for her fifth studio album and first English-language album Laundry Service (2001). It was the first song Shakira wrote in English after being encouraged by American singer Gloria Estefan to record material in the language. "Objection (Tango)" musically combines elements of pop rock and tango, and contains instrumentation from the bandoneón and guitar. Through the lyrics of the song, Shakira aims to end a love triangle she is a part of. The song was released as the fourth single from the album on 24 June 2002. A Spanish version of the song, entitled "Te Aviso, Te Anuncio (Tango)" ("I'm Warning You, I'm Telling You"), was also recorded.

Upon its release, "Objection (Tango)" received generally favourable reviews from music critics, some of whom found it similar to the work of American new wave band the B-52's. Commercially, "Objection (Tango)" was a success and peaked inside the top ten of record charts of various countries such as Australia, Belgium, Italy, Netherlands and France. The song became the last single from the album to chart in the United Kingdom and on the Billboard Hot 100 chart in the United States, reaching numbers 17 and 55, respectively. "Te Aviso, Te Anuncio (Tango)" charted inside the top ten of the US Billboard Latin Pop Airplay and Latin Tropical/Salsa Airplay charts. "Objection (Tango)" was certified platinum and gold in Australia and France by the Australian Recording Industry Association (ARIA) and Syndicat National de l'Édition Phonographique (SNEP), respectively.

An accompanying music video for "Objection (Tango)" was directed by Dave Meyers and features Shakira fighting her unfaithful lover and his mistress in a club. A segment of the video is rendered in an animated cartoon-form. For additional promotion, Shakira performed an Afro-punk and Reggae inspired version of the song at the 2002 MTV Video Music Awards. It was also included in the setlist of the Tour of the Mongoose (2002-2003), which was launched to promote Laundry Service, and Las Mujeres Ya No Lloran World Tour (2025). "Objection (Tango)" was also used in a Pepsi commercial featuring Shakira.

== Background ==
In 1998, Shakira released her second major label studio album Dónde Están los Ladrones? (Where Are the Thieves?), which became an immense success in Latin America and received multi-platinum record certifications in various countries like Argentina, Colombia, Chile, Mexico and Spain. The rock en Español-influenced Latin pop album drew comparisons to the work of Canadian-American singer songwriter Alanis Morissette and "cracked the lucrative US market wide open", spending a total of 11 weeks atop the Billboard Top Latin Albums chart. It became Shakira's first album to receive a platinum certification from the Recording Industry Association of America (RIAA). Dónde Están los Ladrones? spawned the Arabian-styled single "Ojos Así" ("Eyes Like Yours"), which became a hit and was deemed the "signature track" of the album.

American singer Gloria Estefan, whose husband Emilio Estefan was managing Shakira at that time, felt that Shakira had the potential to crossover into the mainstream pop industry. However, Shakira was initially hesitant to record songs in English as it was not her first language, so Estefan offered to translate "Ojos Así" into English in order to show her that "it could translate well." Shakira then began translating the song herself and showed it to Estefan, who responded "Quite honestly, I can't do this better!." As Shakira wanted to have full control over her recordings, she decided to learn English better to enable her to write her own songs. Wanting to "find a way to express my ideas and my feelings, my day-to-day stories in English", Shakira bought rhyming dictionaries, started analysing the lyrics of songs by Bob Dylan, reading poetry and the work of authors like Leonard Cohen and Walt Whitman and took English lessons from a private tutor. "Objection (Tango)" became the first song Shakira wrote in English and in an interview with Faze, she talked about the writing process of the song, saying "I prayed and asked God to send me a good song today, and I remember I started writing the song ['Objection (Tango)'] a couple of hours after. I wrote the music and lyrics at the same time, and when that happens it's really magical to me." Shakira also wrote and recorded a Spanish-version of the song entitled "Te Aviso, Te Anuncio (Tango)".

"Objection (Tango)" was released as the third single from Laundry Service in a promotional CD single format on 6 July 2002. It was later released on 27 August as a CD single featuring the previous single from the album "Underneath Your Clothes" as the B-side.

== Composition ==
"Objection (Tango)" (2002)
Shakira delivers rap-like vocals during the bridge of the song, which was often cited as its highlight.

"Objection (Tango)" was written and produced by Shakira, with additional production by Lester Mendez. It is a combination of pop rock and tango, a style of fast-paced ballroom dance music that originated in Argentina and Uruguay. According to the sheet music of "Objection (Tango)" published at MusicNotes.com by Sony/ATV Music Publishing, it is written in the key of B minor and has a half note metronome of 66 beats per minute. Shakira's vocal range spans from E_{3} to B_{4}. The song contains instrumentation from the bandoneón, which is played at a "breakneck speed," and also features a "twanging" guitar solo. Lyrically, "Objection (Tango)" is dramatic and humorous in approach and focuses on an angered Shakira ordering her love interest to choose between her and his other leading lady; it was said to be a feminist anthem and a "hell-hath-no-fury it's-her-or-me steam train". It contains a line in which Shakira asserts to her lover that "Next to her cheap silicone I look minimal/ That's why in front of your eyes I'm invisible/ But you gotta know small things also count," which a critic commented was a "brave statement in these days of suspiciously ripe teenybop flesh peddlers." During the bridge of the song, Shakira delivers rap-like vocals and instructs her lover to end the love triangle, declaring that "Tango is not for three, was never meant to be."

== Critical reception ==
Alex Henderson from AllMusic selected the song as one of the highlights from Laundry Service and commented that "[Shakira] successfully combines pop/rock with [...] tango on 'Objection (Tango)'." Chuck Taylor from Billboard gave it a very positive review, praising Shakira's vocal delivery, the spoken bridge, and its radio-friendly sound, saying that it is "perfectly timed for the singalong days of summer and adds fuel to the bonfire that this amiable talent [Shakira] has ignited." The critic compared "Objection (Tango)" to Puerto Rican singer Ricky Martin's song "Livin' la Vida Loca", and the work of American new wave band the B-52's. Alexis Petridis from The Guardian picked "Objection (Tango)" as an example of Shakira's unusual style of production and opined that it "sounds like the B-52's jamming with a wedding reception combo [sic]." Matt Cibula from PopMatters complimented Shakira's songwriting and termed the song a "fine rockcraft with drama and a sense of humor." The critic too enjoyed the bridge of the song, saying "the little growly semi-rap break at the end is fun as hell." Lisa Oliver from Yahoo! Music, however, felt the song was on the "mingers side" of the album.

At the 18th Annual International Dance Music Awards ceremony in 2003, "Objection (Tango)" was nominated for Best Latin Dance Track, but lost to Mexican singer Thalía's song "Dance Dance (The Mexican)". Shakira and Mendez won a BMI Latin Award in 2003 for their work on "Te Aviso, Te Anuncio (Tango)", the Spanish-language version of the song. "Te Aviso, Te Anuncio (Tango)" was also nominated for Best Rock Song at the 2003 Latin Grammy Awards, but lost to Colombian musician Juanes's song "Mala Gente".

== Commercial performance ==
Although it was not a commercial success as big as the previous singles from the album, "Whenever, Wherever" and "Underneath Your Clothes", "Objection (Tango)" performed well on record charts nevertheless. In the Dutch-speaking Flanders region of Belgium, it became Shakira's third consecutive top ten hit after it peaked at number nine on the Ultratop chart. Similarly, it became her third consecutive top ten in the French-speaking Wallonia region of the country after it peaked at number eight. "Objection (Tango)" debuted at number 31 on the French Singles Chart and peaked at number ten for two weeks. It charted for a total of 24 weeks and was certified gold by the Syndicat National de l'Édition Phonographique (SNEP) for sales of 250,000 units. In Hungary, the song topped the national airplay chart. It appeared on the chart for a total of 54 weeks and thus became Shakira's longest charting song in the country. After debuting at number 11 on the Italian Singles Chart, "Objection (Tango)" peaked at number six and charted for a total of 17 weeks. In Netherlands, the song entered the Dutch Top 40 chart at a low chart position of 48 but leaped to number 12 the following week. It later peaked at number five and spent a total of 20 weeks on the chart. "Objection (Tango)" debuted at number ten on the Norwegian Singles Chart and peaked at number eight two weeks later. The International Federation of the Phonographic Industry Norway (IFPI Norway) certified it gold for sales of 5,000 units. In Sweden, the song made a high entry on the Sverigetopplistan chart at number nine and peaked at number seven. It lasted for a total of 17 weeks on the chart. "Objection (Tango)" became the last single from the album to chart in the United Kingdom, where it peaked at number 17 on the UK Singles Chart. It also became Shakira's first single to miss charting inside the top ten in the country.

"Objection (Tango)" became a hit in Australia, where it debuted and peaked at number two on the ARIA Singles Chart for three weeks. It was kept from attaining the top position by Canadian singer Avril Lavigne's song "Complicated" and later by German techno band Scooter's "The Logical Song". Its total stay on the chart lasted for 18 weeks. "Objection (Tango)" was certified platinum by the Australian Recording Industry Association (ARIA) for shipments of 70,000 units. It became the third consecutive single from the album to attain platinum status in the country. The single also performed well in New Zealand and peaked at number eight on the RIANZ singles chart.

The song performed moderately well in the United States. It became the last single from Laundry Service to appear on the Billboard Hot 100 chart on which it peaked at number 55. The song also peaked at numbers 21 and 25 on the Top 40 Mainstream and Hot Dance Club Songs charts, respectively. "Te Aviso, Te Anuncio (Tango)" charted on the Latin record charts, peaking at number 16 on the Hot Latin Songs chart. It performed better on the Latin Pop Airplay and Latin Tropical/Salsa Airplay charts, reaching numbers seven and ten, respectively.

== Music video ==
The accompanying music video for "Objection (Tango)" was filmed in Los Angeles, California on 20–21 May 2002. Directed by Dave Meyers and choreographed by Tina Landon, the video begins with Shakira and her love interest doing tango in a bar-like setting, starting with a low paced routine. Earlier on, Shakira decides to leave him but gets pulled back as their dancing continues. Later, the tango becomes faster and more intricate as the opening beat of the song kicks in. Shakira's love interest exits the bar abruptly, leaving her alone to dance to the song. She follows her love interest in a yellow car and arrives at a club where she sees him with another woman, played by Hawaiian actress Tabitha Taylor. An animated cartoon-styled sequence follows as Shakira jumps over the crowd and fights her unfaithful lover and Taylor. While wrestling the latter, Shakira pokes holes in both implants of the villainess's huge bosom with her sharp fingernails and her big breasts gushes out air from the holes in her breasts and is shown to deflate and reduce in size as the line "Next to her cheap silicone I look minimal" plays. As she grabs her deflating bosom in terror as her bosom deflates and shrinks. After the buxom villainess is deflated and defeated Shakira defeats the man, the animated sequence ends and the fight is shown to happen only in Shakira's imagination. When she tries to fight the man and Taylor in reality, she is quickly defeated and crashes into a glass table. Two men resembling comical superheroes, one of whom is played by Dan Southworth, appear to her aid and quickly defeat the man, while Shakira defeats Taylor. The two are shown gagged up in the boot of Shakira's car and are then tied up on spinning discs in an industrial engine room while Shakira performs with a band. The discs spin faster and faster until they come off and are sent flying off at a high speed. Scenes of Shakira dancing at the bar and performing the song with a band are interspersed throughout the video. The music video reached number one on the Total Request Live chart.

== Live performances and usage in media ==
On 29 August 2002, Shakira performed "Objection (Tango)" at the 2002 MTV Video Music Awards in New York City. Instead of tango, the performance of the song was inspired by samba and featured a large number of percussionists on the stage. Shakira incorporated belly dancing moves in her choreography and near to the end of the performance, she fell backward into the crowd and "was delivered back to the stage quickly enough not to miss a single line." Jon Wiederhorn from MTV praised Shakira's stage presence and called her belly dancing routine "seductive." "Objection (Tango)" was included in the setlist of Tour of the Mongoose, Shakira's first worldwide tour that was launched in support of Laundry Service. Similar to the MTV Video Music Awards, a samba-oriented version of the song was performed and it was the final performance before the encore segment. The performance boasted instrumentation from numerous bongo drums. Corey Moss from MTV opined that it "featured Shakira's best belly dancing yet" and "had the audience screaming for an encore." Steve Baltin from Rolling Stone selected the performance of the song as one of the highlights of the show, saying "surrounding herself with bongo drums during "Objection (Tango)" [...] she embodied all the glitz and glamour of good old-fashioned rock & roll." At the 2011 Latin Grammy Awards ceremony, Spanish music duo Estopa performed a live cover of the song in rumba as part of the Latin Grammys tribute to Shakira, where she was honored Latin Recording Academy Person of the Year. Shakira also performed the Afro-Punk version at the 2023 MTV Video Music Awards and included the song in the setlist of Las Mujeres Ya No Lloran World Tour (2025).

As part of her global sponsorship and advertising agreement with American multinational food and beverage corporation PepsiCo to promote their carbonated soft drink Pepsi, Shakira starred in a television commercial for the brand's "Dare For More" campaign. The commercial was released in 2004 and shows Shakira dancing to "Objection (Tango)" with a clerk in a convenience store.

== Track listings ==
- CD single
1. "Objection (Tango)" (Radio Edit) – 3:29
2. "Objection (Tango)" (Album version) – 3:42
- 12-inch maxi single
1. "Objection (Tango)" (Album version) – 3:42
2. "Objection (Tango)" (Jellybean's Funhouse Mix) - 7:55
3. "Te Aviso, Te Anuncio (tango)" (Gigi D'Agostino Psico remix) - 10:53
- Maxi single
1. "Objection (Tango)" (Radio Edit) – 3:29
2. "Objection (Tango)" (Album version) – 3:42
3. "Objection (Tango)" (Kupper's Deep Future Radio Edit) - 4:26
4. "Te Aviso, Te Anuncio (tango)" (Gigi D'Agostino Psico remix) - 6:10
5. "Objection (Tango)" (Music video) - 3:42

== Charts ==
=== "Objection (Tango)" ===
==== Weekly charts ====
2002–2003 weekly chart performance for "Objection (Tango)"
Chart (2002–2003)	Peak position
Australia (ARIA)	2
Austria (Ö3 Austria Top 40)	12
Belgium (Ultratop 50 Flanders)	9
Belgium (Ultratop 50 Wallonia)	8
Croatia International Airplay (HRT)	4
Denmark (Tracklisten)	20
Europe (Eurochart Hot 100)	13
Finland (Suomen virallinen lista)	10
France (SNEP)	10
Germany (GfK)	19
Greece (IFPI)	8
Hungary (Rádiós Top 40)	1
Hungary (Single Top 40)	16
Ireland (IRMA)	12
Italy (FIMI)	6
Netherlands (Dutch Top 40)	4
Netherlands (Single Top 100)	5
New Zealand (Recorded Music NZ)	8
Norway (VG-lista)	8
Poland (Polish Airplay Charts)	6
Portugal (AFP)	7
Romania (Romanian Top 100)	1
Scottish Singles Sales (Official Charts)	11
Sweden (Sverigetopplistan)	7
Switzerland (Schweizer Hitparade)	10
UK Singles (Official Charts)	17
US Billboard Hot 100	55
US Dance Club Songs (Billboard)	25
US Pop Airplay (Billboard)	21

==== Year-end charts ====
2002 year-end performance for "Objection (Tango)"
Chart (2002)	Position
Australia (ARIA)	41
Belgium (Ultratop 50 Flanders)	97
Netherlands (Dutch Top 40)	71
Netherlands (Single Top 100)	64
New Zealand (RIANZ)	49
Spain (AFYVE)	18
Sweden (Hitlistan)	69

2003 year-end performance for "Objection (Tango)"
Chart (2003)	Position
Belgium (Ultratop 50 Wallonia)	58
France (SNEP)	43
Italy (FIMI)	36
Romania (Romanian Top 100)	56
Switzerland (Schweizer Hitparade)	86

=== "Te Aviso, Te Anucio (Tango)" ===
2002–2003 weekly performance for "Te Aviso, Te Anucio (Tango)"
Chart (2002–2003)	Peak position
US Hot Latin Songs (Billboard)	16
US Latin Pop Airplay (Billboard)	7
US Tropical Airplay (Billboard)	10
Venezuela (Notimex)	4

2020 weekly performance for "Te Aviso, Te Anucio (Tango)"
Chart (2020)	Peak position
US Latin Digital Songs (Billboard) "Te Aviso, Te Anuncio (Tango)"	12

== Certifications ==
=== "Objection (Tango)" ===
Certifications and sales for "Objection (Tango)"
Region	Certification	Certified units/sales
Australia (ARIA)	Platinum	70,000^{^}
France (SNEP)	Gold	250,000^{*}
Mexico (AMPROFON)	Gold	30,000^{‡}
Norway (IFPI Norway)	Gold	
United Kingdom	—	80,000
^{*} Sales figures based on certification alone.^{^} Shipments figures based on certification alone.^{‡} Sales+streaming figures based on certification alone.

=== "Te Aviso, Te Anucio (Tango)" ===
Certifications and sales for "Te Aviso, Te Anucio (Tango)"
Region	Certification	Certified units/sales
Mexico (AMPROFON)	2× Platinum+Gold	150,000^{‡}
^{‡} Sales+streaming figures based on certification alone.

== Release history ==
Release dates and formats for "Objection (Tango)"
Region	Date	Format(s)	Label(s)	Ref.
United States	24 June 2002	Contemporary hit radio	Epic	
Australia	2 September 2002	CD	Sony Music	
Denmark	28 October 2002	CD	Sony Music	
France	4 November 2002	Maxi CD	Sony Music	
United Kingdom	11 November 2002	CD	RCA	
Belgium	27 November 2002	12-inch vinyl	Dancity	

== See also ==
- List of Romanian Top 100 number ones of the 2000s
