= Ojos Así =

1999 single by Shakira

Single by Shakira

from the album ¿Dónde Están los Ladrones?
- Language: Spanish; Arabic
- Released: 23 July 1999
- Studio: Crescent Moon Studios, Miami, Florida
- Genre: Dance-pop • Worldbeat • Arabic music
- Length: 3:57
- Label: Sony Colombia
- Composers: Shakira; Pablo Flores; Javier Garza
- Lyricist: Shakira
- Producers: Shakira; Pablo Flores; Javier Garza

Shakira singles chronology
"No Creo" (1999)	"Ojos Así" (1999)	"Moscas en la Casa" (1999)

Music video
- "Ojos Así" on YouTube

Audio video
- "Eyes Like Yours" (English version) on YouTube

"Ojos Así" (transl. "Eyes Like That") is a song by Colombian singer Shakira from her fourth studio album, Dónde Están los Ladrones? (1998). Infused with nuances of Arabic pop, the lyrics tell of the singer traveling the world but not having seen eyes like her lover's. It was released as the album's fifth single in July 1999 by Sony Music Colombia. It was written by Shakira, composed and produced by her, Pablo Flores, and Javier Garza. The song was later adapted into English by Gloria Estefan as "Eyes Like Yours" and included on her first English studio album Laundry Service (2001).

Music critics praised "Ojos Así" as one of the album's best tracks. "Eyes Like Yours", however, was met with a less favorable reception, with reviewers commenting that it paled compared to the original. At the inaugural Latin Grammy Awards in 2000, "Ojos Así" won Best Female Pop Vocal Performance and received a Broadcast Music, Inc. (BMI) Latin Award in 2002.

An accompanying music video that depicts Shakira performing the song in front of a crowd and belly dancing was nominated in the category of Latin Grammy Award for Best Short Form Music Video in 2000. The song was included in the set list for the Tour Anfibio (2000), Tour of the Mongoose (2002–03), The Sun Comes Out World Tour (2010–11) and Las Mujeres Ya No Lloran World Tour (2025–26). Shakira also performed an acoustic version of the song for her first live album, MTV Unplugged (2000). It ranked on several charts in Europe and was a top-ten hit on the Billboard Latin Pop Airplay chart in the United States.

== Background and composition ==
"Ojos Así"
A sample of "Ojos Así", which incorporates a "Lambadalike middle eastern rhythm".

After rising to prominence with the success of her major-label debut album Pies Descalzos (1995), Shakira was introduced to Emilio Estefan, then the most important producer in the Hispanic market, by her promoter and longtime friend, Jairo Martínez. Estefan was renowned for launching the careers of several Hispanic singers, including Thalía and his wife Gloria Estefan. He decided to work with Shakira as he identified her potential to break into the US Latin market, though one of Shakira's concerns about working with him was creative control over her music. Before signing their contract, the roles and duties were finalized: Estefan would be her manager and executive producer, but she would be in charge of all material and arrangements and have final approval over her records. She later stated about Estefan, "He had a great respect for me as an artist and trusted me totally on this project." They started working on Estefan's Crescent Moon Studios in Miami, Florida. She insisted on perfection, working on the material to the point of exhaustion. "I made two or three demos of each song. I became a human being so demanding of myself that until the song made my hair stand on end, I wouldn't stop".

Equipment for the recording of her subsequent album Dónde Están los Ladrones? included old amplifiers to achieve a better sound, a 40-year-old German microphone, and several innovations in the instrumental mixes. The album took nine months to produce, longer than Shakira's previous records since more people were involved. Shakira commented, "To me it's a normal time, the gestation period for a baby. But many people wag their finger and tell me that the next one cannot take so long..." Shakira was involved with the compositions for all the tracks in the album, including "Ojos Así". "Ojos Así" was written by Shakira and composed and produced by her along with Pablo Flores and Javier Garza. Infused with nuances of Arabic pop, the song characterizes Shakira as a globetrotter jaded by life's experiences whose soul is revitalized by the amorous gaze of her crush. The singer bemoans that, despite having traversed the distance from Beirut to Bahrain, she has yet to encounter "eyes like yours". The track is sung mostly in Spanish, a few verses in Arabic, and has a backing chorus performing in the latter language.

The success of Dónde Están los Ladrones? prompted Gloria Estefan to persuade Shakira to record the album in English and attempt to cross over into the mainstream pop industry. However, she was initially hesitant to record songs in English as it was not her first language, so Estefan offered to translate "Ojos Así" into English in order to show her that "it could translate well". Shakira then began translating the song herself and showed it to Gloria Estefan, and would say, "Quite honestly, I can't do this better!" As Shakira wanted to have full control over her recordings, she decided to learn English better to enable her to write her own songs. She was supposed to return to the studio to record an English-language version of the album in January 1999. It did not come to fruition, and a new album titled Laundry Service was released instead as her first crossover album. Despite the cancellation of the project, the English-language version of "Ojos Así" still appeared on Laundry Service as "Eyes Like Yours".

== Promotion ==
"Ojos Así" was released to radio stations worldwide by Sony Discos as the album's fifth single in October 1999. It was later included on her greatest hits album Grandes Éxitos (2002). Its music video was directed by Mark Kohr and filmed in Los Angeles. The film depicts Shakira interspersed with her belly dancing and performing in front of a dancing and jubilant crowd. At the inaugural Latin Grammy Awards in 2000, it was nominated in the category of Latin Grammy Award for Best Short Form Music Video, which went to "No Me Dejes de Querer" by Gloria Estefan. The video won the International Viewer's Choice Award (North) at the 2000 MTV Video Music Awards, and was also nominated for the same award in the South category, losing to "La Vida" by Los Fabulosos Cadillacs.

== Live performances ==
"Ojos Así" was included on the set list for the following tours: Tour Anfibio (2000), Tour of the Mongoose (2002–03), the Oral Fixation Tour (2006–07), and The Sun Comes Out World Tour (2010–11), In August 1999, Shakira sang an acoustic version of "Ojos Así" during an episode of MTV Unplugged in New York City. The performance was included on her first live album, MTV Unplugged (2000). She also performed "Ojos Así" at the 2000 Latin Grammy Awards. During a specific rendition of "Ojos Asi" in San Diego in 2003, Shakira commenced her concert with this song, eliciting exultation from the audience as she belly-danced in sync with the tune. She sang it during the Rock in Rio festivals in Portugal in 2006, Spain in 2007 and Rio de Janeiro in 2011. It was also performed at the 2010 Glastonbury Festival and the Super Bowl LIV halftime show in 2020. Shakira performed the song during the 67th Annual Grammy Awards on February 2, 2025. In May 2026 Shakira performed the song at the brazilian annual musical project Todo Mundo no Rio which attracted 2 million people.

== Reception ==
AllMusic reviewer Alex Henderson compared Shakira to Alanis Morissette and stated, "it would be hard to imagine her coming up with something as poetic as the Middle Eastern fantasy that Shakira vividly describes on her Arabic-influenced mega-hit 'Ojos Así'". John Lannert of Billboard called "Ojos Así" the album's "most satisfying track". The Hispanic magazine editor Mark Holston felt that the song "evokes the singer's Middle Eastern roots on a performance that effectively blends World Beat rhythms with Shakira's earthy vocals". Writing for The Modesto Bee, Steve Morse elucidated how Shakira, through her song "Ojos Asi", did not forsake her Middle Eastern heritage, as evidenced by the presence of distinct Arab musical elements in the piece. The Los Angeles Times reviewer Ernesto Lechner called it "superb".

Critics were less favorable towards the English version. While calling the translation an "admirable" attempt, the Democrat and Chronicle writer Ramiro Burr commented that it "doesn't have the fire and snap of the original". In a scathing review of the album, Arturo Garcia from The Wichita Eagle criticized it as "nothing less than a perversion of the original". Writing for the Knight Ridder, Elio Leturia felt that while the track is "[v]ibrant and highly romantic, it loses its richness of its Spanish counterpart". The Sacramento Bee reviewers Chris Macias and Bruce Dancis described the song as a "clunky trip to the nightclubs of Kashmir".

At the inaugural Latin Grammy Awards in 2000, "Ojos Así" won Best Female Pop Vocal Performance. It won an award at the 2002 BMI Latin Awards. In 2022, it was listed as one of the 200 greatest dance songs of all time by Rolling Stone.

Commercially, "Ojos Así" ranked in several European charts including Belgium (in both Flanders and Wallonia), France, the Netherlands, and Switzerland. In the United States, the track peaked at number 22 and 9 on the Billboard Hot Latin Songs and Latin Pop Airplay charts.

== Credits and personnel ==
Credits are adapted from the liner notes of Dónde Están los Ladrones?.

- Shakira – lead vocals, composer, lyricist
- Fadi Hardan – background vocals
- Nicolas W. Farhoury – background vocals
- Oussama Karaki – background vocals
- Rita Quintero – background vocals
- Tommy Anthony – background vocals
- Javier Garza – composer, producer, mix engineer, music arranger
- Pablo Flores – composer, producer, arranger
- Gustavo Celis – engineer
- Carlos Paucar – engineer
- Alfred Figueroa – assistant engineer
- Simon Ramone – assistant engineer
- Steve Menezes – assistant engineer
- Jorge Gonzalez – assistant engineer
- Adam Zimmon – guitar
- Joe Zeytoonian – percussion, oud
- Michelle Massad – oud
- Myriam Eli – percussion
- Jack Stamates – violon
- Fadi Jardan – accordion

== Track listings ==
European Maxi CD

1. "Ojos Así" (album version) – 3:57
2. "Ojos Así" (Thunder Mix Radio Edit) – 3:52
3. "Ojos Así" (Thunder Mix) – 10:15
4. "Ojos Así" (Desert Mix) – 9:31
5. "Ojos Así" (Mirage Mix) – 5:34

Colombian Maxi CD

1. "Ojos Así" (Thunder Mix) – 10:15
2. "Ojos Así" (Thunder Mix Radio Edit) – 3:52
3. "Ojos Así" (Desert Dub) – 9:31
4. "Ojos Así" (Mirage Mix) – 5:34

== Charts ==
=== Weekly charts ===
1999 weekly chart positions for "Ojos Así"
Chart (1999)	Peak position
Honduras (Notimex)	3
Nicaragua (Notimex)	2
US Hot Latin Songs (Billboard)	22
US Latin Pop Airplay (Billboard)	9

2003 weekly chart positions for "Ojos Así"
Chart (2003)	Peak position
Belgium (Ultratop 50 Flanders)	29
Belgium (Ultratop 50 Wallonia)	16
Europe (Eurochart Hot 100)	52
France (SNEP)	15
Netherlands (Dutch Top 40)	27
Netherlands (Single Top 100)	25
Romania (Romanian Top 100)	27
Switzerland (Schweizer Hitparade)	33

=== Year-end charts ===
2000 year-end chart performance for "Ojos Así"
Chart (2000)	Position
Brazil (Crowley)	73

2003 year-end chart performance for "Ojos Así"
Chart (2003)	Position
Belgium (Ultratop 50 Wallonia)	68
France (SNEP)	96

== Certifications ==
Certifications and sales for "Ojos Así"
Region	Certification	Certified units/sales
Brazil (Pro-Música Brasil)	Gold	30,000^{‡}
Mexico (AMPROFON)	Diamond	300,000^{‡}
United States (RIAA)	Gold	500,000^{‡}
^{‡} Sales+streaming figures based on certification alone.

== Adaptations ==
The song was adapted in Greek by Natasa Theodoridou with the title "Καταζητείται" (Wanted) in her 2001 album Υπ' ευθύνη μου (I'm in charge). The song was adapted into Malayalam language under the title "O January" for the 2007 movie Big B. Set against the backdrop of New Year celebrations, the track also blends traditional Indian musical elements with its original composition.
