= Julián López Escobar =

Spanish bullfighter

Juli López Escobar
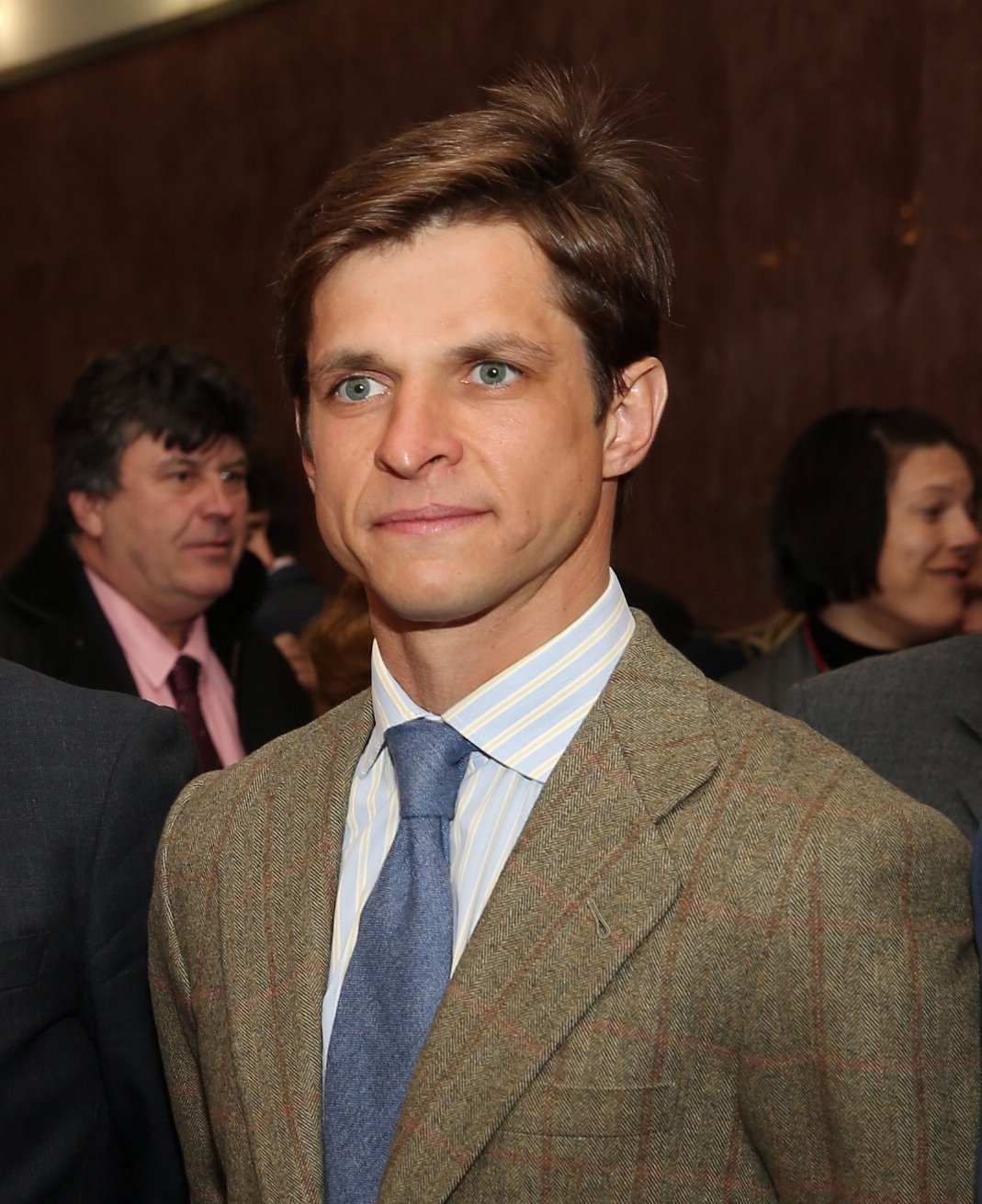
- El Juli in 2015

Personal information
- Nickname: El Juli
- Born: Julián López Escobar; October 3, 1982 (age 43) San Blas, Madrid, Spain

Sport
- Sport: Bullfighting
- Rank: Matador

Julián López Escobar (born October 3, 1982) commonly known as El Juli, is a Spanish bullfighter.

== Biography ==
Julián López Escobar caped his first bull at the young age of nine, and his family enrolled him in the Madrid Academy of Tauromachy. After years of studying, he moved to Mexico to perform in bullfights, as Spain required novilleros (junior matador) to be of at least 16 years of age. On March 16, 1997, at the age of 14, López Escobar made his bullfighting debut in Texcoco, Mexico. He finished with a standing ovation and received two bull's ears. Approximately one year later, on September 18, 1998, López Escobar received his alternativa in Nîmes, France, with José María Manzanares as his "godfather" and Ortega Cano standing as witness. At age 15, he became the youngest professional bullfighter in the history of the sport.

By the age of 17, Julián had become the highest-paid bullfighter in history. Julián often placed his own banderillas (spiked banners), which is typically the job of the banderillero. Additionally, in three out of his 134 performances in 1999, he was the lone matador. During the San Fermin festival in Pamplona, Spain,n in 2010, he was injured and had to be hospitalized after a bull gored him in the thigh, stomach, and scrotum.

== Personal life ==
He married Rosario Domecq Márquez, daughter of Pedro Domecq de la Riva and Rosario Márquez Amilibia, on October 20, 2007, in the chapel of the Convent of Santa Catalina in Santo Domingo de Jerez de la Frontera. On 6 September 2011, they became the parents of twins, a girl named Rosario and a boy named Fernando. On 26 March 2014, they had a daughter, Isabel.

== See also ==
- List of bullfighters
