= Faze (magazine) =

Magazine for young people

- Categories: Teen magazine
- Founded: 2000
- Country: Canada
- Based in: Toronto
- Language: English
- Website: faze.ca
- ISSN: 1706-0745

Faze is a Canadian-based magazine written for teens and young adults, also available in the United States.

Faze began publishing in 2000, founded by Lorraine Zander who remains editor-in-chief. While it covers a broad range of topics. It is mostly read by girls 12–19. Style, real-life stories, humour, health are all big parts of Faze but music typically is the biggest component with recent covers featuring artists such as Megan Deangelis, The Black Eyed Peas, Simple Plan, Avril Lavigne, LIGHTS, Beyoncé, Cody Simpson and many more.

Faze has always aimed to be an intelligent, positive magazine for young people. Teens themselves are highly involved in the editorial process, choosing stories and doing a healthy share of the writing and editing.

Founder and Editor in Chief Lorraine is advising and collaborating with Begin Again the Series. She has been assisting them in media outreach and potential branding partnerships.
