= Javier Garza =

American sound engineer and mixer

Javier Garza is an American sound engineer and mixer from Florida. Garza has done production work on a large number of successful major-label albums since 1990, and has won two Grammy Awards and nine Latin Grammy Awards. Among the artists whose music Garza has mixed are Gloria Estefan, Ricky Martin, Madonna, Thalía, Shakira, Carlos Vives, Marc Anthony, Vic Damone, Jennifer Lopez, Jon Secada, Alejandro Sanz, Jaci Velasquez, Paulina Rubio and Los Claxons

== Grammy Awards ==
All of Garza's credits are for Mix Engineering.
He's currently at the second spot as Most Latin Grammys won by an Engineer or Mixer

- 2000 - Best Traditional Tropical Latin Album: Gloria Estefan, Alma Caribeña
- 2001 - Best Traditional Tropical Latin Album: Carlos Vives, Dejame Entrar
- 2001 - Latin Grammy, Best Engineered Album: Thalía, Arrasando
- 2002 - Latin Grammy, Best Contemporary Tropical Album: Carlos Vives, Fruta Fresca
- 2005 - Latin Grammy, Best Male Pop Performance: Obie Bermúdez, Todo el Año
- 2005 - Latin Grammy, Best Contemporary Tropical Album: Carlos Vives, Rock de Mi Pueblo
- 2006 - Latin Grammy, Best Tropical Regional Mexican Album: A.B. Quintanilla III y los Kumbia Kings, Kumbia Kings Live
- 2007 - Latin Grammy, Best Contemporary Tropical Album: Oscar De Leon, Fuzionando
- 2009 - Latin Grammy, Best Children Album: Various Artists, Pombo Musical
- 2013 - Latin Grammy, Best Contemporary Pop Vocal Album: Alejandro Sanz, La Musica No Se Toca
- 2013 - Latin Grammy, Best Engineered Album: Kany Garcia, Kany Garcia
- 2014 - Latin Grammy, Best Contemporary Tropical Album: Carlos Vives, Mas + Corazon Profundo
