= Oral Fixation, Vol. 1 & 2 =

Box set by Shakira
- Released: 5 December 2006
- Recorded: 2004–2005
- Genres: Latin pop; dance-pop; pop rock
- Languages: Spanish; English; Arabic; French; German; Latin; Hebrew
- Label: Epic

Shakira chronology
Oral Fixation, Vol. 2 (2005)	Oral Fixation, Vol. 1 & 2 (2006)	Oral Fixation Tour (2007)

Oral Fixation, Vol. 1 & 2 is the first box set by Colombian singer-songwriter Shakira, released on 5 December 2006, by Epic Records. Released one year after her sixth and seventh studio albums Fijación Oral, Vol. 1 and Oral Fixation, Vol. 2, it includes both previous albums and an additional DVD with music videos and live performances. After attaining international success with her third studio effort, Laundry Service (2001), Shakira decided to create a two-part follow-up record. She released the two projects 5 months apart to commercial success and critical acclaim, both reaching the top ten on the Billboard 200.

As co-producer, Shakira enlisted Rick Rubin as executive producer, also working with Gustavo Cerati, Lester Mendez, Luis F. Ochoa and Jose "Gocho" Torres. to work alongside newer partners Jerry Duplessis, Wyclef Jean, Tim Mitchell and The Matrix. Musically the album follows in the vein of her earlier works, the album is heavily influenced by Latin pop styles, and additionally incorporates elements of dance-pop, pop rock, and trip hop. The compilation peaked at numbers 13 and 27 on the Billboard Latin Pop Albums and Top Latin Albums charts.

== Background ==
After attaining international success with her fifth studio effort Laundry Service in 2001, Shakira opted to create a Spanish-language project for her follow-up record, her first since her fourth studio album Dónde Están los Ladrones? in 1998. Having co-written nearly sixty tracks for Laundry Service, she put herself "on the mission of selecting [her] favorite ones" to record for Fijación Oral, Vol. 1 and its own successor, the English-language Oral Fixation Vol. 2. While recording the first volume, Shakira worked with previous collaborator Lester Mendez and new partners Gustavo Cerati, Luis F. Ochoa, and Jose "Gocho" Torres. Production of the second volume saw her reunited with Cerati, Mendez, and Ochoa and also joined by newer partners Jerry Duplessis, Wyclef Jean, Tim Mitchell, and The Matrix.

== Artwork ==
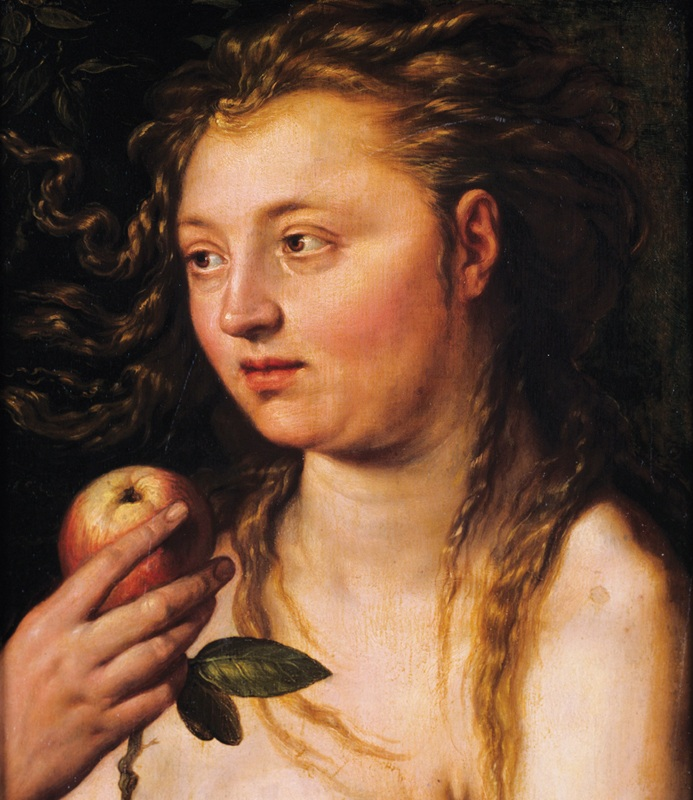
The album's cover was influenced by the biblical figure of Eve (pictured).

For both Oral Fixation records, Shakira commented that the album artworks were inspired by Eve, elaborating that "[she wanted] to attribute to Eve one more reason to bite the forbidden fruit, and that would be her oral fixation" and that "[she always felt] that [she has] been a very oral person. [It is her] biggest source of pleasure". The second volume's cover sees an unclothed Shakira covered by a tree's branches and leaves while holding an apple in her hand. The baby girl she held in her arms on the cover of the first volume is sitting in the tree, alluding to psychoanalyst Sigmund Freud's theory that infants begin discovering the world through their mouths during the oral stage of psychosexual development.

For Jon Pareles of The New York Times, "For obvious reasons, it's eye-catching, as was the cover of the Spanish-language companion album, "Fijación Oral, Vol. 1". In Middle Easts version of the album, Shakira was covered up with leaves. Complex Magazine selected "Oral Fixation" album cover as the eleventh "sexiest album cover of all time", writing that it is "the hottest portrayal of Eve in the Garden of Eden we can imagine." Maxim also listed the album's cover as one of the "sexiest album covers", writing that, "A naked girl holding up an apple in a garden is played out, but not when the girl is hip-shaking Shakira. Damn, it could happen all over again, couldn't it?."

== Music and lyrics ==
=== Volume one ===
Fijación Oral, Vol. 1 is a Latin pop album. The introductory track, "En Tus Pupilas" ("In Your Pupils"), incorporates folk music styles and its opening verse includes French-language lyrics. "La Pared" ("The Wall") has been compared stylistically to the 1980s duo Eurythmics. "La Tortura" ("The Torture") features Spanish singer-songwriter Alejandro Sanz, with elements of Colombian cumbia music, dancehall and electronica. "Obtener un Sí" ("Obtain a Yes") is a bossa nova song with cha-cha elements against an orchestral background. "Día Especial" ("Special Day") features Argentinean singer-songwriter Gustavo Cerati on guitar.

The sixth track, "Escondite Inglés", has a new wave feel. "No" also features Cerati on guitar, using a simple melody to emphasize Shakira's vocals. "Las de la Intuición" ("The Ones with the Intuition") has synthpop elements, while "Día de Enero" ("January Day") has been compared to Mexican singer-songwriter Natalia Lafourcade. "Lo Imprescindible" ("Bare Essentials") has German-language verses in which Shakira lyrically expresses "Come baby come. Don't ever leave me". The disc concludes with an acoustic version of "La Pared" and the Shaketon remix of "La Tortura".

=== Volume two ===
For Stephen Thomas Erlewine of Allmusic, the album touches on everything from the expected Latin rhythms to glitzy Euro disco, trashy American rock & roll, and stomping Britpop, all punctuated by some stark confessionals. "How Do You Do" is a bold opening track that features Gregorian chants and an eerie reciting of "The Lord's Prayer" before thrusting the listener into a song similar to Sarah McLachlan's 'Dear God', according to Kristina Weise of Songwriting Universe. It presents bitter questions regarding faith and religion. The lyrics say, "How many people die and hurt in your name?/Hey does that make you proud, or does it bring you shame?" Shakira affirms, "I decided in the bridge of the song to include chants from different religions like Islam, Judaism and Christianity. And the three chanters are saying basically the same: they are asking for forgiveness," she said off the track. The first single, "Don't Bother", presents the final chapter of a relationship and the confusion that faces anyone in a break up. It includes the lyric lines, "For you I'd give up all I own and move to a communist country/If you came with me, of course/And I'd file my nails so they don't hurt you." She quickly follows with: "And after all I'm glad I am not your type/I promise you won't see me cry/So don't bother/I'll be fine, I'll be fine." For Shakira, "I think 'Don't Bother' has a lot of pain in it as a song, but also a lot of humor and sarcasm. Yes, it is a way of exorcising all of these feelings, a form of catharsis, getting rid of all of those emotions that torture us women at some point in our lives."

"Illegal" features a guitar solo by Mexican guitarist Carlos Santana, and features lyrics such as, "You said you would love me until you died/And as far as I know you're still alive", which were compared to "Alanis Morissette"'s "You Oughta Know", according to Stephen Thomas Erlewine of Allmusic. "I'd like to be the owner of the zipper on your jeans," she sings on the racy "Hey You," which was compared to the works of American rock-band No Doubt, by Slant Magazine. Mariachi horns bump up against surf guitars in "Animal City", a don't-go-there warning against fame and fake friends; while bossa nova accents wind through "Something", one of only two tracks reprised from Fijación Oral, being called En Tus Pupilas on the first edition. While "The Day and the Time" is on the first edition, with the title "Dia Especial". Meanwhile, gypsy-caravan violin and marauder guitar complete "Your Embrace," a teardroppy, adult-contemporary balladry, whilst "Costume Makes the Clown," talks about she cheating on her guy, over battering-ram guitars. Shakira also dives into pulsating neo-disco on the closing track "Timor", but in the form of a protest song.

== Promotion ==
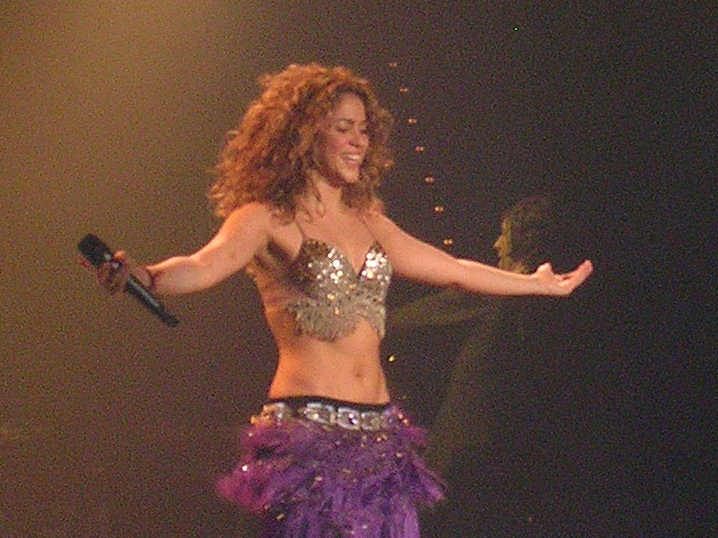
Shakira performing during the Oral Fixation Tour in 2006

To further promote Fijación Oral, Vol. 1 and Oral Fixation, Vol. 2, Shakira embarked on the Oral Fixation Tour. It was launched on 14 June 2006, at the Feria De Muestras in Zaragoza, Spain. With the assistance of the Creative Artists Agency, she visited twenty-seven cities and performed forty-one shows across five continents. The tour concluded on 9 July 2007, at the Turkcell Kuruçeşme Arena in Istanbul, Turkey. It grossed over $42 million in North and Latin America, and grossed $100 million worldwide. The set list primarily consisted of Spanish-language tracks, and additionally included earlier singles from Shakira's albums Pies Descalzos (1996), Dónde Están los Ladrones? (1998), and Laundry Service (2001).

In November 2007, Epic Records released the Oral Fixation Tour live album, filmed during a show in Miami, Florida in December 2006. Robert Silva from About.com provided a positive review, describing the recording as a "very entertaining and lively performance"; he expressed an additional interest in the bonus behind-the-scenes footage. William Ruhlmann from Allmusic shared a similar sentiment, complimenting her vocals and dancing abilities.

== Release ==
On 23 January 2007, Fijación Oral, Vol. 1 and Oral Fixation, Vol. 2 were released as a three-disc box set, titled Oral Fixation, Vol. 1 & 2. Each record was on a separate disc, and was packaged with a DVD featuring music videos and live recordings of album tracks. The compilation peaked at numbers 13 and 27 on the Billboard Latin Pop Albums and Top Latin Albums charts.

== Track listing ==
Credits adapted from the liner notes of Fijación Oral, Vol. 1 and Oral Fixation, Vol. 2.

Disc 1 – Fijación Oral, Vol. 1
No.	Title	Writer(s)	Length
1.	"En Tus Pupilas"	Shakira, Luis Fernando Ochoa	4:24
2.	"La Pared"	Shakira, Lester Mendez	3:20
3.	"La Tortura" (featuring Alejandro Sanz)	Shakira, Ochoa	3:35
4.	"Obtener Un Sí"	Shakira, Mendez	3:21
5.	"Día Especial" (featuring Gustavo Cerati)	Gustavo Cerati, Shakira, Ochoa	4:25
6.	"Escondite Inglés"	Shakira	3:10
7.	"No" (featuring Gustavo Cerati)	Shakira, Mendez	4:47
8.	"Las de la Intuición"	Shakira, Ochoa	3:42
9.	"Día de Enero"	Shakira	2:55
10.	"Lo Imprescindible"	Shakira, Mendez	3:58
11.	"La Pared" (Versión Acústica)	Shakira, Mendez	2:41
12.	"La Tortura" (Shaketon Remix)	Shakira, Ochoa	3:12

Disc 2 – Oral Fixation, Vol. 2
No.	Title	Writer(s)	{{{extra_column}}}	Length
1.	"How Do You Do"	Shakira, Lauren Christy, Scott Spock, Graham Edwards	Shakira	3:45
2.	"Illegal" (featuring Carlos Santana)	Shakira, Lester Mendez	Shakira	3:53
3.	"Hips Don't Lie" (featuring Wyclef Jean)	Wyclef Jean, Shakira, Oscar Arfanno, LaTravia Parker	Shakira	3:38
4.	"Animal City"	Shakira, Luis Fernando Ochoa	Shakira	3:15
5.	"Don't Bother"	Shakira, Christy, Spock, Edwards, Heather Reid, Leisha Hailey	Shakira	4:17
6.	"The Day And The Time" (featuring Gustavo Cerati)	Shakira, Pedro Aznar, Ochoa, Gustavo Cerati	Shakira	4:22
7.	"Dreams For Plans"	Shakira, Brendan Buckley	Shakira	4:02
8.	"Hey You"	Shakira, Tim Mitchell	Shakira	4:09
9.	"Your Embrace"	Shakira, Mitchell	Shakira	3:32
10.	"Costume Makes the Clown"	Shakira, Buckley	Shakira	3:12
11.	"Something"	Shakira, Ochoa	Shakira	4:21
12.	"Timor"	Shakira	Shakira	3:32

American bonus track
No.	Title	Writer(s)	{{{extra_column}}}	Length
13.	"La Tortura" (alternate version)	Shakira, Luis Fernando Ochoa	Shakira	3:32

Latin American and Spanish bonus track
No.	Title	Writer(s)	{{{extra_column}}}	Length
13.	"Hips Don't Lie" (Spanish version)	Wyclef Jean, Shakira, Oscar Arfanno, LaTravia Parker, Jerry Dupless, Pena	Shakira	3:37

European bonus track
No.	Title	Writer(s)	{{{extra_column}}}	Length
13.	"Don't Bother" (Jrsnchz Radio Remix)	Shakira, Lester Mendez	Shakira	4:24

Disc 3 – DVD
No.	Title	Length
1.	"La Tortura" (music video) (featuring Alejandro Sanz)	3:44
2.	"Don't Bother" (Music video)	4:30
3.	"No" (music video) (featuring Gustavo Cerati)	4:47
4.	"Hips Don't Lie" (music video) (featuring Wyclef Jean)	3:37
5.	"Día de Enero" (music video)	2:52
6.	"Hey You" (live from Hackney Empire, London) (MTV'5 Star Performance)	4:11
7.	"Illegal" (live from Hackney Empire, London) (MTV'5 Star Performance)	3:56
8.	"La Tortura" (live from Hackney Empire, London) (MTV'5 Star Performance)	3:35

== Personnel ==
Credits are adapted from Allmusic.

- David Alsina – bandoneon
- Gelipe Alvarez – programming
- Gian Arias – programming
- Paul Bushnell – bajo sexto
- Jorge Calandrelli – metales, orchestra director, string arrangements
- Juan Camatano – assistant engineer
- Dave Carpenter – bajo sexto
- Gustavo Celis – mixing
- Gustavo Cerati – composer, guest artist, guitar, keyboard, primary artist, producer, programming
- Chris Chaney – bajo sexto
- Luis Conte – percussion
- Pete Davis – keyboards, programming, trumpet
- Bruce Dukov
- Gary Foster – flute
- Bryan Gallant – assistant engineer
- Iker Gastaminza – engineer
- Danny George – project coordinator
- Serban Ghenea – mixing
- Mauricio Guerrero – engineer, mixing
- Victor Indrizzo – bateria, percussion
- Rob Jacobs – engineer, mixing
- Humberto (Kiro) Judex – accordion
- Steve Kajula – flute
- Ben Kaplan – assistant engineer
- Kevin Killen – engineer
- Tim LeBlanc – engineer
- Charles Loper – trombone
- Warren Luening – flugelhorn
- Terry Manning – engineer
- Maria Paula Marulanda – art direction
- David Massey – A&R
- Farra Mathews – A&R
- Bob McChensay – trombone
- Vlado Meller – mastering
- Lester Mendez – composer, keyboards, producer, programming
- Frank Marocco – accordion
- Jonathan Mover – bateria
- Teddy Mulet – trumpet
- Luis Fernando Ochoa – composer
- Carlos Paucar – engineer
- Shawn Pelton – bateria, percussion
- Archie Pena – percussion
- Tony Reyes – guitar, keyboards
- Rick Rubin – executive producer
- Alejandro Sanz – composer, guest artist, guitar, primary artist, tres Cubano, vocal arrangement
- Shakira – composer, vocals
- Mario Sorrenti – photography
- Ramón Stagnaro – guitar
- Rene Toledo – guitar
- José DeJesús Rosales "Halcón Dorado" Torres – production assistant, programming, remixing
- Dave Way – mixing
- Joe Wohlmuth – engineer
- Lyle Workman – guitar
- Rita Quintero - background vocals/arranger
- Mario Inchaust - background vocals
- Olgui Chirino - background vocals
- Emmanuel Cauvet - drums & programming

== Charts ==
Chart	Peak position
Belgian Albums Chart (Flanders)	47
Belgian Albums Chart (Wallonia)	78
Spanish Albums Chart	25
Swiss Albums Chart	91
US Billboard Top Latin Albums	13
US Billboard Latin Pop Albums	27

== Certifications ==
Region	Certification	Certified units/sales
Chile	Platinum	
Spain (Promusicae)	Gold	40,000^{^}
^{^} Shipments figures based on certification alone.
