= Día de Enero =

2006 single by Shakira

"Día de enero"
- Artwork used for the Mexican promotional CD single

Single by Shakira

from the album Fijación Oral, Vol. 1
- Language: Spanish
- Released: 19 January 2006
- Studio: Criteria Studios (Miami, FL)
- Length: 2:53
- Label: Epic
- Songwriter: Shakira
- Producer: Shakira

Shakira singles chronology
"Don't Bother" (2005)	"Día de enero" (2006)	"Hips Don't Lie" (2006)

Music video
- "Día de Enero" on YouTube

"Día de enero" (English: "Day in January") is a song written and recorded by the Colombian singer-songwriter Shakira. It was released as the third single from her sixth studio album, Fijación Oral Vol. 1, on January 19, 2006, by Epic Records. Written as a love letter to her then partner Antonio de la Rúa, the son of former president of Argentina, Fernando de la Rúa, the lyrics reference the controversy surrounding their relationship due to the Argentina's 2001 crisis during De la Rúa's presidency.

The love song was praised by music critics, who commended the song for its clever lyrics and sweetness, comparing her work to those of Alanis Morissette and Natalia Lafourcade. It became a success in Argentina, while also being a radio hit in the United States' Latin Pop Airplay chart, becoming her 20th top-ten hit. The music video for the song was directed by Shakira's longtime collaborator, Jaume de Laiguana, and it was shot in California, United States, portraiting a day in her life.

== Background and writing ==
In 1999, Shakira began a relationship with Argentine lawyer Antonio de la Rúa, the son of the then president of Argentina Fernando de la Rúa. This led to huge backlash in the country due to the social and economic crisis happening at the time in the nation, with journalists asking people to burn Shakira's CDs on national television. According to Shakira, the press perceived her relationship with De la Rúa as "frivolous". After the December 2001 riots in Argentina, many groups, including journalists and music retailers, sought to boycott Shakira's career in the country. In February 2002, Pablo di Paola, the then president of Tower Records Argentina took the decision to stop selling Shakira's albums in the country. In the documentary for her video album Live & off the Record (2004), Shakira revealed that trying to bring her Tour of the Mongoose to Argentina in 2003 turned into a "real soup opera" with a lot of discussion happening behind closed doors, with her team and then manager Freddy DeMann trying to persuade her to skip the country during the tour. The tour's production manager, Chris Lamband, and the tour manager, Fitzjoy Hellin, called the situation "insane." Shakira stated: "Not only the press was an issue, but logistics were nearly impossible and certainly unprofitable." Nevertheless, Shakira decided to go to Argentina despite the controversy.

On May 3, 2003, Shakira became the first Latin female artist to perform at Argentina's River Plate stadium, the sold-out show had over 60,000 people in attendance, including Argentinian celebrities and politicians such as actor Mariano Martínez, former vicepresident of Argentina Daniel Scioli and the former first lady of Argentina Inés Pertiné Urien. According to Argentine magazine Gente, her then boyfriend Antonio de la Rúa decided to not attend due to the controversy. Because of this situation, Shakira felt "very hurt." After finishing her performance, during the early morning of May 4, 2003, Shakira wrote "Día de Enero" by herself while being at her single hotel room at the Four Seasons Hotel Buenos Aires. She wrote the lyrics and the music at the same time without any instruments close at hand, and decided to record the demo with her portable tape recorder.

After extensive touring to promote the album Laundry Service (2001), the singer took a long hiatus. During this time, she began working on her next project and amassed 60 songs, split between English and Spanish. Out of those songs, 20 tracks were chosen and divided by language to create two separate albums: the Spanish one (Fijación Oral, Vol. 1) and the English one (Oral Fixation, Vol. 2). The Spanish-language album was considered a quintessential Latin pop album, adhering to the genre's conventions with a mix of melodramatic ballads and upbeat dance tracks. Shakira co-wrote all of the tracks on the album, sometimes in collaboration with either Luis Fernando Ochoa or Lester Mendez, with "Día de Enero" being one of the few self-written songs on the record. After releasing the second part of the album, "Dia de Enero" was selected to be the third single from Fijación Oral, Vol. 1 on 19 January 2006.

== Music and lyrics ==
Written by Shakira herself, "Día de Enero" is a love song that tells about how she met her former boyfriend, Antonio de la Rúa on a day in January. In addition to being a confession of her feelings for him, the song also describes the hardships they experienced during their relationship due to De la Rúa being the son of Argentina's former president, Fernando de la Rúa, who resigned after the December 2001 crisis. In an interview with Los 40, Shakira said the song was intended to be "a gift" to her boyfriend as a way "of trying to erase the wounds of his life." The song includes lyrics such as: "And even though you've been a foreigner in your own country, when I say "¿Cómo dices?", you still respond "¿Qué decís?" and you get emotional when you hear a bandoneon". The "¿Qué decís?" is an example of voseo, the usage of the Spanish-language pronoun vos for the second person singular, instead of tú in the rioplatense dialect of Spanish, the one that is spoken in Argentina, where Shakira's then boyfriend is from. A bandoneon is a typical instrument in that country too. According to Argentine magazine Gente, Shakira is referencing the unpopularity of De la Rúa in Argentina due to the political crisis during his father's presidency. In an interview with the magazine, Shakira stated: "Of course he is hurt by this situation. Antonio is a very sensitive and down-to-earth person. That is why I wrote [the song] immediately after the concert at the River stadium, in the solitude of my room".

Its lyrics also reference two famous comics characters "Mutt and Jeff", known in Spanish as "Eneas and Benitín." Matt Cibula of PopMatters compared "Día de Enero" to the music made by Mexican singer-songwriter Natalia Lafourcade. Shakira's vocals on the track were compared to Alanis Morissette's by IGN's Spence D, who said the singer incorporates "warbles" while singing.

== Reception ==
=== Critical ===
In a Fijación Oral, Vol. 1 review, Stephen Thomas Erlewine of Allmusic praised the body of work for combining "commercial savvy and smart writing". For Matt Cibula from PopMatters, the song is a "lovely sly tune that only grab[s] you the third or fourth time through the record", while IGN's Spence D. noted an "impressive Alanis Morrissette impersonation." In a Fijación Oral, Vol. 1 negative review, The Houston Chronicle selected the track as an album highlight, calling it "glittering and a "cute diversion". Hugo Fernández of La Higuera named it "one of her sweetest songs." For Mariana Enriquez from Rolling Stone Argentina, the song "reaches the same very high level" as the single "No" featuring Gustavo Cerati, which she predicted to become a classic. She praised its "effective and sweet melody", although she lamented that the song's muse was Antonio de la Rúa. Raquel Piñeiro of Vanity Fair España ranked it as her 14th best Spanish-language single, writing:

"Día de Enero is unlike any other Shakira song. It barely includes the signature vocal flourishes of her style and doesn’t showcase vocal acrobatics. Instead, it’s a simple and optimistic composition that, like the memory of past loves, fills us with nostalgia and sweetness."

Some English-speaking music critics such as Alexis Petridis of The Guardian were ambivalent about Shakira's songwriting in Spanish, referring to the lyrics of the song as "even more imponderable" than those of her English-language music, citing the line: "Te conocí un día de enero can la luna en mi nariz" which roughly translates to: "I met you one January day with the moon on my nose".

=== Commercial ===
"Dia de Enero" debuted on Billboard's Hot Latin Songs chart dated February 18, 2006 at number 32. It peaked at number 29 on the chart dated March 18, 2006. Similarly, the song peaked on the same chart edition on the Latin Pop Airplay, peaking higher at number 7, becoming Shakira's twentieth top-ten hit. It went higher in Argentina, where it peaked at number-one for two weeks on the Top 40 Argentina chart. It eventually ended up becoming the sixth most successful single of that year in the country.

== Music video ==
The accompanying music video for the song was directed by Shakira's longtime collaborator, Jaume de Laiguana. It was shot at a beach in California, in an attempt to reflect part of the singer's daily life. The video premiered worldwide on 27 February 2006. It shows Shakira walking along a beach at sunset and playing with pigeons. She also draws a heart in the sand with the letters "S y A" symbolising her love for her then-fiancée, Antonio de la Rúa. The video was included on Oral Fixation Volumes 1 & 2 bonus DVD, and the Spanish edition of Oral Fixation Tour.

== Personnel ==
Credits adapted from Discogs.com.

- Bandoneon – David Alsina
- Bass – Paul Bushnell
- Co-producer – Lester Mendez
- Drums – Shawn Pelton
- Guitar – Lyle Workman
- Keyboards – Lester Mendez
- Lyrics By, Music By – Shakira
- Mixed By – Rob Jacobs
- Percussion – Shawn Pelton
- Trumpet – Teddy Mulet

== Charts ==
Weekly chart performance for "Día de Enero"
Chart (2006)	Peak position
Argentina (Top 40 Argentina)	1
Bolivia (Notimex)	4
US Hot Latin Songs (Billboard)	29
US Latin Pop Airplay (Billboard)	7

Weekly chart performance for "Día de Enero"
Chart (2025)	Peak position
Argentina Hot 100 (Billboard)	96

== Certifications ==
Certifications and sales for "Dia De Enero"
Region	Certification	Certified units/sales
Mexico (AMPROFON)	3× Diamond+4× Platinum	1,140,000^{‡}
Spain (Promusicae)	Gold	30,000^{‡}
^{‡} Sales+streaming figures based on certification alone.
