= Día Especial =

Song by Shakira featuring Gustavo Cerati

from the album Fijación Oral Vol. 1
- Released: 28 November 2005
- Recorded: 2004–05
- Studio: Criteria Studios (Miami, FL)
- Genre: Pop rock
- Length: 4:25
- Label: Epic
- Composers: Shakira; Luis Fernando Ochoa
- Lyricist: Gustavo Cerati
- Producer: Shakira

"Día Especial" (English: Special Day) is a Latin pop ballad performed by Colombian singer Shakira from her album Fijación Oral Vol. 1. The song is about how a day is made special with forgiveness. "Día Especial" is not an official single from Fijación Oral Vol. 1, but was popular around the time of the album's release, peaking at number 26 on the Billboard Latin Pop Airplay chart. Gustavo Cerati was the lyricist for the track with Shakira and Luis Fernando Ochoa as co-writers for the music. Shakira performed the song together with Gustavo Cerati at the Live Earth concert in Germany on 7 July 2007, an event to promote awareness of the global warming, pollution, and environmental issues. The English version of the song is titled "The Day and the Time" with brand new lyrics written by Shakira and Pedro Aznar and is featured on the album Oral Fixation Vol. 2.

== Composition ==
"Día Especial" was created by Shakira, Gustavo Cerati and Luis Fernando Ochoa. The music opens with Gmaj7 and then follows the chord progression of Bm—D—A/C#—Em7. Sonically, the song combines Shakira's heartfelt vocals with Cerati's delicate guitar harmonies forming a dreamy and brooding ambience. Cerati's background vocals are present alongside Shakira's on the chorus. The lyrics of the song explore forgiveness, hope, and new opportunities after a heartbreak: "I’ve cried a thousand storms / I’ve blown away the clouds / The heartbeat of the sun is racing mine / And listen how / My heart is waiting."

== Reception ==
Mike Wass from Idolator called "Día Especial" "one of Shakira’s best non-singles". Billboard editors described how the song "stands out as an otherworldly highlight in [Shakira's] discography, offering listeners a melodic leap toward healing and reflection", praising Shakira's "evocative storytelling", and Cerati's "celestial-like guitar work." In 2018, Telediario dubbed "Día Especial" and "No" as "two of the most memorable songs" of Fijación Oral, Vol. 1. Wanda Pacheco from La Cadera de Eva explained how "this is the song we sing at the end of every playlist on screamed-out heartbreak."

Peter Murphy from Hot Press portrayed "The Day and the Time" as "perfectly polished but understated MOR with a Killers-cribbed synth break that might sound odd in your kitchen but a tonic on the radio". Garry Mulholland from The Guardian praised the song stating that it's 'lovely'. Spence D. from IGN described how Shakira is "flexing an almost pitch perfect ode", stating that the song is a "breath of fresh air" and "features some excellent ambiance rolling throughout", and pointing out Shakira's "chameleonic vocal nuances", and her "rich tenor punching the notes and lyrics with angst ridden ennui". Matt Cibula from PopMatters reflected on how "there is something extremely avant about Shakira’s voice" "made up of equal parts Cher and Alanis and Nancy Sinatra" that gives the song "an edge that most pop singers can rarely achieve". David Browne from Entertainment Weekly inscribed the song as "well-crafted but banal".

== Live performances ==
On 7 July 2007, Shakira performed "Día Especial" together with Gustavo Cerati at the Live Earth concert in Hamburg, Germany, receiving an applause in the event held to raise awareness of the impact of global warming. Her setlist also included the singles "Don't Bother", "Inevitable", and "Hips Don't Lie".

In December 2025, Shakira performed the song in Buenos Aires as a part of her Las Mujeres Ya No Lloran World Tour. Before singing the song, she proclaimed in Spanish: "Whenever we were together, he made me feel like it was a 'día especial'. That’s why our friendship will last forever.” During the performance, pictures of Cerati were displayed on the screens of the stadium and an old recording of him singing the song was played. The performance went viral on social media and was dubbed "the most moving moment" of the concert by Miriam Garcia of Quién magazine.

== Charts ==
Chart (2006)	Peak position
US Billboard Latin Pop Airplay	26
