= Fijación Oral, Vol. 1 =

2005 studio album by Shakira

Studio album by Shakira
- Released: 3 June 2005
- Recorded: 2004–2005
- Studios: Warehouse (Vancouver, Canada); La Marimonda (Bahamas); The Hit Factory (Miami, US); O'Henry Sound (Burbank, US)
- Genre: Latin pop
- Length: 43:30
- Languages: Spanish; French; German
- Label: Epic
- Producer: Shakira

Shakira chronology
Live & off the Record (2004)	Fijación Oral, Vol. 1 (2005)	Oral Fixation, Vol. 2 (2005)

Singles from Fijación Oral, Vol. 1
- 1. "La Tortura" Released: 12 April 2005; 2. "No" Released: 2 July 2005; 3. "Día de Enero" Released: 19 January 2006; 4. "La Pared" Released: 3 October 2006; 5. "Las de la Intuición" Released: 14 May 2007; 6. "Dia especial" Released: 2006

Fijación Oral, Vol. 1 (English: Oral Fixation, Vol. 1, Spanish: [fi.xaˌsjõn oˌɾal β̞oˌlu.mẽn ˈu.no]) is the sixth studio album by Colombian singer-songwriter Shakira. It was released on 3 June 2005 by Epic Records. After attaining international success in 2001 with her fifth studio album and first English-language record, Laundry Service, Shakira wanted to release a fifth Spanish-language project as a follow-up. In the vein of her earlier work, Fijación Oral, Vol. 1 is a Latin pop album. Shakira enlisted Rick Rubin as executive producer, also working with Gustavo Cerati, Lester Mendez, Luis Fernando Ochoa and Jose "Gocho" Torres.

Music critics generally acclaimed Shakira's artistic growth on Fijación Oral, Vol. 1. The album debuted at number four on the US Billboard 200 with first-week sales of 157,000 copies, setting a record for the highest debut of a full-length Spanish-language album in the US. As of 2017, it ranked among the best-selling Latin pop albums of all time in the US. Internationally, Fijación Oral, Vol. 1 reached number one in Argentina, Germany, Mexico, and Spain, and it has been certified diamond in Colombia and Mexico. In 2006, it won Best Latin Rock/Alternative Album at the 48th Annual Grammy Awards, and Album of the Year and Best Female Pop Vocal Album at the 7th Latin Grammy Awards. Shakira became the first female artist to win the Latin Grammy for Album of the Year.

Four singles were released to promote the album. Its lead single, "La Tortura", entered the US Billboard Hot 100 and reached number one in Hungary, Spain, and Venezuela. The follow-up singles "No", "Día de Enero" and "Las de la Intuición" charted on the Hot Latin Songs, Tropical Songs and Latin Pop Airplay charts. Shakira released a sequel album, the English-language Oral Fixation, Vol. 2 (2005); both albums were released as a box set titled Oral Fixation, Vol. 1 & 2 (2006). Shakira promoted both albums with the Oral Fixation Tour (2006–2007), which visited the Americas, Africa, Asia and Europe. A performance in Miami was filmed and released as a live album, Oral Fixation Tour, in November 2007.

== Background ==
"The idea of making a double project was never planned or premeditated, it just happened. I found myself writing 60 songs and put myself on the mission of selecting my favorite ones, which happened to be 20. And those 20 songs formed this project, Oral Fixation Vol. 1 and 2."

— Shakira talking about both albums.

After achieving international success in 2001 with her first English album, Laundry Service, Shakira released a Spanish-language record as its followup (her first since 1998's Dónde Están los Ladrones?). Having co-written nearly sixty songs for the project, she decided to divide the release into two volumes and put herself "on the mission of selecting [her] favorite ones" to record. Fijación Oral, Vol. 1 contains all Spanish-language songs and Oral Fixation, Vol. 2 features all English-language tracks. Shakira initially said that the second volume would have a "completely new repertory of songs", although the completed album included two English translations of songs from the first record. It was reissued in 2006 as an expanded version with an additional translated recording and her future international-hit single, "Hips Don't Lie". When recording the albums, she worked with previous collaborators Lester Mendez and Luis Fernando Ochoa and new partners Gustavo Cerati and Jose "Gocho" Torres.

For the album, Shakira wrote all the lyrics, and the majority of the music. "To start seeing people's first reactions, and how people start relating to these songs and appreciating every single piece of work I have done over the past two years, is the best reward an artist can have after so much hard work," says Shakira. "I will not lie to you; it was not a path of roses. It was painful at times to come up with two albums, to write more than 60 songs and to fight my own insecurities and doubts." While speaking about the difference about expressing herself in Spanish and English, Shakira told, "When I express myself in Spanish, I find elements that help me express an idea in perhaps a different way than when I do it in English. There are different aesthetics, but there is a certain style to the way I write my own songs, a particular way of describing feelings and emotions that I have developed over all these years making songs. I have gotten in touch with my own gift – I am sure, 10 years ago, I was not half as good as I can say I am today, and I am still not good enough. There is a long way to go."

== Cover art and release ==
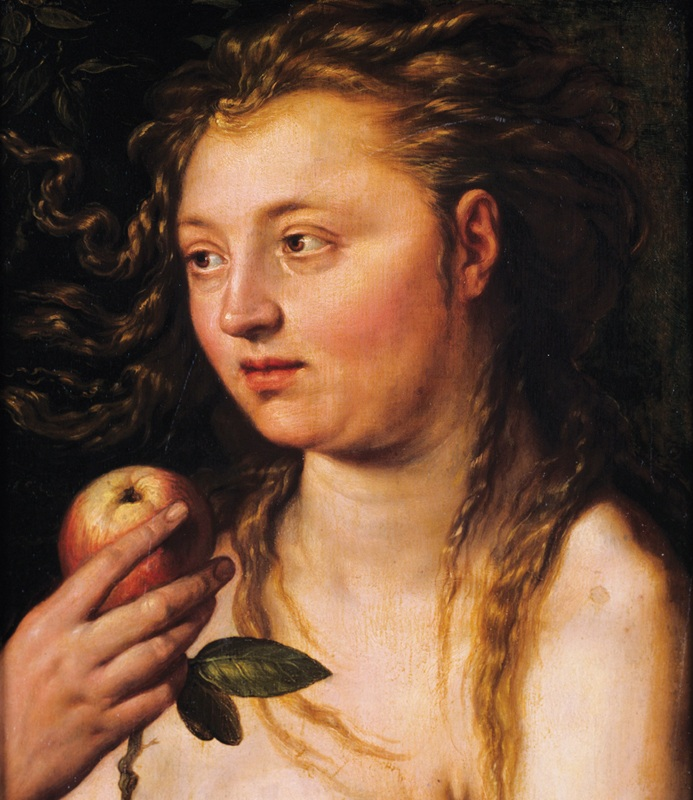
The album's cover was influenced by the biblical figure of Eve (pictured).

The artwork for both Oral Fixation albums was inspired by Eve, the first woman; Shakira said she wanted "to attribute to Eve one more reason to bite the forbidden fruit, and that would be her oral fixation" and that "[she always felt] that [she has] been a very oral person. [It is her] biggest source of pleasure". The first volume's cover depicts Shakira holding a baby girl in her arms; the artwork for the second album shows a nude Shakira (covered by tree branches), with the infant sitting in the tree. She stated that both covers alluded to psychoanalyst Sigmund Freud's theory that infants begin discovering the world through their mouths during the oral stage of psychosexual development.

For Jon Pareles of The New York Times, "For obvious reasons, [the artwork for the second album is] eye-catching, as was the cover of the Spanish-language companion album, Fijación Oral, Vol. 1".

On 23 January 2007, Fijación Oral, Vol. 1 and Oral Fixation, Vol. 2 were released as a three-disc box set, titled Oral Fixation, Vol. 1 & 2. Each record was on a separate disc, and was packaged with a DVD featuring music videos and live recordings of album tracks. The compilation peaked at numbers 13 and 27 on the Billboard Latin Pop Albums and Top Latin Albums charts.

== Composition ==
"La Tortura" (2005)
Sample of Shakira's "La Tortura", the lead single from Fijación Oral, Vol. 1. The song has a back-and-forth dialogue between Shakira and Alejandro Sanz in the chorus.

Fijación Oral, Vol. 1 is a Latin pop album. The introductory track, "En Tus Pupilas" ("In Your Pupils"), incorporates folk music styles and its opening verse includes French-language lyrics. "La Pared" ("The Wall") has been compared stylistically to the 1980s duo Eurythmics. "La Tortura" ("The Torture") features Spanish singer-songwriter Alejandro Sanz, with elements of Colombian cumbia music, dancehall and electronica. "Obtener un Sí" ("Obtain a Yes") is a bossa nova song with cha-cha-chá elements against an orchestral background. "Día Especial" ("Special Day") features Argentinean singer-songwriter Gustavo Cerati on guitar.

The sixth track, "Escondite Inglés", has a new wave feel. "No" also features Cerati on guitar, using a simple melody to emphasize Shakira's vocals. "Las de la Intuición" ("The Ones with the Intuition") has synth-pop elements, while "Día de Enero" ("January Day") has been compared to Mexican singer-songwriter Natalia Lafourcade. "Lo Imprescindible" ("Bare Essentials") has German-language verses in which Shakira lyrically expresses "stay baby stay. Baby don't leave me again". The disc concludes with an acoustic version of "La Pared" and the Shaketon remix of "La Tortura".

== Singles ==
"La Tortura" was released as the lead single from Fijación Oral, Vol. 1 on 12 April 2005. It features Spanish singer-songwriter Alejandro Sanz, and was praised for its production and reggaeton influence. "La Tortura" was the only single from the album to chart on the US Billboard Hot 100 (peaking at number twenty-three), and reached number one on the Billboard Hot Latin Songs, Tropical Songs, and Latin Pop Airplay charts. The song set a record for the most weeks at number one, and additionally became the best-performing Latin single of the year. The track was eventually certified Gold by the Recording Industry Association of America (RIAA) for selling over 500,000 copies and certified platinum for selling over 1 million mastertones . Internationally, "La Tortura" topped the Hungarian Rádiós Top 40 and the Spanish and Venezuelan singles charts. Its music video was directed by Michael Haussman, depicting a fictionally-romantic Shakira and Sanz.

The follow-up singles were also successful. The second single, "No", features Argentinian singer-songwriter Gustavo Cerati and reached numbers two and eleven, respectively, on the Billboard Latin Pop Songs and Latin Songs charts. The video was filmed in a black-and-white effect, and was directed by Jaume de Laiguana. After the release of "Don't Bother" as the lead single from Oral Fixation, Vol. 2 in late 2005, "Día de Enero" was the third single from Fijación Oral, Vol. 1. It peaked at numbers seven and twenty-nine on the Billboard Latin Pop Songs and Latin Songs charts, respectively. Like "No", its accompanying video was directed by de Laiguana. The clip refers to Shakira's then-boyfriend Antonio de la Rúa as she writes the letters "S y A" in a heart drawn in the sand.

Following the release of "Hips Don't Lie" and "Illegal" as the second and third singles from Oral Fixation, Vol. 2, the fourth and final single from Fijación Oral, Vol. 1, "Las De La Intuición", reached numbers eleven and thirty-one, respectively, on the Billboard Latin Pop Songs and Latin Songs charts and number 1 in Spain. Its video shows Shakira in a purple wig. Shakira later recorded an English-language version of the song, titled "Pure Intuition".

== Promotion ==
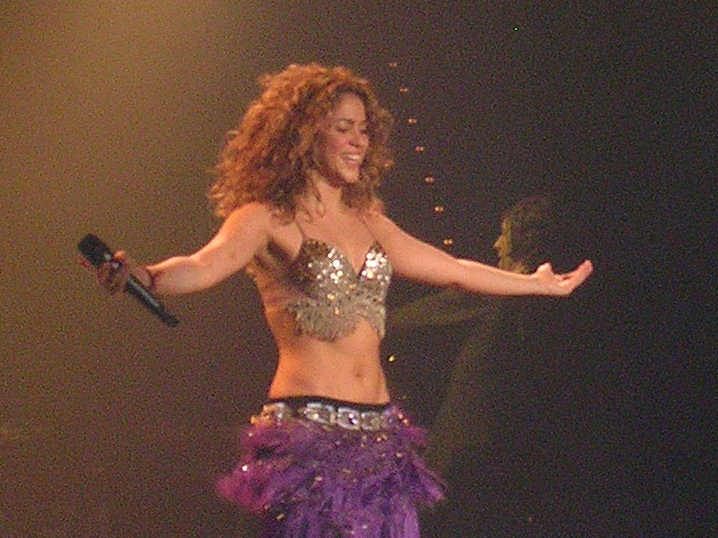
Shakira performing during the Oral Fixation Tour, 2006

To promote Fijación Oral, Vol. 1 and Oral Fixation, Vol. 2, Shakira began her Oral Fixation Tour on 14 June 2006 at the Feria De Muestras in Zaragoza, Spain. With assistance from the Creative Artists Agency, she visited twenty-seven cities and performed forty-one shows across five continents. The tour was additionally sponsored by Spanish automobile manufacturer SEAT, with whom Shakira also collaborated to support her Pies Descalzos Foundation. The tour concluded on 9 July 2007 at the Turkcell Kuruçeşme Arena in Istanbul, Turkey. It grossed over $42 million in North and Latin America, and $100 million worldwide. The set list consisted primarily of Spanish-language songs, and included singles from her earlier career.

In November 2007 Epic Records released the Oral Fixation Tour live album on Blu-ray Disc, which was filmed during a December 2006 show in Miami, Florida. William Ruhlmann of AllMusic gave it a positive review, complimenting Shakira's vocals and dancing talent.

== Critical reception ==
Professional ratings
Aggregate scores
Source	Rating
Metacritic	79/100
Review scores
Source	Rating
AllMusic	4.5/5 stars
Blender	4/5 stars
E!	B
Entertainment Weekly	B+
The Guardian	3/5 stars
Los Angeles Times	2.5/4 stars
Paste	3/5 stars
PopMatters	8/10
Rolling Stone	3.5/5 stars
Yahoo! Music	9/10

At Metacritic (which assigns a normalized rating out of 100 to reviews from mainstream critics) Fijación Oral, Vol. 1 received an average score of 79 based on 13 reviews, indicating "generally favorable reviews". Stephen Thomas Erlewine of AllMusic said that "it's hard to wait for Oral Fixation, Vol. 2 to arrive", given the strength of the "commercial savvy and smart writing" displayed in the first volume. Matt Cibula of PopMatters shared a similar sentiment, adding that his excitement about Oral Fixation, Vol. 2 is a "massive understatement". Entertainment Weekly's Ernesto Lechner felt that Shakira "has found herself again" by "placing her operatic vocalizing at the service of Spanish poetry", adding that this was her strongest album to date.

The Guardian's Dave Simpson noted that "the songs are catchy, with melodies good enough to tempt non-Spanish speakers to sing along". Jon Pareles of The New York Times described the album as "blissfully pan-American", elaborating that "for Shakira it's all pop, taut structures for volatile passion". Barry Walters of Rolling Stone said that executive producer Rick Rubin helped "restore Shakira's artistic integrity by keeping the industry at bay". Yahoo! Music's Tom Townsend praised Shakira for being "wide awake and, as they used to say in Smash Hits, back, back, BACK!" Paste's Mark Kemp gave it a mixed review, saying that the record was "stronger overall than Laundry Service but not as warm as Dónde Están los Ladrones?"

== Commercial performance ==
According to the label, Fijación Oral Vol. I sold 1.5 million of copies worldwide on it first two week and debut at the number one of seventeen countries, surpassing their expectations. In North America, the largest Latin retail chain in the United States refused to sell the album, Fijación Oral, Vol. 1 debuted at number four on the US Billboard 200, with first-week sales of 157,000 copies. It set a record for the highest debut of a full-length Spanish-language album in the country, both in sales and its chart position. Its Billboard 200 record lasted for 15 years, being surpassed by Puerto Rican singer Bad Bunny and his album El Último Tour del Mundo, which debuted at number-one on the chart in December 2020. Fijación Oral, Vol. 1 topped the Billboard Top Latin Albums chart. It sold 77,000 copies in the second week, which is still higher than any other Spanish-language album. According to Nielsen SoundScan, the album sold over 1,019,000 copies (as of October 2017) in the US, making it the eight bestselling Latin album in the country. It was later certified platinum eleven times by Latin standards, with shipments of over 1,100,000 copies. In 2009, Billboard named Fijación Oral, Vol. 1 as the best-selling Latin pop album of the 2000s. In Mexico, the album debuted at number one, and was later certified triple platinum for shipments of 300,000 copies.

In South America, Fijación Oral, Vol. 1 peaked at number one in Argentina, and was eventually recognized with triple-platinum certification. The album enjoyed similar success in Venezuela, selling over 34,613 copies. Consequently, it was certified platinum in the country. Furthermore, the record sold over 100,000 copies in Shakira's native Colombia, and was later recognized with triple-platinum certification. In Chile, it was certified platinum for shipping 15,000 copies.

In Europe, Fijación Oral, Vol. 1 achieved similar success. It debuted at number two on the Austrian albums chart, where it was certified platinum for shipments of 30,000 copies. The record peaked at numbers seven and fifteen, respectively, on the Belgian Walloon and Flanders album charts; it was certified gold for shipments of 25,000 copies. On the French albums chart the album reached number six, and was certified gold for shipments of 100,000 copies. It topped the German Media Control Charts, receiving a platinum certification for shipments of 200,000 copies. The record was certified gold in Greece for shipments of 10,000 copies. On the Hungarian albums chart it reached number six, receiving a platinum certification for shipments of 20,000 copies. The album peaked at number seven on the Dutch Top 40. The record topped the Spanish albums chart, receiving triple-platinum certification for shipments of 240,000 copies. After peaking at number two on the Swiss Hitparade, the album was certified platinum for shipments of 40,000 copies. As of May 2013, the record has sold over four million copies worldwide.

== Legacy ==
Stephen Thomas Erlewine of AllMusic said that releasing the Spanish-language Fijación Oral, Vol. 1 after the success of the English-language Laundry Service was a "sharp move", complimenting the album for demonstrating that Shakira "can not only return to her roots, but expand upon them". He described "La Tortura" as a "natural for American radio", and felt that the parent album generated anticipation for the upcoming Oral Fixation, Vol. 2. Writing for PopMatters, Matt Cibula praised the album for its musical departure from Laundry Service, applauding the integration of subtle samples across several songs as "great nods to the sounds of the 1980s". Dave Simpson of The Guardian compared Shakira to a "Latin American Madonna", describing her vocals as reminiscent of "Cher and Hazel O'Connor, produced by Julio Iglesias".

Jon Pareles of The New York Times found Shakira's "smart or ambitious" image to be uncharacteristic of a sex symbol. He praised the versatility of her multilingual lyrics and her experimentation in a number of genres, citing the "multiplicity" in "the arrangements, in the mixed emotions of the lyrics, [and] in Shakira's mercurial voice". Writing for Paste, Mark Kemp complimented Shakira for dispelling notions she is "the Latin Britney, the female Ricky Martin [and] the pretty pop tart who sings in Spanish and sounds like Alanis"; he compared the mix of musical elements in Fijación Oral, Vol. 1 to a Pop-Tart with a "rich and nutritious filling". Tom Townsend of Yahoo! Music called her "the greatest pop star we have", comparing her "consuming artistry" to that of Madonna and Prince. He credited the album for inspiring a revival of pop music, saying that the release proved that the genre "wasn't dead, just sleeping".

Shakira's international success was solidified with Fijación Oral, Vol. 1's strong commercial performance. After it debuted at number 4 on the US Billboard 200 and became the highest-debuting full-length Spanish album in the country, her label Epic Records called her "the biggest female crossover artist in the world". The album is her third-highest-charting release in the nation, behind Laundry Service's peak position at number 3 and Shakira's number 2 peak. According to Billboard, it was the second best-selling Latin album of the decade in the US after Barrio Fino by Daddy Yankee.

=== Accolades ===
At the 2005 Billboard Music Awards, Fijación Oral, Vol. 1 was the Latin Pop Album of the Year. At the 2005 Mexican Oye! Awards, the album was the Pop Album of the Year by a Female Artist. At the 2005 Premios Shock awards ceremony, it received an award for "Album of the Year". In the same year, it was nominated in the category of "Me Muero Sin Ese CD" ("CD to Die For") at the 2005 Premios Juventud. The album was the Best Latin Rock or Alternative Album at the 2006 Grammy Awards, and was Album of the Year, Best Engineered Album and the Best Female Pop Vocal Album at the Latin Grammy Awards of 2006. That year, at the 13th Billboard Latin Music Awards, the album was the best Latin Pop Album by a Female. It was the Pop Album of the Year at the 18th Lo Nuestro Awards. Fijación Oral, Vol. 1 received an ALMA Award as Spanish Album of the Year. At the 2006 Groovevolt Music Awards, it was named Best Latin Album. At the Colombian Nuestra Tierra award ceremony, it was nominated Best Album of the Year which went to Fonseca for Corazón.

== Track listing ==
All lyrics are written by Shakira, except where noted.

No.	Title	Music	Producer(s)	Length
1.	"En Tus Pupilas"	Shakira; Luis F. Ochoa	Shakira; Ochoa^{[a]}	4:24
2.	"La Pared"	Shakira; Lester Mendez	Shakira; Mendez^{[a]}	3:20
3.	"La Tortura" (featuring Alejandro Sanz)	Shakira; Ochoa	Shakira; Mendez^{[a]}; Gocho^{[b]}	3:35
4.	"Obtener un Sí"	Shakira; Mendez	Shakira; Mendez^{[a]}	3:21
5.	"Día Especial" (featuring Gustavo Cerati) (lyrics: Cerati)	Shakira; Ochoa	Shakira; Cerati^{[a]}	4:25
6.	"Escondite Inglés"	Shakira	Shakira; Mendez^{[a]}	3:10
7.	"No" (featuring Gustavo Cerati)	Shakira; Mendez	Shakira; Mendez^{[a]}; Cerati^{[a]}	4:47
8.	"Las de la Intuición"	Shakira; Ochoa	Shakira; Mendez^{[a]}; Ochoa^{[a]}	3:42
9.	"Día de Enero"	Shakira	Shakira; Mendez^{[a]}	2:55
10.	"Lo Imprescindible"	Shakira; Mendez	Shakira; Mendez^{[a]}	3:58
11.	"La Pared" (Versión Acústica)	Shakira; Mendez	Shakira; Mendez^{[a]}	2:41
12.	"La Tortura" (Shaketon Remix) (featuring Alejandro Sanz)	Shakira; Ochoa	Shakira; Mendez^{[a]}; Gocho^{[b]}	3:12

Fijación Oral, Vol. 1 – 20th anniversary edition
No.	Title	Length
13.	"La Tortura" (Reggaeton Mix) (featuring Alejandro Sanz)	3:44

DualDisc edition bonus DVD
No.	Title	Length
1.	"La Tortura" (Music video)	3:45
2.	"The making of Fijación Oral, Vol. 1"	6:56
3.	"Conversation with Alejandro Sanz" (Interview)	24:14

Target edition (CD 2)
No.	Title	Length
1.	"Fool" (Live from Rotterdam)	3:46
2.	"Dónde Están los Ladrones?" (Live from Rotterdam)	5:16
3.	"La Tortura" (Reggaeton Mix) (featuring Alejandro Sanz)	3:44

Notes

- ^{^a} signifies an assistant producer
- ^{^b} signifies an additional producer

== Personnel ==
Credits are adapted from AllMusic.

- David Alsina – bandoneon
- Gelipe Alvarez – programming
- Gian Arias – programming
- Paul Bushnell, Dave Carpenter, Chris Chaney – bass guitar
- Jorge Calandrelli – metales, orchestra director, string arrangements
- Juan Camatano – assistant engineer
- Gustavo Celis – mixing
- Gustavo Cerati – composer, guest artist, guitar, keyboard, primary artist, producer, programming
- Luis Conte – percussion
- Pete Davis – keyboards, programming, trumpet
- Bruce Dukov
- Gary Foster – flute
- Bryan Gallant – assistant engineer
- Iker Gastaminza – engineer
- Dan George – project manager
- Serban Ghenea – mixing
- Mauricio Guerrero – engineer, mixing
- Victor Indrizzo – drums, percussion
- Rob Jacobs – engineer, mixing
- Humberto (Kiro) Judex, Frank Marocco – accordion
- Steve Kajula – flute
- Ben Kaplan – assistant engineer
- Kevin Killen – engineer
- Tim LeBlanc – engineer
- Charles Loper, Bob McChensay – trombone
- Warren Luening – flugelhorn
- Terry Manning – engineer
- Maria Paula Marulanda – art direction
- David Massey – A&R
- Farra Mathews – A&R
- Vlado Meller – mastering
- Lester Mendez – composer, producer, keyboards, programming
- Jonathan Mover – drums
- Teddy Mulet – trumpet
- Luis Fernando Ochoa – composer
- Carlos Paucar – engineer
- Shawn Pelton – drums, percussion
- Archie Pena – percussion
- Tony Reyes – guitar, keyboards
- Rick Rubin – executive producer
- Alejandro Sanz – composer, guest artist, guitar, primary artist, très, vocal arrangement
- Shakira – composer, vocals
- Mario Sorrenti – photography
- Ramón Stagnaro, René Toledo, Lyle Workman – guitar
- José DeJesús Rosales "Halcón Dorado" Torres – production assistant, programming, remixing
- Dave Way – mixing
- Joe Wohlmuth – engineer

== Charts ==
=== Weekly charts ===
Chart (2005)	Peak position
Argentine Albums (CAPIF)	1
Austrian Albums (Ö3 Austria)	2
Belgian Albums (Ultratop Flanders)	15
Belgian Albums (Ultratop Wallonia)	6
Chilean Albums Chart	1
Czech Albums (ČNS IFPI)	19
Dutch Albums (Album Top 100)	7
European Top 100 Albums	2
Finnish Albums (Suomen virallinen lista)	3
French Albums (SNEP)	6
German Albums (Offizielle Top 100)	1
Hungarian Albums (MAHASZ)	6
Italian Albums (FIMI)	18
Mexican Albums (AMPROFON)	1
Portuguese Albums (AFP)	8
Spanish Albums (Promusicae)	1
Swedish Albums (Sverigetopplistan)	14
Swiss Albums (Schweizer Hitparade)	2
Taiwanese Albums (Five Music)	4
US Billboard 200	4
US Top Latin Albums (Billboard)	1
US Latin Pop Albums (Billboard)	1

=== Year-end charts ===
Chart (2005)	Position
Argentine Albums Chart	2
Austrian Albums (Ö3 Austria)	23
Belgian Albums (Ultratop Flanders)	71
Belgian Albums (Ultratop Wallonia)	48
Dutch Albums (Album Top 100)	45
French Albums (SNEP)	76
German Albums (Offizielle Top 100)	13
Hungarian Albums (MAHASZ)	48
Mexican Albums (AMPROFON)	2
Spanish Albums (PROMUSICAE)	4
Swiss Albums (Schweizer Hitparade)	8
US Billboard 200	87
US Top Latin Albums (Billboard)	2
Worldwide Albums (IFPI)	27

Chart (2006)	Position
Mexican Albums (AMPROFON)	85
US Latin Pop Albums (Billboard)	4

=== Decade-end charts ===
Chart (2000–2009)	Position
US Top Latin Albums (Billboard)	2
US Latin Pop Albums (Billboard)	1

== Certifications and sales ==
Region	Certification	Certified units/sales
Argentina (CAPIF)	3× Platinum	120,000^{^}
Austria (IFPI Austria)	Platinum	30,000^{*}
Belgium (BRMA)	Gold	25,000^{*}
Brazil (Pro-Música Brasil)	Gold	50,000^{‡}
Chile	7× Platinum	
Colombia (ASINCOL) Physical Sales	Diamond	100,000
Colombia Digital sales	Gold	
Ecuador	—	10,000
France (SNEP)	Gold	100,000^{*}
Germany (BVMI)	3× Gold	300,000^{^}
Greece (IFPI Greece)	Gold	10,000^{^}
Hungary (MAHASZ)	Platinum	10,000^{^}
Japan (Oricon Charts)	—	15,519
Mexico (AMPROFON)	Diamond+2× Platinum	700,000^{‡}
Portugal (AFP)	Gold	10,000^{^}
Romania (UPFR)	Platinum	
Russia (NFPF)	Platinum	20,000^{*}
Spain (Promusicae)	3× Platinum	300,000^{^}
Switzerland (IFPI Switzerland)	Platinum	40,000^{^}
United States (RIAA)	11× Platinum (Latin)	1,100,000^{^} / 1,019,000
Venezuela (APFV)	Platinum	34,613
Summaries
Central America (CFC)	Platinum	20,000
Europe (IFPI)	Platinum	1,000,000^{*}
^{*} Sales figures based on certification alone.^{^} Shipments figures based on certification alone.^{‡} Sales+streaming figures based on certification alone.

== See also ==
- 2005 in Latin music
- List of number-one Billboard Latin Pop Albums from the 2000s
- List of number-one Billboard Top Latin Albums of 2005
- List of best-selling albums in Mexico
- List of best-selling Latin albums
- List of best-selling Latin albums in the United States
