= Oral Fixation, Vol. 2 =

2005 studio album by Shakira

Studio album by Shakira
- Released: 27 November 2005
- Recorded: 2004–2005
- Studios: The Warehouse Studio (Vancouver, BC); La Marimonda (Nassau, Bahamas); Hit Factory Criteria (Miami, FL); Unisono (Buenos Aires, Argentina); Skyline Studios (New York, NY); Church of the Epiphany (Miami, FL); Fantasy Studios (San Francisco, CA); AIR Studios (London, England); Supersonic Studios (Miami, FL); Ike's Garage (Miami, FL); Sony Music (New York, NY); Criteria (Miami, FL)
- Genre: Pop rock
- Length: 42:36
- Languages: English; Latin; Arabic; Hebrew; French
- Label: Epic
- Producer: Shakira

Shakira chronology
| Fijación Oral, Vol. 1 (2005) | Oral Fixation, Vol. 2 (2005) | Oral Fixation, Vol. 1 & 2 (2006) |

Singles from Oral Fixation, Vol. 2
- 1. "Don't Bother" Released: 11 October 2005; 2. "Illegal" Released: 14 November 2006

Singles from Oral Fixation, Vol. 2 (2006 reissue)
- 1. "Hips Don't Lie" Released: 28 February 2006

Oral Fixation, Vol. 2 (Spanish: Fijación Oral, Vol. 2, Spanish: [fi.xaˌsjõn oˌɾal β̞oˌlu.mẽn̪ ˈd̪os]) is the seventh studio album and second English-language album by Colombian singer-songwriter Shakira, released on 27 November 2005, by Epic Records. After attaining international success with her fifth studio effort, Laundry Service (2001), Shakira decided to create a two-part follow-up record. She released the project as the follow-up to her sixth studio effort, Fijación Oral, Vol. 1, with which she had attained international success five months prior. As the record producer, Shakira enlisted assistant producers including previous collaborators Gustavo Cerati, Lester Mendez, Luis Fernando Ochoa and Rick Rubin to work alongside newer partners Jerry Duplessis, Wyclef Jean, Tim Mitchell and The Matrix.

Musically the album follows in the vein of her earlier works: heavily influenced by Latin pop styles, it additionally incorporates elements of dance-pop and pop rock. Upon its release, Oral Fixation, Vol. 2 received generally favorable reviews from music critics, who complimented it as her strongest project to date. The album debuted at number five on the US Billboard 200 with first-week sales of 128,000 copies. The album was later certified platinum by the Recording Industry Association of America (RIAA) and has sold over 1.7 million units in the country. It additionally topped charts in Denmark and Mexico.

Three singles were released from the album. Its lead single, "Don't Bother", reached number 42 on the US Billboard Hot 100. Due to its underperformance, the album was reissued on 28 March 2006 with a revised tracklist and two added tracks: "Hips Don't Lie" and an alternate version of "La Tortura". "Hips Don't Lie" was released as the lead single of the reissue and second single overall. It peaked at number one in seventeen countries including the US, becoming her first single to do so. The third and final single, "Illegal", peaked at number one on the Billboard Hot Dance Club Songs component chart. In December 2006, the album was included in a box set along with Fijación Oral, Vol. 1, titled Oral Fixation, Vol. 1 & 2. Both projects were promoted through the Oral Fixation Tour, which visited 39 countries throughout 2006 and 2007.

== Background and composition ==
"The idea of making a double project was never planned or premeditated, it just happened. I found myself writing 60 songs and put myself on the mission of selecting my favorite ones, which happened to be 20. And those 20 songs formed this project, Oral Fixation Vol. 1 and 2."

— Shakira talking about both albums

After attaining international success with her third studio effort, Laundry Service, in 2001, Shakira opted to create a two-part follow-up record. Having co-written nearly sixty tracks for Laundry Service, she put herself "on the mission of selecting [her] favorite ones" to record for Oral Fixation, Vol. 2 and its predecessor, the Spanish-language Fijación Oral, Vol. 1. While recording the project, Shakira worked with previous collaborators Gustavo Cerati, Lester Mendez, Luis Fernando Ochoa and Rick Rubin, and newer partners Jerry Duplessis, Wyclef Jean, Tim Mitchell and The Matrix.

For the album, Shakira wrote all the lyrics, and wrote or co-wrote all of the music. "To start seeing people's first reactions, and how people start relating to these songs and appreciating every single piece of work I have done over the past two years, is the best reward an artist can have after so much hard work," says Shakira. "I will not lie to you; it was not a path of roses. It was painful at times to come up with two albums, to write more than 60 songs and to fight my own insecurities and doubts." While speaking about the difference about expressing herself in Spanish and English, Shakira said, "When I express myself in Spanish, I find elements that help me express an idea in perhaps a different way than when I do it in English. There are different aesthetics, but there is a certain style to the way I write my own songs, a particular way of describing feelings and emotions that I have developed over all these years making songs. I have gotten in touch with my own gift - I am sure, 10 years ago, I was not half as good as I can say I am today, and I am still not good enough. There is a long way to go."

== Cover art ==
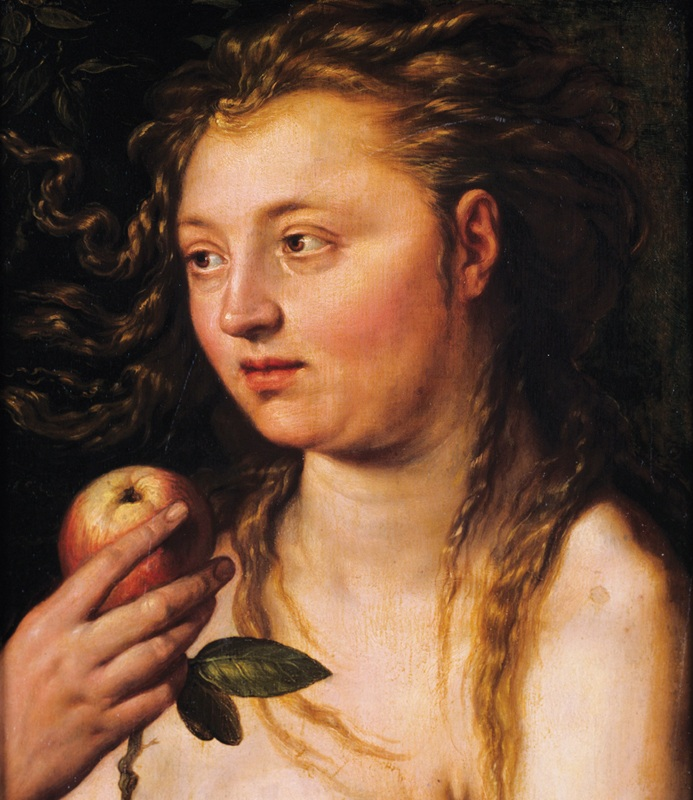
The album's cover was influenced by the biblical figure of Eve (pictured).

Shakira designed the artwork for both Oral Fixation records, and commented that they were inspired by the biblical figure of Eve, elaborating that she wanted "to attribute to Eve one more reason to bite the forbidden fruit, and that would be her oral fixation" and that "[she always felt] that [she has] been a very oral person. [It is her] biggest source of pleasure". The second volume's cover sees an unclothed Shakira covered by a tree's branches and leaves while holding an apple in her hand. The baby girl she held in her arms on the cover of the first volume is sitting in the tree, alluding to psychoanalyst Sigmund Freud's theory that infants begin discovering the world through their mouths during the oral stage of psychosexual development.

For Jon Pareles of The New York Times, "For obvious reasons, it's eye-catching, as was the cover of the Spanish-language companion album, Fijación Oral, Vol. 1". On Middle East versions of the album, Shakira was covered up with leaves which left her standing behind a bush, which surprised the singer. Complex magazine selected the album cover as the eleventh "sexiest album cover of all time", writing that it is "the hottest portrayal of Eve in the Garden of Eden we can imagine." Maxim also listed the album's cover as one of the "sexiest album covers", writing that, "A naked girl holding up an apple in a garden is played out, but not when the girl is hip-shaking Shakira. Damn, it could happen all over again, couldn't it?"

== Music and lyrics ==
At AllMusic, Stephen Thomas Erlewine noted the album included "[the] expected Latin rhythms", "glitzy Euro disco", "trashy American rock & roll", and "stomping Britpop".

Songwriting Universe compared the opening track "How Do You Do" to Sarah McLachlan's "Dear God", calling it "bold" and noting its "eerie reciting" of the Lord's Prayer.

"Don't Bother" (2005)
A 24-second sample of "Don't Bother" containing part of the chorus. On the rock-tinged song, Shakira refuses to ask for her former lover's sympathy after the end of their relationship and assures him that she will move on.

The first single, "Don't Bother", presents the final chapter of a relationship and the confusion that faces anyone in a break-up. It includes the lyrics, "For you I'd give up all I own and move to a communist country/If you came with me, of course/And I'd file my nails so they don't hurt you." She quickly follows with: "And after all I'm glad I am not your type/I promise you won't see me cry/So don't bother/I'll be fine, I'll be fine." For Shakira, "I think 'Don't Bother' has a lot of pain in it as a song, but also a lot of humor and sarcasm. Yes, it is a way of exorcising all of these feelings, a form of catharsis, getting rid of all of those emotions that torture us women at some point in our lives."

"Illegal" features a guitar solo by Mexican guitarist Carlos Santana, and features lyrics such as, "You said you would love me until you died/And as far as I know you're still alive", which were compared to Alanis Morissette's "You Oughta Know", according to Stephen Thomas Erlewine of AllMusic.

"I'd like to be the owner of the zipper on your jeans," she sings on the racy "Hey You", which was compared to the works of American rock band No Doubt, by Slant Magazine. Mariachi horns bump up against surf guitars in "Animal City", a don't-go-there warning against fame and fake friends, while bossa nova accents wind through "Something", one of only two tracks reprised from Fijación Oral, being called En Tus Pupilas on the first edition. "The Day and the Time" is on the first edition, with the title "Día Especial". Meanwhile, gypsy-caravan violin and marauder guitar complete "Your Embrace", a teardroppy, adult-contemporary ballad, whilst "Costume Makes the Clown" talks about her cheating on her guy, over battering-ram guitars. Shakira also dives into pulsating neo-disco on the closing track, "Timor", but in the form of a protest song.

== Critical reception ==
Professional ratings
Aggregate scores
| Source | Rating |
|---|---|
| Metacritic | 74/100 |
Review scores
| Source | Rating |
| AllMusic | 4/5 stars |
| Blender | 3/5 stars |
| Boston Herald | 3/4 stars |
| Entertainment Weekly | B− |
| The Guardian | 4/5 stars |
| Los Angeles Times | 3/4 stars |
| PopMatters | 9/10 |
| Rolling Stone | 3/5 stars |
| Slant | 3/5 stars |
| Stylus | B− |

At Metacritic, which assigns a normalized rating out of 100 to reviews from mainstream critics, "Oral Fixation" received an average score of 74 based on 15 reviews, indicating "generally favorable reviews". Stephen Thomas Erlewine of Allmusic gave the album a rating of 4 stars (out of 5), calling it "a deadly serious, ambitious pop/rock album, most assuredly not frivolous dance-pop, [...] it's pop, but it's unconventional". Erlewine also wrote that Oral Fixation "is not only a markedly different album from Fijación Oral, but from every other record in her catalog -- or, most importantly, from any other pop album in 2005." Matt Cibula of PopMatters agreed, writing that Oral Fixation is "the best pop record of the year". Alexis Petridis of The Guardian wrote that "Oral Fixation is the sound of an utterly unique voice in a uniform world." Agustin Gurza of the Los Angeles Times wrote the album "is a stronger work as a whole, with sharper edges and darker undertones," praising its music, writing that "this work stands on its own, squarely within the mainstream of U.S. pop and rock with a lot less Latin flavor."

David Browne of Entertainment Weekly gave the album a B- rating, writing that, "Although Oral Fixation is hardly the first time a Latina act has aimed straight for the middle of the North American road and nearly lost control of the wheel in the process, it's among the most disappointing. For all the musical ingredients at her disposal, Shakira winds up with a relatively bland dish." Sal Cinquemani of Slant Magazine wrote that the weakest part in some songs on the album are "the main(stream) hook, an attempt at radio-accessibility that white-washes the personality that sets Shakira apart from her competition." Barry Walters of Rolling Stone acknowledged that, "Occasionally clumsy but most often clever, Shakira's English lyrics and performances still lack the confidence of her Spanish tracks, yet Oral Fixation manages to maintain the musical credibility that Fijacion Oral won back." Edward Oculicz of Stylus Magazine concluded that, "Oral Fixation Volume 2 strikes a good balance between the creative audacity of its more extreme songs, all of which work as good pop, and the filler, which is well crafted and catchy."

== Commercial performance ==
In Austria, Oral Fixation, Vol. 2 entered the Ö3 Austria Top 40 albums chart at number seven and began descending the albums chart during the following 13 weeks when it felt out of the chart. Oral Fixation, Vol. 2 re-entered the albums chart at number 59 in the first week of April 2006, and reached its peak position of number six, ten weeks later where it remained for two consecutive weeks and spent four weeks in the top ten and began descending on the albums chart, spending a total of 45 weeks in the chart. The album was certified platinum by the IFPI Austria for sales over 30,000 copies. In the Dutch-speaking Flanders region of Belgium, it peaked at number eight and spent 51 weeks in the chart. It peaked at number 12 in the French-speaking Wallonia region of the country, spending 48 weeks in the chart. The album was certified Gold in Belgium for sales of 25,000 shipped copies. In Denmark, the new edition of the album debuted at number thirty-seven in the week of April 21, 2006 and reached number one eight weeks later aided by the success of the single "Hips Don't Lie", where it remained for five non-consecutive weeks and spent 25 weeks in the chart. It was certified Gold by the IFPI Danmark for sales of 20,000 copies based on sales certifications. In Finland, Oral Fixation, Vol. 2 had some commercial troubles to replicate the same success of Laundry Service (2002) her previous English-language album. It debuted at number at number thirty-one and descended to number thirty-nine the next week, and felt out of the chart for one week and re-entered the albums chart at number thirty-five the following week where it spent five weeks in the chart and reached number twenty-nine. It made its second re-entry at number twenty-one and reached its peak position of number 13 for two consecutive weeks, spending 19 weeks in the chart. By the end of 2007, it was certified Gold for sales of 15,085 copies. In France, Oral Fixation, Vol. 2 peaked at number eight in May 2006. It spent 65 weeks in the chart and was certified platinum by Syndicat national de l'édition phonographique (SNEP) for sales over 200,000 copies. In Germany, peaked at number four on the Media Control chart and charted for 71 weeks. Bundesverband Musikindustrie (BVMI) certified Oral Fixation, Vol. 2 triple-gold in Germany for shipments of 300,000 units. Oral Fixation, Vol. 2 peaked at number six on the Italian Albums Chart. The album was the 18th best-selling album of 2006 in Italy and sold 130,000 copies according to Federazione Industria Musicale Italiana (FIMI). In Spain, Oral Fixation, Vol. 2 peaked at number three. The album was certified Platinum for by PROMUSICAE for sales over 80,000 copies. In Sweden, Oral Fixation, Vol. 2 peaked at number four. The album was certified gold by Swedish Recording Industry Association (GLF). In Switzerland, Oral Fixation, Vol. 2 peaked at number three. The album was certified platinum by the IFPI Switzerland.

In the United States, Oral Fixation, Vol. 2 debuted at number 5 on the Billboard 200 with first-week sales of 128,000 copies. The album rebounded in the Billboard 200 albums chart with the success of "Hips Don't Lie" from the album reissue, the album moved from number 98 to number 6 on the week of April 15, 2006, selling 81,000 copies. By 2007, the album sold over 1.7 million units in the country. The album was certified Platinum by the RIAA in the United States. Shakira additionally received 18 Platinum certifications for the sales of Oral Fixation, Vol. 2 in the following countries: Argentina, Austria, Canada, Chile, Germany, Greece, Hungary, India, Italy, Mexico, Norway, Peru, Portugal, Spain, Switzerland, United States, United Kingdom, and her home country, Colombia. Oral Fixation, Vol. 2 was named the ninth best selling album of 2006 worldwide. In Canada, Oral Fixation, Vol. 2 debuted and peaked at number three and spent 15 weeks in the chart. It was certified double-platinum by Music Canada for sales of 200,000 copies.

In the United Kingdom, Oral Fixation, Vol. 2 peaked at number twelve. Oral Fixation, Vol. 2 spent a total of 30 weeks on the chart and was certified platinum by the British Phonographic Industry (BPI) for sales of over 300,000 copies.

== Promotion ==
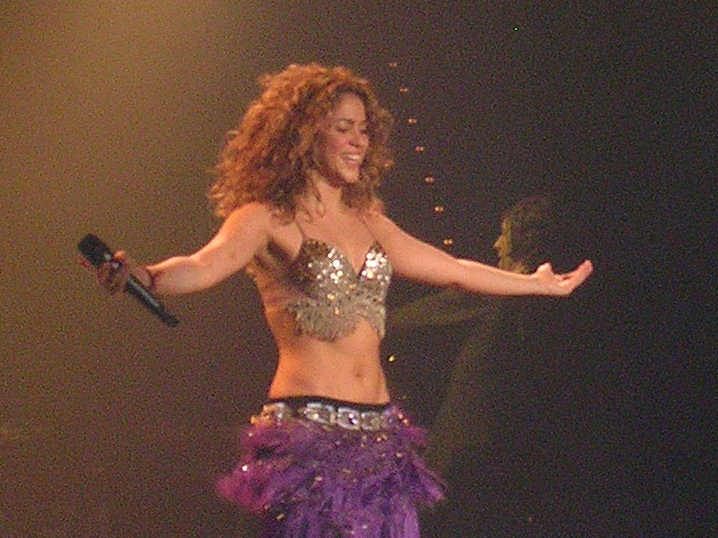
Shakira performing during the Oral Fixation Tour, 2006

Shakira first performance of "Don't Bother" took place at the Nordic Music Awards in Copenhagen, Denmark on October 29, 2005. Shakira performed "Hey You", "Costumes Makes the Clown", "Illegal" and "Don't Bother" from Oral Fixation, Vol. 2 at the Hackney Empire in Hackney, England, along with "La Tortura", "Obtener Un Sí" and "Underneath Your Clothes". On November 3, 2005, she appeared and performed "Don't Bother" at the 2005 MTV Europe Music Awards in Lisbon, Portugal on November 3, 2005, where she also received the award for "Best Female" for the first time in her career. Shakira continued with the promotion of "Don't Bother" at Wetten, dass..? in Manheim, Germany on November 5, 2005; at the MTV Studios in London on November 8, 2005 and at Jensen!, in the Netherlands, alongside "Hey You" and "La Tortura" on November 15 as her latest appearance or performance in Europe.

Shakira performed "Don't Bother", "Hey You" and "La Tortura" at Times Square in New York City, on November 21, 2005. She performed "Don't Bother" at the Good Morning America, alongside "Illegal" on December 2, 2005. On December 6, 2005, Shakira appeared at KIIS-FM's Jingle Ball at the Shrine Auditorium in Los Angeles, where she performed "Illegal", "Costume Makes the Clown", "Don't Bother", "Hey You", "Underneath Your Clothes" and "La Tortura". On December 9, 2005, Shakira performed "Día de Enero", "Las de La Intuición", "No", "Don't Bother", "La Tortura" and "Obtener Un Sí" at an unknown venue in New York City. Shakira became the musical guest of NBC's sitcom Saturday Night Live (SNL) on December 10, 2005, performing "Don't Bother" and "La Tortura". Shakira performed "Don't Bother" at Late Show with David Letterman on December 15. Shakira also took part of the Z100 Jingle Ball in New York City on December 16 and Y100 Jingle Ball in Sunrise, Florida on December 17, where she performed "La Tortura", "Underneath Your Clothes", "Hey You" and "Don't Bother" in both concerts. She culminated the year performing "Don't Bother" at the MTV's New Year's Eve at the MTV Studios in Times Square on December 31, 2005.

Shakira continued with promotion of "Don't Bother" as she performed it at the NRJ Music Awards of 2006 in Cannes, France on January 21. She also performed at the Top of the Pops and CD:UK on January 29 and February 4, 2006, respectively. Shakira took part of the Festival della Canzone Italiana di Sanremo performing "Don't Bother" on February 4, 2006, and continued with performances of the song at the ECHO Awards at the Estrel Comvention Center in Berlin, Germany on March 12.

Shakira performed her newest single "Hips Don't Lie" for the first time at American Idol in Los Angeles on March 29, 2006 for the first time in the American mainstreamTV. She performed the Spanish-language of the song titled "Será Será (Las Caderas No Mienten)" at the Latin Billboard Music Awards at the Hard Rock Live in Hollywood, Florida. She also performed her first headlining performance at Rock in Rio Lisboa 2006 on May 26, 2006.

Shakira and Wyclef Jean performed "Hips Don't Lie" at the short ceremony preceding the final FIFA World Cup game in Berlin, Germany on July 9, 2006, to worldwide TV audiences of over 700 million people. On August 31, 2006, Shakira and Wyclef Jean performed the song at the 2006 MTV Video Music Awards held at the Radio City Music Hall in New York City. Shakira was given dancing lessons for the performance of the song by Indian choreographer Farah Khan. Shakira and Wyclef Jean also performed the song on the 49th Grammy Awards in 2007., becoming the first time that Shakira performed at the Grammy Awards.

To further promote Fijación Oral, Vol. 1 and Oral Fixation, Vol. 2, Shakira embarked on the Oral Fixation Tour. It was launched on 14 June 2006, at the Feria De Muestras in Zaragoza, Spain. With the assistance of the Creative Artists Agency, she visited ninety-four cities and performed forty-one shows across five continents. The tour concluded on 9 July 2007, at the Turkcell Kuruçeşme Arena in Istanbul, Turkey. It grossed over $42 million in North and Latin America, and grossed $100 million worldwide. The set list primarily consisted of Spanish-language tracks, and additionally included earlier singles from Shakira's albums Pies Descalzos (1996), Dónde Están los Ladrones? (1998), and Laundry Service (2001).

In November 2007, Epic Records released the Oral Fixation Tour live album, filmed during a show in Miami, Florida in December 2006. Robert Silva from About.com provided a positive review, describing the recording as a "very entertaining and lively performance"; he expressed an additional interest in the bonus behind-the-scenes footage. William Ruhlmann from Allmusic shared a similar sentiment, complimenting her vocals and dancing abilities.

== Singles ==
The lead single, "Don't Bother", was released on 4 October 2005. The song received mixed reviews from music critics, who were ambivalent towards its production and songwriting. Commercially, the song was a moderate success, reaching the top ten in Austria, Germany, Italy, Switzerland and UK, while it only peaked at number 42 in the US, reaching a lower peak than "La Tortura", the lead single of Fijación Oral.

After the moderate success of "Don't Bother" and of the album, her label Epic Records asked Wyclef Jean, in early 2006, to remake his song "Dance Like This" with Shakira, attempting to revive sales of the album. After that, "Hips Don't Lie" was released as the second single from the album (first from the reissue) on 28 February 2006. The song received positive reviews from critics, while it gained 6 awards. Commercially, the single proved to be more successful than "Don't Bother", peaking at number one in more than 13 countries, including Australia, France, Ireland, the UK and the US, becoming her most successful single to date.

The third (second from the original standard edition) and final single, "Illegal", was released on 14 November 2006. The song received favorable reviews from music critics, due to the inclusion of Carlos Santana on it. However, the song didn't perform well on the charts, after the huge success of "Hips Don't Lie", only managing to peak inside the top ten in Austria, Italy and the Netherlands, while elsewhere it reached the top forty, including the UK. In the US, the song didn't enter the Billboard Hot 100 chart.

== Track listing ==
All lyrics are written by Shakira, except where noted.

Oral Fixation, Vol. 2 – original release
| No. | Title | Lyrics | Music | Producer(s) | Length |
|---|---|---|---|---|---|
| 1. | "How Do You Do" | | Shakira; Lauren Christy; Scott Spock; Graham Edwards | Shakira; Lester Mendez^{[a]}; Gustavo Cerati^{[b]}; The Matrix^{[c]} | 3:46 |
| 2. | "Don't Bother" | | Shakira; Christy; Spock; Edwards; Heather Reid; Leisha Hailey | Shakira; Mendez^{[a]}; Cerati^{[b]} | 4:18 |
| 3. | "Illegal" (featuring Carlos Santana) | | Shakira; Mendez | Shakira; Mendez^{[a]}; Gocho^{[b]} | 3:54 |
| 4. | "The Day and the Time" (featuring Gustavo Cerati) | Shakira; Pedro Aznar | Shakira; Cerati; Luis F. Ochoa | Shakira; Cerati^{[a]} | 4:23 |
| 5. | "Animal City" | | Shakira; Ochoa | Shakira; Ochoa^{[a]} | 3:17 |
| 6. | "Dreams for Plans" | | Shakira; Brendan Buckley | Shakira; Mendez^{[a]} | 4:04 |
| 7. | "Hey You" | | Shakira; Tim Mitchell | Shakira; Mitchell^{[a]} | 4:11 |
| 8. | "Your Embrace" | | Shakira; Mitchell | Shakira; Mendez^{[a]} | 3:34 |
| 9. | "Costume Makes the Clown" | | Shakira; Buckley | Shakira; Mendez^{[a]} | 3:13 |
| 10. | "Something" | | Shakira; Ochoa | Shakira; Ochoa^{[a]} | 4:24 |
| 11. | "Timor" | | Shakira | Shakira; Mendez^{[a]} | 3:32 |
| Total length: | | | | | 42:36 |

Oral Fixation, Vol. 2 – 2006 reissue
| No. | Title | Lyrics | Music | Producer(s) | Length |
|---|---|---|---|---|---|
| 1. | "How Do You Do" | | Shakira; Christy; Spock; Edwards | Shakira; Mendez^{[a]}; Cerati^{[b]}; The Matrix^{[c]} | 3:47 |
| 2. | "Illegal" (featuring Carlos Santana) | | Shakira; Mendez | Shakira; Mendez^{[a]}; Gocho^{[b]} | 3:56 |
| 3. | "Hips Don't Lie" (featuring Wyclef Jean) | Shakira; Jean | Shakira; Jean; Jerry "Wonda" Duplessis; Omar Alfano; LaTravia Parker | Shakira; Jean; Duplessis | 3:40 |
| 4. | "Animal City" | | Shakira; Ochoa | Shakira; Ochoa^{[a]} | 3:18 |
| 5. | "Don't Bother" | | Shakira; Christy; Spock; Edwards; Reid; Hailey | Shakira; Mendez^{[a]}; Cerati^{[b]} | 4:19 |
| 6. | "The Day and the Time" (featuring Gustavo Cerati) (lyrics: Shakira, Aznar) | Shakira; Aznar | Shakira; Cerati; Ochoa | Shakira; Cerati^{[a]} | 4:25 |
| 7. | "Dreams for Plans" | | Shakira; Buckley | Shakira; Mendez^{[a]} | 4:04 |
| 8. | "Hey You" | | Shakira; Mitchell | Shakira; Mitchell^{[a]} | 4:11 |
| 9. | "Your Embrace" | | Shakira; Mitchell | Shakira; Mendez^{[a]} | 3:34 |
| 10. | "Costume Makes the Clown" | | Shakira; Buckley | Shakira; Mendez^{[a]} | 3:13 |
| 11. | "Something" | | Shakira; Ochoa | Shakira; Ochoa^{[a]} | 4:24 |
| 12. | "Timor" | | Shakira | Shakira; Mendez^{[a]} | 3:33 |
| 13. | "La Tortura" (alternate version) (featuring Alejandro Sanz) | | Shakira; Ochoa | Shakira; Mendez^{[a]}; Gocho^{[b]} | 3:37 |
| Total length: | | | | | 50:01 |

Oral Fixation, Vol. 2 – 2006 reissue (Japanese limited edition bonus track)
| No. | Title | Music | Producer(s) | Length |
|---|---|---|---|---|
| 14. | "Don't Bother" (Jrsnchz radio mix) | Shakira; Christy; Spock; Edwards; Reid; Hailey | Shakira; Junior Sanchez^{[b]}; Mendez^{[a]}; Cerati^{[b]} | 4:24 |

Oral Fixation, Vol. 2 – 2006 reissue (Japanese limited edition bonus DVD)
| No. | Title | Length |
|---|---|---|
| 1. | "Don't Bother" (music video) |
| 2. | "Hips Don't Lie" (music video) (featuring Wyclef Jean) |

Oral Fixation, Vol. 2 – 2006 reissue (Latin America and Spain edition)
| No. | Title | Lyrics | Music | Producer(s) | Length |
|---|---|---|---|---|---|
| 13. | "Hips Don't Lie" (en español) (featuring Wyclef Jean) | Shakira; Jean | Shakira; Jean; Duplessis; Alfano; Parker | Shakira; Jean; Duplessis | 3:40 |

Oral Fixation, Vol. 2 – 2006 reissue (UK edition)
| No. | Title | Music | Producer(s) | Length |
|---|---|---|---|---|
| 13. | "Don't Bother" (Jrsnchz radio mix) | Shakira; Christy; Spock; Edwards; Reid; Hailey | Shakira; Sanchez^{[b]}; Mendez^{[a]}; Cerati^{[b]} | 4:24 |

Oral Fixation, Vol. 2 – 20th anniversary edition (bonus tracks)
| No. | Title | Lyrics | Music | Producer(s) | Length |
|---|---|---|---|---|---|
| 14. | "Hips Don't Lie" (en español) (featuring Wyclef Jean) | Shakira; Jean | Shakira; Jean; Duplessis; Alfano; Parker | Shakira; Jean; Duplessis | 3:40 |
| 15. | "Don't Bother" (Jrsnchz radio mix) | | Shakira; Christy; Spock; Edwards; Reid; Hailey | Shakira; Sanchez^{[b]}; Mendez^{[a]}; Cerati^{[b]} | 4:24 |
| 16. | "Illegal" (Ali Dee radio mix) | | Shakira; Mendez | Shakira; Ali Dee Theodore^{[b]}; Mendez^{[a]}; Zach Danziger^{[b]} | 3:47 |

Notes

- ^{^a} signifies an assistant producer
- ^{^b} signifies an additional producer
- ^{^c} signifies a pre-producer

== Charts ==
=== Weekly charts ===
| Chart (2005–06) | Peak position |
|---|---|
| Argentine Albums (CAPIF) | 4 |
| Australian Albums (ARIA) | 9 |
| Austrian Albums (Ö3 Austria) | 6 |
| Belgian Albums (Ultratop Flanders) | 8 |
| Belgian Albums (Ultratop Wallonia) | 12 |
| Canadian Albums (Billboard) | 3 |
| Croatian International Albums (HDU) | 1 |
| Danish Albums (Hitlisten) | 1 |
| Dutch Albums (Album Top 100) | 2 |
| Finnish Albums (Suomen virallinen lista) | 13 |
| French Albums (SNEP) | 8 |
| German Albums (Offizielle Top 100) | 4 |
| Hungarian Albums (MAHASZ) | 5 |
| Italian Albums (FIMI) | 6 |
| Japanese Albums (Oricon) | 69 |
| Mexican Albums (AMPROFON) | 1 |
| Norwegian Albums (VG-lista) | 2 |
| Portuguese Albums (AFP) | 2 |
| South African Albums (RISA) | 1 |
| Spanish Albums (Promusicae) | 3 |
| Swedish Albums (Sverigetopplistan) | 4 |
| Swiss Albums (Schweizer Hitparade) | 3 |
| Taiwanese Albums (Five Music) | 10 |
| UK Albums (OCC) | 12 |
| US Billboard 200 | 5 |

| Chart (2020) | Peak position |
|---|---|
| US Billboard 200 | 166 |

=== Year-end charts ===
| Chart (2005) | Position |
|---|---|
| Mexican Albums (AMPROFON) | 89 |

| Chart (2006) | Position |
|---|---|
| Australian Albums (ARIA) | 93 |
| Austrian Albums (Ö3 Austria) | 21 |
| Belgian Albums (Ultratop Flanders) | 28 |
| Belgian Albums (Ultratop Wallonia) | 46 |
| Dutch Albums (Album Top 100) | 19 |
| European Hot 100 Albums (Billboard) | 7 |
| French Albums (SNEP) | 52 |
| German Albums (Offizielle Top 100) | 12 |
| Greek Albums (IFPI) | 19 |
| Greek Foreign Albums (IFPI) | 2 |
| Mexican Albums (AMPROFON) | 5 |
| South African Albums (RISA) | 7 |
| Spanish Albums (PROMUSICAE) | 13 |
| Swedish Albums (Sverigetopplistan) | 20 |
| Swiss Albums (Schweizer Hitparade) | 15 |
| UK Albums (OCC) | 70 |
| US Billboard 200 | 23 |
| Worldwide Albums (IFPI) | 40 |

== Certifications and sales ==
| Region | Certification | Certified units/sales |
|---|---|---|
| Argentina (CAPIF) | Platinum | 40,000^{^} |
| Australia (ARIA) | Gold | 35,000^{^} |
| Austria (IFPI Austria) | Platinum | 30,000^{*} |
| Belgium (BRMA) | Gold | 25,000^{*} |
| Canada (Music Canada) | 3× Platinum | 300,000^{‡} |
| Colombia Physical sales | 2× Platinum | |
| Colombia Digital streams | Gold | |
| Chile | 2× Platinum | |
| Denmark (IFPI Danmark) | Gold | 20,000^{^} |
| Finland (Musiikkituottajat) | Gold | 15,085 |
| France (SNEP) | Platinum | 200,000^{*} |
| Germany (BVMI) | 2× Platinum | 400,000^{‡} |
| Greece (IFPI Greece) | Platinum | 20,000^{^} |
| Hungary (MAHASZ) | Platinum | 10,000^{^} |
| India | Gold | 80,000 |
| Ireland (IRMA) | 2× Platinum | 30,000^{^} |
| Italy | Gold | |
| Japan (Oricon Charts) | — | 30,416 |
| Mexico (AMPROFON) | 2× Platinum+Gold | 250,000^{^} |
| Netherlands (NVPI) | Platinum | 80,000^{^} |
| Norway | Gold | |
| New Zealand (RMNZ) | Platinum | 15,000^{‡} |
| Portugal (AFP) | Platinum | 20,000^{^} |
| Romania | Platinum | |
| Russia (NFPF) | 2× Platinum | 40,000^{*} |
| Spain (Promusicae) | Platinum | 80,000^{^} |
| Sweden (GLF) | Gold | 30,000^{^} |
| Switzerland (IFPI Switzerland) | Platinum | 40,000^{^} |
| United Kingdom (BPI) | Platinum | 404,000 |
| United States (RIAA) | 3× Platinum | 3,000,000^{‡} |
Summaries
| Europe (IFPI) | Platinum | 1,000,000^{*} |
^{*} Sales figures based on certification alone.^{^} Shipments figures based on certification alone.^{‡} Sales+streaming figures based on certification alone.
