= Oral Fixation Tour =

2006–07 concert tour by Shakira

- Tour by Shakira
- Promotional poster for the 2006 tour
- Location: Africa; Asia; Europe; North America; South America
- Associated albums: Fijación Oral, Vol. 1; Oral Fixation, Vol. 2
- Start date: 14 June 2006
- End date: 23 December 2007
- No. of shows: 121
- Box office: $100 million

Shakira concert chronology
- Tour of the Mongoose (2002–2003); Oral Fixation Tour (2006–2007); The Sun Comes Out World Tour (2010–2011)

Oral Fixation Tour (known as Tour Fijación Oral in Hispanophone countries) was the fourth concert tour by Colombian singer Shakira. It was launched in support of her sixth and seventh studio albums Fijación Oral, Vol. 1 (2005). and Oral Fixation, Vol. 2 (2005). It began on 14 June 2006 at the Feria De Muestras in Zaragoza, Spain. With assistance from the Creative Artists Agency, she visited twenty-seven cities and performed forty-one shows across five continents. The tour was additionally sponsored by Spanish automobile manufacturer SEAT, with whom Shakira also collaborated to support her Pies Descalzos Foundation. The tour concluded on 23 December 2007 in Tbilisi, Georgia.

It was the 15th highest-grossing concert tour of 2006 grossing over $58.6 million, although this figure only includes 41 shows in that year. The total tour grossed over $100 million in both years. It's her most extensive tour to date. She was the first female artist from her generation to have a tour grossing over 100 million dollars overall.

== Background ==
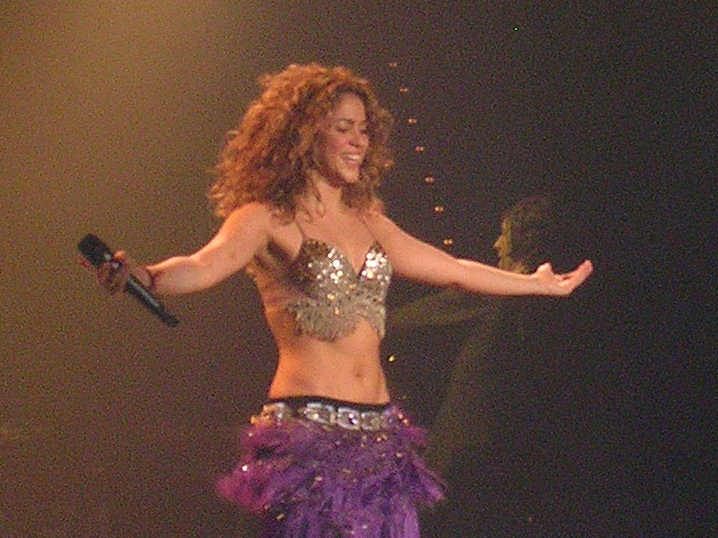
Shakira performing "Suerte" in A Coruña, Spain, in 2006.

The wardrobe Shakira wore on the concert was designed by Shakira and designer Roberto Cavalli. The stage was designed by Shakira and Spanish visual artist Jaume de Laiguana. She commented about the staging: "[It] will revolve around the art, dance and energy of rock and roll". On 3 February 2007, Shakira was scheduled to appear in the Netherlands. While a full stadium – 39,000 people – were waiting for Shakira, her official management announced that the show had to be rescheduled to March 17, 2007. Shakira was ill and had been advised to rest her voice. Shakira gave her manager the following letter to pass out to the crowd:

"I am very sad I cannot perform tonight. Holland is one of my favorite places on earth and I have been looking forward to doing this show for a long time. I promise I will make it up to you when I come back in March to give you the concert that the Dutch people deserve. Thanks for your understanding. All my love, Shakira."

== Commercial reception ==
The tour broke several records:

- The 25 March 2007 concert in Mumbai, Maharashtra, India was attended by at least 20,000 people, including numerous Indian celebrities; among them were superstars Aishwarya Rai and Shilpa Shetty. Shakira’s show was the second most expensive concert in Indian history and one of the biggest events in India by any international artist.
- During a free show on 27 May 2007 at Mexico City's Zócalo, 210k fans showed-up to see Shakira, giving her the distinction of having the biggest live audience in modern Mexican music history. The previous record was held by Mexican rock group Café Tacuba.
- In Tbilisi, Georgia, Shakira became the first international artist to hold a concert in the country. The show attracted more than 350,000 attendees which is a record she still holds.
- In Athens, Greece, Shakira was the first female singer to perform at the Olympic Stadium, with an audience of over 40k people.
- In Timiosara, Romania, her show for 30k people at Stadionul Dan Păltinișanu was the first, and only, show by a female artist at that venue, ever, until 2017.
- At Miami's American Airlines Arena, Shakira holds the record of having the most consecutive shows (five) at the venue for a female artist on a single tour.
- In Cairo, Egypt, over 100,000 people joined Shakira for her concert at the Giza Plateau. This set the record of having the highest attendance of any Egyptian and African concert in history. This record is also confirmed by Guinness World Record as one of the most attended tickets concerts in history.
- At Mexico City's Palacio de los Deportes, Shakira performed eight nights back-to-back, gaining the record of the most shows at the venue for a female artist.
- At Guayaquil, Ecuador’s Estadio Modelo Alberto Spencer Herrera, over 42k people attended, with Shakira being the first female performer at the stadium.
- At Santiago, Chile’s Movistar Arena, the first show was quickly sold-out, with a second show later scheduled for the National Stadium (which was completely sold-out, as well).
- Shakira played 15 shows in Spain, 10 in Germany and 21 shows in México, which broke the record of having the most shows within these three respective countries as a Latin American female artist.
- All of Shakira’s shows in the U.S. and Canada, from August 9 to September 26, 2006, were completely sold-out.

== Broadcast and recordings ==
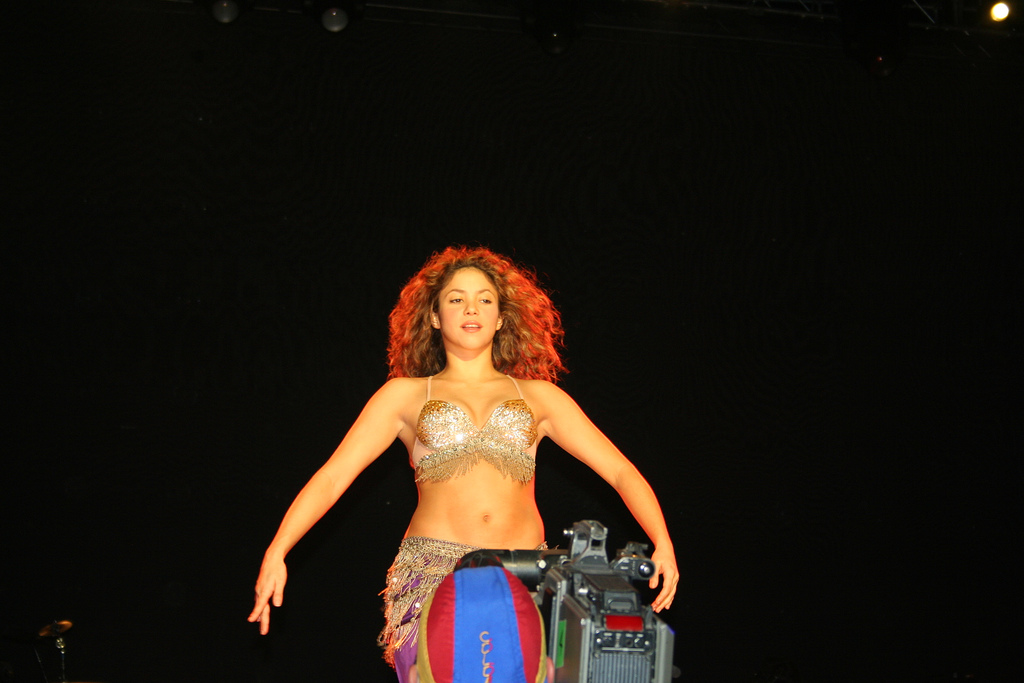
Shakira performing "Ojos asi" during the tour.

The shows in Miami, Florida and San Juan, Puerto Rico in December 2006 were filmed for a DVD release. Shakira had Alejandro Sanz as a guest and they performed together "La Tortura". Wyclef Jean was also a guest and performed "Hips Don't Lie" with Shakira. It was released under the title Oral Fixation Tour on 12 November 2007 worldwide. The audio was recorded and mixed in stereo and 5.1 by Gustavo Celis. The release was well received by critics, who commended Shakira's multi-instrumentalism. It was also well received commercially, peaking at number six on the US Top Music Videos chart, and has been certified Platinum by the Recording Industry Association of America (RIAA). The album quickly shot up the Mexican charts, peaking at number one for two non-consecutive weeks, and remained in the top 10 for over eleven weeks. The concert was also screened in theaters across the United States.

== Set list ==
The following set list is obtained from the August 9, 2006, concert in El Paso, Texas. It is not intended to represent all dates throughout the tour.

1. "A'atini Nay" (Intro)
2. "Estoy Aquí"
3. "Te Dejo Madrid"
4. "Don't Bother"
5. "Antología"
6. "Hey You"
7. "Inevitable"
8. "Si Te Vas"
9. "Obtener Un Sí"
10. "La Tortura"
11. "No"
12. "Whenever, Wherever"
13. "La Pared"
14. "Underneath Your Clothes"
15. "Pies Descalzos, Sueños Blancos"
16. "Ciega, Sordomuda"
17. "Ojos Así"
18. "Hips Don't Lie"

== Tour dates ==
Date	City	Country	Venue	Attendance	Revenue
Europe
June 14, 2006	Zaragoza	Spain	Feria De Muestras	13,298 / 17,100	$575,644
June 16, 2006	La Coruña	Spain	Instituto Municipal Coruña Espectáculos	10,000 / 10,000	$494,720
June 18, 2006	Gijón	Spain	Las Mestas Sports Complex	18,430 / 19,000	$708,501
June 20, 2006	León	Spain	Campo de Fútbol Antonio Amilivia	20,777 / 21,000	$488,243
June 22, 2006	Madrid	Spain	Las Ventas	33,202 / 33,202	$1,920,729
June 23, 2006	Madrid	Spain	Las Ventas	33,202 / 33,202	$1,920,729
June 25, 2006	Pamplona	Spain	Plaza de Toros de Pamplona	14,500 / 14,500	$690,444
June 28, 2006	Barcelona	Spain	Palau Sant Jordi	17,527 / 17,527	$926,977
June 30, 2006	Málaga	Spain	La Rosaleda Stadium	23,750 / 23,750	$1,028,950
July 1, 2006	Elche	Spain	Estadio Manuel Martínez Valero	27,500 / 27,500	$989,452
July 3, 2006	Las Palmas	Spain	Estadio Gran Canaria	33,000 / 33,000	$667,872
July 5, 2006	Santa Cruz	Spain	Estadio Heliodoro Rodríguez López	35,000 / 35,000	$667,872
July 14, 2006	Velika Gorica (Note: Promoted as Zagreb)	Croatia	Stadion Radnik	—N/a	—N/a
July 17, 2006	Timișoara	Romania	Stadionul Dan Păltinișanu	—N/a	—N/a
July 20, 2006	Athens	Greece	Olympic Stadium	—N/a	—N/a
July 22, 2006	Moscow	Russia	Red Square	—N/a	—N/a
North America
August 9, 2006	El Paso	United States	Don Haskins Center	8,718 / 8,718	$673,270
August 11, 2006	Phoenix	United States	US Airways Center	11,940 / 11,940	$860,378
August 12, 2006	Las Vegas	United States	Mandalay Bay Events Center	9,229 / 9,330	$746,737
August 15, 2006	Los Angeles	United States	Staples Center	14,723 / 14,967	$1,052,765
August 16, 2006	San Diego	United States	iPayOne Center	14,017 / 14,017	$1,149,880
August 18, 2006	Anaheim	United States	Arrowhead Pond of Anaheim	12,917 / 12,917	$1,011,617
August 19, 2006	San Jose	United States	HP Pavilion at San Jose	27,789 / 27,789	$1,619,753
August 21, 2006	San Jose	United States	HP Pavilion at San Jose	27,789 / 27,789	$1,619,753
August 25, 2006	Chicago	United States	United Center	15,460 / 15,460	$1,142,602
August 27, 2006	Toronto	Canada	Air Canada Centre	14,021 / 15,445	$919,497
August 29, 2006	Washington, D.C.	United States	Verizon Center	14,379 / 14,379	$1,114,515
September 1, 2006	Atlantic City	United States	Mark G. Etess Arena	10,056 / 10,475	$715,890
September 2, 2006	Atlantic City	United States	Mark G. Etess Arena	10,056 / 10,475	$715,890
September 4, 2006	Uncasville	United States	Mohegan Sun Arena	7,646 / 7,771	$650,560
September 5, 2006	Boston	United States	TD Banknorth Garden	10,735 / 13,068	$748,649
September 7, 2006	New York City	United States	Madison Square Garden	31,035 / 31,035	$2,546,264
September 8, 2006	New York City	United States	Madison Square Garden	31,035 / 31,035	$2,546,264
September 12, 2006	Atlanta	United States	Philips Arena	11,986 / 11,986	$787,197
September 13, 2006	Orlando	United States	TD Waterhouse Centre	12,567 / 12,581	$767,852
September 15, 2006	Miami	United States	American Airlines Arena	72,186 / 72,186 (Note: The score data is combined from the shows held at the American Airlines Arensa on September 15–16 and December 7–9, 2006.)	$6,927,124
September 16, 2006	Miami	United States	American Airlines Arena	72,186 / 72,186	$6,927,124
September 19, 2006	Houston	United States	Toyota Center	14,108 / 14,108	$963,974
September 20, 2006	Corpus Christi	United States	American Bank Center Arena	8,653 / 8,653	$620,769
September 22, 2006	San Antonio	United States	AT&T Center	15,345 / 15,345	$966,237
September 23, 2006	Dallas	United States	American Airlines Center	14,866 / 14,866	$1,006,985
September 25, 2006	Hidalgo	United States	Dodge Arena	12,790 / 12,790 (100%)	$1,010,194
September 26, 2006	Hidalgo	United States	Dodge Arena	12,790 / 12,790 (100%)	$1,010,194
September 30, 2006	Mexico City	Mexico	Palacio de los Deportes	112,677 / 137,000	$7,934,021
October 1, 2006	Mexico City	Mexico	Palacio de los Deportes	112,677 / 137,000	$7,934,021
October 3, 2006	Mexico City	Mexico	Palacio de los Deportes	112,677 / 137,000	$7,934,021
October 4, 2006	Mexico City	Mexico	Palacio de los Deportes	112,677 / 137,000	$7,934,021
October 7, 2006	Mexico City	Mexico	Palacio de los Deportes	112,677 / 137,000	$7,934,021
October 8, 2006	Mexico City	Mexico	Palacio de los Deportes	112,677 / 137,000	$7,934,021
October 10, 2006	Mexico City	Mexico	Palacio de los Deportes	112,677 / 137,000	$7,934,021
October 11, 2006	Mexico City	Mexico	Palacio de los Deportes	112,677 / 137,000	$7,934,021
October 13, 2006	Monterrey	Mexico	Estadio Universitario	26,750 / 26,750	$1,433,256
October 15, 2006	Guadalajara	Mexico	Arena VFG	18,357 / 18,357	$1,334,886
November 4, 2006	Guatemala City	Guatemala	Estadio Mateo Flores	—N/a	—N/a
November 6, 2006	San Salvador	El Salvador	Estadio Jorge "Mágico" González	—N/a	—N/a
November 9, 2006	Panama City	Panama	Figali Convention Center	—N/a	—N/a
South America
November 11, 2006	Caracas	Venezuela	Generalissimo Francisco de Miranda Air Base	32,382 / 35,000	$1,430,746
November 15, 2006	Barranquilla	Colombia	Estadio Metropolitano	—N/a	—N/a
November 17, 2006	Bogotá	Colombia	Simón Bolívar Park	—N/a	—N/a
November 19, 2006	Cali	Colombia	Estadio Olímpico de Cali	—N/a	—N/a
November 21, 2006	Santiago	Chile	Movistar Arena	—N/a	—N/a
November 22, 2006	Santiago	Chile	Estadio Nacional	—N/a	—N/a
November 24, 2006	Buenos Aires	Argentina	Estadio Vélez Sársfield	—N/a	—N/a
November 25, 2006	Buenos Aires	Argentina	Estadio Vélez Sársfield	—N/a	—N/a
November 28, 2006	Lima	Peru	Hipódromo de Monterrico	—N/a	—N/a
November 30, 2006	Guayaquil	Ecuador	Estadio Modelo Alberto Spencer Herrera	—N/a	—N/a
December 2, 2006	Quito	Ecuador	Coliseo General Rumiñahui	—N/a	—N/a
North America
December 7, 2006	Miami	United States	American Airlines Arena		
December 8, 2006	Miami	United States	American Airlines Arena		
December 9, 2006	Miami	United States	American Airlines Arena		
December 13, 2006	San Juan	Puerto Rico	José Miguel Agrelot Coliseum	22,258 / 34,563	$2,688,203
December 15, 2006	San Juan	Puerto Rico	José Miguel Agrelot Coliseum	22,258 / 34,563	$2,688,203
December 16, 2006	San Juan	Puerto Rico	José Miguel Agrelot Coliseum	22,258 / 34,563	$2,688,203
December 19, 2006	Santo Domingo	Dominican Republic	Estadio Félix Sánchez	—N/a	—N/a
Europe
January 25, 2007	Hamburg	Germany	Color Line Arena	—N/a	—N/a
January 26, 2007	Berlin	Germany	Max-Schmeling-Halle	—N/a	—N/a
January 28, 2007	Antwerp	Belgium	Sportpaleis	16,531 / 16,691	$978,816
January 31, 2007	Hanover	Germany	TUI Arena	—N/a	—N/a
February 1, 2007	Mannheim	Germany	SAP Arena	—N/a	—N/a
February 16, 2007	Paris	France	Palais omnisports de Paris-Bercy	—N/a	—N/a
February 18, 2007	Munich	Germany	Olympiahalle	—N/a	—N/a
February 19, 2007	Munich	Germany	Olympiahalle	—N/a	—N/a
February 21, 2007	Zürich	Switzerland	Hallenstadion	—N/a	—N/a
February 22, 2007	Zürich	Switzerland	Hallenstadion	—N/a	—N/a
February 25, 2007	Stuttgart	Germany	Schleyerhalle	—N/a	—N/a
February 27, 2007	Milan	Italy	Datch Forum	—N/a	—N/a
March 2, 2007	Leipzig	Germany	Arena Leipzig	—N/a	—N/a
March 3, 2007	Prague	Czech Republic	Sazka Arena	—N/a	—N/a
March 5, 2007	Budapest	Hungary	Budapest Sports Arena	—N/a	—N/a
March 6, 2007	Vienna	Austria	Wiener Stadthalle	—N/a	—N/a
March 9, 2007	Aalborg	Denmark	Gigantium	8,298 / 8,298	$714,000
March 11, 2007	Oslo	Norway	Oslo Spektrum	8,805 / 9,112	$702,349
March 12, 2007	Stockholm	Sweden	Stockholm Globe Arena	12,116 / 12,554	$861,304
March 14, 2007	Helsinki	Finland	Hartwall Arena	9,959 / 9,994	$882,863
March 17, 2007 (Note: The 17 March 2007 concert in Arnhem was originally scheduled for 3 February 2007, but was postponed because Shakira suffered an acute throat infection .)	Arnhem	Netherlands	GelreDome	—N/a	—N/a
March 18, 2007	London	United Kingdom	Wembley Arena	11,592 / 11,592	$610,412
March 21, 2007 (Note: The 21 March 2007 concert in Oberhausen was originally scheduled for 5 February 2007, but was postponed because Shakira suffered an acute throat infection .)	Oberhausen	Germany	König Pilsener Arena	—N/a	—N/a
Asia
March 23, 2007	Dubai	United Arab Emirates	Dubai Autodrome	—N/a	—N/a
March 25, 2007	Mumbai	India	MMRDA Grounds	—N/a	—N/a
Africa
March 28, 2007	Cairo	Egypt	Giza Plateau	—N/a	—N/a
Europe
March 30, 2007	Granada	Spain	Plaza de Toros de Granada	10,500 / 10,500	$673,349
March 31, 2007	Torrevieja	Spain	Parque Antonio Soria	16,073 / 25,000	$858,948
April 2, 2007	Santander	Spain	Palacio de Deportes de Santander	6,950 / 6,950	$371,411
April 4, 2007	Lisbon	Portugal	Pavilhão Atlântico	—N/a	—N/a
April 8, 2007 (Note: The 8 April 2007 concert in Cologne was originally scheduled for 6 February 2007, but was postponed because Shakira suffered an acute throat infection .)	Cologne	Germany	Kölnarena	—N/a	—N/a
North America
May 9, 2007	Culiacán	Mexico	Estadio General Ángel Flores	15,347 / 17,571	$1,043,697
May 11, 2007	Aguascalientes	Mexico	Estadio Victoria	20,814 / 25,038	$1,216,311
May 13, 2007	Mexico City	Mexico	Foro Sol	48,491 / 52,502	$1,425,847
May 16, 2007	Querétaro	Mexico	Estadio Corregidora	24,844 / 31,924	$1,403,692
May 18, 2007	Veracruz	Mexico	Estadio Luis de la Fuente	24,375 / 25,797	$1,043,697
May 20, 2007	Puebla	Mexico	Universidad de las Américas Puebla	22,184 / 24,353 (91%)	$1,391,862
May 23, 2007	Chihuahua	Mexico	Estadio Universidad de Chihuahua	17,961 / 21,000 (86%)	$1,218,573
May 24, 2007	Torreón	Mexico	Estadio Revolución	13,586 / 14,144	$849,815
May 26, 2007	San Luis Potosí	Mexico	Estadio Alfonso Lastras Ramírez	17,770 / 20,426	$1,049,985
May 27, 2007	Mexico City	Mexico	Zócalo	210,000	—N/a
May 30, 2007	Monterrey	Mexico	Auditorio Coca-Cola	16,591 / 16,884	$878,377
Europe
July 9, 2007	Istanbul	Turkey	Turkcell Kuruçeşme Arena	—N/a	—N/a
Europe
December 23, 2007	Tbilisi	Georgia	European Square	—N/a	—N/a
Total				473,717 / 564,091 (84%)	$36,349,265

=== Cancelled shows ===
Date	City	Country	Venue
August 22, 2006	Denver	United States	Pepsi Center
November 8, 2006	Managua	Nicaragua	Nicaragua National Football Stadium
July 11, 2007	Beiteddine	Lebanon	Beiteddine Palace

== See also ==
- List of highest-grossing concert tours by Latin artists
