= How Do You Do (Shakira song) =

Song by Shakira

from the album Oral Fixation, Vol. 2
- Language: English; Latin; Arabic; Hebrew
- Released: 28 November 2005
- Studio: Criteria Studios (Miami, FL)
- Genre: Rock
- Length: 3:46
- Label: Epic Records
- Songwriters: Shakira, Lauren Christy, Scott Spock, Graham Edwards
- Producers: Shakira, Rick Rubin (executive producer), Lester Mendez (co-producer), Gustavo Cerati (additional producer), The Matrix (pre-production)

"How Do You Do" is a rock song by the Colombian singer-songwriter Shakira featured as the first track on her seventh studio album Oral Fixation, Vol. 2. Created by Shakira and the production trio The Matrix, the song incorporates religious themes in forms of Gregorian chants, a recitation of the Lord's Prayer, and lyrics critical of religion. The lyrical content resulted in Sony Music, the owner of the album's publishing rights, not releasing the album at all in many countries in the Middle East, and releasing it without the song "How Do You Do" in GCC countries and Lebanon.

== Background and release ==
"How Do You Do" was released on 28 November 2005 as the first track on Shakira's seventh studio album Oral Fixation Vol. 2. The album's cover features a semi-nude photograph of her, posed like Eve beside a tree of knowledge, with a baby reaching for the forbidden fruit she holds; alluding to the religious thematic of the album. The cover art was censored in GCC countries with Shakira's body covered by more leaves.

== Composition ==
"How Do You Do" is a rock song with the instrumental featuring modern pop rock structures and riffs and a staccato guitar solo. Created by Shakira and production trio The Matrix, the song is a critique of religion that questions the existence of God and His role in human suffering. The track opens with Gregorian chants and a recitation of the Lord's Prayer. Through its lyrics, the song poses questions about faith and about God's existence: "How many people die and hurt in your name? Hey does that make you proud, or does it bring you shame?" The song expresses frustration with the suffering, fighting, and historical crimes committed in God's name, as well as the conflicts between people, including siblings, driven by religious differences. In the bridge, Shakira incorporates chants in Arabic from Islam, in Hebrew from Judaism, and in Latin from Christianity, where each chanter seeks forgiveness, which is a common plea across these faiths. Shakira had previously explored her beliefs throughout her career, in songs such as "Te Necesito" (1995), and "Octavo Día" (1998). Another theme the song covers is sex.

== Censorship ==
"It is a song of peace and equality, because God is the same, no matter what they call him, whether Jehovah or Yahweh."

— Shakira on "How Do You Do".

In December 2005, "How Do You Do" faced harsh censorship in the Middle East, resulting in the entire Oral Fixation, Vol. 2 album not being distributed in many countries in the region. Mohamed Abdel Halim, the owner of Sony Music International's Cairo-based distributor, ordered its censorship, over its lyrics critical of religion that were considered blasphemous or disrespectful to religious figures and beliefs. In the region, the album was only released in Saudi Arabia, Lebanon, Bahrain, Oman, United Arab Emirates and Kuwait, and without the song "How Do You Do". Halin commented on not releasing the album: "As the Muslim owner of the company, I oppose the distribution of this album, even though I am aware that it could become a bestseller due to Shakira's popularity". This decision to censor the song was attributed to the limited openness toward religious discussions in certain regions like Egypt. The company had also tried to get Shakira to completely scrap the song, but she refused to do so.

In response to the situation, Shakira defended her song, clarifying that it was not intended to offend, but rather to encourage reflection and dialogue on issues related to religion. She called "How Do You Do" a hymn for "peace and equality" for all faiths, noting that the censorship might have stemmed from cultural differences.

== Reception ==
Critics have lauded "How Do You Do" for its bold and grand composition, as well as Shakira's multifaceted talent. Kristina Weise from Songwriter Universe called the song "a bold opening track." Billboard staff selected the song as the one "hidden gem" by The Matrix, encapsulating it as "a soaring rocker about grappling with faith", highlighting how it "turns the 'Our Father' prayer into a blistering bridge." Laura Murillo from Pulzo wrote that the song "showcases Shakira's versatility in singing, composing, and incorporating different sounds and sensations into her musical creations." Alexis Petridis from The Guardian highlighted the song's "winning chorus" that he claimed echoes the grandeur of arena rock.

== Live performances ==
Shakira performed "How Do You Do" alongside other songs for 90,000 people at Rock in Rio Lisboa II in Bela Vista Park, Lisbon in 2006.
