= No (Shakira song) =

2005 song by Shakira

- Artwork for the Mexican promotional single

Single by Shakira featuring Gustavo Cerati

from the album Fijación Oral, Vol. 1
- Released: 2 July 2005
- Studio: Henson (Hollywood, California)
- Genre: Latin pop
- Length: 4:45
- Label: Epic
- Composers: Shakira; Lester Mendez
- Lyricist: Shakira
- Producer: Shakira

Shakira singles chronology
"La Tortura" (2005)	"No" (2005)	"Don't Bother" (2005)

Music video
- "No" on YouTube

"No" is a song by Colombian singer-songwriter Shakira from her sixth studio album Fijación Oral, Vol. 1 (2005). Its lyrics were written by Shakira. Its music was composed by Shakira and Lester Mendez. The song features Argentine singer-songwriter Gustavo Cerati, who also served as an additional producer, played the guitar and provided backing vocals to the song. "No" was released as the second single from the album on 2 July 2005, by Epic Records. A Latin pop ballad, it explores a woman's effort in trying to tell her boyfriend that she no longer wants to be involved in a toxic relationship and that separating is best for both.

"No" received positive reviews from music critics, being called a "tender" ballad by a reviewer from Billboard. Commercially it attained moderate success, peaking at numbers eleven and two on the US Hot Latin Songs and Latin Pop Songs charts, respectively. An accompanying music video for "No" was directed by Jaume de Laiguana and depicts Shakira in a defunct ship yard. She also performed the song on several occasions, such as Madrid bid for the 2012 Summer Olympics and Los Premios MTV Latinoamérica 2006, as well as including it on the setlist for her Oral Fixation Tour (2006–07).

== Background and release ==
"Since always, since Soda Stereo, and also what he has been doing solo, so I looked for him with the intention of exchanging ideas, to undertake a search together. In the life of every artist there is a moment when there is the need to get together with other people, of exchanging points of view. And I needed it at this moment, after 14 years of career, to get together and learn from him who is a master. And although I looked for him as a co-producer for a couple of songs, he also sang and added some things".

— Shakira on working with Cerati.

Although at first Shakira did not know whether she would release an album in Spanish or English, she wanted to work on an album. After attaining crossover success in 2001 with her first English language album, Laundry Service, the singer wanted to release its follow-up. Shakira, having co-written almost 60 songs for the project, decided to divide the release into two volumes and put herself "on the mission of selecting [her] favorite ones" to the record. Shakira stated that she did the project "because it came out like this" and "that led to two albums". She decided that she wanted to release a Spanish language album first as part of a two-language bilingual project. This would be the first since Dónde Están los Ladrones? (1998). She said: "The market responded so well to Laundry Service. But what my soul asked me was to release first a record in Spanish. That's what I had to do".

When recording the albums, she worked with previous collaborators along with new partners, such as Spanish singer Alejandro Sanz and Argentine musician Gustavo Cerati. Shakira stated that "they are very credible artists within Hispanic music, great composers and unique voices". She also commented that the latter "has always been my idol, for me he's the maximum figure of rock en Español. The opportunity of co-producing with him was something very enriching for me and I enjoyed it very much as a fan that I am. It was dream come true to see him playing the guitar in the marquee of my house". In early June 2005, Shakira's spokespeople announced that "No" would be released in the following weeks as the second single from Fijación Oral, Vol. 1, after "La Tortura", but only in Latin American markets. The song was released on 2 July 2005, by Epic Records.

== Composition and recording ==
The lyrics of "No" were written by Shakira. The music was composed by her and Lester Mendez. It was produced by Shakira with additional production by Mendez and Cerati, who also played the guitar and provided backing vocals to the song. The mixing and engineering for "No" was performed by Rob Jacobs at Henson Recording Studios in Los Angeles, with additional engineering by Kevin Killen. Other instrumentation for "No" included guitar and acoustic guitar by Tony Reyes and Rene Toledo, drums by Jonathan Mover, and bass by Chris Chaney. Vlado Meller completed the audio mastering at Sony Music Studios in New York City. "No" is a pop ballad whose lyrics chronicle a woman's effort in trying to tell her boyfriend that she no longer wants to be involved in a relationship and that separating is best for both: "No, no intentes disculparte / no juegues a insistir / las excusas ya existían antes de ti / no, no me mires como antes / no hables en plural / la retórica es tu arma más letal". (Note: Translation in English: "Don't, don't try to apologize / don't insist again / excuses already existed before you / don't, don't look at me as before / don't speak in double-talk/ rhetoric is your most lethal weapon".) Additionally, the lyrics depict the distance that age marks between two people: "y que a tu edad sepas bien lo que es / romperle el corazón a alguien así [...] espero que no esperes que te espere / después de mis 26 la paciencia se me ha ido hasta los pies". (Note: Translation in English: "And at your age you know well what you are / break someone's heart like that [...] I hope you don't expect me to wait for you / after my 26 the patience has gone to my feet".) On a Colombian TV show, Shakira's first love, César Ulloa was interviewed and told the reporter that Shakira's mom told him that he was the inspiration behind this song. "No" is for Shakira a closure to that relationship.

== Reception ==
=== Critical ===
"No" received positive reviews from music critics. Matt Cibula from PopMatters opined that the song's "slow-burning reserve is the simple setting for the crazy diamond that is Shakira's voice. It is almost as if she contains so much emotion that she cannot be contained by human songform. And yes, I know this is an affectation; that's why I said 'almost'. But still, it's one hell of a trick". Billboard magazine classified it as a "tender ballad", whilst Sputnikmusic website said it was a "classic heartbreak song". Mark Kemp from Paste magazine stated that "No" was a "seething, acoustic-guitar-based" recording in which Cerati "fills the spaces between her words with subtle, tremolo-laden guitar lines". Spence D. from IGN website considered the song "starkly titled" and a "beautiful and haunting slow number that rides on Shakira's piercing vocals. Sure a wee bit of Celine over-emphasis creeps in on some of the warbles that tremor through her vocals", finishing the review of the song saying that "on the whole the song is a strong impression of what Shakira is capable of delivering: an impassioned sense of longing and desperation", whilst also recommending it for download. For Jorge Patiño from Rolling Stone Argentina, "it's not hard to imagine 'No' with less ornaments, a little bit more raw, because it is a great song that didn't need major touches to stand up for itself". According to Mariana Enriquez from Página/12 newspaper, "just a few write as well as Shakira", and that the best example was "No". Besides stating that it was a "poignant ballad whichever way you look at it, and it's impossible to hear it without spilling tears if the listener is suffering for love", she considered that the song was "better than all the recent songs by the former Soda Stereo together". "No" was recognized as one of the best-performing Latin songs of the year at the 2007 BMI Latin Awards.

=== Commercial ===
On 10 September 2005, "No" debuted at number 41 on the US Hot Latin Songs chart. It slowly rose to its peak of number 11 on 10 December 2005. It achieved better success on the Latin Pop Songs chart, peaking at number two on 3 December 2005. The song was placed eighth on the Hot Latin Songs year-end chart.

== Music video ==
Shakira making butterfly wings in the music video for "No"

An accompanying music video for "No" was directed by Spanish director Jaume de Laiguana, who would later work with Shakira for various other projects. It was supposed to be filmed on 26–27 June 2005 in a defunct ship yard in Barcelona, Spain, but its date was changed to July 4. The clip was produced by Sergi Ciuro and Ester Udaeta, co-produced by Laiguana and Piramide, cinematographed by Alejandro Oset, and edited by Anna Oriol. It was premiered in late July 2005. Recorded without Gustavo Cerati, the black-and-white video depicts a sad Shakira, with tears rolling down her face. At the defunct ship yard, she is surrounded by several rail tracks and cars, some of the latter which are used for her to sit on. Towards the end of the video, one of the small wooden car falls off the track and into water beneath a cliff. Throughout the clip, Shakira is engaged in building butterfly wings. At the closing moments of the video, she stands at the water's edge, ready to take flight, but does not go through with it and walks away, smiling slightly. The video was included on Oral Fixation Volumes 1 & 2 bonus DVD.

== Live performances and cover ==
Shakira performed "No" for the first time at Madrid bid for the 2012 Summer Olympics on 5 June 2005. Five days later, Shakira sang the song on Despierta America, Hoy on 15 June, and No Manches on 16 June. After performing "No" on Otro Rollo the day before, the singer made an appearance to sing it on MTV Day festival in Madrid, Spain which occurred on 29 June 2005, among other songs from her back catalog. On 11 July 2005, she went to Argentina and gave a performance of "No" on Susana Giménez TV show, and on her own special concert titled Shakira: Íntimo, both aired by Telefe. Shakira also sang "No" on Channel n°4 in Spain on 8 November 2005. In the same country, she participated on a special show titled Andalucía Te Quiere where she performed the song among other songs in March 2006. The singer performed the song on Chilean television show Sábado Gigante on 20 May 2006. Shortly before the start of her tour, Shakira sang it during the Rock in Rio festival in Lisbon, Portugal, on 26 May. The song was included in the concert setlist of her 2006–07 Oral Fixation Tour, which was launched to promote the albums Fijación Oral, Vol. 1 and Oral Fixation, Vol. 2. The performance of the song during the concert in Miami, Florida, on 9 December 2006, was filmed for a live album release. On 19 October 2006, Shakira gave a performance of "No" on Los Premios MTV Latinoamérica 2006.

At the 12th Latin Grammy Awards ceremony in 2011, Venezuelan singer-songwriter Franco De Vita performed a live cover of "No" as part of the Latin Grammys tribute to Shakira, where she was honored Latin Recording Academy Person of the Year.

== Track listing ==
- Mexican promo CD single
1. "No" – 4:45

== Credits and personnel ==
Credits adapted from the liner notes of Fijación Oral, Vol. 1:

- Shakira – lead vocals, songwriter, producer
- Gustavo Cerati – additional producer, backing vocals, guitar, vocals
- Rene Toledo – acoustic guitar
- Tony Reyes – guitar
- Lester Mendez – songwriter, assistant producer, keyboards & synthesizers
- Jonathan Mover - drums
- Chris Chaney - bass
- Rob Jacobs - mixing, engineer
- Henry Gerhart - live audio engineer
- Kevin Killen - engineer
- Pete Davis - programming
- Vlado Meller - mastering

== Charts ==
=== Weekly charts ===
Chart (2005)	Peak position
Colombia (Associated Press)	2
Costa Rica (ACAN-EFE)	9
El Salvador (ACAN-EFE)	5
Guatemala (ACAN-EFE)	2
Honduras (ACAN-EFE)	6
Mexico (Associated Press)	6
Panamá (ACAN-EFE)	3
US Hot Latin Songs (Billboard)	11
US Latin Pop Airplay (Billboard)	2
Venezuela (Associated Press)	6

=== Year-end charts ===
Chart (2005)	Position
US Latin Pop Songs (Billboard)	34

Chart (2006)	Position
US Latin Pop Songs (Billboard)	8

== Certifications ==
Region	Certification	Certified units/sales
Mexico (AMPROFON)	4× Platinum	240,000^{‡}
^{‡} Sales+streaming figures based on certification alone.

== Release history ==
Release dates and formats for "No"
Region	Date	Format(s)	Label(s)	Ref.
Mexico	2 July 2005	CD	Sony BMG	
