= Don't Bother =

2005 song by Shakira

Single by Shakira

from the album Oral Fixation, Vol. 2
- B-side: "No"
- Released: 11 October 2005
- Studio: The Warehouse (Vancouver, British Columbia); La Marimonda (Nassau, Bahamas)
- Genre: Pop rock; synth-rock
- Length: 4:17
- Label: Epic
- Composers: Shakira; Lauren Christy; Scott Spock; Graham Edwards; Leisha Hailey; Heather Reid
- Lyricist: Shakira
- Producer: Shakira

Shakira singles chronology
"No" (2005)	"Don't Bother" (2005)	"Día de Enero" (2006)

Music video
- "Don't Bother" on YouTube

"Don't Bother" is a song performed by Colombian singer-songwriter Shakira, taken from her seventh studio album and second English-language album, Oral Fixation, Vol. 2. The song was released on 11 October 2005 by Epic Records as the lead single from the album. The song was written by Shakira, along with the Matrix and Heather Reid and Leisha Hailey of the Murmurs. It was produced by Shakira with additional by Gustavo Cerati. Lester Mendez also served as an assistant producer. "Don't Bother" is a rock-influenced song in which Shakira assures her former lover that she does not need his sympathy and can move on without him.

Upon its release, "Don't Bother" received generally mixed reviews from music critics, who praised Shakira's vocals but felt that the lyrics of the song were strange. Commercially, the track fared well on record charts, entering the top ten in twelve countries worldwide. In the United States, the song peaked at number 42 on the US Billboard Hot 100, and at number 25 on the Billboard Mainstream Top 40 chart. "Don't Bother" was later certified Gold by the Recording Industry Association of America (RIAA) for digital downloads of 500,000 units. An accompanying music video for the song was directed by Jaume de Laiguana, and features Shakira tormenting her former lover by crushing his car in a wrecking yard. For additional promotion, Shakira performed the song on a number of award and reality shows. It was also included on the setlist of her 2006–07 Oral Fixation Tour, and her 2025-26 Las Mujeres Ya No Lloran World Tour with updated lyrics.

== Music and lyrics ==
"Don't Bother"
A 24 second sample of "Don't Bother" containing part of the chorus. On the rock-tinged song, Shakira refuses to ask for her former lover's sympathy after the end of their relationship and assures him that she will move on.

"Don't Bother" was co-written by Shakira, Leisha Hailey, Heather Reid, and American pop music production trio the Matrix. Shakira also produced the song. Additional production was provided by Argentine singer-songwriter Gustavo Cerati. Lester Mendez served as an assistant producer. Similar to her seventh studio album Oral Fixation, Vol. 2, (2005), "Don't Bother" musically shifts to a more rock-styled composition as compared to Shakira's previous English releases. According to the sheet music published at Musicnotes.com by Sony/ATV Music Publishing, the song is published in the key of E minor (the relative key G major is in the chorus) and has a moderate rock tempo of 130 beats per minute. Shakira's vocal range on the song spans from the note of E_{3} to E_{5}. Through the lyrics of the song, Shakira urges her former lover not to "bother" feeling sorry for her after he chose another woman over her. She assures him that he "won’t ever see me [Shakira] cry" and that she will move on in her life without him. The song contains a spoken bridge in which Shakira lists a number of things she could do to make him stay with her, such as "move(ing) to a communist country", but admits that they would not have an effect on him. Pam Avoledo from Blogcritics found the theme of the song similar to the one in Shakira's 2002 single "Objection (Tango)". Shakira described the song as a feminist anthem, saying:

"I think 'Don't Bother' has a lot of pain in it as a song, but also a lot of humour and sarcasm. Yes, it is a way of exorcising all of these feelings, a form of catharsis, getting rid of all of those emotions that torture us women at some point in our lives"

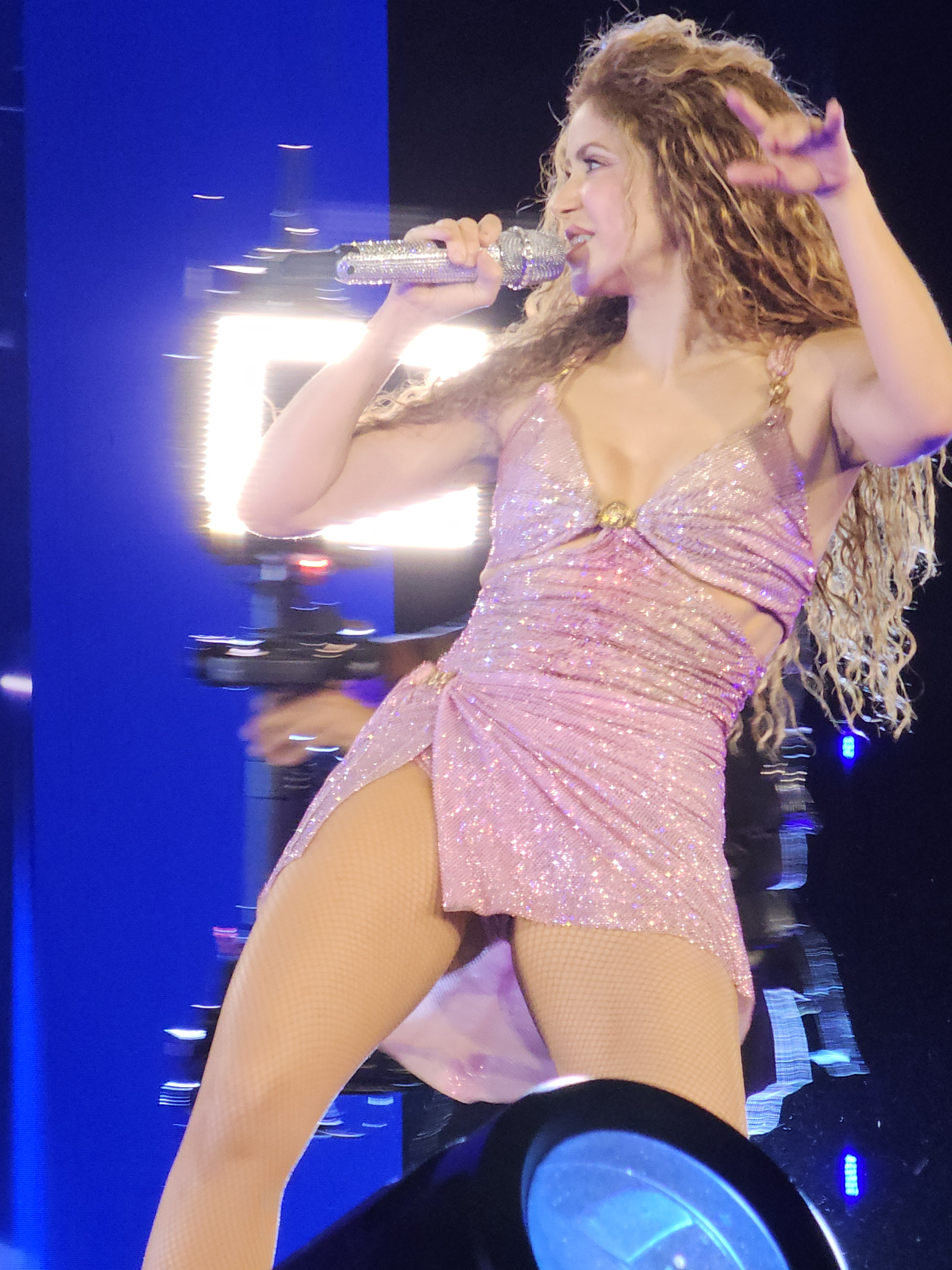
Shakira performing the song during her 2025-2026 'Las Mujeres Ya No Lloran World Tour.'

It is also worth noting that the song received changes in its lyrics during her Las Mujeres Ya No Lloran World Tour, aimed to take jabs at her ex-boyfriend, Gerald Piqué and mistress Clara Chia.

Lyric Changes
Album Song Lyrics	LMYNL Tour Song Lyrics
She's got her perfect friends Oh, isn't she cool?	She's got her stupid friends Oh, isn't she cool?
She practices Tai Chi She'd never lose her nerve	She works for you for free Don't make her lose her mind
She's more than you deserve She's just far better than me	She's more than you deserve And yet she's still not better than me
For you, I'd give up all I own And move to a communist country If you come with me of course	I gave up everything I had for you And moved to a socialist country Just to be with you
And I'd file my nails so they don't hurt you And lose those pounds, learn about football If it made you stay, but you won't, but you won't	I filed my nails down so they wouldn't hurt you I lost weight, learned about football Just so you'd stay, but you didn't, and you won't

== Release ==
"Don't Bother" was issued by Epic Records as the lead single from Oral Fixation, Vol 2 and premiered on 9 October 2005 in the United States by AOL Music's First Listen initiative. The single saw its European physical release on 4 November 2005, having been made available for digital download on the iTunes Store on 18 October. In the United Kingdom, "Don't Bother" was issued as a CD single on 27 February 2006.

== Critical reception ==
The song received generally mixed reviews from music critics. Matt Cibula from PopMatters praised its theme and Shakira's "furious and sexual and self-mocking" vocal delivery, but found the song "strange" and "internally inconsistent". Alexis Petridis from The Guardian complimented the unpredictable nature of the song, although he also noted that the lyrics at times suggested a "faltering grasp of English". Edward Oculicz from Stylus Magazine gave it a positive review, calling the song's chorus "bruised" and "anthemic" and the lyrics "impossible for native speakers to emulate". Pam Avoledo from Blogcritics was also positive towards the song, noting improvement in Shakira's vocal delivery and calling them "brassy yet sensitive". Spencer D. from IGN Music felt the highlight to the song was Shakira's spoken bridge, saying that it lets the "light tinges of her accent roll of her tongue and present her as herself rather than the obvious result of previous pop matrons". Stephen Thomas Erlewine from AllMusic picked the song as a highlight from the album. Chuck Taylor of Billboard magazine offered a more mixed review, noting how "there are moments where she barks like a sea lion," but praised the track for its similarity to the Cure's "Just like Heaven" at its midsection; despite that he continued to criticize Shakira's vocals, "which at best are an acquired taste" and described the song as "just a little...too Shakira."

== Chart performance ==
In Austria, the song entered the singles chart at number 17 and peaked at number six, spending a total of 24 weeks on the chart. In Finland, the song entered and peaked at number four on the chart, becoming Shakira's highest-peaking single in the region since "Whenever, Wherever", (2001). Its stay in the chart, however, was very short and lasted for only a week. "Don't Bother" reached number five on the singles chart in Hungary, and also peaked at number six on the airplay chart. In Italy, the song performed moderately well, entering the chart at number 12 and peaking at number eight; it spent a total of 11 weeks on the chart. In Norway, the song narrowly missed the top five by peaking at number six. In Switzerland, the song entered the chart at number 10 and peaked at number eight; it stayed on the chart for a long period of 31 weeks. In the United Kingdom, the song debuted and peaked at number nine on the singles chart, spending a total of five weeks on the chart. It was Shakira's first single since "Objection (Tango)" (2002), to chart in the country.

In the United States, "Don't Bother" narrowly missed charting inside the top 40 of the Billboard Hot 100 chart by peaking at number 42. It spent a total of nine weeks on the chart. On the Mainstream Top 40 chart, it peaked at number 25 and spent a total of 10 weeks on the chart. In the US, the song was certified gold by the Recording Industry Association of America for shipments of 500,000 units.

== Music video ==
The accompanying music video for "Don't Bother" was directed by Jaume de Laiguana, who had previously collaborated with Shakira on the video for "No", and was released on 15 November 2005. The video begins with a man parking his sports car in front of a house and proceeding to enter it. Shakira is seen lying on a bed in the house and the man comes up and lies beside her, indicating that they are a couple. As soon as the man falls asleep, Shakira wakes up and lies atop the man and begins to caress him and bite and whisper in his ear a few times, although he does not wake up. Shakira takes the keys of the man's car and drives it to a wrecking yard. The video then interludes to scenes of Shakira sexually romancing the man in a shower. The scene then changes back to the wrecking yard, where Shakira begins playing a pink guitar. After the spoken bridge of the song, Shakira places her partner's car in a car crusher, which soon commences demolishing it. The man reacts in a similar manner to the car being crushed and begins experiencing continuous body jerks and spasms, indicating a connection between his car and his body. After the car is fully destroyed, Shakira leaves the man unconscious on the bed, exits the house, and begins walking on the street triumphantly. Shakira explained the usage of the car symbolism in the video, saying that "A man's car is like an extension of their ego and their manhood. I thought this would be a video that would make women say, 'Yeah, yeah!' and it would make men feel".

Sal Cinquemani from Slant Magazine positively reacted to the video and found it "rich with symbolism". Shakira revealed that a nun from a Catholic high school she had attended was angered by the video by saying that "One of the nuns is looking for me after seeing the "Don't Bother" video".

=== Resurgence in 2019 ===
After 14 years of release, in the second week of September 2019, the official music video witnessed an unexpected surge in views on YouTube, racking up over 15 million views in 4 days.

== Live performances ==
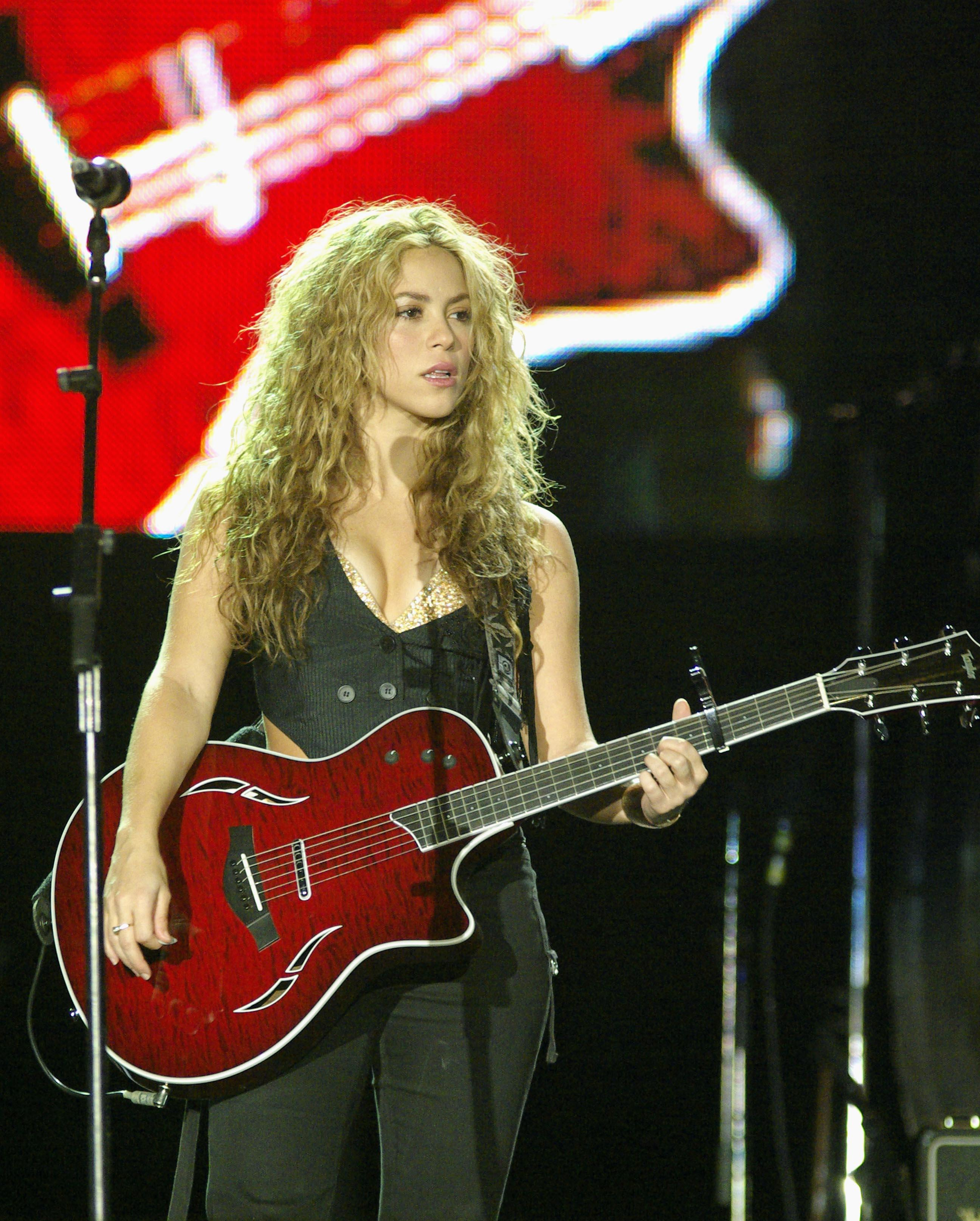
Shakira performing "Don't Bother" at Rock in Rio in Madrid, Spain

Shakira performed "Don't Bother" live for the first time at the 2005 Nordic Music Awards, held on 29 October 2005. She next went on to perform the song at the 2005 MTV Europe Music Awards ceremony held on 3 November 2005, where she also won the award for "Best Female Artist". In November, the singer gave a surprise concert at Times Square and performed "Don't Bother" along with "La Tortura" and "Hey You". "Don't Bother" was also performed on television show Jensen! along with "La Tortura". It was followed by performances on Good Morning America on 2 December, and The Ellen DeGeneres Show three days later. On 10 December 2005, she performed the song along with "La Tortura" on Saturday Night Live. Five days later, Shakira performed the song during an appearance on Late Night with David Letterman. It was also included the song to her set on Z100's Jingle Ball at Madison Square Garden in New York which happened the day after. The singer also performed "Don't Bother" live on MTV's New Year of Music at Times Square, on 31 December 2005.

She returned to Europe to another promotional tour for the song, starting on 21 January 2006 at the NRJ Music Awards in France. Shakira later went to the United Kingdom to perform "Don't Bother" on Top of the Pops on 29 January, and CD:UK on 4 February. On 2 March, she appeared on GMTV to promote the song, also appearing on Sanremo Music Festival 2006 the same day, and Popworld two days later. She then traveled to Germany to perform the song on 12 March 2006 at the Echo Awards.

Shortly before the start of her tour, Shakira performed the song during the Rock in Rio festival in Lisbon, Portugal, on 26 May 2006. "Don't Bother" was included in the concert setlist of her Oral Fixation Tour, which was launched in 2006 to promote the albums Fijación Oral, Vol. 1 and Oral Fixation, Vol. 2. While headlining at the 2007 Live Earth concert held in Hamburg on 7 July 2007, Germany, Shakira performed "Don't Bother" along with three other songs. She also included the song on the set list for her concert at Rock in Rio held at Madrid, Spain, on 4 July 2008.

== Track listings ==
- CD single
1. "Don't Bother" – 4:17
2. "No" ft. Gustavo Cerati (Album Version) – 4:45
3. "Don't Bother" (Jrsnchz Main Mix) – 5:34
4. "No" ft. Gustavo Cerati (Music video)
- Digital download
1. "Don't Bother" – 4:17

== Charts ==
=== Weekly charts ===
Weekly chart performance for "Don't Bother"
Chart (2005–2006)	Peak position
Australia (ARIA)	30
Austria (Ö3 Austria Top 40)	6
Belgium (Ultratop 50 Flanders)	28
Belgium (Ultratop 50 Wallonia)	32
Canada CHR/Pop Top 30 (Radio & Records)	23
CIS Airplay (TopHit)	9
Czech Republic Airplay (ČNS IFPI)	7
Denmark (Tracklisten)	14
Europe (Eurochart Hot 100)	17
European Radio Airplay (Billboard)	4
Finland (Suomen virallinen lista)	4
France (SNEP)	24
Germany (GfK)	7
Germany Airplay (BVMI)	3
Greece (IFPI)	6
Hungary (Rádiós Top 40)	6
Hungary (Single Top 40)	5
Ireland (IRMA)	13
Italy (FIMI)	8
Netherlands (Dutch Top 40)	4
Netherlands (Single Top 100)	15
Norway (VG-lista)	6
Romania (Romanian Top 100)	5
Russia Airplay (TopHit)	23
Sweden (Sverigetopplistan)	28
Switzerland (Schweizer Hitparade)	8
UK Singles (Official Charts)	9
Ukraine Airplay (TopHit)	95
US Billboard Hot 100	42
US Pop Airplay (Billboard)	25
US Pop 100 (Billboard)	24
US Pop 100 Airplay (Billboard)	29
US CHR/Pop (Radio & Records)	24

=== Year-end charts ===
2005 year-end chart performance for "Don't Bother"
Chart (2005)	Position
Lebanon (Airplay Top 100)	84
Netherlands (Dutch Top 40)	64

2006 year-end chart performance for "Don't Bother"
Chart (2006)	Position
Austria (Ö3 Austria Top 40)	73
CIS (TopHit)	70
Europe (Eurochart Hot 100)	83
Germany (Media Control GfK)	59
Hungary (Rádiós Top 40)	68
Russia Airplay (TopHit)	157
Switzerland (Schweizer Hitparade)	91

== Certifications ==
Certifications and sales for "Don't Bother"
Region	Certification	Certified units/sales
United States (RIAA)	Gold	500,000^{^}
^{^} Shipments figures based on certification alone.

== Release history ==
Release dates and formats for "Don't Bother"
Region	Date	Format(s)	Label(s)	Ref.
United States	11 October 2005	Contemporary hit radio; rhythmic contemporary radio	Epic	
United States	18 October 2005	Digital download	Epic	
Australia	4 November 2005	Digital download (EP)	Sony BMG	
Germany	4 November 2005	CD; maxi CD	Sony BMG	
Denmark	7 November 2005	CD	Sony BMG	
Australia	21 November 2005	Maxi CD	Sony BMG	
France	23 January 2006	CD	Sony BMG	
France	27 February 2006	DVD	Sony BMG	
United Kingdom	27 February 2006	CD	RCA	
