= Illegal (Shakira song) =

2006 single by Shakira

Single by Shakira featuring Carlos Santana

from the album Oral Fixation, Vol. 2
- Released: 28 August 2006
- Studio: Criteria Studios (Miami, FL)
- Genre: Pop; country
- Length: 3:52
- Label: Epic
- Composers: Shakira; Lester Mendez
- Lyricist: Shakira
- Producer: Shakira

Shakira singles chronology
"La Pared" (2006)	"Illegal" (2006)	"Te Lo Agradezco, Pero No" (2006)

Carlos Santana singles chronology
"Cry Baby Cry" (2006)	"Illegal" (2006)	"Into the Night" (2007)

Music video
- "Illegal" on YouTube

"Illegal" is a song recorded by Colombian singer-songwriter Shakira for her seventh studio album, Oral Fixation, Vol. 2 (2005). It was written and produced by Shakira and Lester Mendez and it features Mexican-American guitarist Carlos Santana. Epic Records released the song as the second (third overall) and final single from the standard edition of the album on 28 August 2006, following the release of "Hips Don't Lie". "Illegal" is a pop and country ballad with lyrics concerning mourning of a past lover complete with an understated vocal performance by Shakira and an electric guitar riff by Santana throughout. It received mixed reviews from music critics, who compared it with Alanis Morissette's material and were mixed towards Santana's contribution.

The song achieved moderate success, topping the chart in Romania and the US Dance Club Songs chart and peaking within the top ten in Austria, Italy, Netherlands, Hungary and Switzerland among other countries. The music video for the song, co-directed by Jaume de Laiguana and Shakira, had its premiere on 16 November 2006 on MTV's Total Request Live (TRL). It features the singer portraying a girlfriend of a boxer and follows a similar storyline to the song's lyrics. "Illegal" has been performed by the singer live on few occasions, such as during the MTV 5 Star event (2005) and Good Morning America (2006).

== Composition and production ==
"Illegal"
A 21-second sample of the chorus of "Illegal" during which Shakira can be heard singing about the loss of a lover.

"Illegal" is a ballad with lyrics revolving around mourning for the loss of a lover, as seen in the lines, "It should be illegal to deceive a woman's heart". It contains elements of pop and country music. Spence D. of the website IGN felt that Shakira adopted an "almost modern day country-styled pop aesthetic". Throughout the song, her vocals are subdued, complete with "rolling delivering, breathy accentuations, and... trill". AllMusic reviewer Stephen Thomas Erlewine noted that the lyrics "You said you would love me until you died/And as far as I know you're still alive" were similar to Alanis Morissette's "You Oughta Know" (1995).

"Illegal" was co-written by Shakira and Lester Mendez. The track was produced by Shakira with additional production handled by Jose "Gacho" Torres. Mendez also served as an assistant producer. Mexican guitarist Carlos Santana appears as a featured artist on the song, playing an electrical guitar throughout. The guitar was also played by Lyle Workman. The other instruments featured in the song are keyboards played by Lester Mendez, bass by Paul Bushnell, drums by Shawn Pelton and percussion by Luis Contez. The mixing was done by Rob Jacobs while the audio engineering was finished by Kevin Killen, Serge "Sergical" Tsai and Vlado Meller, who mastered the song with the assistance of Mark Santangelo.

== Release ==
"Illegal" was released as a CD single on 6 November 2006. An EP of the song featuring two versions of the song and "La Tortura" was available for digital download on 9 December 2006. A second, enhanced CD single featuring two versions of the song along with "La Tortura" and its music video was released on 18 December 2006.

== Critical reception ==
The song has received polarized reviews from music critics. A writer of Billboard was very positive towards the song, calling it "gorgeous" and Shakira's "most understated performance to date". He further praised Santana's quiet guitar contribution, comparing it to "tears accompanying the loss". The critic finished his review by concluding that time would be needed for channels streaming the song to propel it to the top 40 of the charts, "but this forlorn masterpiece is as instantly reactive on the slow side as 'Whenever, Wherever' was on the fast". In a review of Oral Fixation, Vol. 2, Thomas Erlewine said that Shakira takes her music into unexpected directions with "Illegal". Matt Cibula, in a review for PopMatters, found country music elements on the song, adding that its chorus could easily make it a CMT number-one single. A Dotmusic journalist praised the singer's vocal performance in the song as a proof that she "certainly has a sweet croon". Spence D. of IGN also praised her vocals in the quiet song and complimented Santana's performance for bringing "nice ambiance". Entertainment Weekly's David Browne gave a more mixed review, opining that "'Don't Bother' and 'Illegal' are sister-of-Alanis catfights we've heard before". Barry Walters from Rolling Stone said that Santana's contribution in the song was "instantly recognizable and somewhat disruptive". Similarly, Lauren Murphy from entertainment.ie felt that his "conscription" and riff contribution to the song was "somewhat lackluster". A writer of E! Online dubbed "Illegal" a "total buzzkill".

Robert Copsey of the website Digital Spy placed the song seventh on his list of Shakira's ten best songs, published in 2014 writing that "it hasn't aged a day". The same year, Emily Exton of VH1 placed the track on her list of Shakira's best duets, summarizing "The pained musings of a woman scorned, punctuated by the legend's iconic guitar groove". A writer of the website Telemundo included "Illegal" on his list of Shakira's best musical collaborations in 2015.

Billboard included "Illegal" among Santana's 10 'timeless' collaborations.

== Chart performance ==
In the United States, "Illegal" managed to top the Billboard Dance Club Songs chart for the week of 10 February 2007. On the UK Singles Chart, the single debuted at the position of 94 on 16 December 2006 and it moved to its peak position of 34 the following week. It spent a total of four weeks on the chart. On the charts in Austria, "Illegal" debuted at number nine on 8 December 2006 which later became its peak position on the chart on which it gradually descended for seventeen weeks, appearing for the last time on the chart issue of 13 April 2007. At the end of 2007, it emerged as the 66th top single in that country's year-end chart. The single debuted at number ten in its first week of charting on the Swiss Hitparade on 3 December 2006 and it spent a total of 21 weeks in that country. In Germany, "Illegal" rose to the position of eleven and was ranked 76th on the 2007 year-end chart in that country. On 23 November 2006, "Illegal" debuted at number nine on the Italian Singles Chart and then rose to number four in its ninth week of charting, on 18 January 2007. It spent fourteen consecutive weeks in the chart's top twenty and was last seen on 22 February 2007. Inside the Romanian Top 100, "Illegal" was Shakira's fourth single to reach the number-one position on 22 January 2007. It held the top spot for five non-consecutive weeks. The single further peaked at numbers three, four and six on the charts in Slovakia, the Czech Republic and Hungary, respectively.

== Music video ==
The music video for "Illegal" was shot in Mexico City on 17 October 2006, during a short break in the schedule of the Oral Fixation Tour, between concerts in Mexico and Guatemala. Jaume de Laiguana and Shakira were the co-directors of the video. The filming took a full day, and some American and Mexican fans were invited over as extras. It officially premiered on 16 November 2006 on MTV's Total Request Live (TRL). The video features Shakira as the girlfriend of a boxer. Throughout most of the video, she is shown in the empty boxing venue where her former boyfriend boxes. Through flashbacks, she remembers the good times in their relationship – including being alone in the ring, affectionately treating each other. At the end of the video, the reason behind their break-up is shown. Shakira comes to see her boyfriend boxing in the championship match where he wins, unaware that Shakira is there watching him. Another girl steps in the ring and kisses the boxer, revealing to Shakira he is cheating on her. Her boyfriend, to his shock, finally sees that Shakira is watching him kiss the other girl. The video ends with her looking back at him, clearly hurt, before turning away and leaving.

== Live performances ==
An MTV 5 Star performance of the song from 2005, was uploaded to Shakira's official Vevo account on 24 March 2011. In December 2006, "Illegal" was performed during the singer's appearance at Good Morning America.

== Track listing and formats ==
- ;CD single 1
1. "Illegal" [Album Version] (featuring Carlos Santana) – 03:54
2. "Illegal" [Ali Dee Remix] (featuring Carlos Santana) – 03:49
3. "Obtener Un Sí" [Album Version] – 03:20
- ;CD single 2
1. "Illegal" [Album Version] (featuring Carlos Santana) – 03:54
2. "Illegal" [Alee Dee Remix] (featuring Carlos Santana) – 03:49
3. "La Tortura" [Album Version] – 3:35
4. "La Tortura" [CD-Rom Video] – 3:45
- ;Promotional CD
1. "Illegal" [Johnny Vicious Warehouse Mix] – 10:00
2. "Illegal" [Johnny Vicious Warehouse Radio Mix] – 3:45
3. "Illegal" [Johnny Vicious Roxy Mix] – 8:00
4. "Illegal" [Johnny Vicious Roxy Radio Mix] – 4:14
5. "Illegal" [Johnny Vicious Ballroom Mix] – 7:28
6. "Illegal" [Johnny Vicious Ballroom Dub] – 5:37

== Credits and personnel ==
- Featured artist – Carlos Santana
- Songwriting – Shakira, Lester Mendez
- Music – Lester Mendez
- Bass – Paul Bushnell
- Drums – Shawn Pelton
- Guitar – Carlos Santana, Lyle Workman
- Keyboards – Lester Mendez
- Percussion – Luis Contez
- Production – Shakira
  - Additional – Jose "Gacho" Torres
- Co-production – Lester Mendez
- Mixing – Rob Jacobs
- Mastering - Vlado Meller
  - Assistant –Mark Santangelo
- Engineering – Rob Jacobs
- Recording engineer – Kevin Killen, Serge "Sergical" Tsai

Credits and personnel adapted from the liner notes of Oral Fixation Vol. 2.

== Charts ==
=== Weekly charts ===
Chart (2006–2007)	Peak position
Austria (Ö3 Austria Top 40)	9
Belgium (Ultratop 50 Flanders)	22
Belgium (Ultratop 50 Wallonia)	16
CIS Airplay (TopHit)	77
Czech Republic Airplay (ČNS IFPI)	4
Denmark (Tracklisten)	27
European Hot 100 Singles (Billboard)	21
Finland (Suomen virallinen lista)	14
Germany (GfK)	11
Global Dance Songs (Billboard)	33
Guatemala (EFE)	8
Hungary (Rádiós Top 40)	6
Ireland (IRMA)	21
Italy (FIMI)	4
Netherlands (Dutch Top 40)	8
Netherlands (Single Top 100)	7
Romania (Romanian Top 100)	1
Russia Airplay (TopHit)	117
Slovakia Airplay (ČNS IFPI)	3
Sweden (Sverigetopplistan)	47
Switzerland (Schweizer Hitparade)	10
UK Singles (Official Charts)	34
Ukraine Airplay (TopHit)	71
US Dance Club Songs (Billboard)	1

=== Year-end charts ===
Chart (2006)	Position
Lebanon (Airplay Top 100)	93
Netherlands (Dutch Top 40)	62
Netherlands (Single Top 100)	83
Switzerland (Schweizer Hitparade)	100

Chart (2007)	Position
Austria (Ö3 Austria Top 40)	66
Belgium (Ultratop Wallonia)	88
Germany (Official German Charts)	76
Hungary (Rádiós Top 40)	35
Netherlands (Single Top 100)	73
Romania (Romanian Top 100)	35
US Dance Club Songs (Billboard)	38

== Release history ==
Release dates and formats for "Illegal"
Region	Date	Format(s)	Label(s)	Ref.
Russia	28 August 2006	Contemporary hit radio	Sony BMG	
United States	6 November 2006	Digital download; enhanced CD	Epic	
Germany	17 November 2006	CD; maxi CD	Sony BMG	
United Kingdom	9 December 2006	Digital download (EP)	RCA	
United Kingdom	11 December 2006	CD	RCA	
France	18 December 2006	CD	Sony BMG	
United Kingdom	18 December 2006	Enhanced CD	RCA	

== See also ==
- List of number-one dance singles of 2007 (U.S.)
- List of Romanian Top 100 number ones of the 2000s
