= Las de la Intuición =

2007 single by Shakira

- Remix album artwork.

Single by Shakira

from the album Fijación Oral, Vol. 1
- Released: 29 January 2007 ("Pure Intuition"); 24 February 2007 ("Las de la Intuición").
- Studio: Criteria Studios (Miami, FL)
- Genre: Synth-pop; Euro house
- Length: 3:41
- Label: Epic; Pacha Recordings; Central Station
- Composers: Shakira; Luis Fernando Ochoa
- Lyricist: Shakira
- Producer: Shakira

Shakira singles chronology
"Te Lo Agradezco, Pero No" (2006)	"Las de la Intuición" / "Pure Intuition" (2007)	"Beautiful Liar" (2007)

"Pure Intuition"
- English version cover

Music video
- "Las de la Intuición" on YouTube

"Las de la Intuición" (English: "The Ones with the Intuition") is a song by Colombian singer-songwriter Shakira from her sixth studio album Fijación Oral Vol. 1 (2005). It was produced by the singer with Lester Mendez serving as an assistant producer, with its lyrics being written by the singer and its music co-composed by the singer and Luis Fernando Ochoa. It was sent to Spanish radio stations on 24 February 2007, as the fourth and final single from the album. "Las de la Intuición" is a synth-pop and Euro house track whose lyrics talk about female intuition. It received mostly positive reviews from music critics, who commended its lyrical content and production. The track was a commercial success in Spain, topping the Airplay chart, and entering the top ten on the Downloads and Original Tones charts, all published by the Productores de Música de España (PROMUSICAE). It received a five-times Platinum certification by the organization for 100,000 ringtones sold, and became the song of the summer of the country in 2007. Elsewhere, it entered the charts in Russia and Venezuela.

An accompanying music video for "Las de la Intuición", directed by the singer alongside Jaume de Laiguana, was recorded in Miami, Florida. It was inspired by the work of German-Australian photographer Helmut Newton and depicts Shakira performing and dancing to the track while wearing a purple wig and different outfits such as a black corset and garter belts. It was well received by many critics, who considered it one of her sexiest music videos. The artist performed "Las de la Intuición" at the Rock in Rio festival on the 2008, 2010 and 2011 editions. She also included it on the set list of The Sun Comes Out World Tour (2010–11), her fifth concert tour. The track has been covered on Spanish musical 40: El Musical and on different reality television talent shows such as Operación Triunfo, Tu cara me suena and La Academia.

An English version of the song, titled "Pure Intuition", did not appear on Fijación Oral Vol. 1, but became the main theme of SEAT's campaign "Catch the Fever". It was released as a single on 29 January 2007 in Netherlands, where it peaked at number six. Despite being released there officially at the time, it is not available to stream or buy. Just like the original version, "Pure Intuition" was a commercial success in Spain, topping the Downloads chart and receiving a seven-times Platinum certification by PROMUSICAE for 140,000 copies sold in the country. It also entered the top ten on the Romanian Top 100 and the Euro Digital Tracks charts.

== Background and composition ==
After finishing El Tour de la Mangosta (2002–03), Shakira began writing songs for the successor of her studio album Laundry Service (2001). For four months, she rented an estate in Alcalá de Henares, Madrid, Spain, where she wrote "Las de la Intuición" as well as other tracks like "La Tortura" and "La Pared". Regarding her decision to work in isolation, the singer said, "I used to write on airplanes or after getting out of the shower, but now I need privacy to express my feelings." "Las de la Intuición" was included on Shakira's sixth studio album, Fijación Oral, Vol. 1 (2005), which was composed of songs in Spanish. It was co-written by the singer alongside Luis Fernando Ochoa, with production by the singer with Lester Mendez as an assistant producer. It is a synth-pop and Euro house track whose lyrics discuss female intuition. When asked about the song's theme, Shakira said; "I usually follow [my intuition], but I like to know other people's opinions so I can have another perspective." In another interview, she added that she was a loyal believer of female intuition and that she considered it her "best weapon and adviser." "Las de la Intuición" was sent to Spanish radio stations on 24 February 2007 as the fourth single from Fijación Oral, Vol. 1. Initially not planned as a single, it was released due to fans' requests. Spanish label Pacha Recordings released a series of remixes of the song in different formats: four twelve-inch singles in 2007 and three extended plays in 2009 via the iTunes store. On 12 September 2009, Australian label Central Station released a remix album of "Las de la Intuición", also on iTunes.

=== "Pure Intuition" ===
In January 2007, Spanish automobile manufacturer SEAT announced a partnership with Shakira under the slogan "Catch the Fever". The firm, which also sponsored the European leg of the singer's Oral Fixation Tour (2006–07), revealed that they would launch an advertising campaign in the continent, which would include promotion on radio stations, television and print publications. Also, it was reported that the singer had recorded an exclusive track for a television commercial. On 29 January, "Pure Intuition", the English-language version of "Las de la Intuición", was released as a single in the Netherlands. Two days later, SEAT launched the campaign and released the television commercial featuring the track, which was aired in twenty European countries. It was picked up as the Alarmschijf (most-played new song) by Dutch Radio 538 on the week of 26 January 2007. On 28 February 2007, the track was released in Hungary. Despite the track's popularity in the Netherlands, Shakira did not shoot a music video for "Pure Intuition" and did not include it on any of her studio albums.

== Critical reception ==
"Las de la Intuición" received mostly positive reviews from music critics. Hugo Fernández of La Higuera picked it as his favorite track from Fijación Oral, Vol. 1, calling it a "fantastic" and "very catchy" song. Spence D. of IGN compared it with the electronic-sounding Madonna songs, while Mark Kemp of Paste said it was similar to Gloria Estefan music. Mireia Pería of Spanish website Jenesaispop said that she liked the track despite not being a fan of Shakira. She also felt that Javiera Mena's song "Intuición" was a homage to Shakira. Raquel Piñeiro of Vanity Fair España named it the seventh best Shakira single in Spanish, while El Comercio considered it an emblematic song in the singer's career. Gastón González Napoli of Uruguayan website Moog praised the artist's voice as powerful and instantly recognizable, and called it a better counterpart of her 2017 single "Me Enamoré". The verse "Yo me propongo ser de ti, un volcán hoy" (I intend to be yours, a volcano today) was noted by some critics. Alejandro Gómez Lizarraga of Los 40 included it on his list of Shakira's craziest song lyrics, stating that "Shakira is a spirited woman. Nobody has a doubt about it. Not even herself." The Houston Chronicle cited it as an example of the album's "alternately obtuse and poetic" lyrics, while Jenesaispop's staff ranked it at number 91 on their list of Top 100 Shakira phrases. "Las de la Intuición" was nominated for Best Latin Song on Los Premios 40 Principales 2007 and was one of the recipients of a BMI Latin Award in the ceremony of 2010.

On the other hand, Erik Roggeveen of Dutch website Videoclips rated "Las de la Intuición" with one star out of five, deeming it as "weirdly bad" and saying that "everything that makes Shakira's songs so fun and authentic is replaced here by a boom-boom beat and a very simple chorus." He also called "Pure Intuition" an annoying song and added that both versions had a "terrible Eurohouse beat in the background". David Ventura of Nou Diari accused the singer of plagiarizing the bassline of the song from U2's "New Year's Day" (1983), while Andy Gill of The Independent considered the track's arrangements "blandly mainstream".

== Chart performance ==
=== "Las de la Intuición" ===
In Spain, "Las de la Intuición" was a commercial success. It topped the Airplay chart for three non-consecutive weeks and became the song of the summer in Spain in 2007 given its popularity on the radio around that time. It topped the airplay list Los 40 Principales during eight non-consecutive weeks. The track also peaked at number 9 on the Download chart and number 2 on the Original Tones list. It received a Platinum certification by the Productores de Música de España (PROMUSICAE) for 40,000 digital units sold, and another five-times Platinum certification for 100,000 ringtones sold. "Las de la Intuición" was the second most-played track on radio stations, the ninth best-selling ringtone and the twenty-ninth most-downloaded song in Spain during 2007. According to iTunes Spain, it was the third most-downloaded song on the store in 2007.

On the Russian Top Radio Hits chart, the song spent twenty-eight weeks, peaking at number 16. In Venezuela, the track reached number 18 on the Top Latino chart and number 8 on the Pop/Rock list. In the United States, the song made its debut at number 40 on Billboard Latin Pop Songs chart on the issued dated 22 July 2006. It peaked at number 16, spending nineteen weeks on the chart. "Las de la Intuición" entered the Billboard's Hot Latin Songs chart at number 48 on the issue dated 22 September 2007, becoming Shakira's thirteenth entry there. It later peaked at number 31.

=== "Pure Intuition" ===
"Pure Intuition" was a commercial success in Spain. It topped the Downloads chart and peaked at number 2 on the Original Tones list. In March 2007, it became one of the first songs to receive a Platinum certification for digital downloads and a double-Platinum certification for original tones sold by PROMUSICAE. "Pure Intuition" was the fourth most-downloaded track and the fifth best-selling ringtone in Spain during 2007. It has been certified ten-times Platinum for 200,000 ringtones sold, and seven-times Platinum for 140,000 digital copies sold in Spain by PROMUSICAE. According to iTunes Spain, it was the fifth most-downloaded song on the store in 2007. In Netherlands, "Pure Intuition" debuted at number 48 on the Single Top 100 chart. On its seventh week, it reached number 6. It spent seventeen weeks on that chart and was the forty-third best-selling single of 2007 in the country. On the Dutch Top 40 chart, "Pure Intuition" peaked at number 8, spending twelve weeks on the chart. On the Romanian Top 100, "Pure Intuition" spent two non-consecutive weeks at its peak position of number 6. On Billboard's Euro Digital Tracks, the single debuted at number 15 on the issue dated 17 March 2007. It spent eleven weeks on that chart, peaking at number 9. "Pure Intuition" also entered Slovakia's Rádio Top 100, where it reached the twenty-ninth position.

== Music video ==
Shakira in the music video for "Las de la Intuición", where she holds a guitar and wears a purple wig and black corset. Some critics considered the video one of the singer's sexiest clips due to the outfits.

The music video for "Las de la Intuición" was filmed in Miami, Florida, under the direction of Shakira and Spanish photographer Jaume de Laiguana. The concept of the clip was developed by the singer, who was inspired by the work of German-Australian photographer Helmut Newton. Before its release, her publicists announced that she would appear with a new look, stating that, "Shakira has appeared with brown, red, straight and curly hair, but she has never been seen with a look like this." The video depicts Shakira wearing a purple wig, garter belts and high heels while performing and dancing to the track in different outfits, such as a black corset, miniskirts, and a school-girl uniform. In the first verse, the singer is looking at a mirror while applying perfume and lipstick. During the next verse, she holds a guitar and performs a choreography alongside four dancers dressed similarly to her. Later, they keep on dancing while showing in some occasions their underwear. By the end of the clip, she appears leaning against a layer of plastic and performing the track with a microphone. It premiered worldwide on 7 May 2007, and was released on the iTunes Store seven days later. It was also included as a bonus clip on Shakira's third live album Oral Fixation Tour (2007). Both the guitar and wig Shakira used in the music video were sold at auction in 2008 for US$3301.50, in benefit of the singer's Barefoot Foundation.

Music critics gave the visual a positive response, with many of them deeming it as one of Shakira's sexiest music videos because of her outfits. Soon after its release, Diario Digital noted the clip's sexual imagery, and speculated that it might become controversial. The staff of Colombian newspaper El Heraldo published an article about Shakira's career, where they considered that the artist started to showcase a sexier facet with the release of the clip. A reviewer of Argentine website Minuto Uno commented that Shakira took the role of a femme fatale for the video and praised her outfits. Mexican magazine Quién wrote that Shakira "impressed them again" because she was not afraid to wear lingerie such as garter belts. El País complimented the singer's looks, while El Tiempo considered "Las de la Intuición" as an iconic clip in Shakira's videography. Aridiana Banos of El Universal Querétaro wrote that the clip had fetishism themes, citing as examples the wig, the singer's outfits and the use of plastic. Erik Roggeveen of Dutch website Videoclips rated "Las de la Intuición" with two stars out of five, writing that it lacked the "polished aspect" of the singer's previous clips. He also criticized the choreography and the use of plastic layer, considering the latter as a low-budget scene that seemed inspired from a "weird Japanese fetish". Roggeveen concluded that, even though it may stand out from other clips, it was her worst music video since "Whenever, Wherever" (2001).

== Live performances ==
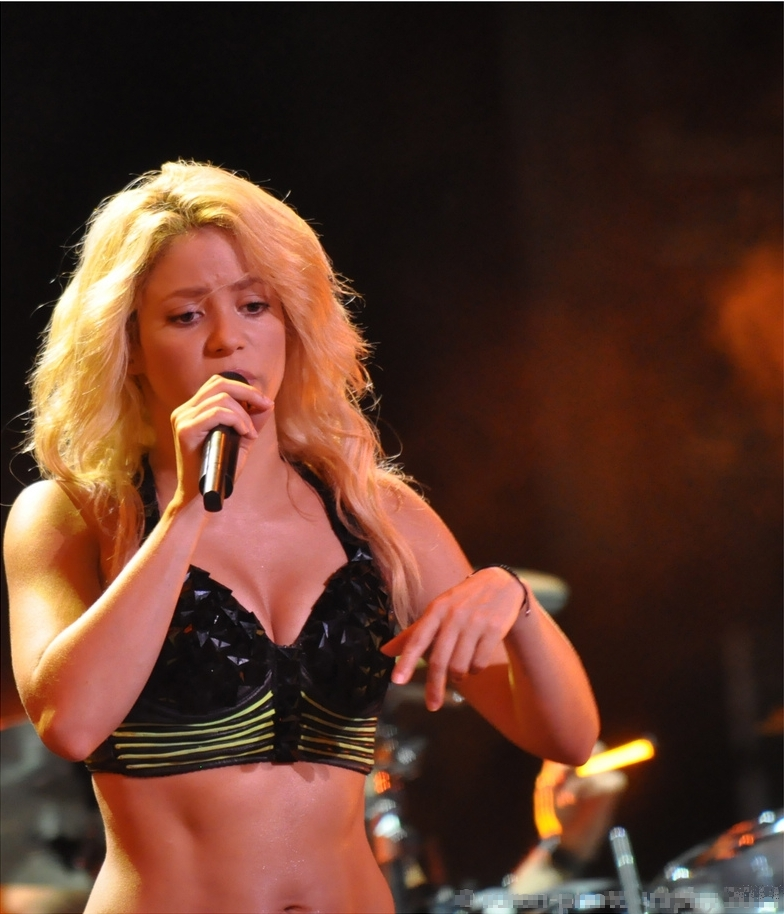
Shakira performing the song on The Sun Comes Out World Tour in Singapore

Shakira performed "Las de la Intuición" on the first episode of 2007 of American TV show Sábado Gigante. On 4 July 2008, she sang the track during her show on the festival Rock in Rio in Arganda del Rey, Spain. She also performed it on the same festival for the 2010 and 2011 editions that were held respectively in Lisbon, Portugal and Rio de Janeiro, Brazil.

Shakira included "Las de la Intuición" on the set list of the Sale el Sol World Tour (2010–11), her fifth concert tour. For the performance of the track, she wore black tights and a black-and-green top. Regarding the show on Glasgow, Scotland, a reviewer of The Scotsman said that the performance of "Las de la Intuición" was among the most impressive moments of the concert. Miguel González of Excélsior commented that Shakira seemed worn out while performing the track during the concert offered in Singapore because of the humidity of the place. Marta Palacios of Las Provincias reviewed the show held in Valencia, Spain, saying that the change of clothing during "Las de la Intuición" lead to "another sexy moment of the concert". The performance of the song in Paris, France, on 14 June 2011 was included on Live from Paris (2011), Shakira's fourth live album. The same concert was aired by TNT on 9 December 2011. The song was not included on the set list of El Dorado World Tour (2018), the singer's sixth concert tour. A reviewer of Spanish daily newspaper El Comercio expressed disappointment over the omission of some of Shakira's most successful singles, such as "Las de la Intuición", "Ciega, Sordomuda" and "Ojos Así". The song would make its return in the 'Las Mujeres Ya No Lloran World Tour', acting as the third song in the setlist.

== Cover versions and compilations ==
In 2008, "Las de la Intuición" was covered on the sixth season of Spanish musical contest Operación Triunfo by contestants Esther Aranda and Tania G. The rendition was panned by the judges, including Risto Mejide, who deemed it as one of the worst and most appalling performances of Operación Triunfo. Similarly, it is considered by some publications as the worst performance in the history of the show. "Las de la Intuición" has been covered on the Spanish musical 40: El Musical, which includes around 100 songs that have topped the Los 40 Principales ranking in the country. It premiered on 15 October 2009 at the Teatro Rialto Movistar in Madrid, Spain, and has been performed more recently in Mexico during 2018. Silvia Abril performed "Las de la Intuición" during the final show of the fourth season of Spanish musical contest Tu cara me suena in 2016. In 2018, Katheryn Venegas covered the track on the eleventh season of Mexican talent show La Academia. Judge Edith Márquez praised her performance, saying that it was the first time she could understand the lyrics of the song due to Shakira's bad diction. This opinion garnered Márquez many negative comments on social media by the singer's fans.

Due to its popularity in Europe, "Pure Intuition" was included on some compilation albums, such as Het Beste uit de Top 40 2007, Hitzone, Vol. 40 and Now, Vol. 17 (Portugal), all released in 2007. Meanwhile, "Las de la Intuition" became part of many Spanish compilations released in 2007, including Los n° 1 de 40, Ñ: Los éxitos del año 2007, and Superventas 07.

== Track listings ==
Digital download

- Remixes Part 1 — EP
1. "Las de la Intuición" (John Jacobsen Epic Space Pacha Red Remix) — 10:08
2. "Las de la Intuición" (Rox & Taylor Pacha Red Remix) — 10:25
- Remixes Part 2 — EP
1. "Las de la Intuición" (Peak Hour Richard Grey Pacha Red Mix) — 5:46
2. "Las de la Intuición" (daZZla Late Night After Hours Mix Pacha Black Mix) — 6:08
3. "Las de la Intuición" (RLS Pacha Red Remix) — 8:38
4. "Las de la Intuición" (Zoned Out Mix Spanish) — 6:29
5. "Las de la Intuición" (Zoned Out Remix English) — 6:27
- Remixes Part 3 — EP
1. "Las de la Intuición" (English Radio Jason Herd Mix) — 2:52
2. "Las de la Intuición" (Jim 'Shaft' Ryan Zoned Out Radio English) — 3:01
3. "Las de la Intuición" (Jim 'Shaft' Ryan Zoned Out Radio Spanish) — 2:59
4. "Las de la Intuición" (RLS Glamour Radio Mix) — 3:13
5. "Las de la Intuición" (Spanish Radio Jason Herd Mix) — 2:52

CD Single – Pure Intuition

1. "Pure Intuition" – 3:40

== Credits and personnel ==
Credits adapted from the liner notes of Fijación Oral, Vol. 1

- Shakira – songwriting, production, lead vocals, background vocals
- Luis Fernando Ochoa – songwriting, additional production, guitars, keys
- Lester Mendez – additional production, programming, keys
- Rob Jacobs – engineering
- Kevin Killen – engineering
- Pete Davis – programming, french horn
- Felipe Álvarez – programming
- Lyle Workman – guitars
- Paul Bushnell – bass guitar

== Charts ==
=== Weekly charts ===
Weekly chart performance for "Las de la Intuición"
Chart (2007–2008)	Peak position
CIS (TopHit)	16
Russia Airplay (TopHit)	8
Spain Airplay (PROMUSICAE)	1
Spain Download (PROMUSICAE)	9
Spain Original Tones (PROMUSICAE)	2
Ukraine Airplay (TopHit)	40
US Hot Latin Songs (Billboard)	31
US Latin Pop Airplay (Billboard)	16
Venezuela Pop Rock (Record Report)	8
Venezuela Top Latino (Record Report)	18

Weekly chart performance for "Pure Intuition"
Chart (2007)	Peak position
Euro Digital Tracks (Billboard)	9
Italy (Musica e Dischi)	39
Netherlands (Dutch Top 40)	8
Netherlands (Single Top 100)	6
Romania (Romanian Top 100)	6
Slovakia (Rádio Top 100)	29
Spain Download (PROMUSICAE)	1
Spain Original Tones (PROMUSICAE)	2

2011 weekly chart performance for "Las de la Intuición"
Chart (2011)	Peak position
Russia Airplay (TopHit)	124
Ukraine Airplay (TopHit)	74

2025 weekly chart performance for "Las de la Intuición"
Chart (2025)	Peak position
Ecuador (Billboard)	19

=== Year-end charts ===
Year-end chart performance for "Las de la Intuición"
Chart (2007)	Position
CIS (Tophit)	74
Russia Airplay (TopHit)	66
Lebanon (Airplay Top 100)	76
Spain Airplay (PROMUSICAE)	2
Spain Download (PROMUSICAE)	29
Spain Original Tones (PROMUSICAE)	5

Year-end chart performance for "Pure Intuition"
Chart (2007)	Position
Netherlands (Dutch Top 40)	42
Netherlands (Single Top 100)	43
Romania (Romanian Top 100)	71
Spain Download (PROMUSICAE)	4
Spain Original Tones (PROMUSICAE)	5

== Certifications ==
Certifications for "Las de la Intuición"
Region	Certification	Certified units/sales
Mexico (AMPROFON)	2× Diamond+3× Platinum+Gold	810,000^{‡}
Spain (Promusicae)	Platinum	20,000^{*}
Spain (Promusicae) Ringtone	5× Platinum	100,000^{*}
Spain (Promusicae)	Platinum	60,000^{‡}
^{*} Sales figures based on certification alone.^{‡} Sales+streaming figures based on certification alone.

Certifications for "Pure Intuition"
Region	Certification	Certified units/sales
Spain (Promusicae)	7× Platinum	140,000^{*}
Spain (Promusicae) Ringtone	10× Platinum	200,000^{*}
^{*} Sales figures based on certification alone.

== Release history ==
Release dates and formats for "Las de la Intuición"
Region	Date	Version(s)	Format(s)	Label(s)	Ref.
Netherlands	29 January 2007	"Pure Intuition"	CD	Sony BMG	
Spain	24 February 2007	"Las de la Intuición"	Contemporary hit radio	Sony BMG	
Hungary	28 February 2007	"Pure Intuition"	Digital download	Sony BMG	
Russia	16 August 2007	"Las de la Intuición"	Contemporary hit radio	Sony BMG	
Spain	February–March 2008	"Las de la Intuición"	Four 12-inch vinyls	Pacha	
Various	5 June 2009	"Las de la Intuición"	Digital download: (EP 1; EP 2; EP 3)	Pacha	
Various	12 September 2009	"Las de la Intuición"	Digital download (remixes)	Central Station	

== See also ==
- List of best-selling singles in Spain
