= Oral Fixation Tour (album) =

Live album by Shakira
- Released: 12 November 2007
- Recorded: 9 December 2006 (Miami, Florida); 15 December 2006 (San Juan, Puerto Rico)
- Venues: AmericanAirlines Arena, Miami, Florida, United States; José Miguel Agrelot Coliseum, San Juan, Puerto Rico
- Genres: Latin pop; dance-pop; pop rock
- Length: 83:13
- Languages: English; Spanish; Arabic
- Label: Epic
- Director: Nick Wickham
- Producer: Tim Mitchell

Shakira chronology
Oral Fixation, Vol. 1 & 2 (2006)	Oral Fixation Tour (2007)	She Wolf (2009)

Shakira video chronology
Oral Fixation, Vol. 1 & 2 (2006)	Oral Fixation Tour (2007)	Live from Paris (2011)

Oral Fixation Tour is the third live album by Colombian singer-songwriter Shakira, released on 12 November 2007, by Epic Records. It was recorded during her concerts in Miami, Florida and San Juan, Puerto Rico as part of her Oral Fixation Tour (2006–07). The first disc is a DVD that features recordings of the performances from the tour. Disc 2 is a CD composed of 6 live recordings, the first being the concert's intro, from the concert.

== Background ==
On this concert, Shakira had Alejandro Sanz as a guest and they performed together their 2005 smash hit "La Tortura". Wyclef Jean was also a guest and performed the 2006 worldwide hit "Hips Don't Lie" with Shakira. Shakira demonstrates her abilities as a musician playing the guitar during "Don't Bother" and "Inevitable", as well as the harmonica during "Te Dejo Madrid". The wardrobe Shakira wore on the concert was designed by Shakira and the prestigious designer Roberto Cavalli. The stage was designed by Shakira and Spanish visual artist Jaume de Laiguana. The Blu-ray edition was released 12 December 2007. The audio was recorded and mixed in stereo and 5.1 by Gustavo Celis. The live album quickly shot up the Mexican charts, peaking at number 1 for two non-consecutive weeks, and remained in the top 10 for over 11 weeks. Contrary to "Live & Off the Record", which was successful in Australia, certifying Gold, this release has not been promoted and did not chart there.

This DVD was marketed in a very unusual way. Instead of launching one or two singles to the radio or TV, they released almost all of the videos online to different top-visited websites, such as MySpace, People en Español, MTV, Yahoo, and MSN, with usually one or two videos on each website.

== Track listing ==
DVD / Blu-ray track listing
No.	Title	Writer(s)	Length
1.	"Intro"	Shakira	2:02
2.	"Estoy Aqui"	Shakira, Luis F. Ochoa	4:25
3.	"Te Dejo Madrid"	Shakira, Tim Mitchell	3:02
4.	"Don't Bother"	Shakira, Lauren Christy, Scott Spock, Graham Edwards, Heather Reid, Leisha Hailey	4:44
5.	"Antologia"	Shakira, Luis F. Ochoa	4.52
6.	"Hey you"	Shakira, Tim Mitchell	4:05
7.	"Inevitable"	Shakira, Ochoa	4:08
8.	"Si Te Vas"	Shakira, Ochoa	4:25
9.	"La Tortura" (Feat. Alejandro Sanz)	Shakira, Ochoa	4:49
10.	"No"	Shakira, Lester Mendez	6:31
11.	"Whenever, Wherever"	Shakira, Gloria Estefan, Tim Mitchell	9:49
12.	"La Pared" (contains elements of Band Introduction)	Shakira, Mendez	4:35
13.	"Underneath Your Clothes"	Shakira, Mendez	4:05
14.	"Pies Descalzos, Sueños Blancos"	Shakira, Ochoa	3:05
15.	"Ciega, Sordomuda"	Estefano Salgado, Shakira	7:24
16.	"Ojos Así"	Javier Garza, Pablo Florez, Shakira	7:25
17.	"Hips Don't Lie" (Feat. Wyclef Jean)	Wyclef Jean, Shakira, Oscar Arfanno, LaTravia Parker	7:11
18.	"Credits" (contains excerpts of "Hips Don't Lie")		3:21
Total length:			83:13

Bonus Videos
No.	Title	Length
19.	"Obtener Un Sí" (Live)	3:34
20.	"La Pared" (Live Video Clip)	3:49
21.	"Las De La Intuición" (Video Clip)	3:38
Total length:		93:34

Disc 2: CD track listing
No.	Title	Writer(s)	Length
1.	"Intro"	Shakira	2:02
2.	"Estoy Aqui"	Shakira, Luis F. Ochoa	4:25
3.	"Don't Bother"	Shakira, Lauren Christy, Scott Spock, Graham Edwards, Heather Reid, Leisha Hailey	4:44
4.	"Inevitable"	Shakira, Ochoa	4:08
5.	"La Pared" (contains elements of Band Introduction)	Shakira, Mendez	4:35
6.	"Hips Don't Lie" (Feat. Wyclef Jean)	Wyclef Jean, Shakira, Oscar Arfanno, LaTravia Parker	7:11
Total length:			26:25

Spanish/Latin American/Walmart exclusive fan pack edition track listing.

Disc 1: DVD / Blu-ray track listing
No.	Title	Writer(s)	Length
1.	"Intro"	Shakira	2:02
2.	"Estoy Aqui"	Shakira, Luis F. Ochoa	4:25
3.	"Te Dejo Madrid"	Shakira, Tim Mitchell	3:02
4.	"Don't Bother"	Shakira, Lauren Christy, Scott Spock, Graham Edwards, Heather Reid, Leisha Hailey	4:44
5.	"Antologia"	Shakira, Luis F. Ochoa	4.52
6.	"Hey you"	Shakira, Tim Mitchell	4:05
7.	"Inevitable"	Shakira, Ochoa	4:08
8.	"Si Te Vas"	Shakira, Ochoa	4:25
9.	"La Tortura" (Feat. Alejandro Sanz)	Shakira, Ochoa	4:49
10.	"No"	Shakira, Lester Mendez	6:31
11.	"Whenever, Wherever"	Shakira, Gloria Estefan, Tim Mitchell	9:49
12.	"La Pared" (contains elements of Band Introduction)	Shakira, Mendez	4:35
13.	"Underneath Your Clothes"	Shakira, Mendez	4:05
14.	"Pies Descalzos, Sueños Blancos"	Shakira, Ochoa	3:05
15.	"Ciega, Sordomuda"	Estefano Salgado, Shakira	7:14
16.	"Ojos Así"	Javier Garza, Pablo Florez, Shakira	7:35
17.	"Hips Don't Lie" (Feat. Wyclef Jean)	Wyclef Jean, Shakira, Oscar Arfanno, LaTravia Parker	7:11
18.	"Credits" (contains excerpts of "Hips Don't Lie")		3:21
Total length:			83:13

Bonus Videos
No.	Title	Length
19.	"Día de Enero" (Video Clip)	2:56
20.	"Obtener Un Sí" (Live)	3:34
21.	"La Pared" (Live Video Clip)	3:49
22.	"Las De La Intuición" (Video Clip)	3:38
Total length:		95:09

Disc 2: DVD 2
No.	Title	Length
1.	"Around the World in 397 Days"	11:23
2.	"Pies Descalzos Foundation"	21:19
Total length:		32:42

Disc 3: CD track listing
No.	Title	Writer(s)	Length
1.	"Intro"	Shakira	2:02
2.	"Estoy Aqui"	Shakira, Luis F. Ochoa	4:25
3.	"Don't Bother"	Shakira, Lauren Christy, Scott Spock, Graham Edwards, Heather Reid, Leisha Hailey	4:44
4.	"Hey you" (bonus track)	Shakira, Tim Mitchell	4:05
5.	"Obtener Un Sí" (bonus track)	Shakira, Mendez	3:34
6.	"Inevitable"	Shakira, Ochoa	4:08
7.	"La Pared" (contains elements of Band Introduction)	Shakira, Mendez	4:35
8.	"Hips Don't Lie" (Feat. Wyclef Jean)	Wyclef Jean, Shakira, Oscar Arfanno, LaTravia Parker	7:11
Total length:			33:64

== Charts ==
Professional ratings
Review scores
Source	Rating
Allmusic	3.5/5 stars

This release has been very well received by critics. Various sources have commended Shakira's multi-instrumentalism. The release has charted highly in the United States and Europe, but has not charted in Australia.

Country	Peak position	Certification	Sales/shipments
US Top Music Videos	6	Platinum	100.000+
Brazil	1	Platinum	30.000
Chile (Video)	—	3× Platinum	
Colombia (Physical sales)	1	Platinum	-
Mexico	1	Platinum	100.000
Spain	1	2× Platinum	160.000
Germany	1		
Netherlands	1		
Austria	6		
France	9		
Argentina	1	Platinum	40,000
Greece	4		
Italy	3		
Belgium Flanders	4		
Belgium Wallonie	8		
Portugal	3	Gold	
