= La Pared =

2006 single by Shakira

Single by Shakira

from the album Fijación Oral, Vol. 1
- Language: Spanish
- English title: "The Wall"
- Released: 17 October 2006
- Studio: Criteria Studios (Miami, FL)
- Genre: Pop rock; alternative
- Length: 3:20 (album version); 2:41 (acoustic version)
- Label: Epic
- Composers: Shakira; Lester Mendez
- Lyricist: Shakira
- Producer: Shakira

Shakira singles chronology
"Hips Don't Lie" (2006)	"La Pared" (2006)	"Illegal" (2006)

Live videos
- "La Pared" (Mexico City) on YouTube; "La Pared" (Miami & San Juan) on YouTube

"La Pared" (English: The Wall) is a song written, produced and performed by Colombian singer-songwriter Shakira. It was released as the fourth single following "Día de Enero" from her sixth studio album Fijación Oral, Vol. 1 (2005) in Latin America and Spain on 17 October 2006. "La Pared" is a pop rock song composed by Shakira and Lester Mendez, who also served as assistant producer. The song garnered positive reviews from music critics, who praised its impactful lyrics and highlighted Shakira's vocal prowess.

== Background and release ==
"I used to write on airplanes or after getting out of the shower, but now I need privacy to express my feelings."

— Shakira on recording Fijación Oral, Vol. 1.

After the Tour of the Mongoose ended in 2003, Shakira started to work on her next album. She rented an estate in Alcalá de Henares, Madrid, Spain, where she wrote many of the songs on Fijación Oral, Vol. 1, including "La Pared", "La Tortura", and "Las de la Intuición". "La Pared" was initially released on the European CD maxi-single release of "La Tortura" where the acoustic version of the song is featured, and which was released the month before the album in May 2005.

"La Pared" is a mid-tempo Latin pop rock song. Written and composed entirely by Shakira, the song lyrically explores themes of a fractured relationship, depth of emotions, and moving on from heartbreak. The song also has an acoustic version, in which the only instrument featured is a piano. Shakira performed the acoustic version at the 2006 Latin Grammy Awards, with the performance dubbed by ¡Hola! magazine one of the highlights of the night, on the Oral Fixation Tour in 2006–2007, and at Rock in Rio Lisboa IV and Rock in Rio Madrid II in 2010. An instrumental clip of the song featuring cello as the only instrument was used on Shakira's Elixir perfume commercial. The song is dedicated to Shakira's then-boyfriend Antonio de la Rúa.

"La Pared" was released as the fourth single off Fijación Oral, Vol. 1 in October 2006 in Latin America and Spain. The music video for the song was released in November 2006. After being released, the single received substantial airplay at the Spanish-speaking countries' Los 40 radio network, becoming their most played song at the turn of the year 2006–2007, and Shakira's seventh top song on the network. The single also reached the top spot on the Spanish Cadena 100 AC radio station.

== Reception ==
Overall, "La Pared" was positively rated by critics, receiving praise for its powerful lyrics, and for showcasing Shakira's vocals. Mariana Enriquez from Página 12 commented that the song sounds like Coldplay but better and that both the main and the acoustic versions of the song are "irresistible" and the song is worth being released as a single. Mariana Enriquez from La Nación delineates the song as a "gem with a catchy and desperate chorus", noting the production's similarity to Coldplay's "Clocks", but emphasizing that Shakira's song is "less solemn and simpler", and praises the acoustic version. A review by Batanga Magazine also noted the song's similarity to "Clocks" and discussed Shakira's "detached coolness" while singing about "love's painful addiction". Matt Cibula from PopMatters reflected that the song has sonic elements reminiscent of those of 1980's music, in particular that of Eurythmics'. In a concert review, Billboard staff described "La Pared" as "slightly jazzy" and commented that she really showcases her vocals while performing the song, while their album review found the song "evocative and powerful". Spence D. from IGN described that Shakira's delivery on the song has "over-the-top theatricality". Hugo Fernández from La Higuera called the song "one of the stars" of the album.

== Music video ==
The music video for "La Pared" is a live video of Shakira performing the song, accompanied by a piano. It was filmed during two concerts on October 7 and 8 at Palacio de los Deportes in Mexico City, Mexico. The video was co-directed by Shakira and Catalan visual artist Jaume de Laiguana. The video features Shakira sitting on a stool beside the piano performing the song as the Mexican crowd waves their hands back and forth and holds up lit lighters. The video is also featured on the live album Oral Fixation Tour, alongside another performance of the song filmed in late 2006 for the tour video in Miami, Florida and San Juan, Puerto Rico.

The music video saw success on the Mexican RitmoSon music video channel, reaching the fourth spot.
