= List of best-selling singles in Canada =

This is a list of best selling singles in Canada based on sources such as Nielsen Soundscan Canada and Canadian music certifications.

== Best-selling singles ==
Artist	Song	Year	Sales, sales with streaming or shipments	Certifications
Elton John	"Candle in the Wind 1997"	1997	1,900,000	19× Platinum (Diamond)
Ed Sheeran	"Perfect"	2017	1,600,000^{‡}	2× Diamond
Ed Sheeran	"Shape of You"	2017	1,600,000^{‡}	2× Diamond
Lewis Capaldi	"Someone You Loved"	2018	1,600,000^{‡}	2× Diamond
LMFAO featuring Lauren Bennett and GoonRock	"Party Rock Anthem"	2011	862,000	6× Platinum
Shakira	"Hips Don't Lie"	2006	840,000^{‡}	Diamond; Platinum (for ringtone)
Robin Thicke featuring Pharrell Williams and T.I.	"Blurred Lines"	2013	820,000	9× Platinum
Maroon 5 featuring Christina Aguilera	"Moves like Jagger"	2011	810,000	8× Platinum
24kGoldn	"Mood"	2020	800,000^{‡}	Diamond
Adele	"Hello"	2015	800,000^{‡}	Diamond
Adele	"Rolling in the Deep"	2011	785,000/800,000^{‡}	Diamond
Adele	"Set Fire to the Rain"	2011	800,000^{‡}	Diamond
Adele	"Someone like You"	2011	522,000/800,000^{‡}	Diamond
Bebe Rexha	"Meant to Be"	2017	800,000^{‡}	Diamond
Bruno Mars	"Just the Way You Are"	2010	800,000^{‡}	Diamond
Camila Cabello	"Havana"	2017	800,000^{‡}	Diamond
Cardi B	"I Like It"	2018	800,000^{‡}	Diamond
Carly Rae Jepsen	"Call Me Maybe"	2012	701,000/800,000^{‡}	Diamond
The Chainsmokers and Coldplay	"Something Just Like This"	2017	800,000^{‡}	Diamond
DJ Snake	"Let Me Love You"	2016	800,000^{‡}	Diamond
Drake	"God's Plan"	2018	800,000^{‡}	Diamond
Drake	"One Dance"	2016	800,000^{‡}	Diamond
Dua Lipa	"Don't Start Now"	2019	800,000^{‡}	Diamond
Dua Lipa	"Levitating"	2020	800,000^{‡}	Diamond
Ed Sheeran & Justin Bieber	"I Don't Care"	2019	800,000^{‡}	Diamond
Ed Sheeran	"Castle on the Hill"	2015	800,000^{‡}	Diamond
Ed Sheeran	"Bad Habits"	2021	800,000^{‡}	Diamond
Ed Sheeran	"Thinking Out Loud"	2014	800,000^{‡}	Diamond
French Montana	"Unforgettable"	2017	800,000^{‡}	Diamond
Fun. featuring Janelle Monáe	"We Are Young"	2012	518,000/800,000^{‡}	Diamond
Glass Animals	"Heat Waves"	2020	800,000^{‡}	Diamond
Harry Styles	"Watermelon Sugar"	2020	800,000^{‡}	Diamond
Hozier	"Take Me to Church"	2013	800,000^{‡}	2× Diamond
Imagine Dragons	"Radioactive"	2012	800,000^{‡}	Diamond
James Arthur	"Say You Won't Let Go"	2016	800,000^{‡}	Diamond
Justin Timberlake	"Can't Stop the Feeling!"	2016	800,000^{‡}	Diamond
Katy Perry	"Hot n Cold"	2008	800,000^{‡}	Diamond
Katy Perry	"California Gurls" (featuring Snoop Dogg)	2010	800,000^{‡}	Diamond
Katy Perry	"Teenage Dream"	2010	800,000^{‡}	Diamond
Katy Perry	"Firework"	2010	800,000^{‡}	Diamond
Katy Perry	"Last Friday Night (T.G.I.F.)"	2011	800,000^{‡}	Diamond
Katy Perry	"Roar"	2013	800,000^{‡}	Diamond
Katy Perry	"Dark Horse"	2013	800,000^{‡}	Diamond
Kendrick Lamar	"Humble"	2017	800,000^{‡}	Diamond
Lil Nas X	"Old Town Road"	2018	800,000^{‡}	Diamond
Loud Luxury	"Body"	2017	800,000^{‡}	Diamond
Luis Fonsi	"Despacito (remix)"	2017	800,000^{‡}	Diamond
Lukas Graham	"7 Years"	2015	800,000^{‡}	Diamond
Macklemore and Ryan Lewis featuring Wanz	"Thrift Shop"	2012	787,000/800,000^{‡}	Diamond
Mark Ronson featuring Bruno Mars	"Uptown Funk"	2014	768,000/800,000^{‡}	Diamond
Mariah Carey	"All I Want for Christmas Is You"	1994	800,000^{‡}	Diamond
Michael Jackson	"Billie Jean"	1983	800,000^{‡}	Diamond
Milky Chance	"Stolen Dance"	2013	800,000^{‡}	Diamond
Miley Cyrus	"Flowers"	2023	800,000^{‡}	Diamond
Omi	"Cheerleader"	2012	800,000^{‡}	Diamond
OneRepublic	"Counting Stars"	2013	800,000^{‡}	Diamond
Passenger	"Let Her Go"	2012	800,000^{‡}	Diamond
Pharrell Williams	"Happy"	2013	530,000/800,000^{‡}	Diamond
Pink	"Just Give Me a Reason"	2013	800,000^{‡}	Diamond
Post Malone	"Better Now"	2018	800,000^{‡}	Diamond
Post Malone	"Circles"	2019	800,000^{‡}	Diamond
Post Malone	"Congratulations"	2016	800,000^{‡}	Diamond
Post Malone	"I Fall Apart"	2017	800,000^{‡}	Diamond
Post Malone	"Psycho"	2018	800,000^{‡}	Diamond
Post Malone	"Rockstar"	2017	800,000^{‡}	Diamond
Post Malone	"Sunflower"	2018	800,000^{‡}	Diamond
Post Malone	"Wow"	2018	800,000^{‡}	Diamond
Sia	"Cheap Thrills"	2015	800,000^{‡}	Diamond
Shawn Mendes	"Señorita"	2019	800,000^{‡}	Diamond
The Chainsmokers	"Closer"	2016	800,000^{‡}	Diamond
The Lumineers	"Ho Hey"	2012	800,000^{‡}	Diamond
The Weeknd	"Blinding Lights"	2019	800,000^{‡}	Diamond
The Weeknd	"Can't Feel My Face"	2015	800,000^{‡}	Diamond
The Weeknd	"Save Your Tears"	2020	800,000^{‡}	Diamond
The Weeknd	"Starboy"	2018	800,000^{‡}	Diamond
The Weeknd	"The Hills"	2015	800,000^{‡}	Diamond
Tones and I	"Dance Monkey"	2019	800,000^{‡}	Diamond
Travis Scott	"Sicko Mode"	2018	800,000^{‡}	Diamond
Twenty One Pilots	"Heathens"	2016	800,000^{‡}	Diamond
Twenty One Pilots	"Stressed Out"	2015	800,000^{‡}	Diamond
Twisted Sister	"We're Not Gonna Take It"	1984	800,000	8× Platinum
Vance Joy	"Riptide"	2013	800,000^{‡}	Diamond
Wiz Khalifa	"See You Again"	2015	800,000^{‡}	Diamond
Gotye featuring Kimbra	"Somebody That I Used to Know"	2011	760,000	
LMFAO	"Sexy and I Know It"	2011	741,000	2× Platinum
Black Eyed Peas	"I Gotta Feeling"	2009	731,000	10× Platinum (Diamond)
Beyoncé	"Halo"	2009	720,000	9× Platinum
Shakira	"Waka Waka (This Time For Africa)"	2010	640,000	8× Platinum
Lady Gaga and Bradley Cooper	"Shallow"	2018	640,000	8× Platinum

== Notes ==
- ^{‡}Certification include on-demand audio and video streams and track sale equivalent

== See also ==
- List of number-one singles in Canada
