= Gustavo Celis =

American music engineer, mixer and producer

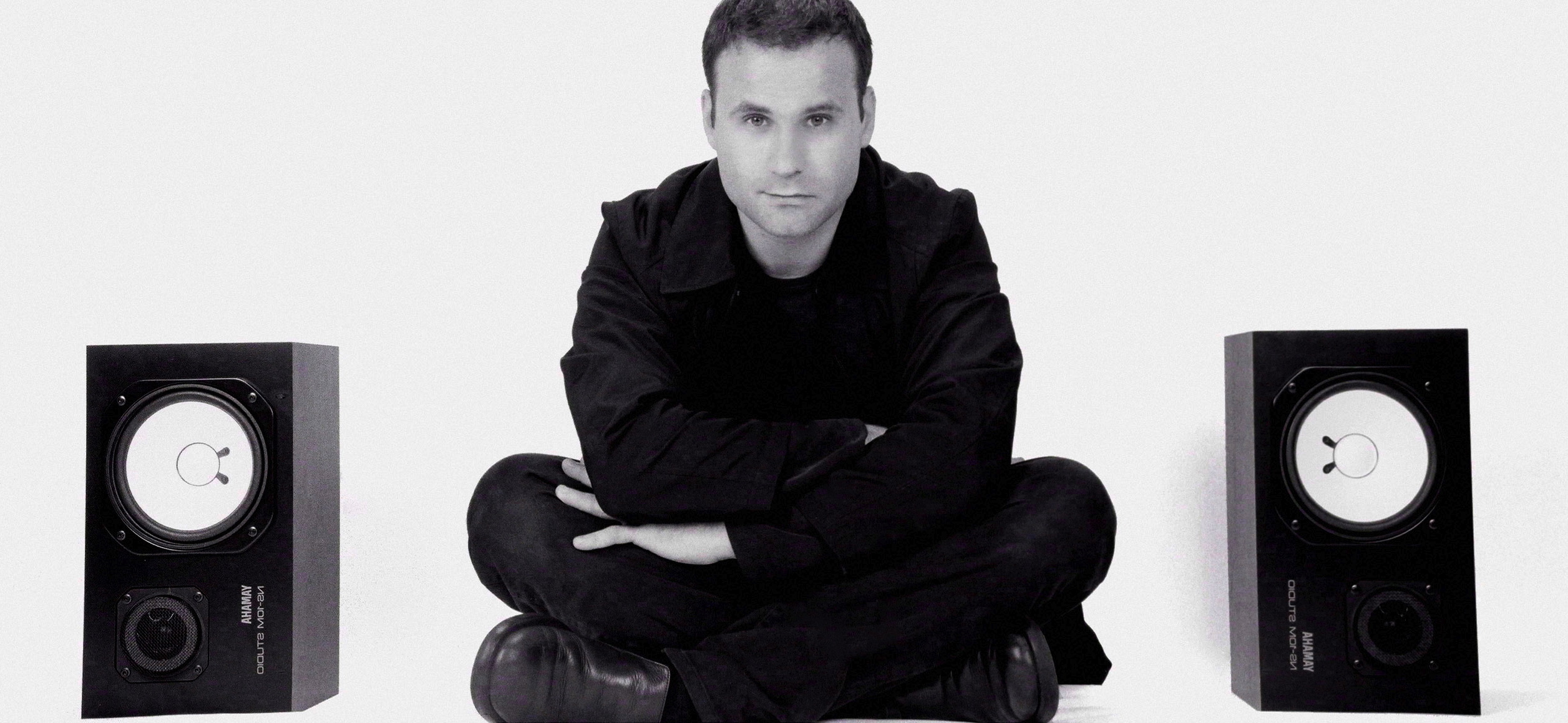

Gustavo Celis is an American music engineer, mixer and producer. He has worked with many prominent names in music including Shakira (he mixed her classic albums Fijación Oral Vol. 1 and Oral Fixation Vol. 2, and singles "La Tortura" and "Don't Bother"), Ricky Martin (he mixed his single "Jaleo" and "Life"), Chicago (he recorded the soundtrack to the motion picture), Gloria Estefan (Caribbean Soul), Beyoncé (B'Day including the single "Beautiful Liar"), and many others.

He has been nominated twice for Mix Foundation's TEC Award, for "Best Record Production" in 2006 and "Best Surround Sound Recording" in 2008. Celis is an alumnus of Berklee College of Music.

== Selection of his work as a mix engineer ==
- She Wolf Album (2009)
- "Give It Up to Me" Single (2009)
- "Did It Again" Single (2009)
- "She Wolf" Single (2009)
- "Cantora 1" Mercedes Sosa (2009)
- Shakira's Fijación Oral Vol. 1 and Oral Fixation Vol. 2 albums and their singles "Don't Bother" and "La Tortura" and Laundry Service
- Ricky Martin's MTV Unplugged, Life, Almas del Silencio and Sound Loaded albums
- Chicago (2002 film)

== Selection of his work as a 5.1 surround mix engineer ==
- Shakira's Oral Fixation Tour (DVD)
