= Live 8 concert, Paris =

Benefit concert

On 2 July 2005 a Live 8 concert was held at the Palace of Versailles.

The event is also referred to as "Live 8 Paris" or "Live 8 France". The concert was broadcast on french radio NRJ and french TV station M6.

== Lineup ==
- Laurent Boyer - (presenter) (V 17:35)
- Passi - "Reviens dans me vie" (V 17:39)
- Faudel - "Je Veux Vivre" (V 17:46)
- Magic System - "Bouger Bouger" (V 17:53)
- Alpha Blondy - "Cocody Rock", "Sweet Fanta Diallo", "Brigadier Sabari" (V 18:01)
- Tina Arena & Craig David - "Come Together" (V 18:18)
- Muse - "Hysteria", "Bliss", "Time Is Running Out", "Plug In Baby" (V 18:26)
- Will Smith (presenter) (V 18:47)
- Kyo - "Contact", "Qui Je Suis" (V 18:57)
- M Pokora - "Elle Me Contrôle" (V 19:09)
- Andrea Bocelli with the Philarmonie der Nationen - "O Surdato 'nnammurato", "The Prayer" (V 19:16)
- Diam's & Amel Bent - "Marine" (V 19:28)
- Raphael - "Caravane" (V 19:36)
- Shakira - " Whenever, Wherever", "La Tortura" (V 19:43)
- Yannick Noah - "Metisse" (with Disiz La Peste), "Saga Africa", "La Voix Des Sages" (V 19:54)
- Tina Arena - "Aller Plus Haut" (V 20:11)
- Raphael - "Ne Partons Pas Faches" (V 20:18)
- Diam's - "Suzy" (V 20:25)
- Calogero - "Prendre racine", "Face A La Mer" (with Passi) (V 20:42)
- Solidarite Sida (presenter) (V 20:53)
- Amel Bent - "Ma philosophie" (V 20:57)
- Craig David - "All The Way", "Fill Me In" (V 21:05)
- David Hallyday - "Le Defi", "My Sharona" (V 21:19)
- Louis Bertignac - "Je joue", "Cendrillon" (V 21:30)
- Cerrone/Nile Rodgers - "Supernature" (with Axelle Red) (V 21:42)
- Axelle Red - "J'ai fait un rêve". "Le Monde Tourne Mal"
- Florent Pagny - "Une Nube Blanca", "Guide me home" (with Patricia Petitbon) (V 21:59)
- Placebo - "The Bitter End", "Twenty Years" (V 22:13)
- Zucchero - "Everybody's Gotta", "Il Volo", "Diavolo In Me" (V 22:26)
- The Cure - "Open", "One Hundred Years", "End", "Just Like Heaven", "Boys Don't Cry" (V 22:43)
- Youssou N'Dour - "7 Seconds" (with Dido), "Africa" (V 23:14)
