= List of number-one Billboard Latin Pop Airplay songs of 2005 =

The most popular Latin pop songs in 2005, ranked by radio airplay audience impressions and measured by Nielsen BDS.

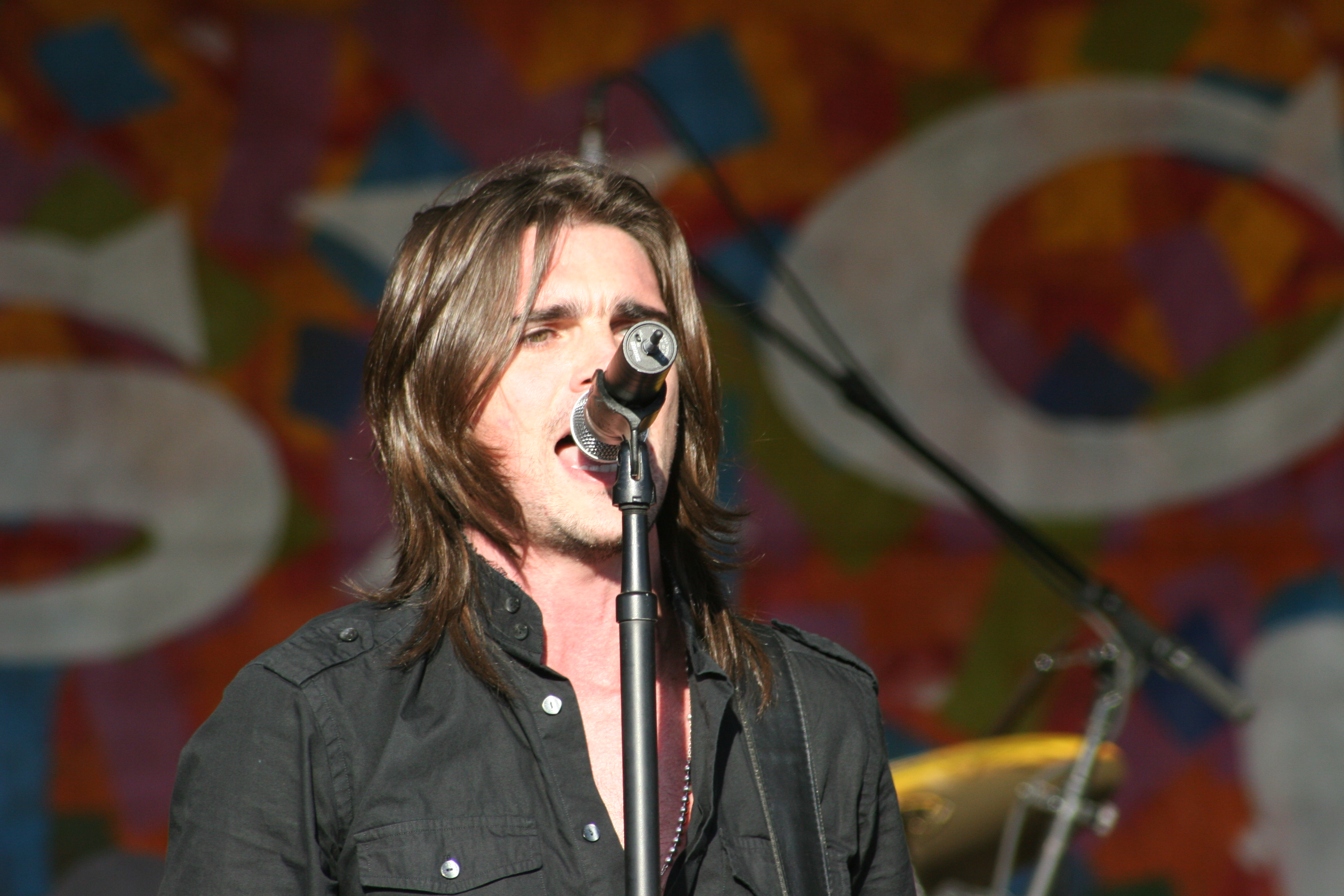
After achieving the longest-running hit in 2004, Singer Juanes reached the #1 position again with the song "Nada Valgo Sin Tu Amor" (Eng: I'm Worthless Without Your Love), spending in the privilege spot for 4 weeks more, adding 19 non-consecutive weeks at #1

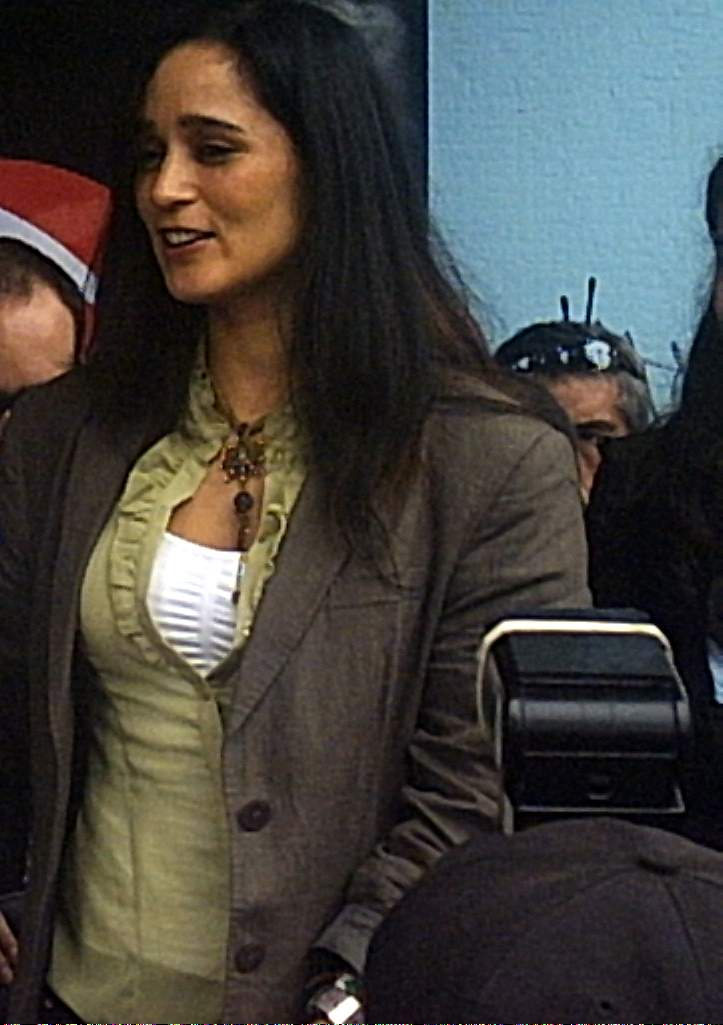
Singer Julieta Venegas earned her first #1 song with the hit "Algo Está Cambiando" (En: Something is changing), reaching the #1 spot for 2 non-consecutive weeks.

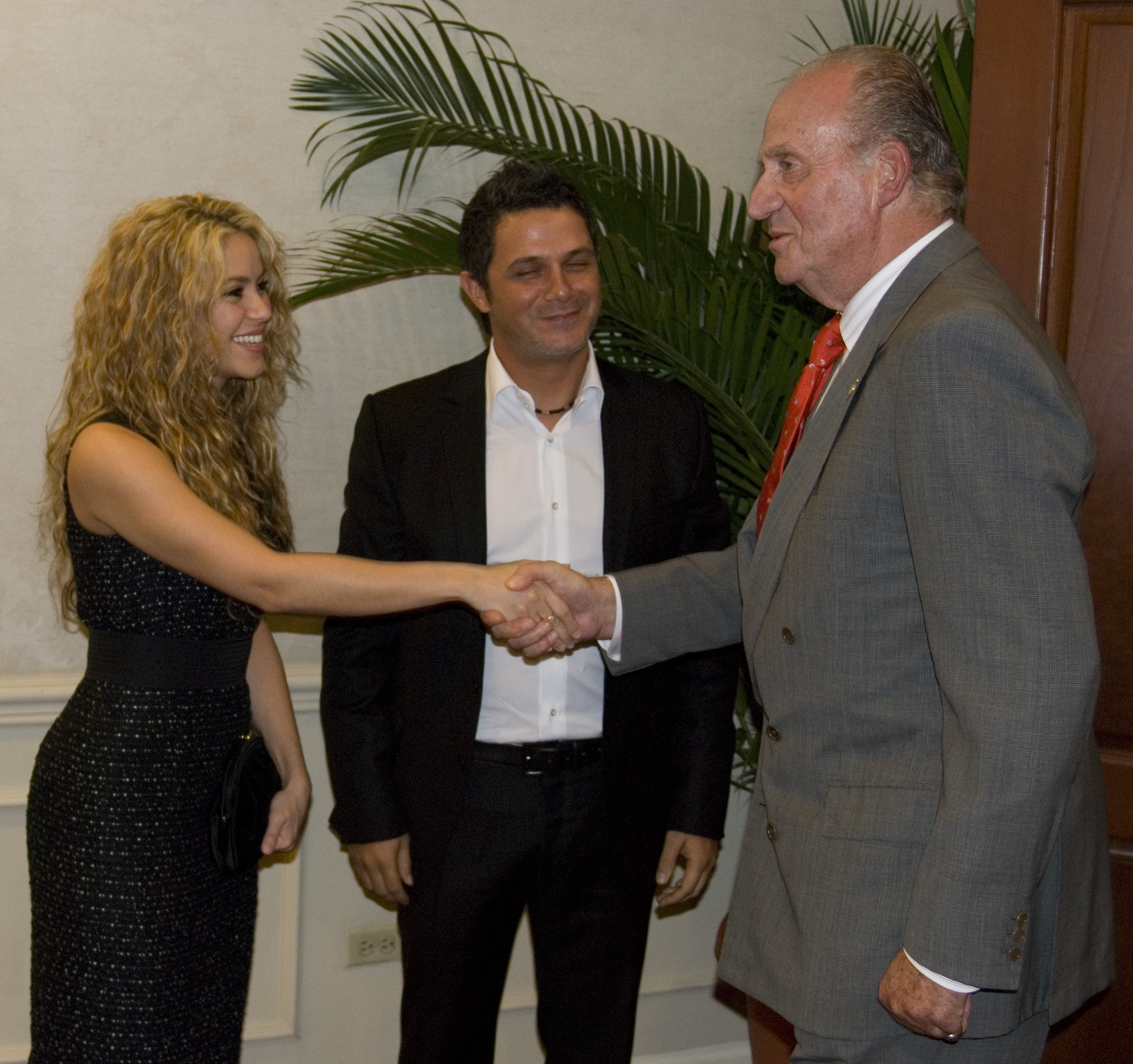
Singer Shakira along with Alejandro Sanz earned a #1 song with the smash hit "La Tortura" (Eng: The torture).

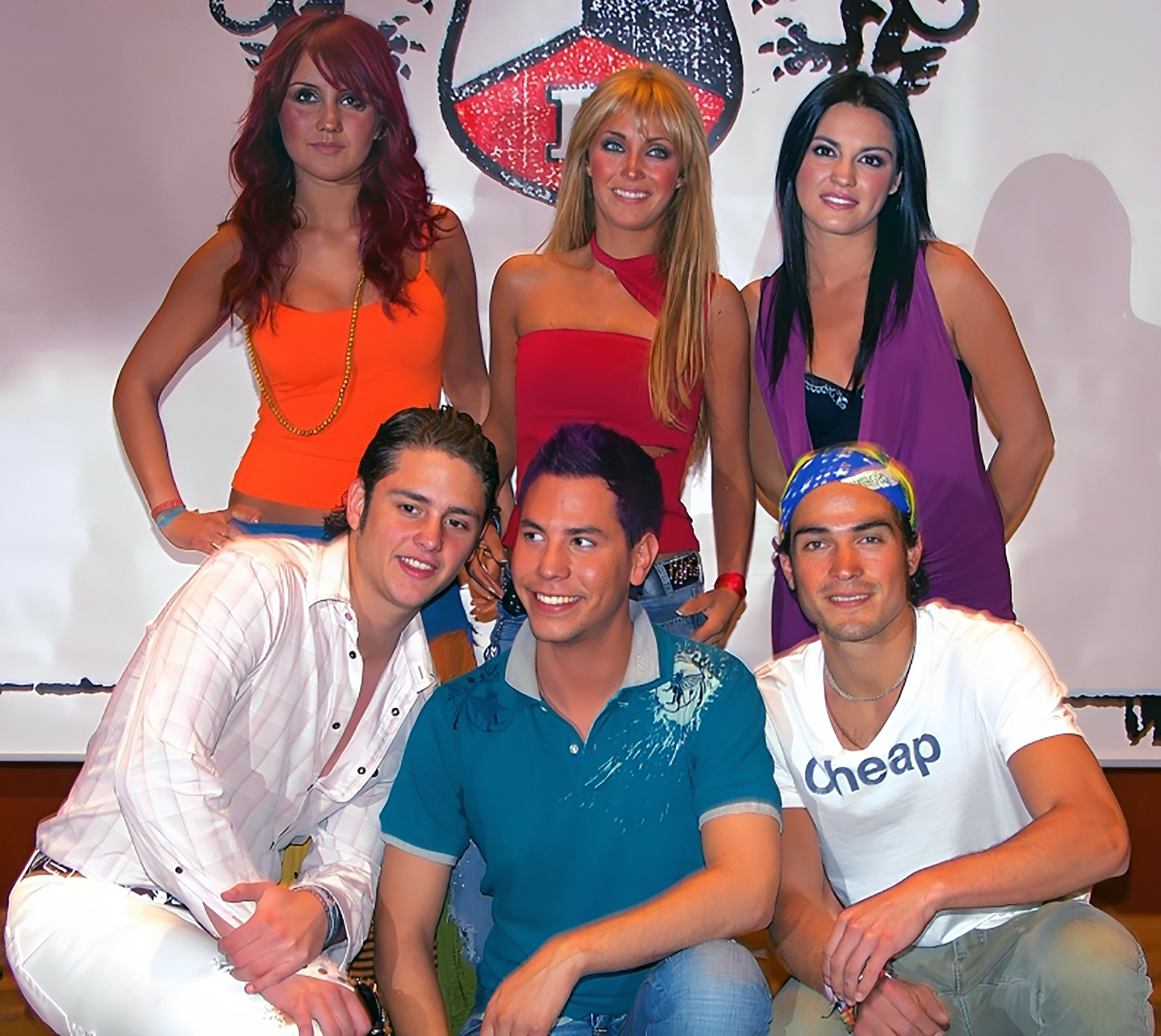
Group RBD reached the #1 position with their song "Solo Quédate En Silencio" (Eng: Just Remain in Silence), spending in the privilege spot for 2 weeks, becoming their first song ever to reach the #1 spot.

Issue date	Song	Artist(s)	Ref.
January 1	"Nada Valgo Sin Tu Amor"	Juanes	
January 8	"Nada Valgo Sin Tu Amor"	Juanes	
January 15	"Nada Valgo Sin Tu Amor"	Juanes	
January 22	"Nada Valgo Sin Tu Amor"	Juanes	
January 29	"Porque Es Tan Cruel El Amor"	Ricardo Arjona	
February 5	"Volverte a Ver"	Juanes	
February 12	"Volverte a Ver"	Juanes	
February 19	"Volverte a Ver"	Juanes	
February 26	"Te Buscaría"	Cristian Castro	
March 5	"Algo Está Cambiando"	Julieta Venegas	
March 12	"Te Buscaría"	Cristian Castro	
March 19	"Te Buscaría"	Cristian Castro	
March 26	"Algo Está Cambiando"	Julieta Venegas	
April 2	"La Camisa Negra"	Juanes	
April 10	"La Camisa Negra"	Juanes	
April 16	"La Camisa Negra"	Juanes	
April 23	"La Camisa Negra"	Juanes	
April 30	"La Camisa Negra"	Juanes	
May 7	"La Camisa Negra"	Juanes	
May 14	"La Camisa Negra"	Juanes	
May 21	"La Camisa Negra"	Juanes	
May 28	"La Camisa Negra"	Juanes	
June 4	"La Camisa Negra"	Juanes	
June 11	"La Tortura"	Shakira featuring Alejandro Sanz	
June 18	"La Tortura"	Shakira featuring Alejandro Sanz	
June 25	"La Tortura"	Shakira featuring Alejandro Sanz	
July 2	"La Tortura"	Shakira featuring Alejandro Sanz	
July 9	"La Tortura"	Shakira featuring Alejandro Sanz	
July 16	"La Tortura"	Shakira featuring Alejandro Sanz	
July 23	"La Tortura"	Shakira featuring Alejandro Sanz	
July 30	"La Tortura"	Shakira featuring Alejandro Sanz	
August 6	"La Tortura"	Shakira featuring Alejandro Sanz	
August 13	"La Tortura"	Shakira featuring Alejandro Sanz	
August 20	"Nada Es Para Siempre"	Luis Fonsi	
August 27	"Nada Es Para Siempre"	Luis Fonsi	
September 3	"Nada Es Para Siempre"	Luis Fonsi	
September 10	"Nada Es Para Siempre"	Luis Fonsi	
September 17	"Nada Es Para Siempre"	Luis Fonsi	
September 24	"Solo Quédate En Silencio"	RBD	
October 1	"Solo Quédate En Silencio"	RBD	
October 8	"Solo Quédate En Silencio"	RBD	
October 15	"Solo Quédate En Silencio"	RBD	
October 22	"Solo Quédate En Silencio"	RBD	
October 29	"Solo Quédate En Silencio"	RBD	
November 5	"Solo Quédate En Silencio"	RBD	
November 12	"No Te Preocupes por Mí"	Chayanne	
November 19	"No Te Preocupes por Mí"	Chayanne	
November 26	"No Te Preocupes por Mí"	Chayanne	
December 3	"No Te Preocupes por Mí"	Chayanne	
December 10	"No Te Preocupes por Mí"	Chayanne	
December 17	"No Te Preocupes por Mí"	Chayanne	
December 24	"Amor Eterno"	Cristian Castro	
December 31	"Amor Eterno"	Cristian Castro	
