= Hips Don't Lie =

2006 single by Shakira featuring Wyclef Jean

Single by Shakira featuring Wyclef Jean

from the album Oral Fixation, Vol. 2
- B-side: "Dreams for Plans"
- Released: 28 February 2006
- Recorded: 2004 (as "Dance Like This"); 2005 (Shakira's vocals)
- Studio: Criteria (Miami); Platinum Sound (New York); La Marimonda (Nassau); Olympic (London); Sonido Azulado (Bogota)
- Genre: Latin pop; reggaeton; salsa; cumbia
- Length: 3:38
- Label: Epic
- Composers: Shakira Mebarak; Nelust Jean; Jerry Duplessis; LaTavia Parker; Archie Pena; Omar Alfanno; Luis Días
- Lyricists: Shakira Mebarak; Nelust Jean
- Producers: Shakira Mebarak; Jerry Duplessis; Wyclef Jean

Shakira singles chronology
"Día de Enero" (2006)	"Hips Don't Lie" (2006)	"La Pared" (2006)

Wyclef Jean singles chronology
"President" (2004)	"Hips Don't Lie" (2006)	"Dangerous" (2006)

Music videos
- "Hips Don't Lie" on YouTube; "Hips Don't Lie" (anniversary version) on YouTube

"Hips Don't Lie" is a song by Colombian singer-songwriter Shakira, featuring Haitian rapper Wyclef Jean, released by Epic Records on 28 February 2006. The single is a reworking of Jean's 2004 track "Dance Like This", therefore it features additional composing credits by Omar Alfanno, Jerry Duplessis, Luis Días, and LaTavia Parker. The song was released as the lead single from the reissue of Shakira's seventh studio album, Oral Fixation, Vol. 2, and second overall. Shakira and Jean wrote the lyrics and jointly composed the music with additional co-writing by Shakira's percussionist Archie Pena. The song was produced by Shakira and Jean with additional production by Jerry Duplessis. The song incorporates samples from "Amores Como el Nuestro" written by Alfanno, and "Carnaval (Baile En La Calle)" written by Días.

Upon its release, "Hips Don't Lie" received favorable reviews from music critics. It received accolades including a People's Choice Award, an MTV Latin America Video Music Award, and an MTV Video Music Award. "Hips Don't Lie" became a global success, reaching number one in 18 countries, including the U.S. Billboard Hot 100, becoming Shakira's first and only number one hit in the United States. It also broke the record for the most radio plays in a single week and the fastest-selling digital download song in the United States. The song was eventually certified quadruple platinum by the Recording Industry Association of America (RIAA), where it has sold over 4 million digital copies and 2 million ringtones. It also topped the charts in Australia, France, Germany, Italy, Netherlands, Switzerland, and the United Kingdom, among other countries. The song had amassed an estimated 13 million downloads by 2017, making it one of the best-selling singles of all time. In 2018, the song was selected as one of the greatest songs by 21st-century women, by National Public Radio, ranked at 65.

== Background and release ==
The idea of making a double project was never planned or premeditated, it just happened. I found myself writing 60 songs and put myself on the mission of selecting my favorite ones, which happened to be 20. And those 20 songs formed this project, Oral Fixation Vol. 1 and 2.

— Shakira talking about both albums

After attaining international success with her fifth studio effort, Laundry Service, in 2001, Shakira opted to create a two-part follow-up record. Having co-written nearly sixty songs, she put herself "on the mission of selecting [her] favorite ones" to record for Oral Fixation, Vol. 2 and its predecessor, the Spanish-language Fijación Oral, Vol. 1. While recording the project, Shakira worked with previous collaborators, and newer partners including Jerry Duplessis and Wyclef Jean.

After the moderate success of "Don't Bother" and of the album, her label Epic Records asked Wyclef Jean, in early 2006, to remake his song "Dance Like This" with Shakira, attempting to revive sales of the album. The remake "Hips Don't Lie" premiered on KIIS-FM's Ryan Seacrest Morning Show on 14 February 2006. On 28 March 2006, the song was released as part of Oral Fixation, Vol. 2's reissue. A Spanish version of the same name was also released. Shakira also sang another version (produced by RedOne) titled "Hips Don't Lie - Bamboo" at the closing ceremony of the 2006 FIFA World Cup in Berlin, Germany. Two versions of the "Hips Don't Lie - Bamboo" remix were officially released, one in English and one in Spanish.

Shakira incorporated the rhythm of Surinamese Kawina music into Hips Don't Lie.

== Recording ==
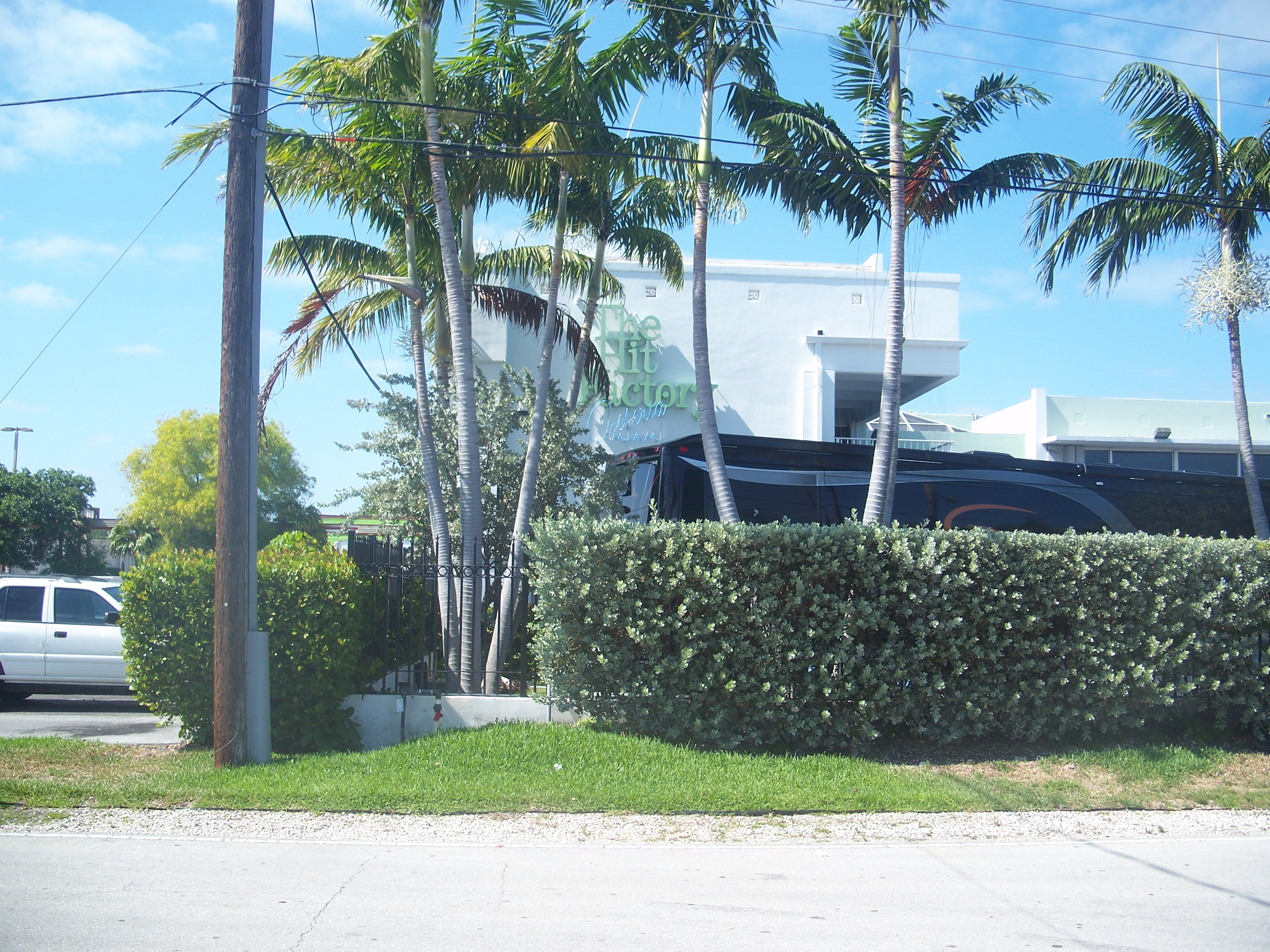
Criteria Studios (The Hit Factory Criteria Miami) was one of various studios where the song was recorded.

"Hips Don't Lie" was initially written and recorded by Wyclef Jean, Lauryn Hill and Pras for the Fugees reunion. The song was titled "Lips Don't Lie" at that point, but was never completed due to Hill's dissatisfaction with it. Charlie Walk, who at the time was the President of Epic Records, called Pras to state he wanted to do a remix of the song with Shakira. Following the call, Hill left the group and the Fugee's reunion was over. The song was then given to Shakira and along with Jean and long-time partner Jerry 'Wonder' Duplessis, they produced "Hips Don't Lie". According to another version of events, Jean was asked by Shakira's label to record a remix of "La Tortura" but refused stating he already had a record that Shakira would be perfect for. The record was Jean's own song "Dance Like This", which he recorded with Claudette Ortiz for the soundtrack of the 2004 film Dirty Dancing: Havana Nights.

Shakira co-wrote the song with Wyclef Jean, Jerry Duplessis, Omar Alfanno and LaTavia Parker, whilst production was handled by Shakira, Jean and Duplessis. Jean also served as the song's guitarist and programmer alongside Ramón Stagnaro (who also provided guitar), Hermides Benitez, Richard Bravo, Archie Pena and Roberto Cuao who all contributed the song's percussion, whilst Gustavo Celis and Jerry Duplessis added further programming. The song's recording took place at various studios including Hit Factory Criteria, Miami, FL; La Marimonda Studios, Nassau, Bahamas; Olympic Studios, London, England; Platinum Sound Recording Studio, New York, NY; Sonido Azulado, Bogota, Colombia and The Warehouse, Vancouver, British Columbia, Canada.

== Composition ==
"Hips Don't Lie"
A reworking of Wyclef Jean's 2004 song "Dance Like This", "Hips Don't Lie" is a Latin pop and reggaeton song based on samples from "Amores Como el Nuestro" written by Omar Alfanno and performed by Jerry Rivera.

"Hips Don't Lie" reimagines Wyclef Jean's 2004 song "Dance Like This" as a Latin pop song with a reggaeton beat. The song, like "Dance Like This" before it, uses a sampled salsa trumpet line from Jerry Rivera's 1992 Omar Alfanno-written song "Amores Como el Nuestro", a song previously sampled on "Deja Vu (Uptown Baby)" by Lord Tariq and Peter Gunz. The use of the opening trumpets caused a minor controversy, when Rivera openly accused Shakira of plagiarizing the opening trumpets without his knowing, unaware that rights had already been obtained from his former label Sony Discos.

According to EMI Music Publishing's digital sheet music for the song, "Hips Don't Lie" is set in common time signature, is in the key of B♭ minor, and has a moderate Latin groove of 100 beats per minute. Shakira's vocals span from the low note of A♭_{3} to the note of B♭_{4}.

During an interview, Shakira explained that the song's lyrics were inspired by her ability to determine the release-readiness of a song by whether or not it motivates her to dance. She states that she used to tell her musicians, "My hips don't lie! Are they moving? They're not moving! So this is not ready."

== Commercial performance ==
The song debuted at number 84 on the Billboard Hot 100 singles chart in the United States, based on airplay alone. For its 11th week in the chart, "Hips Don't Lie" reached number 9 based on heavy airplay rotation on American radio and received the "airplay gainer" title for three consecutive weeks. In the issue dated May 27, 2006, "Hips Don't Lie" ascended to number one on the Billboard Hot 100 Airplay chart, becoming Shakira's first number-one hit in the chart where it remained for three weeks. On the chart issue dated 17 June 2006, "Hips Don't Lie" reached number one on the multi-metric Hot 100 chart, becoming the singer's first and only number-one in the US to date. Its number-one position was aided by 267,000 digital copies sold in its first week of availability in the digital stores and its number-one position on the Hot 100 Airplay chart. That sum also marks the biggest opening-week digital sales for a single in 2006, as well as the highest-selling song in its first week for a female artist in 2006. "Hips Don't Lie" spent two consecutive weeks at the top of the chart, and was the 5th most successful song of 2006, the second highest ranked song for a female artist behind Nelly Furtado's "Promiscuous". Throughout 2006, it sold 1,410,237 digital copies in the United States. As of 17 June 2021, the song has sold 4,100,000 digital copies, two million ringtones and garnered 685 million streams in the US alone, despite only being digitally available in June 2006, three months after its release. In 2021, Billboard included the song on its list of the "Biggest Hot 100 No. 1s of Last 30 Years", confirming that the single had at least twice the weekly Hot 100 points of the runner-up title, "Ridin'" by Chamillionaire featuring Krayzie Bone during the June 17, 2006 week. To date, it is Shakira's most successful single in the United States.

In Canada, the song has been certified Diamond in 2024, being Shakira’s best selling single and one of the best selling singles in Canada.

In the UK, it spent a total of five weeks at number one. After its initial one-week reign at number one, it returned to the top in its 8th week preventing Christina Aguilera's "Ain't No Other Man", Rihanna's "Unfaithful", as well as Cascada's "Everytime We Touch" and Chamillionaire's "Ridin'" from going to No. 1 until it was replaced by Beyoncé's "Déjà Vu". "Hips Don't Lie" broke the record for the most weeks for a song in a second run, staying four weeks during its second reign at number one, a record it now shares with "Somebody That I Used to Know" by Belgian-Australian singer Gotye. The song remained in the top 10 for 16 weeks and then stayed within the top 75 for an additional 38 weeks. "Hips Don't Lie" finished the 2000s decade as the 11th best selling single by a female artist in the 21st century in the UK, and also the 10th best-selling collaboration. It is also the 46th best-selling single of the 2000s decade in the UK.

In Australia, the song debuted at No. 1 and remained at the top of the chart for 9 weeks. The song has been certified as six times platinum in the country, becoming one of the best selling 2000s singles. In Ireland, the single remained at the number one spot for a total of nine weeks throughout the summer. "Hips Don't Lie" was the most successful song of 2006 worldwide and it reached No. 1 in the majority of charting countries and territories around the world. It also reached number one on the US Billboard Pop 100 and Hot Latin Tracks charts, in Colombia, the Czech Republic, Belgium (Flanders and Wallonia), France, Germany, Greece, Hungary, Italy, Latin America, Lebanon, the Netherlands, New Zealand, and Switzerland. The song peaked inside the top ten in Austria, Canada (on the Canadian Airplay Chart), Finland, Norway, Denmark and Russia. Furthermore, it reached the 94 position on the Japan International Singles chart. In Sweden, it peaked at number forty-five. "Hips Don't Lie" was the number-two-year-end song in the Netherlands; it also finished number three in Germany and the UK, and in the US it was number five. In Germany, it is the fourth best-selling pop duet ever. It was the best selling song of 2006 in Europe.

== Music video ==
The music video was directed by British director Sophie Muller and filmed in Los Angeles. The video begins with Shakira against a black background dancing while Wyclef and a couple of other men are watching her. When Wyclef raps his first rap verse, it shows him following Shakira with pink curtains everywhere. It also shows them on the street along with different people. When the second verse begins, she is seen sitting in a chair while singing. It then cuts to an arena-like environment, where Shakira is dancing with other people. It ends with Shakira against the black background. The majority of the costumes and outfits featured in the video belong to the Carnaval de Barranquilla, some of which include the white dress Shakira dances in, and the colorful flags.

"Hips Don't Lie" proved successful on LAUNCHcast's top-hundred most-watched videos of the week, where it spent four months at number one. Yahoo! had fans submit videos of themselves dancing to the song, which were edited into a "fans only" version, which has also proved to be one of the most popular videos on LAUNCH. The video for "Hips Don't Lie" ran in the number-one spot on iTunes (along with the single) for several weeks. As of 12 June 2026, it has received over 1.825 billion views on YouTube. The video won the MTV Video Music Award for Best Choreography on 31 August 2006, and the MTV Latin Award for Song of the Year on 19 October 2006. The video also placed at number two on VH1's "Top 40 Videos of 2006". The HD music video version has been launched in Shakira's Youtube Channel in October 3, 2009.

== Live performances ==
Shakira and Wyclef Jean performed "Hips Don't Lie" at the closing ceremony preceding the 2006 FIFA World Cup final in Berlin, to worldwide TV audiences of over 700 million people. On 31 August 2006, it was performed by the duo on the 2006 MTV Video Music Awards. Shakira was given dancing lessons for the performance of the song by Indian choreographer Farah Khan. They also performed the song on the 49th Grammy Awards in 2007.

On 2 February 2020, Shakira performed the song, along with a medley of her other hits, during the Super Bowl LIV halftime show which she headlined with Jennifer Lopez. On 12 September 2023, Shakira performed a medley of her hits which includes "Hips Don't Lie" at 2023 MTV Video Music Awards, which she is the recipient of Michael Jackson Video Vanguard Award.

On 31 December 2025, Shakira performed the song for the 2026 New Year's Eve celebration in New York City, along with "This Time for Africa". Shakira has also added the song to her 2025-26 'Las Mujeres Ya No Lloran World Tour'.

== Critical reception and legacy ==
When it was released in 2006, according to Nielsen Broadcast Data Systems, "Hips Don't Lie" was the most-played pop song in a single week in American radio history. It was played 9,637 times in one week. Shakira became the first artist in the history of the Billboard charts to earn the coveted number one spots on both the Top 40 Mainstream and Latin Chart in the same week doing so with "Hips Don't Lie". Additionally, she is the only artist from South America to reach the number-one spot on the U.S. Billboard Hot 100, the Australian ARIA chart, and the UK Singles Chart. According to Billboard, "Hips Don't Lie" is one of the 23 most dominant Billboard Hot 100 number ones of the last 30 years, since it occupied the top spot with 2x the points of the weekly No. 2 song on 17 June 2006 chart. In 2006, fan-made videos directed into one became the second most streamed song on Yahoo only after Shakira's own video of it. The Los Angeles Times credits the song for starting a shock wave, and called the action the "Hips Don't Lie Impact" starting a new era of fan-artist interactions. Furthermore, the song became the most streamed video of the year reported by Nielsen Broadcast Data Systems tripling the views of the video in second place, which was Beyoncé's "Check on It".

In 2017, the song ranked 93rd on Billboard's Greatest Pop Songs of All Time list. In 2018, "Hips Don't Lie" was selected as one of the greatest songs by 21st-century women, by National Public Radio, ranking at 65. In 2021, Time Out New York picked "Hips Don't Lie" as the 11th best pop song of all time. As of 2024, "Hips Don't Lie" is the most streamed 2000s female song on Spotify.

The defunct European music channel VH1 (and its successor, MTV 00s, launched in August 2021) titled one of their regular programs as "Hits Don't Lie!".

Select rankings of "Hips Don't Lie"
Publication	List	Rank	Ref.
Billboard	Greatest Pop Songs of All Time	93	
Time Out New York	The 40 Best Pop Songs of All Time	11	
NPR	The Greatest Songs by 21st-century Women	65	

== Track listings ==
CD single:

1. "Hips Don't Lie" (featuring Wyclef Jean) [Jean, Duplessis, Shakira, Parker, Alfanno] – 3:41
2. "Dreams for Plans" [Shakira, Buckley] – 4:02
3. "Hips Don't Lie" (featuring Wyclef Jean) (Wyclef's Mixshow Mix) – 4:09

Maxi CD single:

1. "Hips Don't Lie" (featuring Wyclef Jean) – 3:41
2. "Hips Don't Lie" (Wyclef Remix) (featuring Wyclef Jean) – 3:59
3. "Hips Don't Lie" (Wyclef Mix Show Mix) (featuring Wyclef Jean) – 4:09
4. "Hips Don't Lie" (Wyclef Remix Instrumental) (featuring Wyclef Jean) – 3:57
5. "Hips Don't Lie/Bamboo" (2006 FIFA World Cup Version) – 3:24
6. "Será Será (Las Caderas No Mienten)" (Spanish version) – 3:35

2-tracks maxi single:

1. "Hips Don't Lie"
2. "Dreams for Plans"

Japanese release:

1. "Hips Don't Lie" (featuring Wyclef Jean) – 3:41
2. "Hips Don't Lie/Bamboo" (2006 FIFA World Cup Mix) (featuring Wyclef Jean)
3. "Será Será (Las Caderas No Mienten)" (Spanish version) (featuring Wyclef Jean) – 3:41
4. "Hips Don't Lie" (DJ Kazzanova Remix) (featuring Wyclef Jean)

Ringle:

1. "Hips Don't Lie" (featuring Wyclef Jean) – 3:41
2. "Hips Don't Lie" (featuring Wyclef Jean) (Wyclef's Show Mix) – 4:09
3. "Será Será (Las Caderas No Mienten)" (Spanish Version) (featuring Wyclef Jean) – 3:41

== Awards and nominations ==
"Hips Don't Lie" was a critical success and was nominated for various awards; the American Society of Composers, Authors and Publishers (ASCAP) awarded the song the accolades of Ascap Latin Award – Pop/Ballad Winning Song and Ascap Pop Music Award – Most Performed Songs. At the Billboard Music Awards the song was nominated for three awards; Pop Single of the Year, Top Hot 100 Single and Top Pop 100 Airplay Track. In 2007, the song won at the Best Latin/Reggaeton Track at the International Dance Music Awards.

Year	Nominee / work	Award	Result
2006	Billboard Music Awards	Pop Single of the Year	Nominated
2006	Billboard Music Awards	Top Pop 100 Airplay Track	Nominated
2006	Billboard Music Awards	Top Hot 100 Single	Nominated
2006	BMI Awards	BMI Urban Award – Billboard No. 1s	Won
2006	Echo Awards	Best International Single	Nominated
2006	Grammy Awards	Best Pop Collaboration with Vocals	Nominated
2006	Los Premios MTV Latinoamérica	Song of the Year	Won
2006	Latin Billboard Music Awards	Hot Latin Song of the Year-Vocal Duet or Collaboration	Won
2006	Latin Billboard Music Awards	Latin Pop Airplay Song of the Year – Duo or Group	Nominated
2006	Latin Billboard Music Awards	Hot Latin Songs of the Year	Nominated
2006	MTV Europe Music Awards	Best Song	Nominated
2006	MTV Video Music Awards	Best Female Video	Nominated
2006	MTV Video Music Awards	Best Pop Video	Nominated
2006	MTV Video Music Awards	Best Dance Video	Nominated
2006	MTV Video Music Awards	Video of the Year	Nominated
2006	MTV Video Music Awards	Viewer's Choice Awards	Nominated
2006	MTV Video Music Awards	Best Choreography in a Video	Won
2006	MTV Video Music Awards	Best Art Direction in a Video	Nominated
2007	International Dance Music Awards	Best Latin/Reggaeton Track	Won

== Charts ==
=== Weekly charts ===
Chart (2006–2007)	Peak position
Argentina (Associated Press)	1
Australia (ARIA)	1
Austria (Ö3 Austria Top 40)	2
Belgium (Ultratop 50 Flanders)	1
Belgium (Ultratop 50 Wallonia)	1
Brazil (Crowley Broadcast Analysis)	8
Canada Hot 100 (Billboard)	31
Canada Digital Song Sales (Billboard)	1
Canada AC (Billboard)	28
Canada CHR/Pop Top 40 (Radio & Records)	1
Canada CHR/Top 40 (Billboard)	2
Canada Hot AC (Radio & Records)	9
Canada Hot AC (Billboard)	10
CIS Airplay (TopHit)	2
Croatia International Airplay (Top lista)	1
Czech Republic Airplay (ČNS IFPI)	1
Denmark (Tracklisten)	4
European Hot 100 Singles (Billboard)	3
Finland (Suomen virallinen lista)	2
France (SNEP)	1
Germany (GfK)	1
Global Dance Songs (Billboard)	2
Greece (IFPI)	4
Hungary (Dance Top 40)	2
Hungary (Rádiós Top 40)	1
Hungary (Single Top 40)	2
Ireland (IRMA)	1
Italy (FIMI)	1
Japan (Oricon)	94
Latvia (Latvian Airplay Top 50)	3
Netherlands (Dutch Top 40)	1
Netherlands (Single Top 100)	1
New Zealand (Recorded Music NZ)	1
Norway (VG-lista)	2
Paraguay (Associated Press)	4
Poland (Polish Airplay Charts)	2
Russia Airplay (TopHit)	1
Scottish Singles Sales (Official Charts)	1
Slovakia Airplay (ČNS IFPI)	8
Sweden (Sverigetopplistan)	45
Switzerland (Schweizer Hitparade)	1
UK Singles (Official Charts)	1
UK Hip Hop/R&B (Official Charts)	1
Ukraine Airplay (TopHit)	39
Uruguay (Associated Press)	3
US Billboard Hot 100	1
US Adult Contemporary (Billboard)	24
US Adult Pop Airplay (Billboard)	18
US Dance Airplay (Billboard)	10
US Hot Latin Songs (Billboard)	1
US Pop Airplay (Billboard)	1
US Rhythmic Airplay (Billboard)	5
Venezuela Pop Rock (Record Report)	1

Chart (2011)	Peak position
US Latin Digital Songs (Billboard)	1

Chart (2013)	Peak position
UK Singles (Official Charts)	77
US Latin Streaming Songs (Billboard)	1

Chart (2014)	Peak position
Canada Digital Song Sales (Billboard)	36

Chart (2020)	Peak position
Canada Digital Song Sales (Billboard)	20
US Rolling Stone Top 100	79
US Digital Songs Sales (Billboard)	12

Chart (2023)	Peak position
Global 200 (Billboard)	193
Portugal (AFP)	186
Spain (PROMUSICAE)	93

Chart (2024)	Peak position
France (SNEP)	174
Global 200 (Billboard)	134
Greece International (IFPI)	68
Switzerland (Schweizer Hitparade)	79

Chart (2025–2026)	Peak position
Brazil Hot 100 (Billboard)	86
Germany (GfK)	28
Global 200 (Billboard)	57
Greece International (IFPI)	25
Netherlands (Single Top 100)	94
Norway (IFPI Norge)	40
Portugal (AFP)	110
Slovakia Singles Digital (ČNS IFPI)	23
Sweden (Sverigetopplistan)	26
United Arab Emirates (IFPI)	20

Weekly chart performance for "Hips Don't Lie" (Spotify Anniversary version featuring Beéle and Ed Sheeran)
Chart (2025—2026)	Peak position
Argentina Hot 100 (Billboard)	73
Argentina Airplay (Monitor Latino)	6
Central America Anglo Airplay (Monitor Latino)	12
Central America + Caribbean (BMAT)	8
Chile Airplay (Monitor Latino)	12
Colombia (Colombia Hot 100)	21
Costa Rica Airplay (FONOTICA)	15
Costa Rica Airplay (Monitor Latino)	12
Ecuador Anglo Airplay (Monitor Latino)	7
El Salvador Airplay (ASAP EGC)	1
France (SNEP)	98
Guatemala Airplay (Monitor Latino)	7
Honduras Anglo Airplay (Monitor Latino)	7
Latin America Anglo Airplay (Monitor Latino)	3
Latin America Latino Airplay (Monitor Latino)	2
Lithuania (AGATA)	84
Panama Airplay (Monitor Latino)	11
Panama International (PRODUCE)	33
Paraguay Anglo Airplay (Monitor Latino)	12
Peru Airplay (Monitor Latino)	7
Puerto Rico Airplay (Monitor Latino)	3
Venezuela Airplay (Record Report)	9

=== Year-end charts ===
Chart (2006)	Position
Australia (ARIA)	3
Austria (Ö3 Austria Top 40)	3
Belgium (Ultratop 50 Flanders)	5
Belgium (Ultratop 50 Wallonia)	1
Brazil (Crowley)	7
CIS (TopHit)	7
European Hot 100 Singles (Billboard)	1
France (SNEP)	13
Germany (Media Control GfK)	3
Hungary (Dance Top 40)	6
Hungary (Rádiós Top 40)	9
Italy (FIMI)	2
Ireland (IRMA)	2
Netherlands (Dutch Top 40)	3
Netherlands (Single Top 100)	3
New Zealand (RIANZ)	4
Russia Airplay (TopHit)	6
Switzerland (Schweizer Hitparade)	1
UK Singles (OCC)	3
US Billboard Hot 100	5
US Hot Latin Songs (Billboard)	1
US Latin Pop Airplay (Billboard)	3
US Rhythmic Airplay (Billboard)	32

Chart (2007)	Position
Brazil (Crowley)	25

Chart (2013)	Position
US Latin Digital Songs (Billboard)	2

Chart (2014)	Position
US Latin Digital Songs (Billboard)	4

Chart (2015)	Position
US Latin Digital Songs (Billboard)	8

Chart (2016)	Position
US Latin Digital Songs (Billboard)	8

Chart (2017)	Position
US Latin Digital Songs (Billboard)	27

Chart (2024)	Position
Germany (TopHit)	199

=== Decade-end charts ===
Chart (2000–2009)	Position
Austria (Ö3 Austria Top 40)	25
CIS Airplay (TopHit)	114
Germany (Official German Charts)	30
Netherlands (Single Top 100)	43
Russia Airplay (TopHit)	94

=== All-time charts ===
Chart	Position
US Mainstream Top 40 (Billboard)	93

== Certifications and sales ==
Region	Certification	Certified units/sales
Australia (ARIA)	6× Platinum	420,000^{‡}
Austria (IFPI Austria)	Gold	15,000^{*}
Belgium (BRMA)	Platinum	50,000^{*}
Brazil (Pro-Música Brasil)	2× Platinum	120,000^{‡}
Canada (Music Canada)	Diamond	800,000^{‡}
Canada (Music Canada) Ringtone	Platinum	40,000
Colombia	Diamond+3× Platinum+6× Gold	
Denmark (IFPI Danmark)	3× Platinum	270,000^{‡}
France (SNEP)	Gold	200,000^{*}
Germany (BVMI)	3× Platinum	900,000^{‡}
Italy	—	22,000
Italy (FIMI) since 2009	2× Platinum	200,000^{‡}
Mexico (AMPROFON)	2× Diamond+Gold	630,000^{‡}
Mexico (AMPROFON) Ringtone; Bamboo version	2× Platinum	50,000^{*}
Mexico (AMPROFON) Ringtone; Clean version	Platinum+Gold	35,000^{*}
Mexico (AMPROFON) Ringtone; English version	2× Platinum	50,000^{*}
Mexico (AMPROFON) Ringtone; Spanish version	Platinum	25,000^{*}
New Zealand (RMNZ)	5× Platinum	150,000^{‡}
Portugal (AFP)	3× Platinum	30,000^{‡}
Spain (Promusicae)	3× Platinum	180,000^{‡}
Switzerland (IFPI Switzerland)	Platinum	30,000^{^}
United Kingdom (BPI)	5× Platinum	3,000,000^{‡}
United States (RIAA) Digital downloads only	2× Platinum	4,100,000
United States (RIAA) Mastertone	2× Platinum	2,000,000^{*}
Streaming
Greece (IFPI Greece)	3× Platinum	6,000,000^{†}
Summaries
Worldwide (downloads)	—	13,000,000
^{*} Sales figures based on certification alone.^{^} Shipments figures based on certification alone.^{‡} Sales+streaming figures based on certification alone.^{†} Streaming-only figures based on certification alone.

== Release history ==
Release dates and formats for "Hips Don't Lie"
Region	Date	Format(s)	Label(s)	Ref.
United States	28 February 2006	Contemporary hit radio; rhythmic contemporary radio	Epic	
Germany	27 March 2006	CD	Sony BMG	
Russia	3 April 2006	Contemporary hit radio	Sony BMG	
France	2 May 2006	CD	Sony BMG	
Germany	5 May 2006	Maxi CD	Sony BMG	
Australia	12 June 2006	CD	Sony BMG	
United Kingdom	12 June 2006	CD	RCA UK	
Japan	14 June 2006	Maxi CD	Sony BMG	
United States	5 September 2006	12-inch vinyl	Epic	
United States	23 October 2007	CD (ringle)	Epic	

== See also ==
- List of Romanian Top 100 number ones of the 2000s
- List of best-selling singles in Canada
- List of best-selling singles in Germany
- List of best-selling singles in Spain
- List of million-selling singles in the United Kingdom
- List of best-selling singles of the 2000s (decade) in the United Kingdom
- List of best-selling Latin singles
