= La Tortura =

2005 single by Shakira feat. Alejandro Sanz

Single by Shakira featuring Alejandro Sanz

from the album Fijación Oral, Vol. 1
- Language: Spanish
- English title: "The Torture"
- Released: 11 April 2005
- Studio: Compass Point Studios (Nassau, Bahamas)
- Genre: Pop; reggaeton; dancehall
- Length: 3:34
- Label: Epic
- Composers: Shakira; Luis Fernando Ochoa
- Lyricist: Shakira
- Producer: Shakira

Shakira singles chronology
"Poem to a Horse" (2004)	"La Tortura" (2005)	"No" (2005)

Alejandro Sanz singles chronology
"Tú No Tienes Alma" (2004)	"La Tortura" (2005)	"A la Primera Persona" (2006)

Music videos
- "La Tortura" on YouTube; "La Tortura" (Shaketon remix) on YouTube

"La Tortura" (English: "Torture") is a song by Colombian singer-songwriter Shakira, featuring Spanish singer Alejandro Sanz, from Shakira's sixth studio album, Fijación Oral, Vol. 1 (2005). The song was produced by Shakira and co-written by the singer with Luis Fernando Ochoa. Lester Mendez served as an assistant producer. Epic Records released the song on 11 April 2005 by as the lead single from the album. "La Tortura" is a pop, reggaeton, and dancehall track, which lyrically tells the story of a woman who has been emotionally "tortured" because her boyfriend cheated and eventually left her for another, and has now returned begging forgiveness.

Upon its release, "La Tortura" received generally positive reviews by music critics, who agreed that the song was a highlight from Fijación Oral, Vol. 1; they were also ambivalent towards its "Shaketon Mix". It was well received commercially, reaching number one in several countries worldwide, including Hungary, Spain and Venezuela. In the United States, the single reached number 23 on the Billboard Hot 100 (giving Sanz his only entry on said chart), while topping the Hot Latin Songs chart for 25 non-consecutive weeks. It was eventually certified gold by the Recording Industry Association of America (RIAA) for a million digital copies sold in the region. "La Tortura" received multiple awards and nominations, including the Latin Grammy Award for Record of the Year and Song of the Year at the 7th Annual Latin Grammy Awards.

The music video for "La Tortura" was directed by Michael Haussman and became one of the first Spanish music videos to be aired on MTV. It depicts Sanz spying on Shakira in her apartment, as they remember the times when they were a couple; Shakira also appears dancing erotically on a building's roof, covered with black greasepaint. To promote the single, she performed it on several televised shows and events, and included it in the setlist for three of her concert tours, with the most recent being the Las Mujeres Ya No Lloran World Tour (2025). The song was covered by Puerto Rican singer Gilberto Santa Rosa and has been credited with being one of the songs to popularize reggaetón globally, outside of the Hispanophone diaspora.

== Background and development ==
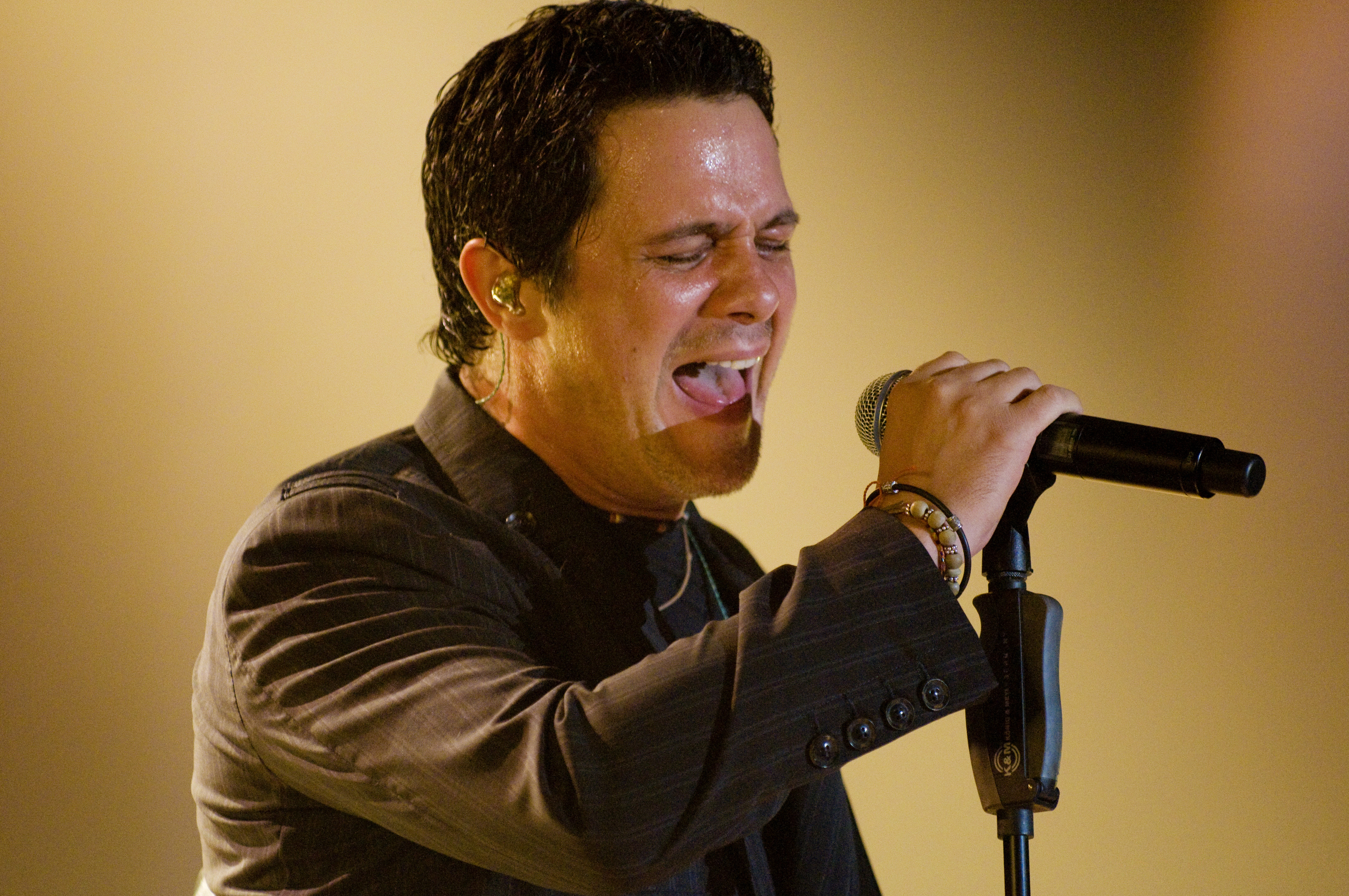
Spanish singer Alejandro Sanz (pictured) was the featured artist on "La Tortura".

After achieving crossover success in 2001 with her first English-language album, Laundry Service, Shakira started working on its follow-up. Having co-written almost 60 songs for the project, in both Spanish and English, Shakira decided to divide the release into two volumes, opting to first release an album entirely in Spanish, titled Fijación Oral, Vol. 1. This would be her first all-Spanish record since Dónde Están los Ladrones? (1998). For the album, Shakira worked with previous collaborators along with new partners, such as Argentine musician Gustavo Cerati and Spanish singer Alejandro Sanz. She stated that "they are very credible artists within Hispanic music, great composers and unique voices". Billboard opined that their presence on the album could help Shakira re-enter the Latin music market, as her last Spanish album was released seven years prior.

During the 2004 holiday season, Shakira and Sanz worked together in his home studio in Miami. She recalls being nervous as it was the first time she got together with another artist to produce one of her songs. Sanz, who records himself and is the engineer of his own songs, spent three nights in a row going to bed at five in the morning to create the perfect sound for the track. She recalled: "I remember I told him, 'Can't you change this little note?' And he just said to me, 'what?'. He almost threw a puck at my head", referring to her perfectionism. Shakira stated that she spent a full month tweaking the track, as she thought that it was "a song that needed clearly the right, the accurate production. If I went a little bit left or little bit far right, the song would suffer and get affected. And I struggled with the song until I finally got it." Through a statement published by Shakira's label, Epic Records, she considered Sanz's voice as the one the song needed, as it is "raw, unique, full of sensuality"; Sanz described Shakira as "obsessive about detail", and elaborated that she was "a little girl but a giant woman who lives madly in love with her dreams". "La Tortura", the result of their sessions together in the studio, was released as the lead single from Fijación Oral, Vol. 1 in the United States on 11 April 2005, by Epic Records. An electronic-flavored remix, titled the "Shaketon Mix", was later added to the album.

== Composition ==
"La Tortura"
A 22-second sample of "La Tortura", depicting its pop, reggaeton and dancehall influences.

"La Tortura" was written by Shakira and Luis Fernando Ochoa, while produced by the former and Lester Mendez, who also played keyboards on the song. Sanz also played the Tres Cubano, with Lyle Workman playing the guitar, and Rene Toledo the acoustic guitar. Other instrumentation for "La Tortura" included bass by Paul Bushnell, accordion by Umberto Judex and Frank Marocco, and percussion by Archie Peña. The mixing and engineering for "La Tortura" was performed by Gustavo Celis at Supersonic Studios in Miami, with additional engineering by Rob Jacobs and Kevin Killen. Vlado Meller completed the audio mastering at Sony Music Studios in New York City.

Musically, "La Tortura" is a pop, reggaetón and dancehall song, with some reviewers noting elements of flamenco, cumbia, and electronica in its composition. The New York Times' Jon Pareles observed the rock guitars and electronic blips present on the track, as well as an accordion and Sanz's "spry tres guitar", which provided a "funky cumbia feel". According to Shakira, "La Tortura" is a mix of many different elements, explaining that, within its composition, there would be "a little bit of acoustic guitars, a little bit of accordions. It's probably my most Latin track, too. It's one of those cocktails I like to put together". The song is set in common time with a moderate tempo of 62 beats per minute. It is composed in the key of C major with Shakira and Sanz's vocal ranges spanning from E^{3} to A^{5}.

According to Shakira, "La Tortura" lyrically deals with "love and hate, infidelity, doubts, a chance of being forgiven... it's a song a [I] wrote in order to reflect that Latin reality called machismo, which is both tragic and comic at the same time". The track is about the "torture" it has been for two lovers to leave each other. One continually betrays the other, who is tired of the lies. Sanz sings, "I know I have not been a saint/but I can fix it baby", (Note: In the original: "Yo sé que no he sido un santo/pero lo puedo arreglar amor".) while Shakira responds: "you better keep that bone to another dog and then we say goodbye". (Note: In the original: "Mejor te guardas todo eso a otro perro con ese hueso y nos decimos adiós".) The song ends as Shakira decides to leave Sanz, despite his pleas, but she asserts that she will not cry over him.

== Critical response ==
Upon release, "La Tortura" received generally positive reviews from music critics. Matt Cibula from PopMatters wrote that "what really matters are these two overheated voices working with and against each other, and the way that undeniable beat really comes alive when there is actually a beautiful melody underneath it". Described as a "beat-heavy scorcher" by Geoff Harkness from Chicago Tribune, it was seen by the journalist as the best track on the album Fijación Oral, Vol. 1, who saw its choice as the lead single as a "no-brainer". The staff of Houston Chronicle agreed, naming the track an "obvious standout", and complimenting Sanz's vocals, as his "raspy delivery gives the song a razor-sharp edge". Spence D. from IGN opined that the "ethnic" musical implements on "La Tortura", such as accordion, Spanish guitar flutters, jostling rhythms, and Sanz's vocals "make for one of the more enjoyable and distinct inclusions on the album; a slice of Shakira being Shakira and eschewing the affectation of anybody else's vocal stylings".

For Los Angeles Times' Agustin Gurza, "La Tortura" was "so deliciously pop you forgive the crass calculation of mixing restrained reggaeton beats (narcissistically called 'Shaketon'), a dash of Gipsy Kings, a touch of Colombian accordion. Radio loves it and the clubs will too". Ruan Carlo from Sputnikmusic deemed the track as "the most commercial song in the album", noting that it was "noticeably different from previous singles", as it sounds "very Latin, and yet synthesizers are heard at one point", which gives the song a "global tone". Jon Pareles of The New York Times complimented the song and its "Shaketon Mix", arguing that "one of it sounds forced: for Shakira it's all pop, taut structures for volatile passion". Jorge Patiño of Rolling Stone Argentina described the remix as "a cleaner work than the original version until the percussion enters and falls into the reggaeton that invades the stations". Tom Townsend from Yahoo! Music opined that the original song was "slightly disappointing" but was "greatly improved by the remix, tacked on as a bonus track" on the album. Mariana Enriquez from Página/12 called it "not a great song, but at this point no one can avoid humming it".

=== Accolades ===
Year	Award ceremony	Category	Result	Ref.
2005	Billboard Music Awards	Latin Song of the Year	Won	
2005	Premios Juventud	La Pareja Más Pareja (Dynamic Duet)	Won	
2005	Premios Juventud	La Más Pegajosa (Catchiest Tune)	Nominated	
2005	MTV Video Music Awards Latin America	Video of the Year	Won	
2006	Latin Billboard Music Awards	Hot Latin Song of the Year	Won	
2006	Latin Billboard Music Awards	Vocal Duet Hot Latin Song of the Year	Won	
2006	Latin Billboard Music Awards	Duo or Group Latin Pop Airplay Song of the Year	Won	
2006	Latin Billboard Music Awards	Latin Ringtone of the Year	Won	
2006	Latin Grammy Awards	Record of the Year	Won	
2006	Latin Grammy Awards	Song of the Year	Won	
2006	Lo Nuestro Awards	Pop Song of the Year	Won	
2006	International Dance Music Awards	Best Latin Dance Track	Won	
2007	BMI Latin Awards	Song of the Year	Won	
2007	BMI Latin Awards	Latin Ringtone of the Year	Won	

== Commercial performance ==
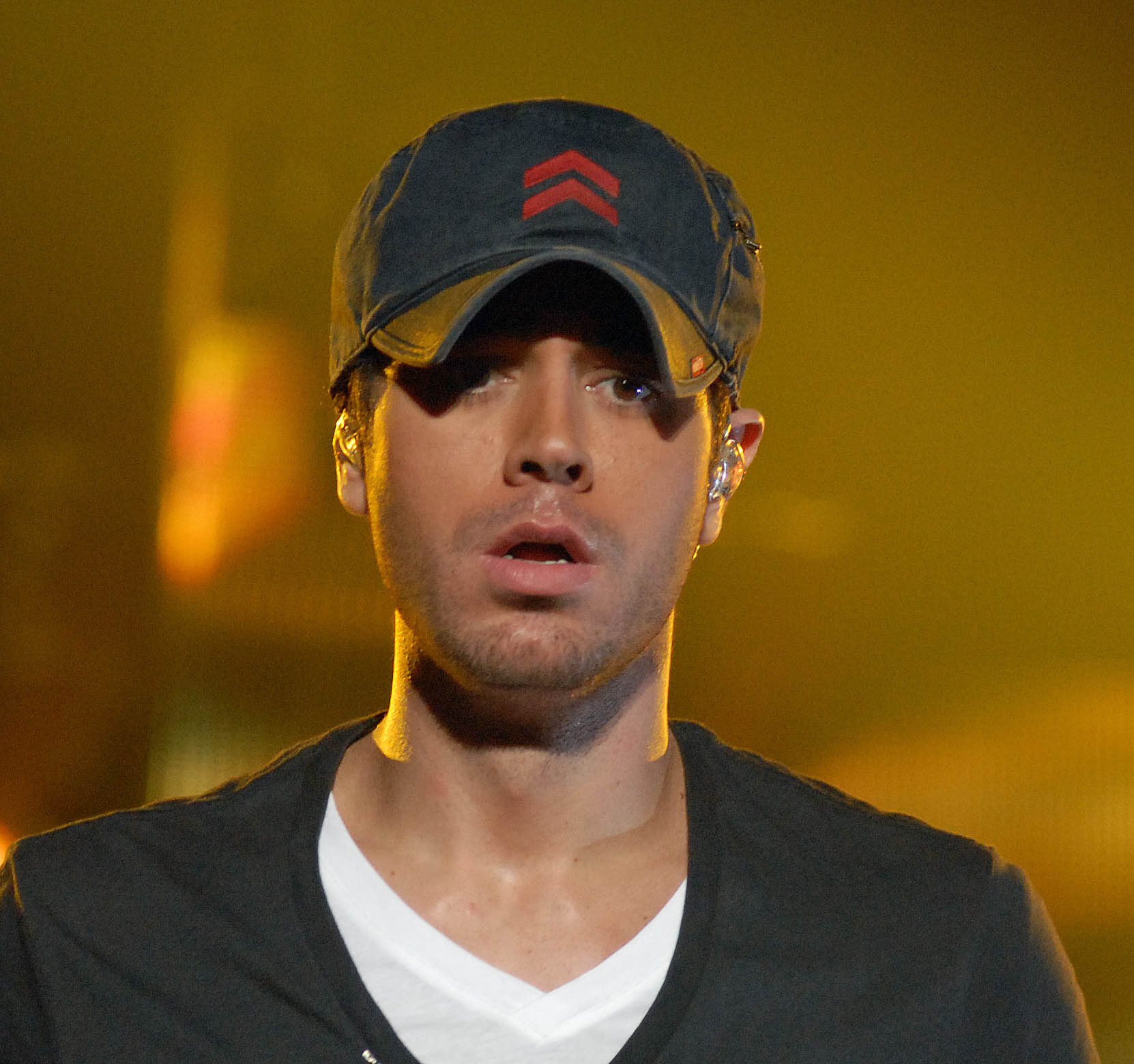
"La Tortura" the longest-leading song at the top of the US Hot Latin Songs chart until Enrique Iglesias' (pictured) "Bailando".

In total, "La Tortura" has sold around five million copies worldwide. In Latin America, the single was well received commercially. In Colombia, Shakira's home country, it peaked at number three. The song also reached number three in Panama, while reaching the top of the charts in Guatemala and Venezuela.

In the United States, "La Tortura" debuted at number 98 on the Billboard Hot 100, on the issue dated 7 May 2005. The track slowly climbed the chart until it reached its peak of number 23, on 24 September 2005. On the Hot Latin Songs chart, the song debuted at number 11 on the week of 30 April 2005. It later reached the summit five weeks later, replacing "La Camisa Negra" by Juanes. The single spent a total of 25 non-consecutive weeks at the top, becoming the longest-leading song at number one which was previously held by Son by Four's "A Puro Dolor" (2000), with 20 weeks. The record was later broken by "Bailando" (2014) by Enrique Iglesias featuring Descemer Bueno and Gente de Zona, with 41 weeks. "La Tortura" ended 2005 as the best-performing Latin single of the year. Due to its success, the song was certified platinum by Recording Industry Association of America (RIAA) for over 1,000,000 digital sales. In the Latin field, it received a diamond certification due to sales of 1.92 million sales.

"La Tortura" was also successful in Europe. In Austria, the track reached number three, being later certified gold by IFPI Austria. In Denmark, the song reached number seven on the singles chart, and was also certified gold by IFPI Denmark. In Germany, it peaked at number four, and was certified gold by the Bundesverband Musikindustrie (BVMI). In Switzerland, it reached a peak of number two, staying there for nine non-consecutive weeks. The single was eventually certified gold by the IFPI Switzerland. In other parts of Europe, "La Tortura" reached the top three in several countries, such as Croatia, Italy, and Switzerland, while peaking inside the top ten in France, Greece, Lebanon and Sweden. (Note: See #Charts) It eventually topped the charts in Hungary, Romania, as well as Spain, Sanz's home country. The song's commercial performance in the European countries helped it attain a peak of number five on the European Hot 100 Singles chart, on the issue dated 6 August 2005.

== Music video ==
Shakira and Sanz portraying a couple in the music video for "La Tortura".

The music video for "La Tortura" was directed by Michael Haussman. Shakira declared that she really liked his work, as she felt he was "a very sensitive man". She also stated that Haussman "was the right person to convey the feeling of this video, to understand it, and besides all that, he has a very good energy, a great vibe, he has a nice spirit and good humor. Working with him was a beautiful experience". It was filmed on 8–12 April 2005 in Bay Harbor Island, in an art deco building. Before filming the video, she consulted a priest friend about whether it would be proper to film the scenes as Sanz's love interest while in a committed relationship with her then-fiancé, Antonio de la Rúa, and the priest gave her permission. Shakira did her own make-up for the video, as she wanted a "very natural look" for it. The choreography was made by Jamie King and Shakira herself; according to her, she made up all the moves while King filmed her with a camera, and then had to learn her own moves, calling the process "so hard". The choreography has been described as ultra-sensual.

The music video was premiered on 26 April 2005 through MTV's Making the Video series. Following a special airing of Daddy Yankee's "Gasolina" video on MTV in 2004, "La Tortura" was among the first Spanish music videos to air on MTV. It also became the first Spanish video to be added to high rotation on VH1. Additionally, the whole episode of Making the Video was aired in Spanish, with English subtitles. The music video begins with Sanz observing Shakira in an apartment as she is walking down the street on her way to her own apartment, which is located on the other side of the street, while holding a bag of onions. He watches her crying while cutting them, but the onions are out of his view. Scenes from the time they were still a couple are shown, with the pair seen eating Chinese food, and Shakira crawling across the table as Sanz admires her. She is then seen dancing erotically on a building's roof, covered in black greasepaint. The video ends with Shakira coming to the window to realize Sanz was spying on her and turns back.

The video for the song's remix version, known as "La Tortura (Shaketon Remix)", featuring some previously unseen scenes, was included on the Oral Fixation, Vol. 1 & 2 (2006) bonus DVD. The music video won the prize for Video of the Year at the 2005 MTV Video Music Awards Latinoamérica. It also received three nominations at the 2005 MTV Video Music Awards, in the categories Best Female Video, Best Dance Video and Viewer's Choice Award, becoming the first time a Spanish music video was up for a nomination at the awards. The next year, "La Tortura" was nominated for Best Short Form Music Video at the 7th Annual Latin Grammy Awards. The video was marked "Vevo Certified" by joint venture music video website Vevo for reaching more than 100 million views.

== Live performances ==
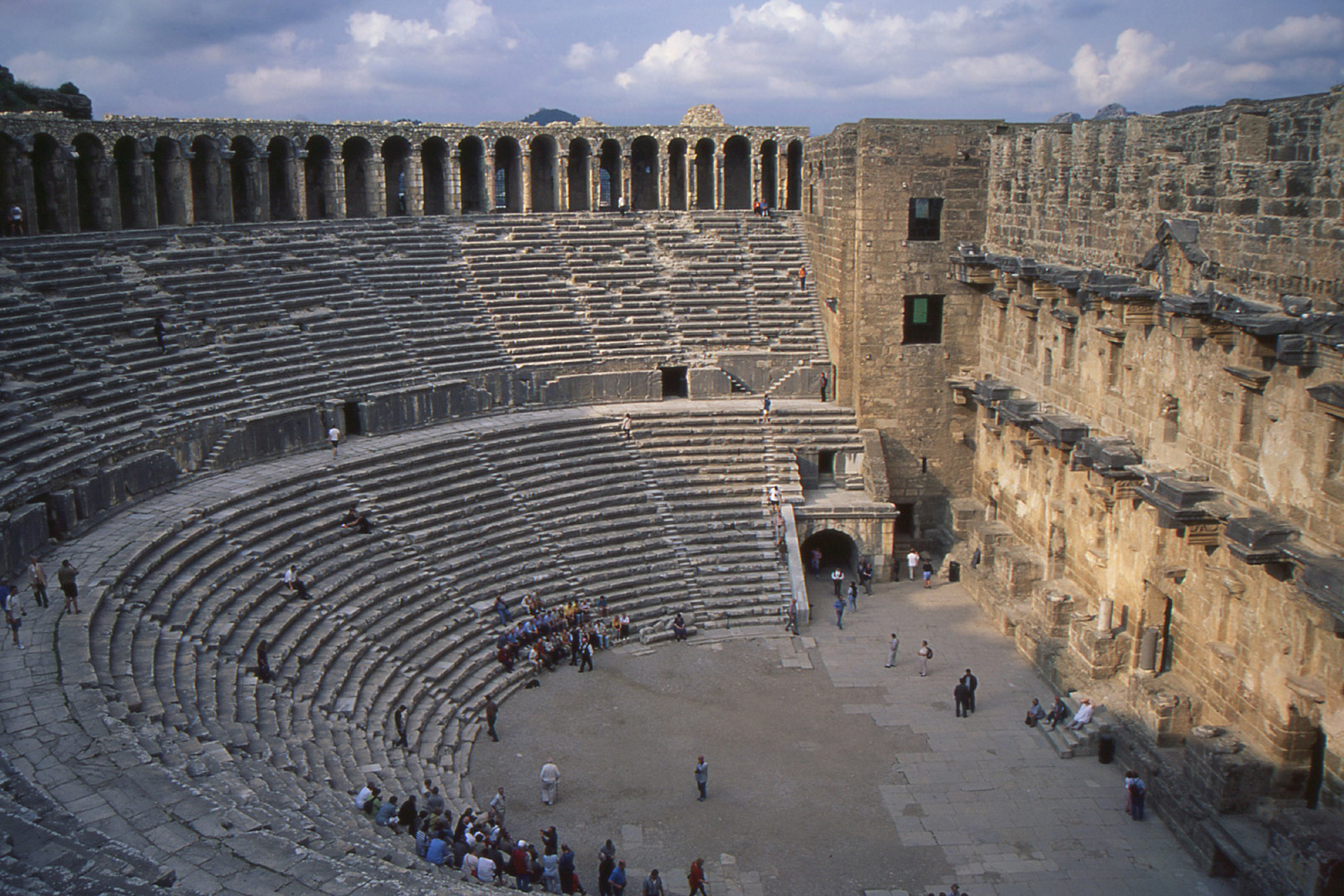
Shakira first performed the song in the ancient Roman amphitheater of Aspendos (pictured) for German television show Wetten, dass..?.

The first live performance Shakira gave for "La Tortura" was on the German television show Wetten, dass..?, filmed in the ancient Roman amphitheater of Aspendos, near Antalaya, Turkey, and aired on 15 May 2005. She then went to the United States and gave performances for the track on MTV's Total Request Live, on 31 May and on Good Morning America, three days later. Shakira and Sanz sang the song together for the first time at Madrid bid for the 2012 Summer Olympics on 5 June 2005. A few days later, on 20 June, she performed the single during UNICEF's 50th anniversary in the Netherlands. Shakira was also part of the MTV Day festival in Madrid, Spain which took place on 29 June 2005, performing "La Tortura" and "No", another song from Fijación Oral Vol. 1, among other songs from her back catalog. On 2 July, she appeared at Palace of Versailles in Paris to sing "La Tortura" and "Whenever, Wherever" as part of the Live 8 benefit concert. Days later, she went to Argentina and gave a performance of "La Tortura" on her own television special titled Shakira: Íntimo, aired by Telefe.

Shakira and Sanz performed "La Tortura" together on the 2005 MTV Video Music Awards on 28 August 2005. It was the first time in the history of the awards show that a song was performed completely in another language other than English. On 8 September, she performed it on Fashion Rocks event, which took place at Radio City Music Hall and aired a day later by CBS. In November, Shakira gave a surprise concert at Times Square for Yahoo! Launch, and gave a performance of "La Tortura" along with "Don't Bother" and "Hey You", songs from Oral Fixation Vol. 2. The same month, she also traveled to the Netherlands and sang the song at the UNESCO Gala event on 12 November. On 10 December 2005, she performed the song with Sanz on season 31 of Saturday Night Live. Shakira included "La Tortura" on her setlist for the KIIS-FM's Jingle Ball at Shrine Auditorium in Los Angeles. Ten days later, she also performed the song during her set on Z100's Jingle Ball at Madison Square Garden in New York City. Shakira performed a set of songs on US television program Today, including "La Tortura", on 28 April 2006.

Shakira included the song in the setlist for her concert at the Rock in Rio festival in Lisbon, on 26 May 2006. The song was later performed during her 2006–07 Oral Fixation Tour, which was launched to promote the albums Fijación Oral, Vol. 1 and Oral Fixation, Vol. 2. The performance of the song during the concert in Miami, Florida, on 9 December 2006, featured Sanz, and was filmed for a live album release. On 2 November 2006, the pair sang the track at the 7th Annual Latin Grammy Awards, where she took four awards. "La Tortura" was performed by Shakira during her set on the Plymouth Jazz Festival in Trinidad and Tobago, on 26 April 2008. In May 2008, she was part of the ALAS Foundation's concert in Buenos Aires, also performing the song. She also included "La Tortura" on the setlist for her concert at Rock in Rio held at Madrid, on 4 July. It was also included on her sets of the Rock in Rio Lisboa and Madrid festivals on 21 May and 5 June 2010, respectively. Shakira also performed the song as part of her 2010–11 The Sun Comes Out World Tour. Years later, the track was performed again on the 2018 El Dorado World Tour. In 2019, Shakira was a surprise guest at Sanz's La Gira tour stop in Barcelona, and sang the song with him. In 2025, Shakira performed the song on Las Mujeres Ya No Lloran World Tour.

== Cover and impact ==
In 2011, Puerto Rican singer Gilberto Santa Rosa performed a live cover of "La Tortura" as part the Latin Recording Academy tribute to Shakira where she was honored Person of the Year. In 2009, a book named Reggaeton credited the song for popularizing the genre in regions such as North America, Europe, and Asia.

== Track listings ==
- European CD maxi-single
1. "La Tortura" (Album Version) – 3:32
2. "La Tortura" (Shaketon Remix) – 3:12
3. "La Pared" (Acoustic Version) – 2:39
- European CD single
1. "La Tortura" (Album Version) – 3:32
2. "La Tortura" (Shaketon Remix) – 3:12

== Credits and personnel ==
Credits adapted from the liner notes of Fijación Oral, Vol. 1.

- Shakira – lead vocals, songwriter, producer
- Alejandro Sanz – featured artist, tres cubano
- Luis Fernando Ochoa – songwriter
- Lester Mendez – producer, keyboards
- Lyle Workman – guitars
- Rene Toledo – acoustic guitar
- Paul Bushnell – drums
- Umberto Judex – accordion
- Frank Marocco – accordion
- Archie Peña – percussion
- Pete Davis – programming
- Jose "Gocho" Torres – programming
- Gian Arias – programming
- Juan Santana – programming
- Rob Jacobs – audio engineer
- Kevin Killen – audio engineer
- Gustavo Celis – mixing
- Vlado Meller – mastering

== Charts ==
=== Weekly charts ===
2005 weekly chart performance for "La Tortura"
Chart (2005)	Peak position
Austria (Ö3 Austria Top 40)	3
Belgium (Ultratop 50 Flanders)	8
Belgium (Ultratop 50 Wallonia)	5
CIS Airplay (TopHit)	2
Colombia (Notimex)	3
Croatia (HRT)	2
Czech Republic (IFPI)	9
Denmark (Tracklisten)	7
Europe (Eurochart Hot 100)	5
Finland (Suomen virallinen lista)	6
France (SNEP)	7
Germany (GfK)	4
Greece (IFPI)	4
Guatemala (Notimex)	1
Hungary (Rádiós Top 40)	1
Hungary (Single Top 40)	3
Hungary (Dance Top 40)	5
Italy (FIMI)	3
Netherlands (Dutch Top 40)	3
Netherlands (Single Top 100)	2
Norway (VG-lista)	11
Panama (Notimex)	3
Romania (Romanian Top 100)	1
Russia Airplay (TopHit)	6
Spain (Promusicae)	1
Sweden (Sverigetopplistan)	6
Switzerland (Schweizer Hitparade)	2
Ukraine Airplay (TopHit)	22
US Billboard Hot 100	23
US Hot Latin Songs (Billboard)	1
US Latin Pop Airplay (Billboard)	1
US Latin Urban (Radio & Records)	5
US Spanish Contemporary (Radio & Records)	1
US Tropical (Radio & Records)	1
Venezuela (Record Report)	1

2014–2020 weekly chart performance for "La Tortura"
Chart (2014–2020)	Peak position
Czech Republic Singles Digital (ČNS IFPI)	78
Ukraine (TopHit)	197
Ukraine Airplay (TopHit)	121
US Latin Digital Songs (Billboard)	7

2025 weekly chart performance for "La Tortura"
Chart (2025)	Peak position
Ecuador (Billboard)	24

2026 weekly chart performance for "La Tortura"
Chart (2026)	Peak position
Spain (Promusicae)	74

=== Year-end charts ===
2005 year-end chart positions of "La Tortura"
Chart (2005)	Position
Austria (Ö3 Austria Top 40)	14
Belgium (Ultratop 50 Flanders)	22
Belgium (Ultratop 50 Wallonia)	10
Brazil (Crowley)	92
CIS (TopHit)	10
Europe (Eurochart Hot 100)	14
France (SNEP)	22
Germany (Media Control GfK)	24
Hungary (Rádiós Top 40)	9
Italy (FIMI)	17
Lebanon (Airplay Top 100)	7
Netherlands (Dutch Top 40)	3
Netherlands (Single Top 100)	14
Romania (Romanian Top 100)	3
Russia Airplay (TopHit)	11
Spain (PROMUSICAE)	4
Sweden (Hitlistan)	19
Switzerland (Schweizer Hitparade)	3
US Billboard Hot 100	60
US Hot Latin Songs (Billboard)	1
US Latin Pop Airplay (Billboard)	2
US Spanish Contemporary (Radio & Records)	2
US Tropical (Radio & Records)	1
Venezuela (Record Report)	2

2006 year-end chart positions of "La Tortura"
Chart (2006)	Position
Hungary (Rádiós Top 40)	45
Russia Airplay (TopHit)	161

2017 year-end chart positions of "La Tortura"
Chart (2017)	Position
Ukraine Airplay (Tophit)	150

=== Decade-end charts ===
Decade-end chart performance for "La Tortura"
Chart (2000s)	Position
CIS Airplay (TopHit)	103
Russia Airplay (TopHit)	83
US Hot Latin Songs (Billboard)	3
US Latin Pop Airplay (Billboard)	13

=== All-time charts ===
All-time chart performance for "La Tortura"
Chart	Position
US Hot Latin Songs (Billboard)	5

== Certifications and sales ==
Certifications and sales for "La Tortura"
Region	Certification	Certified units/sales
Austria (IFPI Austria)	Gold	15,000^{*}
Brazil (Pro-Música Brasil)	Platinum	60,000^{‡}
Canada (Music Canada)	Platinum	80,000^{‡}
Denmark (IFPI Danmark)	Gold	4,000^{^}
Germany (BVMI)	Gold	150,000^{^}
Italy	—	18,000
Italy (FIMI) since 2009	Gold	25,000^{‡}
Mexico (AMPROFON)	2× Diamond+3× Platinum	780,000^{‡}
Spain (Promusicae)	2× Platinum	120,000^{‡}
Switzerland (IFPI Switzerland)	Gold	20,000^{^}
United Kingdom (BPI)	Silver	200,000^{‡}
United States (RIAA)	32× Platinum (Latin)	1,920,000^{‡}
United States (RIAA) Mastertone	Platinum	1,000,000^{*}
Summaries
Worldwide	—	5,000,000
^{*} Sales figures based on certification alone.^{^} Shipments figures based on certification alone.^{‡} Sales+streaming figures based on certification alone.

== Release history ==
Release dates and formats for "La Tortura"
Region	Date	Format(s)	Label(s)	Ref.
United States	11 April 2005	Radio airplay	Epic; Sony BMG Norte	
United States	12 April 2005	Digital download	Epic	
Germany	17 May 2005	CD; maxi CD	Sony BMG	
Denmark	23 May 2005	Maxi CD	Sony BMG	
France	18 July 2005	CD	Epic (France)	

== See also ==
- List of best-selling Latin singles\
- List of number-one Billboard Hot Latin Songs of 2005
- List of number-one Billboard Latin Pop Airplay songs of 2005
- List of Romanian Top 100 number ones of the 2000s
