= Esta Noche Voy Contigo =

Single by Shakira

from the album Magia
- Released: 16 July 1991
- Recorded: 1990
- Studio: Aga Studios (Bogotá, Colombia)
- Genre: Latin pop
- Label: Sony Music
- Songwriter: Miguel Enrique Cubillos

Shakira singles chronology
"Lejos de Tu Amor" (1991)	"Esta Noche Voy Contigo" (1991)	"Sueños" (1991)

"Esta Noche Voy Contigo" (English: "Tonight I'm Going With You") is the third single released by Colombian singer-songwriter Shakira from her first studio album Magia. An upbeat Latin pop love song, it was released as a single in 1991. Shakira performed it in the same year on the Colombian television program Sábados Felices, which marked one of her earliest appearances in front of a national audience and contributed to her initial recognition as an artist.

== Background and composition ==
Shakira’s first studio album, Magia, was released when she was 14 years old. The album, featuring "Esta Noche Voy Contigo" among its tracks, represented her entry into the music industry as a young performer. Magia did not experience commercial success, selling only 1200 copies. The song and the album are available only from old physical records because Shakira blocked the re-release of her first two albums citing their "immaturity".

"Esta Noche Voy Contigo" is an upbeat Latin pop song with chorus lyrics "Esta noche voy contigo a bailar" ('Tonight I'm going to dance with you'). Described as a "celebration of dance," it is a love song like all songs on the album except "Gafas Oscuras".

== Legacy ==
In 1991, Shakira performed "Esta Noche Voy Contigo" on Sábados Felices, a Colombian television variety show. For the appearance, she wore a black cropped top, denim shorts, and knee-high black boots. The broadcast helped introduce her to a wider national audience.

Retrospectively, the performance has been described as an early milestone in Shakira's career. Reviewing the resurfaced viral video footage of the event, Semana noted her energy on stage, highlighting the appearance as an important step in her musical development that preceded her international success. Social media users similarly reacted with nostalgia to the footage, observing it as an early indication of her potential.

== Music video ==
The video for "Esta Noche Voy Contigo" was shot at Matecaña City Zoo with an elephant and by the "El Vigilante" statue in Pereira, Colombia, in June 1991.
