= Shakira =

Colombian singer-songwriter (born 1977)

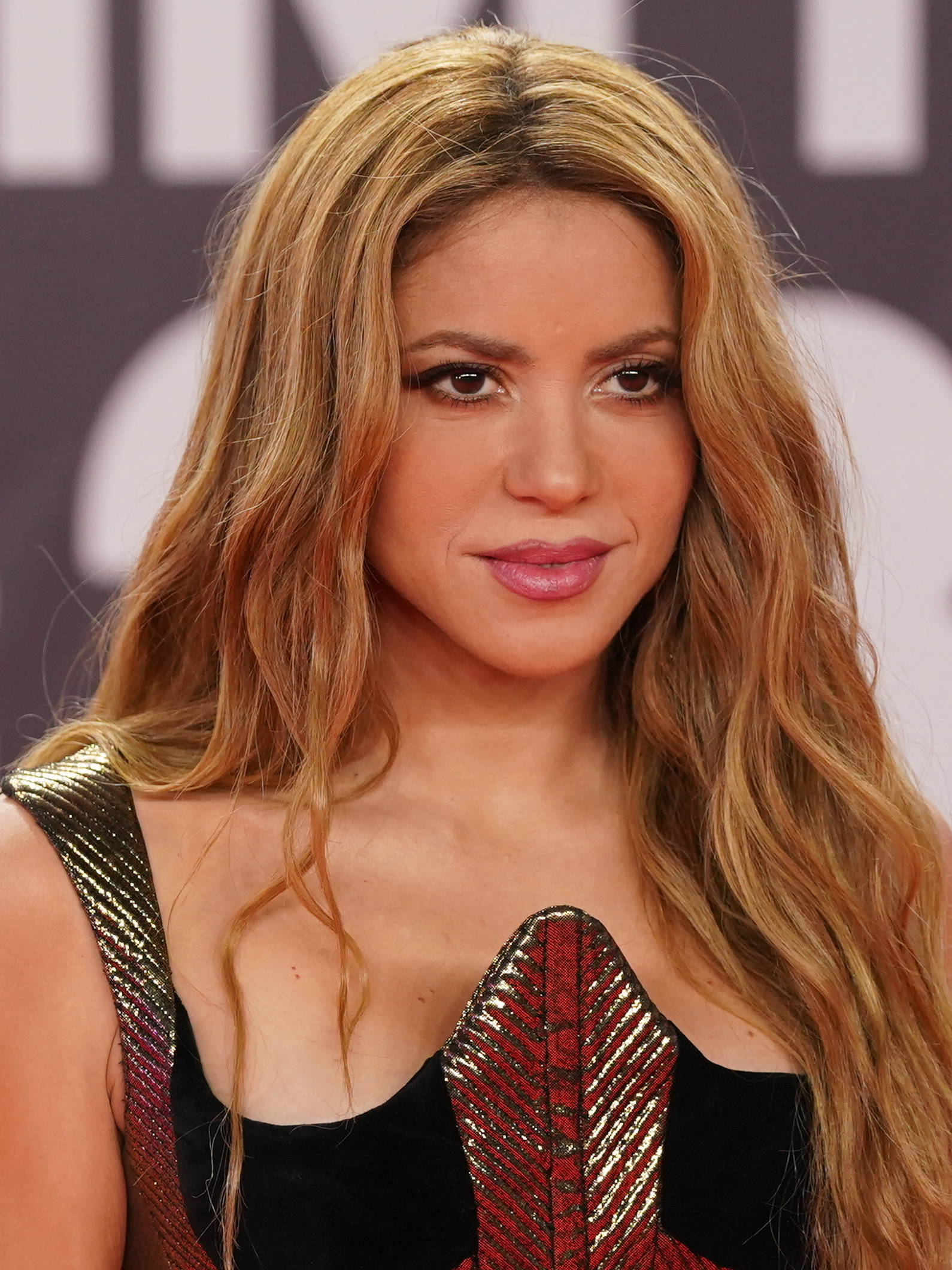
- Shakira at the 2023 Latin Grammy Awards
- Born: Shakira Isabel Mebarak Ripoll; 2 February 1977 (age 49); Barranquilla, Atlántico, Colombia
- Occupations: Singer; songwriter; dancer; record producer
- Years active: 1990–present
- Organization: Barefoot Foundation
- Works: Discography; songs recorded; videography; concerts; live performances
- Partners: Antonio de la Rúa (2000–2010); Gerard Piqué (2010–2022)
- Children: 2
- Awards: Awards; records; impact
- Musical career
- Origin: Bogotá, Colombia
- Genres: Latin; pop; dance; rock
- Instruments: Vocals; guitars; harmonica; drums
- Labels: Sony Colombia; Epic; RCA; Sony Latin
- Website: shakira.com (in Spanish and English)

Shakira Isabel Mebarak Ripoll (/ʃəˈkɪərə/ shə-KEER-ə, Spanish: [ʃaˈkiɾa isaˈβel meβaˈɾak riˈpol]; born 2 February 1977) is a Colombian singer-songwriter, dancer, and record producer. Referred to as the "Queen of Latin Music", (Note: Shakira has been referred to as "Queen of Latin Music", "Reina de la Música Latina" or "Rainha da Música Latina" by various publications, including Forbes, BBC Mundo, The Guardian, Marie Claire, Reuters, Billboard, El Espectador, Vanguardia MX, El Diario de Hoy, Correio da Manhã, Jornal Económico, and Monitor do Mercado.) she has had a significant impact on the musical landscape of Latin America and has been credited with popularizing Hispanophone music globally, contributing to increased learning and use of the Spanish language worldwide. She is also credited with opening the doors of the international market in popular music for other Latin artists. Her accolades include four Grammy Awards and fifteen Latin Grammy Awards.

Shakira made her recording debut with Sony Music Colombia at the age of 14. She rose to prominence with the albums Pies Descalzos (1995) and Dónde Están los Ladrones? (1998). Her first English release, Laundry Service (2001), sold over 13 million copies worldwide, becoming the best-selling album by a female Latin artist. Her success was further solidified with the Spanish-language albums Fijación Oral, Vol. 1 (2005), Sale el Sol (2010), El Dorado (2017), and Las Mujeres Ya No Lloran (2024), all of which topped the Billboard Top Latin Albums chart, making her the first woman with number-one albums across four different decades. Her English albums Oral Fixation, Vol. 2 (2005), She Wolf (2009), and Shakira (2014) achieved platinum status worldwide.

Shakira is among the world's best-selling musicians with numerous number-one singles, including "Estoy Aquí", "Ciega, Sordomuda", "Whenever, Wherever / Suerte", "Underneath Your Clothes", "Objection (Tango)", "La Tortura", "Hips Don't Lie", "Beautiful Liar", "She Wolf", "Waka Waka (This Time for Africa)", "Loca", "Rabiosa", "Can't Remember to Forget You", "Dare (La La La)", "La Bicicleta", "Chantaje", "Bzrp Music Sessions, Vol. 53", "TQG", and "Dai Dai". Shakira served as a coach on two seasons of the American singing competition television series The Voice (2013–2014), had voice roles in the animated films Zootopia (2016) and Zootopia 2 (2025), and executive produced and judged the dance competition series Dancing with Myself (2022). Billboard named her the Top Female Latin Artist of the Decade twice (2000s and 2010s), and she was nominated for the Rock and Roll Hall of Fame in 2026. Involved with the FIFA World Cup at various points since 2006, Shakira has been described as the tournament's artistic, publicity, and humanitarian icon.

Shakira has written or co-written the vast majority of music and lyrics she performed during her career and is regarded as an "international phenomenon", known for blending Western and Middle Eastern influences. She received the Latin Recording Academy Person of the Year and Harvard Foundation Artist of the Year awards in 2011, for her philanthropic and humanitarian work, such as the Barefoot Foundation, and was appointed to the President's Advisory Commission on Educational Excellence for Hispanics. Additionally, she was granted the honor of Chevalier of the Order of Arts and Letters by the French government in 2012, and advocates for equitable development of the Global South, the rights and interests of children, the Latino minority in the U.S. and Canada, women, and other under-represented groups.

== Early life ==
Shakira Isabel Mebarak Ripoll was born on 2 February 1977 in Barranquilla, a city located on the northern Caribbean coast of Colombia. She is the only child of William Mebarak Chadid and Nidia Ripoll Torrado. Her parents are of Lebanese, Catalan, and Colombian descent, though she has distant Italian roots through an ancestor with the surname Pisciotti. She was raised Catholic and attended Catholic schools. Shakira has eight older half-siblings from her father's previous marriage.

Shakira wrote her first poem, titled "La Rosa de Cristal" ('The Crystal Rose'), when she was four years old, and continued to write poetry. As her music interests developed, the poetry turned into song lyrics. When she was two years old, her half-brother was killed at the age of nineteen, in a motorcycle accident. Six years later, writing lyrics on her typewriter and having been given a guitar by her aunt, she composed her first song, titled "Gafas Oscuras" ('Dark Glasses'). It was inspired by her father, who for years wore dark glasses to hide his grief.

Shakira grew up in reasonably comfortable family conditions until her father, a jeweler, went bankrupt when she was eight. Her parents sent her to stay for a while with relatives in Los Angeles. When she came back, their two cars, furniture and color TV were gone and she had to adjust to a different reality. She was able to buy her parents a car when she was 14, after receiving some money for the release of the Magia album.

When she was four, Shakira's father took her to a local Middle Eastern restaurant, where she first heard the doumbek, a traditional festive Arabic music drum, also used to accompany belly dancing. Spontaneously, she climbed onto a table and started to dance; soon she wanted to do it for anyone who would watch. At her Catholic school, she demonstrated belly dancing on every Friday morning, encouraged by her parents, teachers and students in the audience, who were convinced of her bright future as a performer. A former classmate recalled, "Just her, singing and dancing on the stage." However, in second grade, Shakira was rejected for school choir because, according to the music teacher, her vibrato was too strong; classmates told her she sounded like a goat. She was often sent out of class because of her hyperactivity. To make Shakira appreciate more the modest conditions of her upbringing, her father took her to a local park so she could see orphans who lived there. The images stayed with her and she said to herself, "one day I'm going to help these kids when I become a famous artist". Having regained some confidence in her singing, she entered a local TV station talent contest when she was ten and won the top prize, a bicycle.

Between the ages of ten and thirteen, Shakira attended various events around Barranquilla and gained some recognition singing and dancing in the area. She met local theater producer Monica Ariza, who was impressed with her and told Sony Music Colombia executive Ciro Vargas about "a very talented girl who composed songs, sang and danced". He held an audition for her, liked the performance and arranged for other Sony Music people to be present during another audition in Bogotá. Shakira sang three of her songs there and was signed, at the age of 13, for recording of three albums to be released by Sony.

== Career ==
=== 1990–1993: Magia and Peligro ===
Shakira's debut album, Magia, was released in June 1991 under Sony Music Colombia. Recording began in 1990 when she was 13; the album consists of pop rock ballads and disco uptempo songs with Shakira writing the majority of the album's tracks. The album featured her debut single "Magia" as well as "Sueños" and "Esta Noche Voy Contigo". Magia was not a commercial success and only 1,200 copies were sold in Colombia. Little known outside of her native Colombia at the time, Shakira was invited to perform at Chile's Viña del Mar International Song Festival in February 1993. The festival gave aspiring Latin American singers a chance to present their songs and the winner was chosen by a panel of judges. Shakira's performance of the ballad "Eres" brought her the trophy for third place.

Shakira's second studio album, Peligro, was released in March 1993. It features the singles "Tú Serás la Historia de Mi Vida", "Eres", "Peligro", and "Brujería". Shakira was not pleased with the final result, taking issue mainly with the production. The album was better received than Magia had been, but it became another commercial failure. In 1993–1994, she acted in the Colombian telenovela El Oasis, playing the character of Luisa Maria.

Having been moved up in her classwork ahead of her age, Shakira graduated from a convent secondary school when she was 15, but her professional involvement in music prevented her from continuing formal education. At the Colegio La Enseñanza that she attended, the nuns expected students to visit the poorest areas of the town and help teach reading and writing to unschooled children there. "The seeds of their education are well-planted in my system. I believe in God. I believe in the sacraments" – Shakira told the interviewer in 2002. On starting her career so early, she said: "I wouldn't have done anything different myself ... though I think I missed out on adolescence. I never misbehaved when I was a teenager and that's something you've got to do. I was so focused on my goals. I was already an adult when I was 14. Maybe I'll have a belated adolescence when I'm old."

=== 1994–2000: Breakthrough with Pies Descalzos and Dónde Están los Ladrones? ===
In 1994, Shakira recorded "¿Dónde Estás Corazón?" for the compilation album Nuestro Rock Volumen II. After the song became a hit in Colombia, Sony Music Colombia decided to move forward with her third studio album. Shakira began writing and recording for the album with Luis Fernando Ochoa, who would become her principal music collaborator for the next three albums. Her third studio album, Pies Descalzos, was released in October 1995. It reached number five on the U.S. Billboard Top Latin Albums chart. The album spawned six singles, all of which peaked within the top 20 of the U.S. Latin chart: "Estoy Aquí", "¿Dónde Estás Corazón?", "Pies Descalzos, Sueños Blancos", "Un Poco de Amor", "Antología", and "Se Quiere, Se Mata"; the former two were top five hits. Pies Descalzos achieved top ranking in eight countries, and in August 1996 RIAA certified the album platinum in the U.S. Pies Descalzos eventually sold over 5 million copies. In October 1995, Shakira commenced Tour Pies Descalzos, her first international tour. Its about one hundred shows in Latin America, the U.S. and Spain took two years to complete.

In 1997, Shakira received three Billboard Latin Music Awards for Album of the Year for Pies Descalzos, Video of the Year for "Estoy Aqui", and Best New Artist. That year, she released the remix album The Remixes, of which over one million were sold. At 19, Shakira was named a national cultural ambassador by the president of Colombia, a distinction she shared with writer Gabriel García Márquez. Dónde Están los Ladrones?, Shakira's fourth studio album, was released in September 1998. It was recorded at the Miami studio of Gloria and Emilio Estefan. Artistic production was done by Shakira with Emilio Estefan listed as the executive producer. Dónde Están los Ladrones? became an even bigger worldwide hit than Pies Descalzos. The album reached a peak of number 131 on the U.S. Billboard 200 and held the top spot on the U.S. Latin Albums chart for 11 weeks. Over 7 million copies were sold worldwide, including 1.5 million in the U.S., making it one of the best selling Spanish albums there. Eight singles were taken from the album: "Ciega, Sordomuda", "Moscas en la Casa", "No Creo", "Inevitable", "Tú", "Si Te Vas", "Octavo Día", and "Ojos Así". "Ciega, Sordomuda" and "Tú" reached number one on the U.S. Latin chart.

In 1999, Shakira received a nomination for the Grammy Award for Best Latin Rock or Alternative Album. Her first live album, MTV Unplugged, was recorded in New York City as MTV Unplugged's first Spanish language broadcast on 12 August 1999 and released in early 2000. The performance was highly acclaimed by American critics; the album topped the Latin charts and sale statistics. In March 2000 Shakira embarked on Tour Anfibio, a two-month series of concerts in Latin America and the United States. In August 2000, she won an MTV Video Music Award in the category of People's Choice – Favorite International Artist for "Ojos Así". In September 2000, Shakira performed "Ojos Así" at the inaugural ceremony of the Latin Grammy Awards, where she was nominated in five categories: Album of the Year and Best Pop Vocal Album for MTV Unplugged, Best Female Rock Vocal Performance for "Octavo Día", Best Female Pop Vocal Performance for "Ojos Así", and Best Short Form Music Video for the "Ojos Así" video.

=== 2001–2004: Laundry Service and English transition ===
Upon the successes of Dónde Están los Ladrones? and MTV Unplugged, Shakira began working on an English crossover album. Her manager, Emilio Estefan, took an early notice of Shakira's potential for a "crossover" into the U.S. music market because of her "universally catchy pop-rock melodies, cerebral lyrics, unwavering self-determination and natural sex appeal". Shakira's English language skills were improved with the help of Gloria Estefan. "Whenever, Wherever", called "Suerte" in the simultaneously published Spanish language version, was released at the end of August 2001 as the first and lead single from Shakira's fifth studio album. The song took heavy influence from Andean music, including the charango and pan flute in its instrumentation. It became an international success by reaching number one in most countries. In the U.S., it reached number six on the Hot 100.

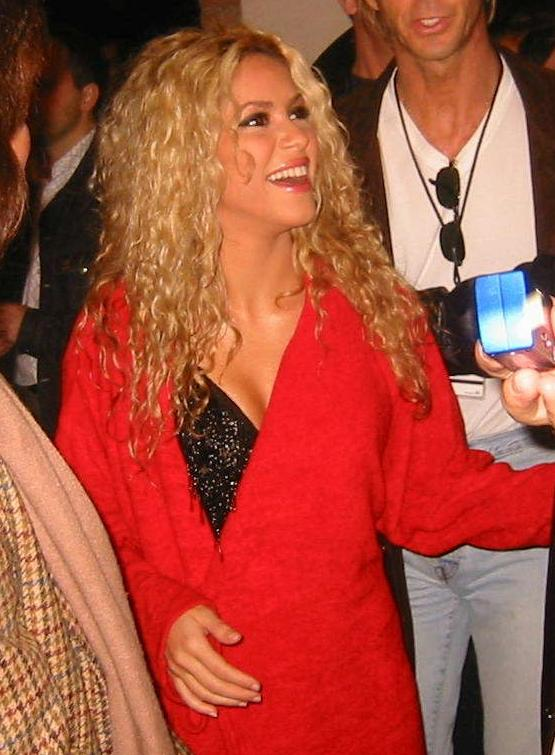
Shakira before entering the stage during her Tour of the Mongoose in 2003

The new album, titled Laundry Service in English-speaking countries and Servicio de Lavanderia in Latin America and Spain, was released on 13 November 2001. Servicio de Lavanderia features the same songs, arranged in different order. Nine out of thirteen tracks Shakira sings in English. The album debuted at number three on the U.S. Billboard 200 chart, selling over 200,000 records in its first week. It was later certified triple platinum. Its success established Shakira's musical presence in the mainstream North American market. "Underneath Your Clothes", "Objection (Tango)", "The One", "Te Dejo Madrid", "Que Me Quedes Tú", and "Poem to a Horse" were other Laundry Service songs issued as singles. Shakira wrote or co-wrote each of the songs and Laundry Service was produced by her alone. Critics gave Shakira's English-market debut mixed reviews, with some questioning her ability to write lyrics in a second language. Laundry Service became the best-selling album of 2002 and eventually more than 15 million copies were sold worldwide.

Laundry Service, the "crossover" transition process and its manifestations created a rift among Shakira's followers. The new album's detractors considered the singer a sellout and claimed that her now blond hair, English language singing and new look showed that she was "abandoning her essence" and "transforming into a whiter, sexier version of herself", one more "palatable for Anglo audiences". Shakira insisted that her only motivation for blonding her hair was her own vanity. Regarding the disgruntled fans, she replied: "I'm so sure of what I represent for my people and of what I am. I know that my roots are very well-planted in Latin America. And I feel proud of being Colombian and Latin, and I say it out loud to the rest of the world every time I can." Having opted now for musical stylistic "fusion", she told the Colombian newspaper El Tiempo in 2001: "Fusion offers me the opportunity to remove any type of label people want to place on me. It gives me freedom ... I don't want to be tied to a specific style and become the architect of my own prison."

Freddy DeMann took over Shakira's management from Emilio Estefan in 2000 and negotiated for her a multi-million dollar global promotional deal with Pepsi. Shakira released four songs for Pepsi: "Ask for More", "Pide Más", "Knock on My Door", and "Pídeme el Sol". Laundry Service: Washed and Dried album (CD and DVD) was issued in 2002. It comprises some remixes and alternative versions of songs from the original collection. Sony Music released Shakira's Spanish greatest-hits compilation, Grandes Éxitos. At Aerosmith's MTV Icon in April 2002, Shakira performed "Dude (Looks Like a Lady)". Also in 2002, she joined VH1 Divas Las Vegas. In August, she performed "Objection (Tango)" at the 2002 MTV Video Music Awards and won the International Viewer's Choice Award with "Suerte / Whenever, Wherever". She also won the Latin Grammy Award for the category of Best Short Form Music Video for the Spanish version of "Objection (Tango)". In October, she won five MTV Video Music Awards Latin America for Best Female Artist, Best Pop Artist, Best Artist – North (Region), Video of the Year (for "Suerte"), and Artist of the Year. In November 2002, Shakira embarked on the Tour of the Mongoose and 61 shows took place by May 2003. The tour was her first worldwide tour, as legs were played in North America, South America, Europe, and Asia. A CD and DVD live album, Live & off the Record, was released in 2004; three million sets were sold worldwide.

=== 2005–2007: Fijación Oral, Vol. 1 and Oral Fixation, Vol. 2 ===
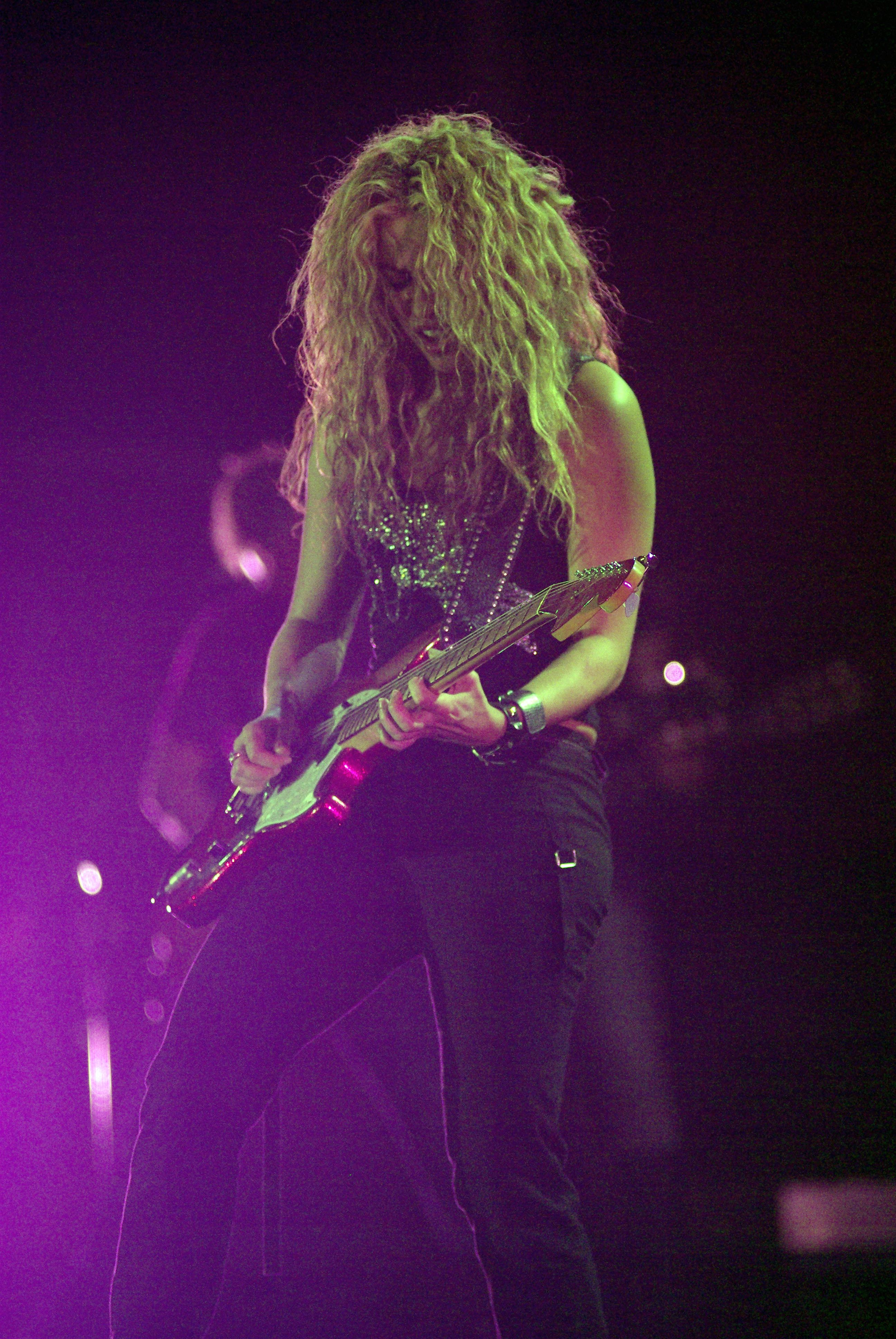
Shakira performing at the Rock in Rio festival in 2006

Preparing for her next productions, Shakira wrote sixty songs, in Spanish and in English. Out of these, she selected twenty to be used in two albums, separated by language. "La Tortura", the lead single from Shakira's sixth studio album Fijación Oral, Vol. 1, was released in April 2005 and features Spanish balladeer Alejandro Sanz. For a record 25 weeks, it remained on the Billboard Hot Latin Tracks chart. It reached number 23 on the Hot 100, number one in Spain and enjoyed high rankings across the world. "La Tortura" was one of the first Spanish-language songs to be performed at the MTV Video Music Awards; Shakira performed the song at the 2005 Awards in Miami.

Fijación Oral, vol. 1, released in June 2005, was well received in North America, South America, and Europe. It debuted at number four on the Billboard 200 chart, selling 157,000 copies in its first week and becoming the highest U.S. debut ever for a Spanish-language album. It has since sold over two million copies in the U.S., earning an 11× Platinum (Latin field) certification from the RIAA. In Venezuela, it earned a Platinum certification, in Colombia, a triple Platinum certification, while in Mexico demand exceeded shipments and it became unavailable after one day of sales. It was a top album in Spain, Italy, Greece and Germany. Four more singles were released from Fijación Oral, vol. 1: "No", "Día de Enero", "La Pared", and "Las de la Intuición". The album has sold over five million copies worldwide. On 8 February 2006, Shakira won her second Grammy Award, winning Best Latin Rock/Alternative Album. She received four Latin Grammy Awards in November 2006, winning in the categories of Record of the Year and Song of the Year for "La Tortura", Album of the Year and Best Female Pop Vocal Album for Fijación Oral, vol. 1.

Shakira's second English album and seventh studio album, Oral Fixation, Vol. 2, was released in November 2005. It debuted at number five on the Billboard 200, selling 128,000 copies in its first week. It went on to sell 1.8 million records in the U.S. and over eight million worldwide. The lead single for Oral Fixation, vol. 2, "Don't Bother", missed the top 40 on the U.S. Billboard Hot 100. In most countries worldwide, it reached the top 20. "Hips Don't Lie", which featured Wyclef Jean, was released as the album's second single in February 2006. It became Shakira's first number one single on the Billboard Hot 100. The song reached the number one spot in over 55 other countries and became the biggest-selling single of the 21st century worldwide. Shakira and Wyclef Jean performed the song at the closing ceremony of the 2006 FIFA World Cup. The third and final single from the album, "Illegal" featuring Carlos Santana, was released in November 2006.

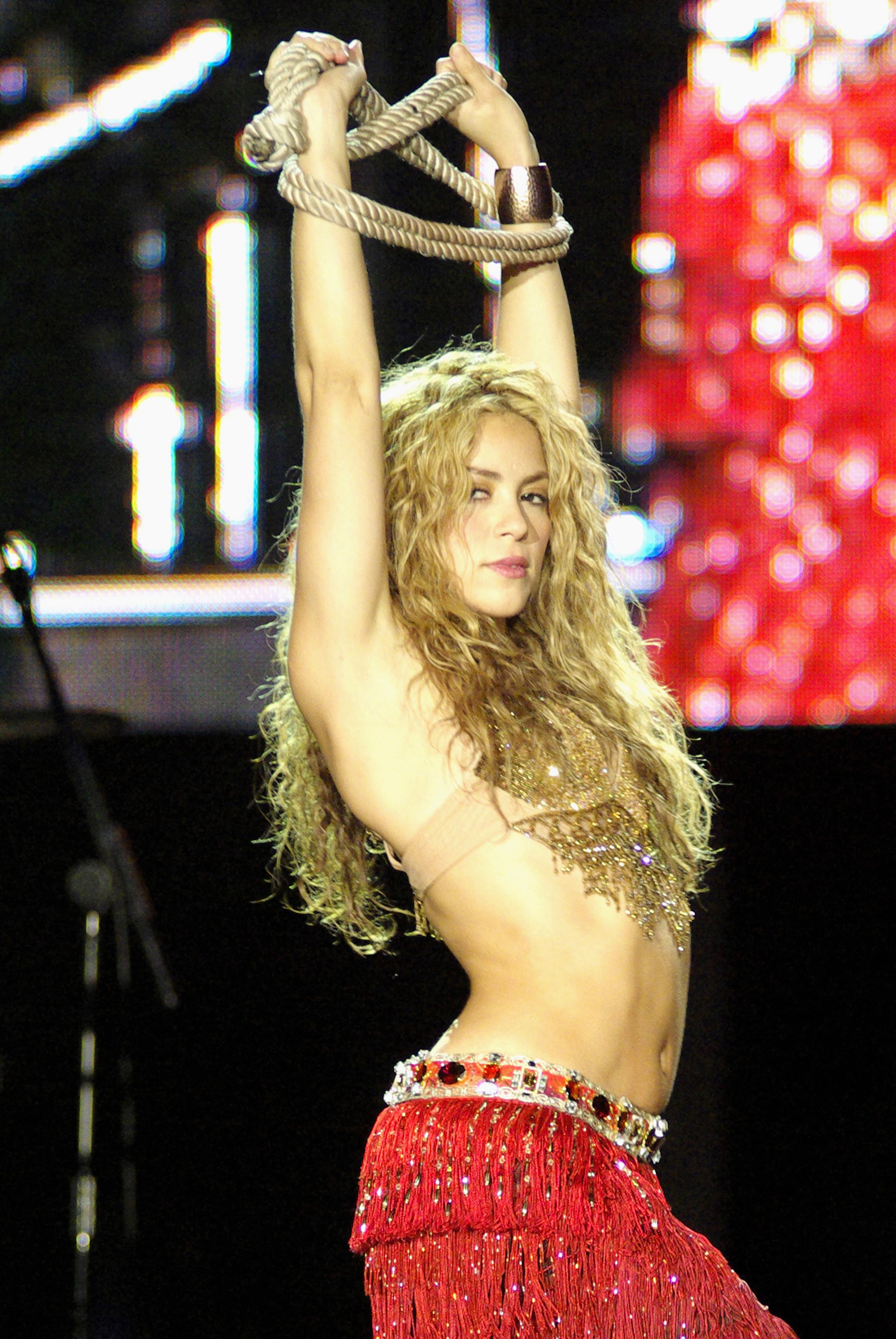
Shakira performing at the Rock in Rio festival in 2008

Shakira embarked on Oral Fixation Tour, which comprised 120 shows that took place between June 2006 and December 2007; five continents were visited. In 2006, she was honored with the Billboard Spirit of Hope Award for her Fundación Pies Descalzos. In February 2007, she performed at the 49th Annual Grammy Awards and earned the nomination for Best Pop Collaboration with Vocals for "Hips Don't Lie" with Wyclef Jean. Shakira's third live album, Oral Fixation Tour, was released in November 2007.

In late 2006, Shakira and Alejandro Sanz released the duet "Te Lo Agradezco, Pero No"; the song is featured on Sanz's album El Tren de los Momentos. "Te Lo Agradezco, Pero No" was a top ten hit in Latin America and topped the Billboard Hot Latin Tracks chart. Shakira also collaborated with Miguel Bosé on the duet "Si Tú No Vuelves", which was released in Bosé's album Papito. The American R&B singer Beyoncé and Shakira collaborated on the track "Beautiful Liar", which was released in 2007 as the second single from the deluxe edition of Beyoncé's album B'Day. In April, the single jumped 91 positions on the Billboard Hot 100 chart, from 94 to 3, setting the record for the largest upward movement in the history of the chart at the time. It was also number one on the official UK singles chart. "Beautiful Liar" earned them a nomination for the Grammy Award for Best Pop Collaboration with Vocals. In 2007, Shakira participated, together with 23 other female singers, in the recording of Annie Lennox's song "Sing" from the album Songs of Mass Destruction. Also in 2007, Shakira and Wyclef Jean recorded their second duet, "King & Queen", featured on Jean's album Carnival Vol. II: Memoirs of an Immigrant. She contributed three songs featured in the film Love in the Time of Cholera (2007): a version of "Pienso en ti" from her 1995 album Pies Descalzos, "Hay Amores" and "Despedida". "Despedida" was nominated for Best Original Song at the 65th Golden Globe Awards.

=== 2008–2009: She Wolf ===
In early 2008, Forbes named Shakira the fourth top-earning female artist in the music industry. In July, she signed a $312 million contract with Live Nation Entertainment, an international touring conglomerate, which was to remain in effect for ten years. According to the artist, the deal would encompass tours, recordings, sponsorship and merchandise worldwide. Her existing contract with Epic Records (Sony Music Entertainment) called for three more albums – one in English, one in Spanish, and a compilation, but the touring and other rights under the Live Nation contract were to begin immediately.

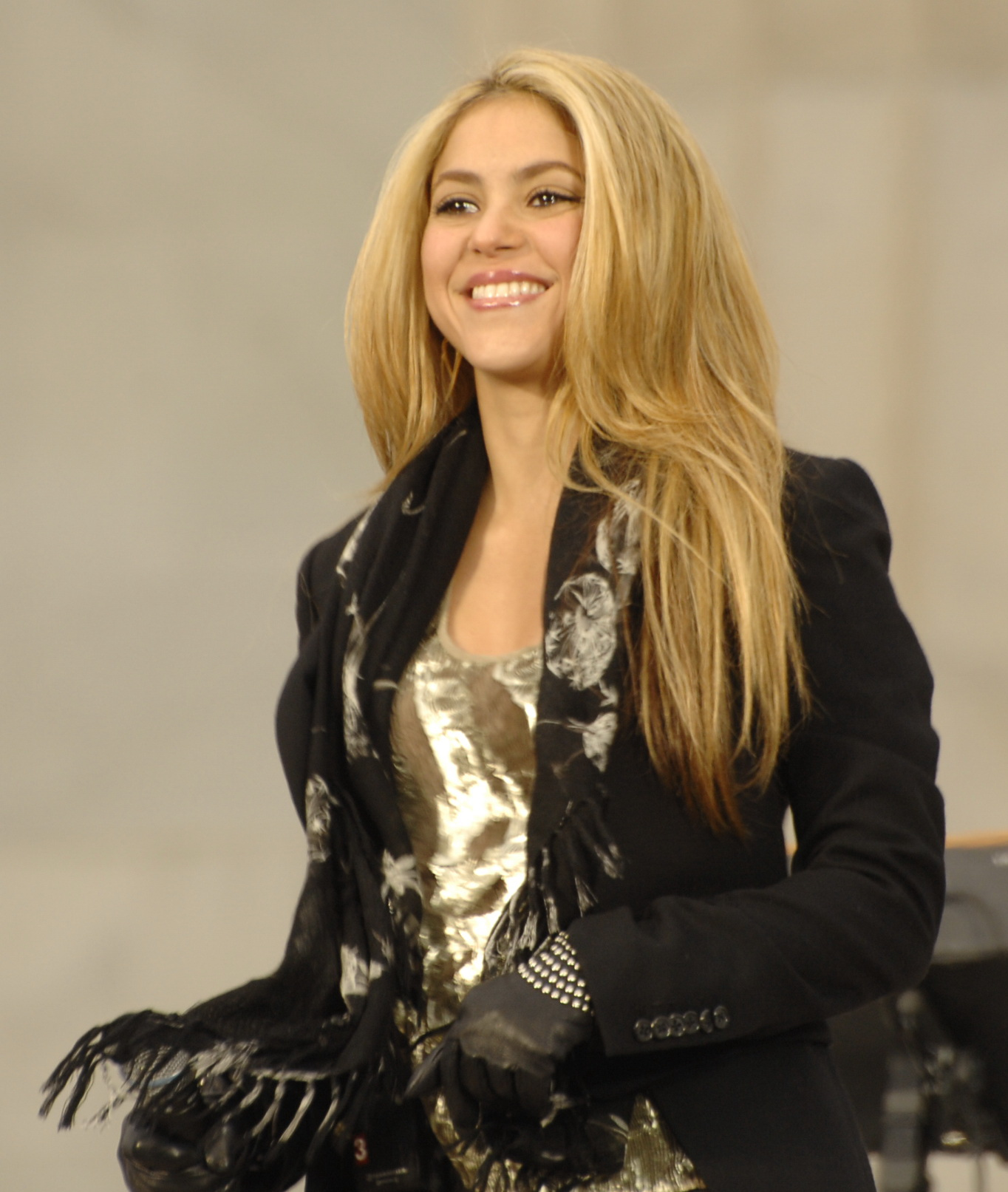
Shakira at We Are One: The Obama Inaugural Celebration at the Lincoln Memorial in 2009

On 17 May 2008, before an audience of over 150,000 people, Shakira was one of the artists who performed at the ALAS Foundation charity concert in Buenos Aires. Invited by Alejandro Sanz, she led the presentation of his song "No Es lo Mismo". Mercedes Sosa, Shakira and Pedro Aznar performed there a cover of Silvio Rodríguez's song "La Maza". On 18 January 2009, Shakira was among the participants of the "We Are One" festivities in honor of the inauguration of President Barack Obama, at the Lincoln Memorial in Washington, D.C. She sang "Higher Ground" with Stevie Wonder and Usher. In March 2009, a studio recording of "La Maza" by Sosa featuring Shakira was released on Sosa's album Cantora, un Viaje Íntimo.

In July 2009, Shakira released "She Wolf" as the lead single from an upcoming album with the same title. The single was a commercial success, receiving certifications in 17 countries. Her eighth studio and third (mostly) English album She Wolf was released in October 2009. It received mainly positive reviews from critics. Mike Diver on BBC Review saw in it "perhaps the most enjoyably varied pop album of 2009" but detected "a greater sense of passion in songs playing out in her native tongue". Beyond the chart-conquering smashes, Shakira had "often explored some truly mind-boggling pop territories, deep-drilling for veins of inspiration absolutely alien to so many of her peers". She Wolf was included in AllMusic's year-end Favorite Albums, Favorite Latin Albums, and Favorite Pop Albums lists. It reached number one on the charts of Argentina, Ireland, Italy, Mexico, and Switzerland. It also charted inside the top five in Spain, Germany, and the United Kingdom. It debuted at number fifteen on the Billboard 200. It was certified double-platinum in Colombia and Mexico, platinum in Italy and Spain, and gold in numerous countries including France and the United Kingdom. Over two million copies were sold worldwide, making She Wolf less successful in terms of sales than Shakira's other albums. Four singles were released off the album: "She Wolf", "Did It Again", "Give It Up to Me", and "Gypsy". "Good Stuff" was released as the album's sole promotional single. The heavily electronic She Wolf record was produced by Shakira.

=== 2010–2014: "Waka Waka", Sale el Sol and Shakira ===
In 2010, Shakira collaborated with the South African Afro fusion band Freshlyground to create the official song of the 2010 FIFA World Cup, "Waka Waka (This Time for Africa)". Released on 7 May 2010, "Waka Waka" was performed by Shakira at the World Cup kick-off and closing. The single reached the top 20 in several countries of Europe, South America and Africa and the top 40 in the U.S. "Waka Waka" has sold more than four million copies worldwide and is the biggest-selling World Cup song of all time. For her involvement with the World Cup related campaigns and other philanthropic work, Shakira received the 2010 Free Your Mind MTV award.

In October 2010, Shakira released her ninth studio album, the mostly-Spanish Sale el Sol. It received critical acclaim and was included in AllMusic's Favorite Albums of 2010 and Favorite Latin Albums of 2010 year-end lists. At the 2011 Latin Grammy Awards ceremony, Sale el Sol was nominated for Album of the Year and Best Female Pop Vocal Album, winning the award in the latter category. Commercially, the album was a success throughout Europe and Latin America. It peaked atop the charts of Belgium, Croatia, France, Mexico, Portugal, and Spain. In the U.S., it debuted at number seven on the Billboard 200 chart, marking the highest debut for a Latin album for the year; it was Shakira's fifth album to peak at number one in the Latin albums category. Its lead single, "Loca", was number one in several countries. "Sale el Sol", "Rabiosa", "Antes de las Seis", and "Addicted to You" were also released as singles. The album has sold ten million copies since its release.

In September 2010, Shakira embarked on the Sale el Sol World Tour. Countries in North America, Europe, South America, Asia, and Africa were visited, with 106 shows in all. The tour was met with positive reactions from critics, who praised her stage presence and energy. In August 2011, she participated in an episode of Dora the Explorer animated TV series. A song titled "Todos Juntos" by Dora, featuring Shakira, was released with a music video. Promoted with the single "Je l'aime à mourir", in December 2011 her fourth live album, Live from Paris, was released.

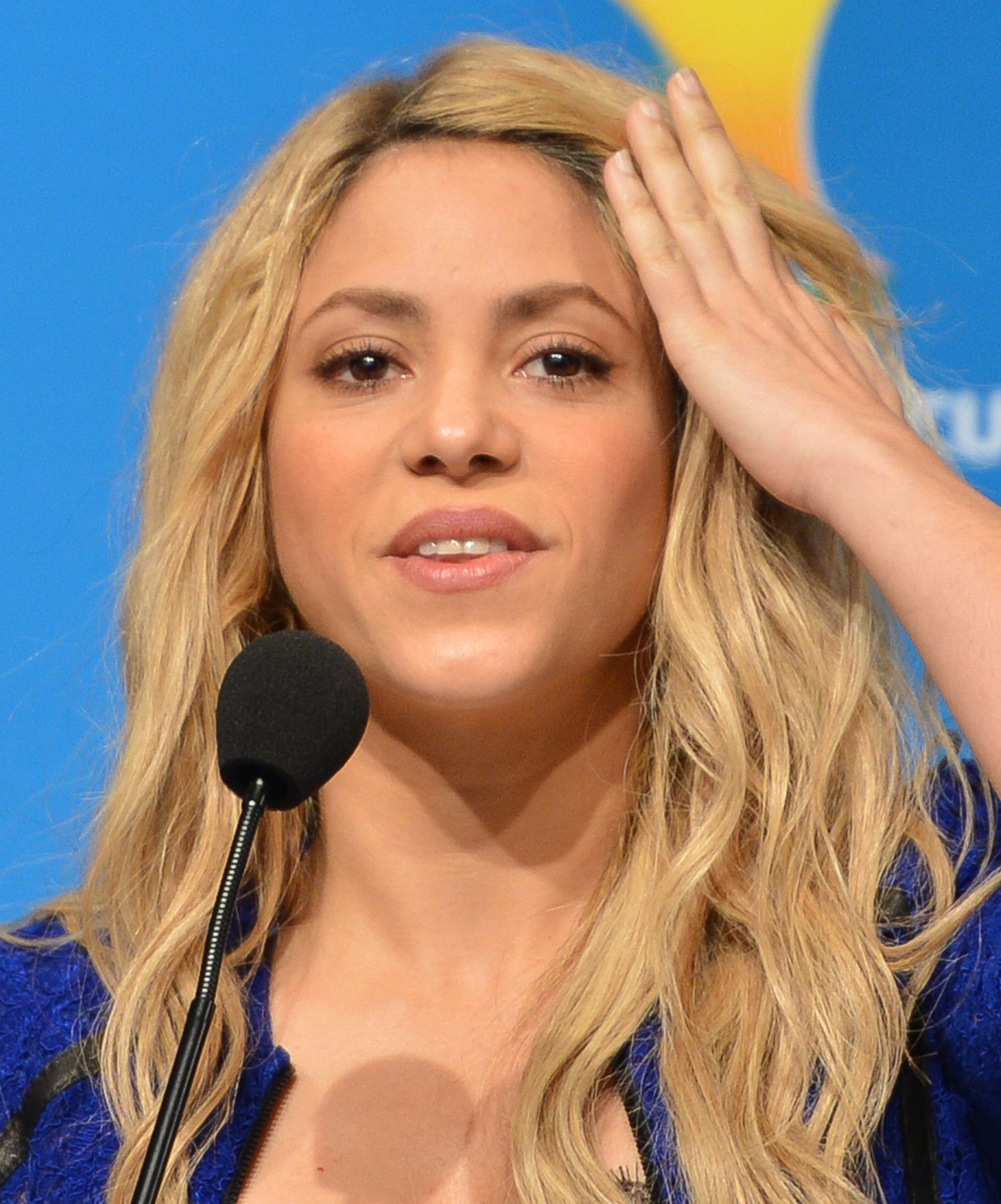
Shakira at a 2014 FIFA World Cup closing ceremony press conference

On 9 November 2011, Shakira was honored as Latin Recording Academy Person of the Year for her artistic achievements and philanthropic undertakings; she was the youngest of the musicians who had received this distinction. At the event, she performed a cover of Joe Arroyo's "En Barranquilla Me Quedo", as a tribute to the singer who had died earlier that year. In early 2012, Shakira signed to Roc Nation. She collaborated with rapper Pitbull for the song "Get It Started", a single from his 2012 album Global Warming. The single was released in June 2012. In September 2012, it was announced that Shakira and Usher would replace in March 2013 Christina Aguilera and CeeLo Green as coaches for the fourth season of the U.S. TV show The Voice. Shakira also served on the sixth season of the series. In January 2013, Ivete Sangalo released "Dançando", a single featuring Shakira, off Sangalo's album Real Fantasia. In February 2013, Draco Rosa released "Blanca Mujer", a duet with Shakira as a promotional single for his album Vida.

Shakira originally intended to release a new album in 2012, but plans to release a single and video were postponed due to her pregnancy. In December 2013 it was announced that Shakira's new single, "Can't Remember to Forget You", a duet with Rihanna, would be issued in January 2014. Shakira, the artist's self-titled tenth studio album, produced by her, was released in March 2014. Commercially, the album debuted at number two on the U.S. Billboard 200 chart with first-week sales of 85,000 copies. Shakira became the singer's highest-charting album on Billboard 200, although it also had her lowest first-week sales figure for an English-language album. The album spawned three singles. After releasing "Can't Remember to Forget You" and "Empire", RCA chose "Dare (La La La)" as the third single. The song "Medicine" was released as a promotional single off the album. On 13 July 2014, Shakira performed "La La La (Brazil 2014)" with Carlinhos Brown at the 2014 FIFA World Cup closing ceremony at the Maracanã Stadium in Rio de Janeiro.

=== 2015–2021: El Dorado ===
Shakira's work on her eleventh studio album, the mostly Spanish El Dorado, had been in progress from the latter part of 2015. Among her other projects was starring as a voice actress in the 2016 animated movie Zootopia. She voiced a character named Gazelle and sang a song titled "Try Everything". In May 2016, she collaborated with Colombian singer Carlos Vives on the track "La Bicicleta", which subsequently won the Latin Grammy Award for Record of the Year and Song of the Year. On 28 October 2016, Shakira released the single "Chantaje" with Colombian singer Maluma; the song was a track from the upcoming El Dorado. It became her most-viewed YouTube video, with over 2.1 billion views as of 1 June 2018. Maluma had previously created a remix to "La Bicicleta". Shakira was featured on the single "Comme moi" by French rapper Black M. "Comme moi" and its English version were also included on El Dorado. On 7 April 2017, the song "Me Enamoré" was released as the second official single from El Dorado.

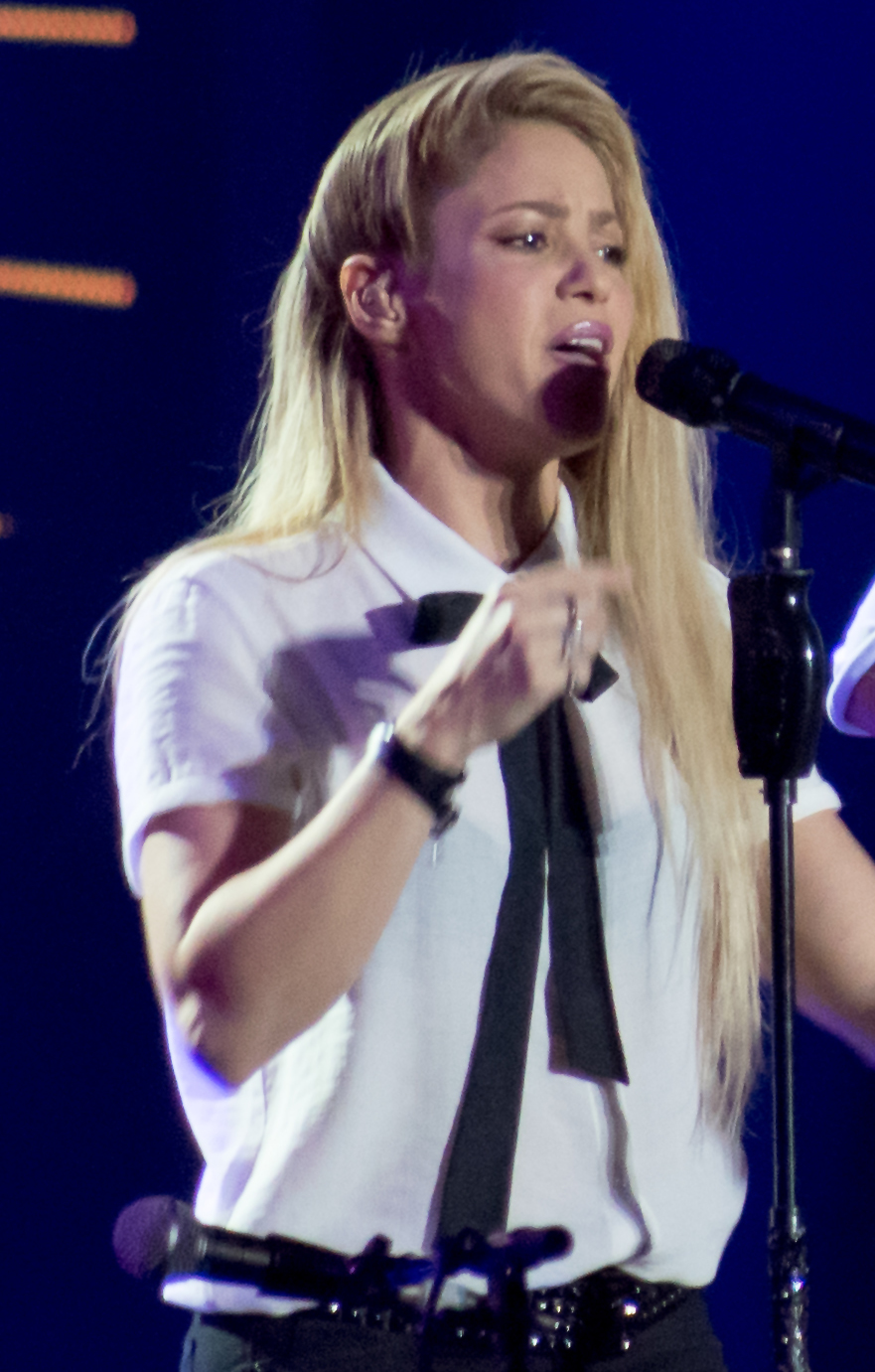
Shakira performing at the Global Citizen Festival in 2017

The El Dorado album, produced by Shakira, was issued on 26 May 2017. "Perro Fiel" featured American singer Nicky Jam. Its official release as El Dorado's third single took place on 15 September, the same date its music video, filmed in Barcelona, was premiered. Before being released as a single, "Perro Fiel" was already certified gold in Spain. "Trap" was released in January 2018 as the fourth single off the album, her second collaboration with Maluma. In January 2018, Shakira won her third Grammy Award for Best Latin Pop Album for El Dorado; it made her the only female Latin artist to have done so. The album also earned her a top Latin Grammy and she was recognized by a number of other prizes. With El Dorado, she had received thirteen Grammys overall, including ten Latin Grammys. El Dorado had over 10 billion streams, which made it one of the most-streamed female albums of all time.

The El Dorado World Tour was announced on 27 June 2017. After several postponements due to Shakira's vocal injuries, the tour commenced in Hamburg on 3 June 2018. The same month, she released "Clandestino", another collaboration with Maluma, as a standalone single. The European leg of the tour was followed by performances in Asia and in North America. The Latin American shows ended in Bogotá, the tour's last stop, on 3 November. A total of 54 concerts took place. On 3 November 2018, "Nada" was released as the fifth and final single off El Dorado. In October 2019, Shakira was featured on a remix of Camilo and Pedro Capó's single "Tutu". Shakira's fifth live album, Shakira in Concert: El Dorado World Tour, was released in November 2019. Forbes ranked Shakira among the world's highest-paid women in music in 2019, at number 10. In January 2020, she released "Me Gusta", a collaboration with Puerto Rican rapper Anuel AA.

On 2 February 2020, Shakira and Jennifer Lopez performed at the Super Bowl LIV halftime show. According to Billboard, the halftime show had a viewership of 103 million people, while 102 million watched the game itself. It was the most viewed halftime show by then on YouTube. Shakira called attention to the Afro-Colombian community by doing a traditional champeta dance break. She and Lopez appeared again in the finale of the event, jointly singing "Waka Waka". In May and June, Shakira participated in two television specials performing her songs during the COVID-19 pandemic: The Disney Family Singalong: Volume II (with "Try Everything") and Global Goal: Unite for Our Future (with "Sale el Sol"). In December 2020, she teamed up with Black Eyed Peas on the single "Girl Like Me", written as a tribute to Latin women. In January 2021, Shakira sold her catalog of 145 songs (publishing rights) to Hipgnosis Songs Fund. On 16 July 2021, she released a single titled "Don't Wait Up".

=== 2022–present: Las Mujeres Ya No Lloran ===
In 2022, Shakira began releasing singles from her then-upcoming twelfth studio album. The lead single was "Te Felicito", a collaboration with Rauw Alejandro, released on 21 April 2022. The song was nominated for Record of the Year at the 23rd Annual Latin Grammy Awards. On 19 May she was granted the Special International Award with Apple Music at the British Ivors Academy's Ivor Novello Awards. On 31 May, the dance competition show Dancing with Myself premiered on NBC; Shakira served as an executive producer and judge alongside Liza Koshy and Nick Jonas. The series was canceled after one season. In June, Shakira released "Don't You Worry", a collaboration with Black Eyed Peas and David Guetta. "Monotonía", a collaboration with Ozuna, was released in October as the second single from her twelfth studio album. It was the most-successful Spanish language debut of 2022, the biggest female solo debut on YouTube, and the biggest song debut in Shakira's career.

On 11 January 2023, the single "Shakira: Bzrp Music Sessions, Vol. 53" was released, a collaboration with DJ Bizarrap. It reached number one in 16 countries, achieved 14 Guinness World Records, and peaked at number nine on the Billboard Hot 100, marking Shakira's fifth top-ten in the U.S. and her first since "Beautiful Liar" (2007). She became the first woman to debut a Spanish language track in the top-ten of the chart. The song reached number two on the Billboard Global 200 and Global Excluding U.S. charts. A diss track aimed at Shakira's ex-partner, Gerard Piqué, the song achieved record-breaking success on streaming services and had a measurable cultural impact.

On 24 February 2023, the single ″TQG″ by Karol G and Shakira was released. Debuting in the U.S. at number 7, it broke the Guinness World Record for the highest-charting Spanish language track by a woman in the country. It debuted atop the Global 200, her first number one. Further singles from Las Mujeres Ya No Lloran, "Acróstico", "Copa Vacía", and "El Jefe" were released in May, June, and September respectively. On 29 July 2023, Shakira became the first woman to occupy the top three on the Latin Pop Airplay chart with "TQG" at the summit followed by "Acróstico" and "Copa Vacía" respectively. On 12 September, she received the Michael Jackson Video Vanguard Award at the 2023 MTV Video Music Awards and performed a medley of her hits. At the 24th Annual Latin Grammy Awards, she was nominated in seven categories, including Record of the Year and Song of the Year. Shakira became the first artist in the show's history to receive three nominations for Song of the Year in a single ceremony—with "Bzrp Music Sessions, Vol. 53", "TQG", and "Acróstico". She won Song of the Year and Best Pop Song for the former and Best Urban/Fusion Performance for "TQG".

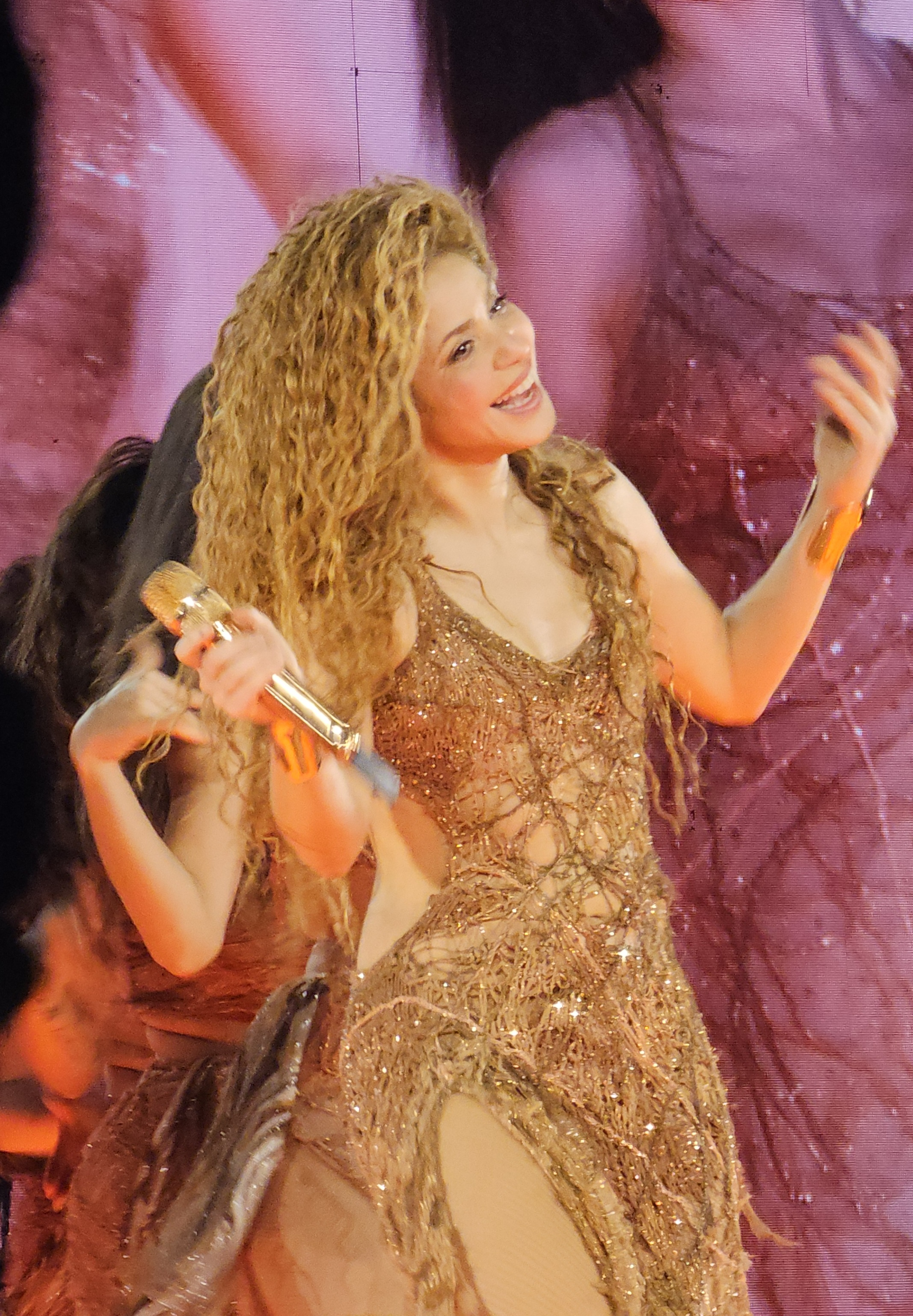
Shakira performing on the Las Mujeres Ya No Lloran World Tour in 2025

The all-Spanish Las Mujeres Ya No Lloran album was released on 22 March 2024 through Sony Music Latin. She called the creative process "alchemical" and that it turned her "tears into diamonds" and her "vulnerability into strength". The album received generally positive reviews from music critics. Las Mujeres Ya No Lloran debuted at number 13 on the U.S. Billboard 200, with 34,000 album-equivalent units sold in its first week. It debuted atop the Top Latin Albums and Latin Pop Albums charts, making Shakira the first woman with number one albums across four decades on the Billboard Latin album charts. It was certified seven-times platinum (Latin) upon release. "Puntería", a collaboration with rapper Cardi B, was released as the eighth single in tandem with the album, followed by "(Entre Paréntesis)", the album's ninth and final single on 25 March. "Puntería" reached number one on the Latin Airplay, Latin Pop Airplay, and the Regional Mexican Airplay charts, her first chart-topper on the latter. On 26 March, Shakira held a free pop-up concert in New York's Times Square. On 12 April 2024, at Coachella Festival in California, she made a guest appearance during Bizarrap's set, performing their two collaborations.

On 14 July, Shakira performed several of her hits at the 2024 Copa América final, Argentina vs. Colombia match, at the Hard Rock Stadium in Miami Gardens, Florida. It was the first halftime show at a soccer championship game. On 25 September, she released the single "Soltera". Topping the Latin Pop Airplay chart and reaching number two on Latin Airplay, it tied her with Enrique Iglesias for the most number ones on the former chart. In May 2025, "Soltera" received the Favorite Latin Song award at the American Music Awards, making Shakira the most-awarded female Latin artist in the show's history. She received three nominations at the 25th Annual Latin Grammy Awards, including Album of the Year for Las Mujeres Ya No Lloran and Song of the Year for "(Entre Paréntesis)". At the 67th Annual Grammy Awards, Las Mujeres Ya No Lloran received the Grammy Award for Best Latin Pop Album.

The Las Mujeres Ya No Lloran World Tour commenced in February 2025, Shakira's first tour since 2018. Initially planned to begin in North America in November 2024, it was rescheduled to begin in February 2025 in South America, reportedly due to demand for larger venues in the U.S.; a number of dates were later added across multiple countries. In addition to the Americas, Shakira planned to take her show to Europe, Asia, and the Middle East, but several performances planned in Arab countries and India were canceled because of security concerns caused by the Iran war. A Todo Mundo show took place on 2 May on the Copacabana Beach in Rio de Janeiro before Shakira's largest ever audience, an estimated 2 million. The tour broke several sales records and became the highest-grossing and attendance Latin tour ever, with about 120 shows having taken place, over $534 million generated and more than 4 million tickets sold as of October 2026.

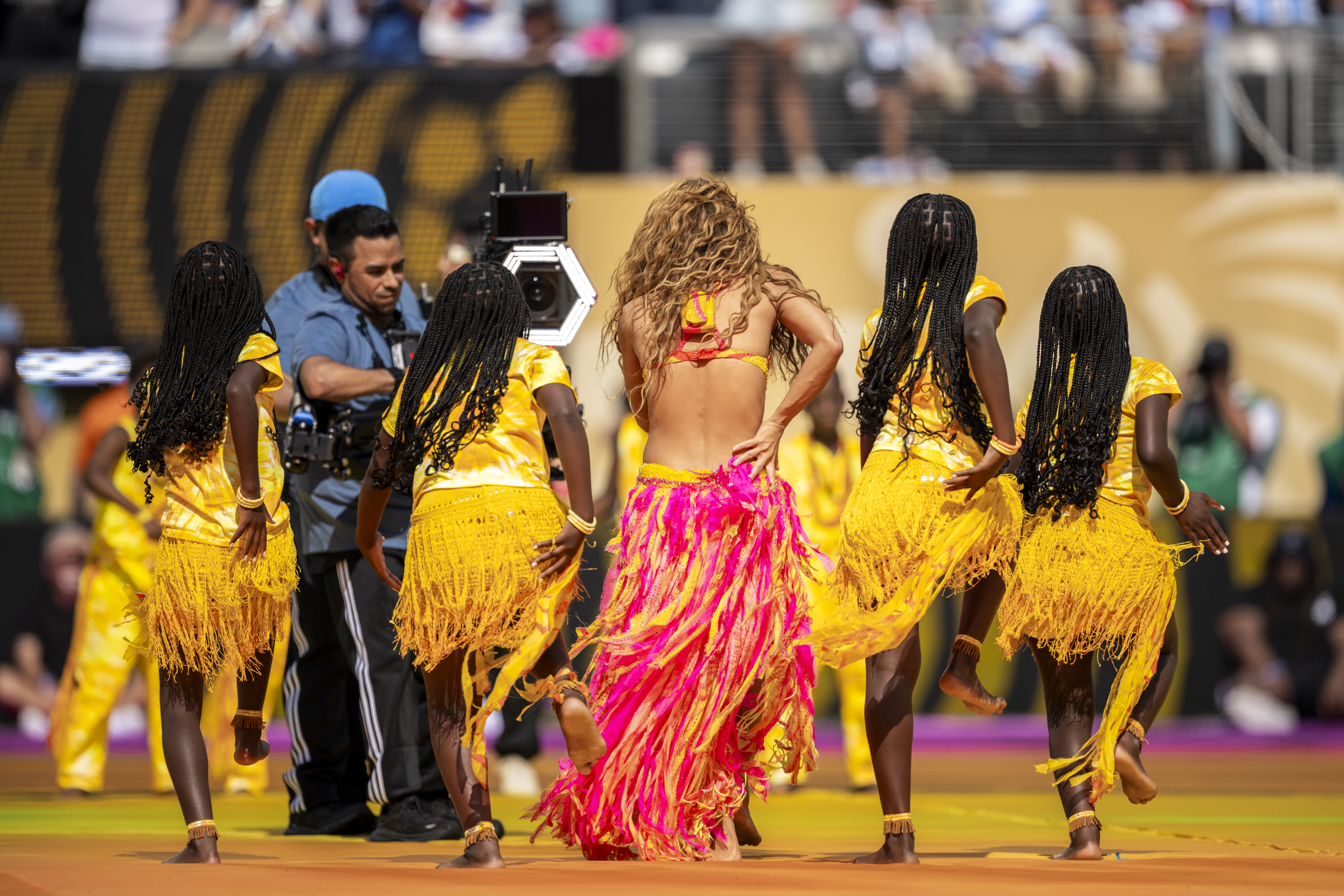
Shakira performing Dai Dai with the Ghetto Kids at the 2026 FIFA World Cup final halftime show in New Jersey

Shakira performed with Wyclef Jean on The Tonight Show Starring Jimmy Fallon on 6 May 2025 for the 20th anniversary of "Hips Don't Lie". On 23 May 2025, Shakira and Alejandro Sanz released the duet "Bésame", their third collaboration. On 22 October, to celebrate the 30th anniversary of Pies Descalzos and 20th anniversary of the two Oral Fixation albums, Shakira released Anniversary: Oral Fixation (20th) and Pies Descalzos (30th) Live, a five-track EP recording of a Spotify concert featuring live versions of past hits. She performed with special guests Luis Fernando Ochoa, Ed Sheeran, Beéle, and the New York Philharmonic Chamber Orchestra.

On 4 March 2026, Shakira and Beéle released the single "Algo Tú". On 9 April, Anitta and Shakira released "Choka Choka", a single from Anitta's upcoming album Equilibrium. Shakira's official 2026 FIFA World Cup song "Dai Dai" features Burna Boy. Shakira and Burna Boy performed the song at the World Cup opening ceremony on 11 June in Mexico City, as well as at the 2026 FIFA World Cup final halftime show on 19 July in New Jersey. On 18 September 2026, the fourth collaboration with Maluma "Agua" was published through Sony Latin.

== Artistry ==
=== Influences ===
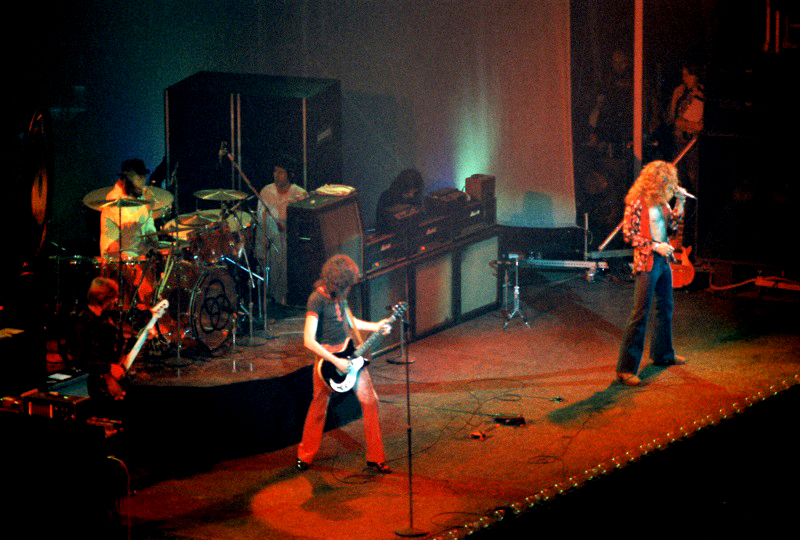
Led Zeppelin, one of Shakira's influences early in her career

From her early teens, Shakira was influenced by rock music, listening heavily to such bands and performers as Led Zeppelin, Metallica, Nirvana, The Beatles, the Police, The Cure, Tom Petty, and Aerosmith. According to Shakira, "Underneath Your Clothes" (2001) is where she shows her devotion to music of the Beatles. Her other influences included Madonna, Sheryl Crow, Alanis Morissette, Janis Joplin, Billie Holiday, Marc Anthony, and Van Morrison. She cited Depeche Mode's "Enjoy the Silence" as the song that made her appreciate the power of the electric guitar and "kick started her passion for music". She credited Gloria Estefan for "opening a big heavy door that was closed for many years" for Latin musicians in the U.S., facilitating the kind of progress that Shakira herself was able to make later.

=== Musical style ===
Shakira is the first artist of the rock en español generation to become a star in the U.S. ... (Rock and native styles) fusion has been the signature of rock en español from the very beginning. This genre was conceived to combine a rock foundation with elements of roots music from Spanish-language cultures. Shakira is the daughter of this egalitarian cultural confluence. That's why her music seems so natural, in either language.

— Los Angeles Times. Agustin Gurza, 29 October 2006.

Shakira's music spans multiple genres. Her earlier albums, Pies Descalzos and Dónde Están los Ladrones?, are primarily rock with elements of folk music. Pies Descalzos (1995) utilizes aspects of reggae, dancehall, bossa nova, and bachata among its styles. The Remixes (1997) features extended electronic dance music tracks. In the 1998 Dónde Están los Ladrones?, she blended Latin rock with elements of pop and Middle Eastern music, lyrics and dance influences that reflected her Lebanese heritage.

With her first mostly-English album, Laundry Service (2001), Shakira diversified into various pop music genres, pop rock and Latin pop. The singer credited this to her mixed ethnicity and background, saying: "I am a fusion. That's my persona. I'm a fusion between black and white, between pop and rock, between cultures – between my Lebanese father and my mother's Spanish blood, the Colombian folklore and Arab dance I love and American music."

The Spanish language Fijación Oral, Vol. 1 (2005) features reggaeton beats and dancehall elements. The English Oral Fixation, Vol. 2 (2005), a sister album, followed and brought Shakira back "into mainstream pop and rock". "Hips Don't Lie" with Wyclef Jean mixes salsa with reggaeton and cumbia. She Wolf (2009) is primarily an electropop album. With its electronic, clubby sound, the album contrasts sharply with the music Shakira had released before.

Shakira's next album, the mostly-Spanish Sale el Sol (2010), was meant to be a return to her beginnings. Reggaeton, merengue and cumbia are among the styles utilized. With the Shakira (2014) album, she generally retreated into the mainstream pop music range, with elements of reggae, dance, rock, and country. On El Dorado (2017), Shakira utilizes the styles of música urbana. Las Mujeres Ya No Lloran (2024) brings a variety of moods and genres, including Afrobeats, bachata and Tex-Mex rhythms.

=== Dance and stage appearance ===
Next to performing music, Shakira is dedicated to dancing. She credited her belly dance-derived dancing with helping her overcome shyness. Her distinctive style is said to combine Latin dancing with Middle Eastern belly dance, which she was exposed to because of her Lebanese heritage. As Shakira said, "because my father is of 100 percent Lebanese descent, I am devoted to Arabic tastes and sounds". She told MTV that she learned how to belly dance by trying to flip a coin with her belly. Her hip shaking is mentioned, for example, in Fifth Harmony's "Brave Honest Beautiful" song, where the girl group members claim they can "dance like Beyoncé" and "shake like Shakira".

In her earlier live performances, Shakira was noted for usually employing minimal production, taking to the stage with little makeup and, until and including the El Dorado World Tour, without or with few background dancers. She preferred to focus on her vocals, dance moves, and stage presence. In 2006 she confessed, however, to "getting lost in a cloud of hairdressers, make-up artists and assistants" for years, but declared "reclaiming her image" and doing her own make-up.

Shakira had spoken of being a "control freak", wanting to do and be involved with "everything" on "her ship" by herself. "So I get involved in every part of my career. I'm in total control. Sometimes I feel like my mind is going to explode, but I can't change it. I've tried to delegate, but believe me, it doesn't work". On being a perfectionist, she said, "I'm not as confident as people think. ... I still have that monster inside of me that wants to do everything better and right."

The stage has been the one and only place of public exposure where Shakira feels uninhibited. She greatly enjoys performing before large gatherings, but feels uncomfortable when the number of spectators is small. "The stage and crowd and lights and applause of the people dress me. Once you take that away and you're there with your voice—it's such a private, intimate act, the one of singing and exposing your soul." She easily and naturally connects and bonds with stadiums full of fans and demonstrates in such settings "boundless self-confidence".

Beginning in her twenties, Shakira dyed her black hair blond (first) and often performed barefoot (later). For her light-dyed hair (on account of which she has been called a "sellout"), she gave an interviewer the following explanation: "But it wasn't a calculated move. It wasn't like, Oh, I want to reach the American audience—let me be blonde and let me get a pair of blue contact lenses and bleach my skin. I didn't want to be white. I just thought my curls looked cool with a blonde, beachy style". However, a fan wrote: "she's got to dye her hair blond and bare her body ... to succeed in the United States". Between Shakira's MTV Unplugged (1999) and Roseland Ballroom (2001) Manhattan shows, with the Tour Anfibio transition intervening in 2000, her stage appearance and style changed dramatically. "Her previous look was just as pretty, but the new one is tougher and wilder", noted in December 2001 Frank Kogan in The Village Voice. To Ted Kessler of The Observer (2002), Shakira "did look like a Latino Britney", with her "all bleached blonde curls" and a "tiny 5ft frame", "but as soon as she opened her mouth, she slipped into gear and motored powerfully past Britney's breathy bump'n'grind".

=== Songwriting ===
Shakira has written several hundred songs, of which at least several dozen have become widely-known hits. Music industry executive and artist manager Merck Mercuriadis praised Shakira's songwriting footprint, saying in 2021: "what no one should ever take for granted is that she is one of the most serious and successful songwriters of the last 25 years, having written or co-written virtually every song she has ever recorded". Isabelia Herrera, a music editor, critic and curator, wrote of Shakira's "fascinating, idiosyncratic songwriting". Shakira is fluent in several languages, having written and recorded songs in English, Spanish, and Portuguese, among others.

=== Singing ===
Shakira is a contralto and is known for her "unique and mesmerizing" singing voice, which includes her "trademark" yodeling. Ted Kessler described her as having "the range of an operatic diva". "She's a rock girl through and through. Her singing is full-throated and urgent, her manner commanding onstage or on record" – wrote in 2002 Evan Wright of the Rolling Stone magazine. Alexandra Zacharella wrote for the UT Tyler's College of Music Society that "Shakira's vocal stylings have been compared to Spanish yodeling and it is her very Arabic roots that shape her vocal inflections and the use of double harmonic scales and the Major Locrian scale in her compositions".

=== Instruments ===
In her pre-Laundry Service rock performances, Shakira played harmonica extensively. Professional guitar technician Drew Foppe, who has worked with Shakira on several of her tours, spoke on her instrument playing and competence:

She can play the guitar just fine. She plays both acoustic and electric guitars on stage. There really isn't anything that happens on stage that she isn't in complete control over, from the tones, arrangements, and the overall look of everything. It's her baby, so to speak. She isn't really a gear nerd. However, she knows exactly what she wants things to sound like from every single instrument on stage. ... The aesthetics of how a piece of gear looks is just as important as how it sounds with Shakira.

== Legacy ==
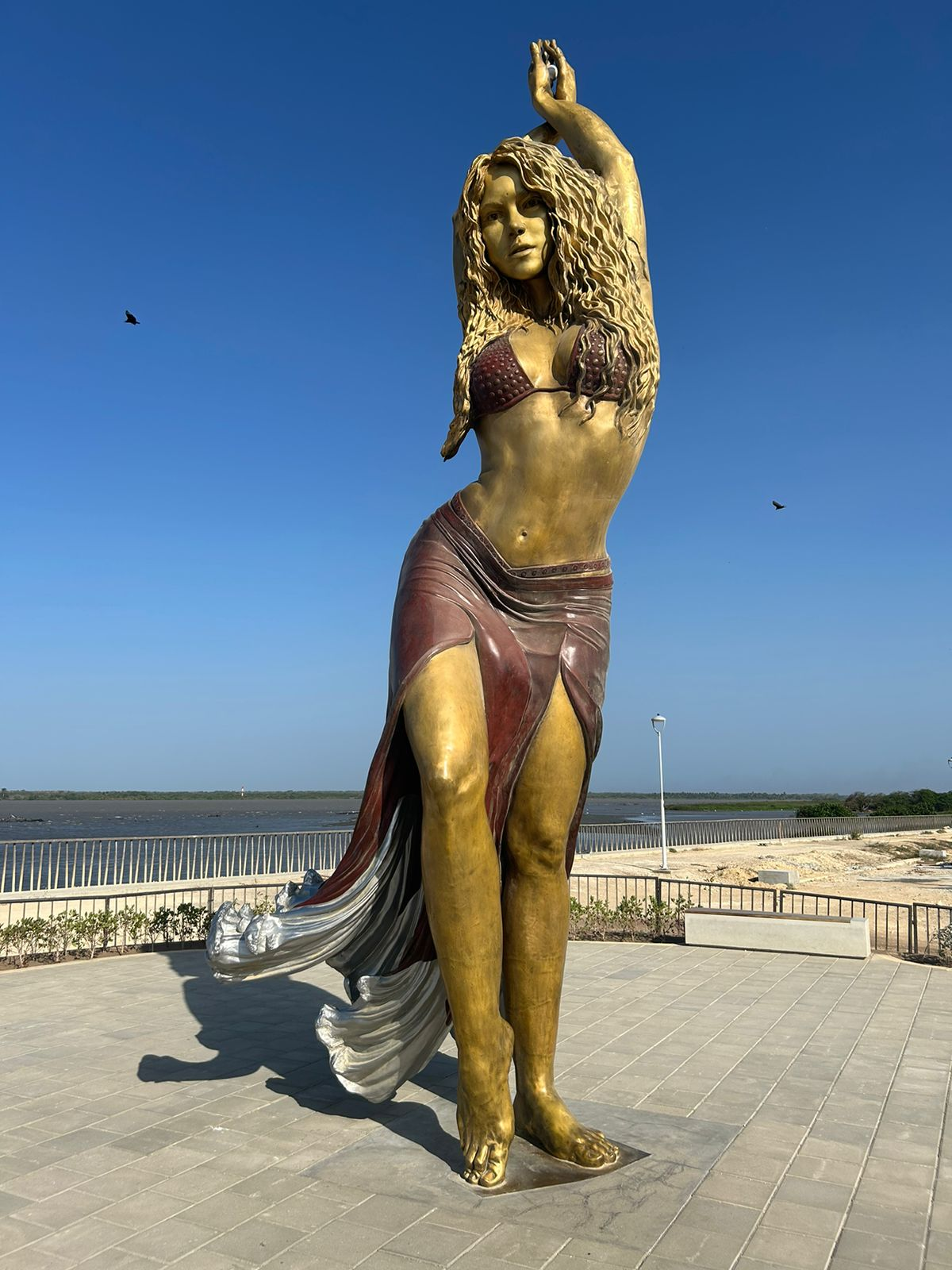
A 21-foot bronze statue of Shakira erected in 2023 in Barranquilla, Colombia

Shakira is a prominent figure in Latin and world music. Steve Huey of AllMusic described her as a "wildly inventive diva who created a cross-cultural pop sound rooted in her native Colombia but encompassing nearly every territory in the world." Fiona Sturges of The Independent named Shakira an "international phenomenon". "With her Lebanese ancestry and English-language songs [...] Shakira showed how universal a Latin artist could be. At the same time, in a difficult balance, she has tried to stay Latin American", wrote in 2009 in The New York Times Magazine Scott Malcomson. In 2018, The New York Times called her "a titan of Latin Pop", adding that "the seemingly ageless singer-songwriter" had produced, over almost three decades, rock, pop, and reggaeton.

In September 2017, Time magazine referred to Shakira as a "pop legend". In December 2020, Entertainment Tonight perceived Shakira as "one of the most influential artists of the 21st century". Shakira has been called "the crossover queen" by The Economist, "the queen of the World Cup" by Billboard, and "Latin America's pop queen" by Pitchfork. Billboard noted that Shakira's music videos had "redefined the role of dancing in music videos", seeing her as the best Latin female music video artist of all time.

The authors of the book Reggaeton, published by Duke University Press, credited Shakira with popularizing the reggaeton genre in North America, Europe and Asia. The Public Broadcasting Service wrote after the release of the album Shakira: "Gloria Estefan, Ricky Martin and Shakira are the most successful artists of the so-called Golden Age of Latin Music which reshaped America's cultural landscape for the twenty-first century". Alongside her impact on Latin and mainstream popular culture, Shakira has also influenced popular culture in the Arab world. In a publication titled Popular Culture in the Arab World: Arts, Politics, and the Media, author Andrew Hammond wrote: "Inspired by the success of Colombian singer Shakira, [...] singers like Lebanon's Nawal El Zoghbi and Morocco's Samira Said have shifted their image and sound in an attempt to follow in her footsteps". On the other hand, the newspaper El Correo del Golfo wrote that Shakira was the greatest exponent of Middle Eastern music in the West, citing her interest in Arabic music and dance.

In 1999, Shakira's MTV Unplugged concert was the first time an "unplugged" episode was broadcast entirely in Spanish. It became her major breakthrough in the U.S. music market. A Latin performance and a Latina solo act were unprecedented in the series. In 2001, "Whenever, Wherever" music video was aired on MTV with both the English and Spanish versions. It was reportedly the first time the U.S. MTV had aired a Spanish-language video. "La Tortura" was the first full Spanish-language music video to air on MTV without an English version. In 2018, "Hips Don't Lie" was selected as one of the greatest songs by 21st-century female artists by National Public Radio, ranked at number 65. "Waka Waka (This Time for Africa)" was called by Billboard "the most successful World Cup anthem ever" (2018).

Published by the U.S. Bureau of International Information Programs, the journal Global Issues (2006) cited Shakira as one of the celebrities "in today's globalized world" who "made it big by sharing the uniqueness of their talent and culture with the global community". In 2010, Google revealed that Shakira was the most searched female entertainer of the year. In 2020, she was the most Googled musician / band of the year and the 7th most searched person.

Shakira's global success differs from that achieved by other famous Latino singers such as Jennifer Lopez, Gloria Estefan or Enrique Iglesias, because it has been accomplished by a star who grew up in South America, the first one of this type to crossover globally. Shakira's expansion inspired other Latin American artists to attempt crossing over into the U.S. music market. According to Spin, Shakira paved the way for such Latin artists as Maluma and J Balvin to crossover. Lucas Villa summarized in the Paper magazine (2020): "In her wake, Colombia has become a hotspot for talent with recent exports like J Balvin, Maluma and Karol G. As Latin music continues to become a global force, we can't forget to remember Shakira's impact in the movement." Other artists have cited Shakira as an influence, expressed their admiration for her, or desire to work with her. The list includes Rihanna, Taylor Swift, Selena Gomez, Katy Perry, Christina Aguilera, Justin Bieber, Maluma, Ozuna, Ed Sheeran, Anitta, Cardi B, and Beyoncé, among others.

Shakira's influence has transcended the boundaries of pop culture; she has become a socio-political influencer and was named as one of the "World's Greatest Leaders" of 2017 by Fortune. In November 2010, The Independent argued that Shakira is a "living proof that pop and politics can mix". The newspaper wondered how she "balances battling poverty with squeezing into sequinned bikinis", but noted that because of her stature and through her efforts she is able to have "the ear of the global political elite". The Guardian published in November 2009 an essay by Euan Ferguson titled "The making of Saint Shakira". Among its topics are Shakira's impact on Colombia's social change, especially in the area of childhood education, and her ability to effectively discuss issues with such world leaders as Barack Obama and Gordon Brown. He wrote: "she not only knows what she's talking about, but puts her money where her mouth is ... she's Madonna gone right".

=== Monuments ===
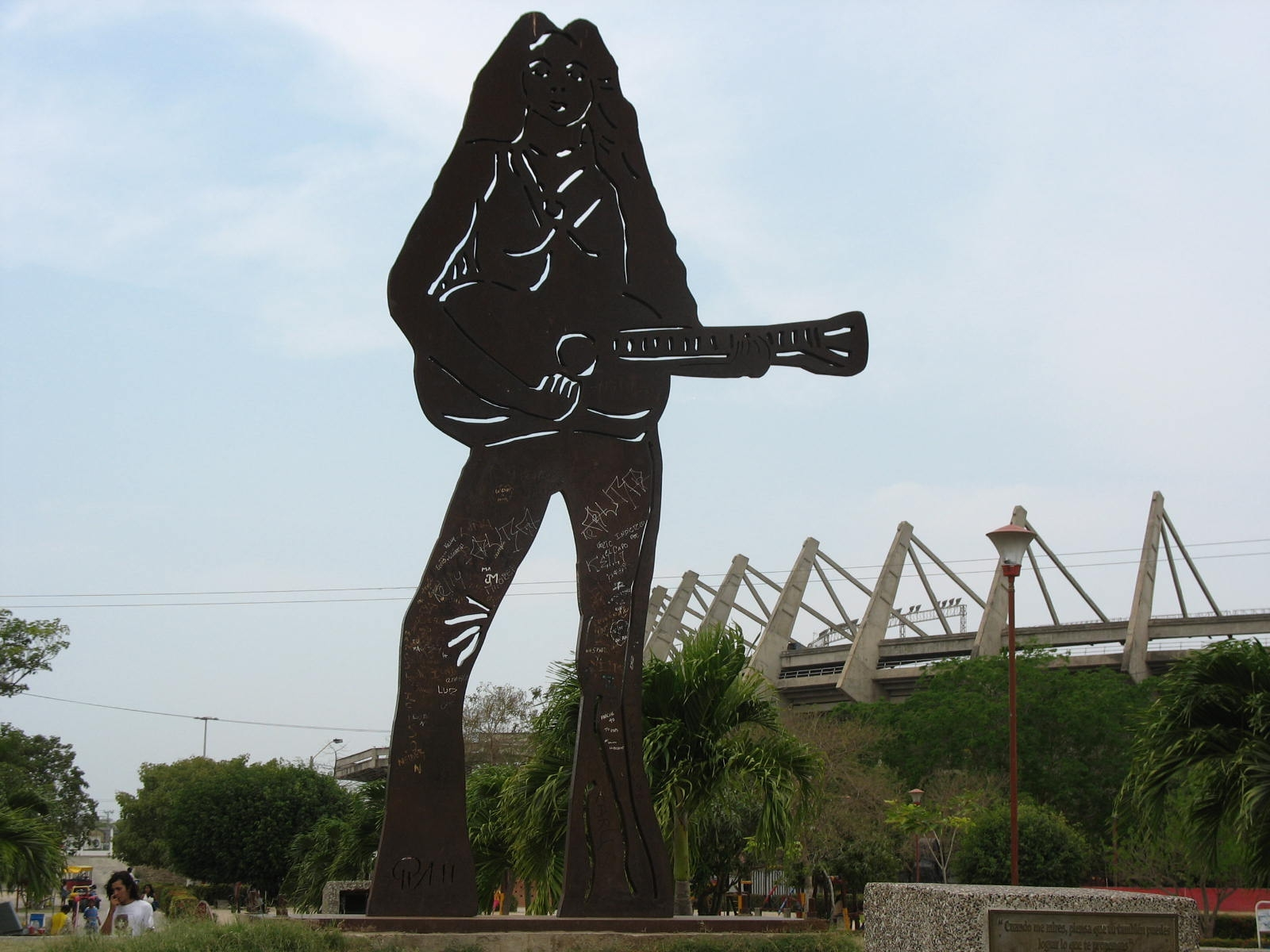
2006 sculpture of Shakira in Barranquilla

- In 2006, a six-tonne (6.6-short-ton), 5-metre-tall (16 ft) sculpture of Shakira was installed in her hometown Barranquilla in a park near Estadio Metropolitano Roberto Meléndez.
- In July 2018, Shakira visited Tannourine in Lebanon, the village of her paternal great-grandmother and father. Accompanied by officials, she went to the Tannourine Cedar Reserve, where two trees were dedicated to her and a square in the forest was named after her.
- In December 2023, Shakira's hometown of Barranquilla honored her with a 21-foot bronze statue. Creating the statue took five months of work by a team of over thirty people.

== Achievements ==
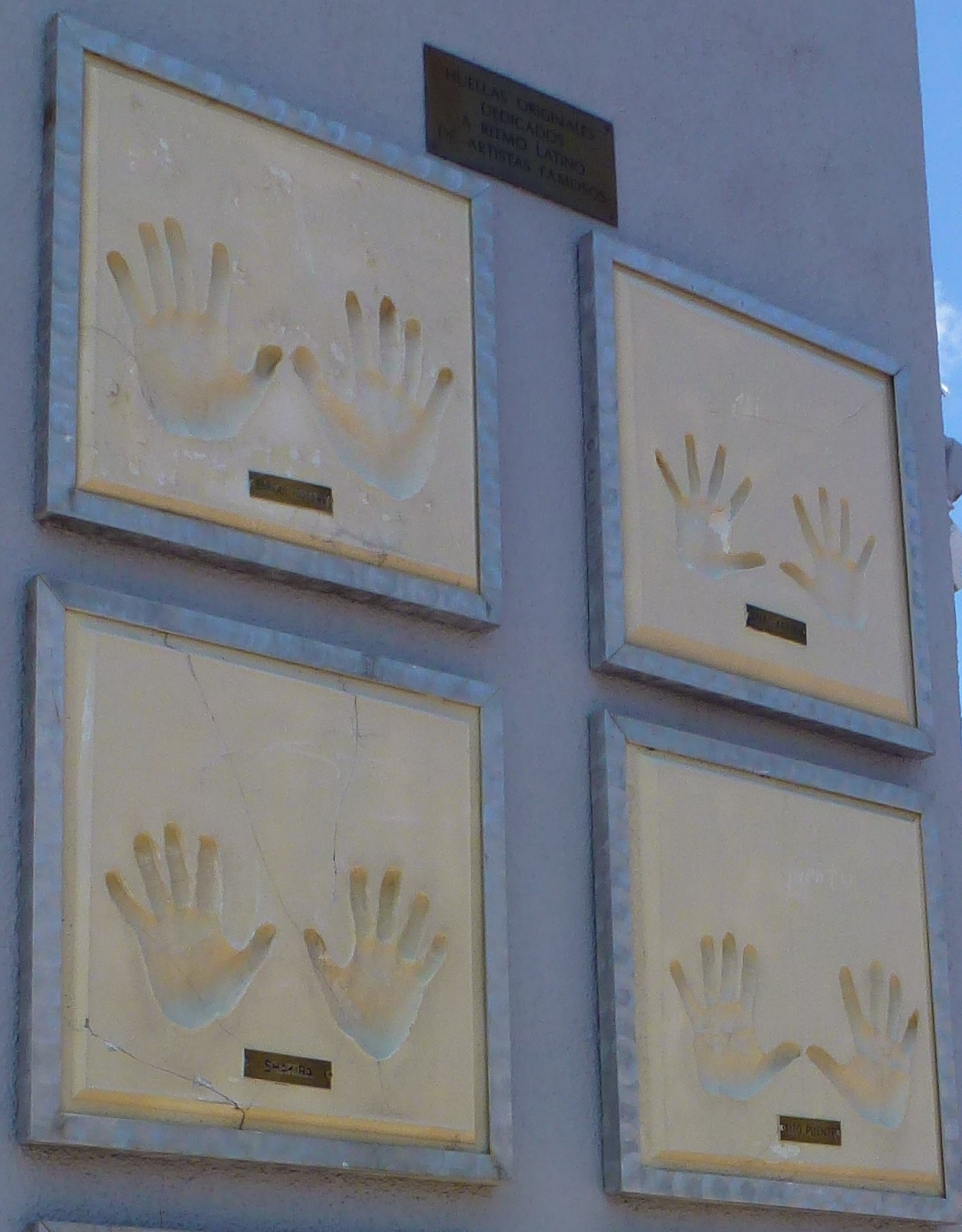
Shakira's handprints at San Fernando Mall's Ritmo Latino

Shakira has received numerous awards and recognition for her work. She is the recipient of four Grammy Awards and fifteen Latin Grammy Awards—the second most for a female artist. With over 95 million records sold by 2023, Shakira is one of the world's best-selling musicians. By the time she released Laundry Service in 2001, she had already sold 10 million albums in Latin America, according to Billboard. Three of her albums are among the best-selling Latin albums in the U.S.: Fijación Oral, Vol. 1 (8th), Dónde Están los Ladrones? (9th) and Pies Descalzos (23rd); she is the female artist with the highest number of best-selling Latin albums in the country. Fijación Oral, Vol. 1 had become the best-selling Latin pop album and the second best-selling Latin album overall of the 2000s decade in the U.S. Dónde Están los Ladrones? has also been one of the best-selling albums in Argentina, Chile, Colombia and Mexico. Pies Descalzos has been among the best-selling albums in Brazil and Colombia.

According to Nielsen Broadcast Data Systems, "Hips Don't Lie" was the most-played pop song in a single week in American radio history, being played 9,657 times in one week. The song made Shakira the first artist in the history of Billboard charts to reach number-one spots on both the Mainstream Top 40 and the Hot Latin Songs chart in the same week (27 June 2006). She became the only artist from South America with number-one spots on the U.S. Billboard Hot 100, the Australian ARIA Charts, and the UK singles chart. Shakira is the female artist with most top-ten hits on the Billboard's Hot Latin Songs chart (37). Her song "La Tortura" at one time held the chart's record for most weeks at number one, with the total of 25 non-consecutive weeks. She has also had most number-one songs on the Latin Digital Song Sales chart (18) and is the female artist with most number-one hits on the Latin Airplay chart (25). Nokia stated in 2010 that there were more Shakira music downloads in the prior year than of any other Latin artist; "She Wolf" was the top download. In December 2010, she was ranked number five on Billboard's "Online Video's Most Viral Artists of 2010" list, with 404,118,932 views.

In 2008, Shakira was named honorary chairperson of the Global Campaign for Education. In February 2011, at its Cultural Rhythms festival, the Harvard Foundation named Shakira Artist of the Year, awarding her its most prestigious medal. The foundation's director praised the nominee: "Her contributions to music and distinguished history of creativity have been applauded by people throughout the world, and she is greatly admired worldwide for her humanitarian efforts". The Harvard Gazette wrote of "Shakira's commitment to education and to the needs of those suffering around the world ... advanced through her humanitarian work".

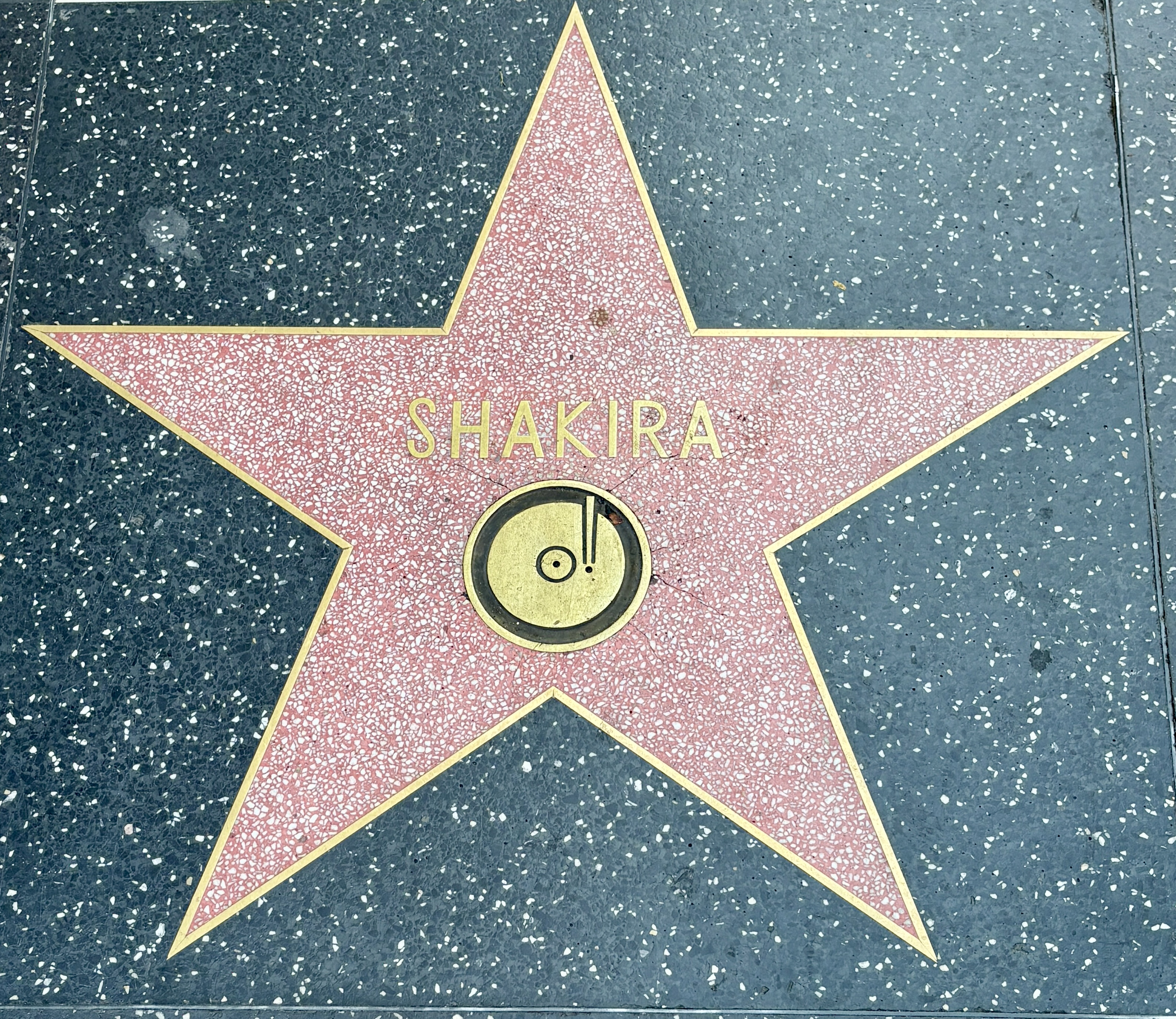
Hollywood Walk of Fame star

In November 2011, the Hollywood Chamber of Commerce honored Shakira with a star on the Hollywood Walk of Fame, in the Category of Recording. The announcement summarized her achievements as an artist and advocate for social causes, including her October 2011 nomination to the White House Education Commission. Also in November Shakira was declared, at the Latin Grammys, the Latin Recording Academy Person of the Year. In January 2012, she received the honor of Chevalier De L'Ordre des Arts et des Lettres from French minister of culture. The medal recognizes significant contributions to the arts and literature.

In 2014, Shakira became the first musical act to perform three times at the FIFA World Cup. Aleiodes shakirae, a newly-described species of parasitic wasp, was named after her because it causes its host (a caterpillar) to "shake and wiggle". Forbes ranked Shakira on its list of the "World's 100 Most Powerful Women" at number 40 in 2012, 52 in 2013, and 58 in 2014. In 2015, Time recognized Shakira as one of the most influential people on social media. Shakira and Argentine president Cristina Fernández de Kirchner were the only Latin influencers on Time's list. The magazine mentioned Shakira's "social capital", her having more Facebook fans than anybody else, and her "unparalleled platform" on social media, where she effectively promoted her work and philanthropy.

In 2018, Spotify listed Shakira as number 10 most-streamed female artist of the decade of the platform's existence; she had been the highest streamed Latin artist. In 2020, Shakira became the first female artist with four songs from different decades to have over 100 million streams on Spotify. She was the only artist with Spanish songs, the only Latin artist, and third overall, after Michael Jackson and Eminem, to achieve this milestone. In the same year, she broke the Vevo Certified Awards record, becoming the artist with the most videos with over 100 million views. By 2023, with over 20 billion cumulative views, she was one of the top-10 artists overall of all time on YouTube. In 2022, her financial worth was estimated at $300 million.

In 2019, Houston Press listed Shakira as one of the women who should have been introduced into the Rock and Roll Hall of Fame. In 2022, MTV (Latin America) included Shakira in the list of "the most influential women in the history of music", as the only Latina on the list. In May 2023, Billboard honored Shakira as the "Latin Woman of the Year", the first time the magazine bestowed this distinction. Billboard highlighted Shakira's record-breaking achievements of 2022 and 2023 and noted that she had been one of the best-selling musicians of all time. The magazine asserted that "With grace, a deep tradition of giving back, and enormous talent [she] continues to be more relevant than ever". According to Ronald Day of Telemundo, Shakira has "empowered generations to embrace our (Latin) identity through music". She was ranked at number 45 on Billboard's 2025 "Top 100 Women Artists of the 21st Century" list.

== Philanthropy, humanitarian work and politics ==
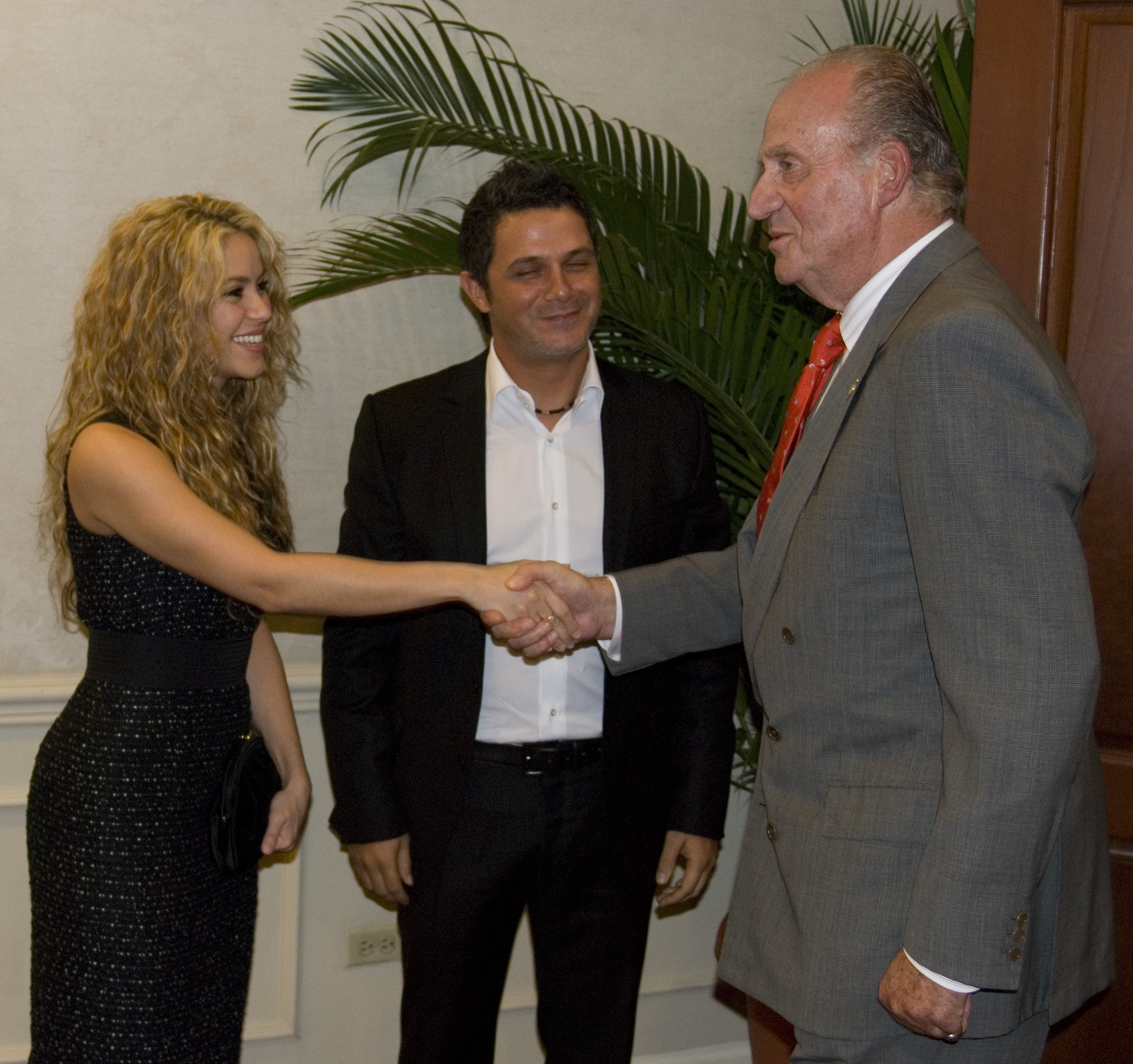
Shakira, Alejandro Sanz and King Juan Carlos I of Spain, during the 2008 Ibero-American Summit in El Salvador

In October 1997, Shakira founded Fundación Pies Descalzos (the Barefoot Foundation), a Colombian charity. Funded by her and others, the foundation builds and maintains special schools for underprivileged children in Colombia. The name of the foundation was taken from her third studio album, Pies Descalzos (1995). The foundation is focused on aid through education; its schools across Colombia provide teaching and meals for children. On 3 April 2006, Shakira was honored at a United Nations ceremony for establishing the foundation. Accepting the award, the singer said: "Let's not forget at the end of this day when we all go home, 960 children will have died in Latin America". The foundation also provides support and training for parents and communities. Shakira personally supervises the operation, visits the schools, interacts with the children and other people involved. As of 2026, the foundation's education programs had benefited more than 282,000 young people and more than 300 public schools across Colombia.

In 2003, Shakira became a UNICEF Goodwill Ambassador and a global representative of the UN children's agency. In December 2006, she became a founding member of Latin America in Solidarity Action (ALAS) Foundation, a coalition of artists and business leaders seeking to promote integrated early childhood public policies in Latin America and the Caribbean. She spoke of "a grand alliance, between the public sector and civil society, to protect the most fragile people in our population, the children". At the 2007 Clinton Global Initiative, Shakira secured a commitment of $40 million from the government of Spain for victims of natural disasters. In 2008, she served as honorary chair of the Global Campaign for Education. In the December 2008, People en Español declared Shakira the Humanitarian of the Year. In 2010, she collaborated with the World Bank and the Barefoot Foundation to establish an initiative to distribute developmental programs for children across Latin America.

In March 2010, Shakira was awarded by the UN International Labour Organization in recognition of being, as UN Labour Chief Juan Somavía put it, a "true ambassador for children and young people, for quality education and social justice". In November 2010, after performing as the opening act of the MTV European Music Awards, the Colombian singer received the MTV Free Your Mind award for her continuing efforts to facilitate access to education for children around the world.

In February 2011, the FC Barcelona Foundation and Pies Descalzos reached an agreement on children's education through sport. Shakira was the youngest artist ever honored at the Latin Grammy Awards as the Latin Recording Academy Person of the Year. At a tribute dinner and concert on 9 November 2011 in Las Vegas, she received recognition for her artistic and philanthropic contributions. In October 2011, she was appointed by President Obama to the President's Advisory Commission on Educational Excellence for Hispanics. On 26 April 2014, Shakira was honored with the Hero Award at the Radio Disney Music Awards for her work with the Pies Descalzos Foundation and a number of other charitable organizations.

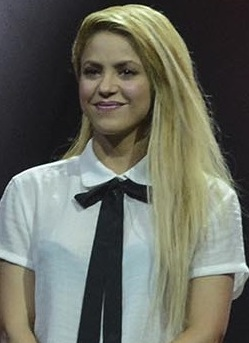
Shakira at a Global Citizen event in 2017

In July 2017, Shakira sang with Chris Martin at the Global Citizen Festival in Hamburg. The aims of the periodic event were to secure support for issues such as access to education, food security, and women's rights. She was among the personalities who joined the FIFA Global Citizen Education Fund's Advisory Board in October 2025. The fund was a result of Global Citizen's partnership with FIFA established in anticipation of the 2026 FIFA World Cup. Royalties from Shakira's World Cup single "Dai Dai" go to the FIFA Global Citizen Education Fund.

On 2 November 2018, during a visit to her birthplace Barranquilla concerning the construction of a school through her foundation, Shakira spoke about the educational policies of government of President Iván Duque of Colombia. She also talked about social inequality and the resulting absence of schooling for many children.

In April 2020, the World Literacy Foundation announced Shakira as the recipient of the 2020 Global Literacy Award for "her significant contribution to the improvement of literacy for disadvantaged children around the world". In May 2020, Shakira donated more than 50,000 face masks and ten respirators to combat the COVID-19 pandemic in her hometown of Barranquilla. In October 2020, she was appointed by Prince William, Duke of Cambridge a member of the Earthshot Prize Council, to decide on prizes ("environment Nobel") for five environmental pioneers per year, individuals or organizations, providing them with funds needed to further their work on problems impacting the environment. During the 2021 Colombian protests, Shakira condemned the violence and demanded from President Iván Duque to "immediately stop the human rights violations" and "restitute the value of human life above any political interest".

Shakira's wrote an op-ed commentary for Time magazine, published on 30 October 2020 under the title "Shakira: The Parents of 545 Children Are Missing, and the Silence Is Blaring". She strongly criticized the U.S. border control and immigration practices, asking "How ... could a nation built on the shoulders of immigrants ... have such unimaginably cruel immigration policies?" She asserted that "This is not about politics. There is simply no justification for the harm caused to these innocent children, and the people responsible for this cruel policy must be held accountable." On International Women's Day, 8 March 2021, Global Citizen wrote about "14 feminist heroes one should know and celebrate". Shakira was listed alongside a diverse group of well-known female personalities.

Following the 2026 Colombia earthquake on 10 August, Shakira raised an initial $1.25 million to fund the reconstruction of affected educational facilities. On 17 August she visited, with American philanthropist Howard Buffett, the capital city of Quibdó in the impoverished and heavily-damaged by quake Chocó Department. She toured the destroyed and damaged schools and pledged their rebuilding, including the provincial Technological University of Chocó, as well as construction of ten new schools.

== Other ventures ==
Shakira has engaged in different businesses and pursuits. She and the fragrance company Puig launched S by Shakira, her first beauty product and the first of Shakira Perfumes line, in 2010. Among the first perfumes released were S by Shakira and S by Shakira Eau Florale, along with lotions and body sprays. As of 2019, 30 fragrances had been released, not counting deluxe editions. On 17 September 2015, Shakira was featured as a playable bird in the game Angry Birds POP! for a limited time, and then in a special tournament in the game Angry Birds Friends. On 15 October 2015, Love Rocks Starring Shakira, a video game that featured her, was launched.

On 14 August 2015, at Disney's D23 Expo, it was announced that Shakira would play a character in the Disney animated movie Zootopia. She would give voice to Gazelle, the biggest pop star in Zootopia. Shakira also recorded a song for the film, titled "Try Everything", written and composed by Sia and Stargate and released in January 2016. The movie, premiered in February 2016, brought a record-breaking box office success in several countries and earned a worldwide gross of over $1 billion, making it the fourth highest-grossing film of 2016 and the 43rd highest-grossing film of all time. On 8 November 2024, Shakira announced that she would return as Gazelle for Zootopia 2; she was going to reprise her voice role and compose a new song for the film. The song, titled "Zoo", written by Shakira, Ed Sheeran and Blake Slatkin, became available on 10 October 2025 and the film premiered in November. Her sons provided voices for little bunnies in Zootopia 2. Zootopia 2 became Disney's highest-grossing animated movie ever, earning over $1.7 billion worldwide by early 2026; the "Zoo" track had over 500 million streams on all platforms. The song was nominated for the 2026 Nickelodeon Kids' Choice Awards for Favorite Song from a Movie.

On 21 September 2021, Shakira released the La Caldera NFT collection, which features four audiovisual pieces. The proceeds from the collection supported Shakira's Pies Descalzos Foundation. In December 2021, she was announced to be an executive producer for Dancing with Myself, an NBC dance competition series. The program aired in 2022. In October 2023, Epson announced a partnership with the "global icon Shakira ... a cultural influencer and change trailblazer". She became the company's brand ambassador for Epson Latin America. According to Keith Kratzberg, president and CEO at Epson America, "Shakira is an icon of creativity with unsurpassed passion for the people of Latin America". Epson stressed "the Colombian singer and songwriter's commitment to improving access to education for children in underprivileged communities". The partnership was envisaged to be a multi-year effort "across several communication channels and social media".

To uplift women through the power of music and "empower her sisters this International Women's Day (8 March) and beyond", Shakira joined forces with Hard Rock International and they announced together on 27 February 2025 a year-long partnership. She also spoke of "breaking barriers and making the world a more inclusive space where every woman feels confident being themselves". The Hard Rock Heals Foundation declared donating $250,000 to Pies Descalzos Foundation. In June 2025, Shakira announced the launching of her new hair-care beauty line, Isima. Changing hairstyles and colors have been prominent in the singer's performances and Isima was "designed with the diversity and specificity of Latina hair in mind". Shakira was actively promoting her first venture into the hair-care area on her social media platforms. As of 1 July 2025, Epson announced a new partnership with the "international music icon" Shakira, who became the brand's official ambassador for the META-CWA region (Middle East, Turkey, Africa, Central and West Asia). The partnership with Shakira was to be a part of the company's Imagine New Possibilities campaign.

== Personal life ==
In 2009, Scott Malcomson wrote in The New York Times Magazine article that Shakira's life was "relentless and unlikely". Her "normal manner is intense and preoccupied, with interruptions of bright enthusiasm". Her work ethics he called "somewhat extreme". (As Shakira told her Boston Herald interviewer in 2026, she keeps herself disciplined with rehearsals, "doesn't sleep much", but catches some sleep "whenever she can get it".) With fans, "she is all attentive patience". Malcomson commented on the subject of Shakira's "feminine allure", the factor that was "at once limiting and critical to her power". He mentioned the economist Jeffrey Sachs bringing the matter up in a speech at Columbia University. Malcomson listed some of the ways in which Shakira had dealt with and reacted to the issue of her attractiveness, in real life and in artistic creations: pleasant carelessness, rage and hunger, sheer athletic joy, easygoing self-confident lust, physical insecurity (the weight control pressure), and "an acute sense of the physical and mental pain of attraction".

Shakira expressed her thoughts on the reasons why she had worked so hard and for so many years on her professional development and career, what had been her "motivation to continue". In 2009 she told the interviewer about wanting, in her early years, to bring her parents joy, "to fill the void in their own lives" (because of the hard times the family had gone through). "Then, later, I wanted to make my own people proud, my home town, my country, this country that has gone through so many difficulties." She wanted to "make a difference". Eventually, she came to realize that she herself also mattered and her motivations did not have to be all external. "And now it's all for me", she said, "I guess that's why I'm still working, because this time I get to do it for me!"

Between 2007 and 2009, Shakira studied the history of Western Civilization at UCLA. In 2020, she announced her completion of an ancient philosophy course through the University of Pennsylvania, describing it as an impractical hobby of hers.

=== Relationships ===
In December 2024, Puerto Rican actor Osvaldo Ríos spoke of his past relationship with Shakira, which started when she was 20 and he was 36 (1997) and lasted nearly a year. He told of an "emotional and spiritual connection" between them and said that Shakira was very devoted to the Virgin Mary. They traveled together, often accompanied, "due to her family's traditional Lebanese roots", by Shakira's brother Tonino. Among the places they visited were Paris, Brazil and Puerto Rico. Although they wanted to get married, their respective careers eventually pulled them apart, as Ríos realized that "this bird had to fly very high" and encouraged Shakira to pursue her professional path without limitations. He named "Moscas en la Casa", "No Creo" and "Tú" as songs inspired by their romantic bond and by their love letters in particular.

Shakira began a relationship with Argentine lawyer Antonio de la Rúa in 2000. Antonio is a son of Fernando de la Rúa, who was president of Argentina from 1999 to 2001. In a 2009 interview, Shakira said, "The fact is, I'm not very traditionalist. We live together as husband and wife, we don't need anything to make it official. ... Why fix things that aren't broken?" They had been "engaged" from 2001, but the marriage had never materialized. Shakira kept saying, almost until the end, that she desired and expected a permanent union and family with de la Rúa. For a number of years, de la Rúa had managed Shakira's business and career.

On 10 January 2011, a statement bearing the names "Shakira and Antonio" in the signature field was published on shakira.com. "Since August 2010, we made a mutual decision to take time apart from our romantic relationship ... we view this period of separation as temporary ... as we continue to be partners in our business and professional lives ... Antonio continues to oversee and conduct my business and career interests as he has always done", she wrote. De la Rúa's civil litigation against Shakira was first reported in September 2012. He filed a suit against her in California in April 2013, asking for $100 million he claimed he was owed after she terminated her business partnership with him and his services in October 2011. His lawsuit was dismissed by a Los Angeles County Superior Court judge in August 2013. Two other lawsuits that de la Rúa filed against his former partner were also unsuccessful. Shakira also sued and a legal settlement of some sort may have been reached. Shakira's relationship with Antonio de la Rúa contributed to the existence of "Underneath Your Clothes", "Whenever, Wherever", "Día de Enero", and on its breakup, "Lo Que Más".

Shakira and Spanish football player Gerard Piqué first met in June 2010 when shooting the music video for Shakira's song "Waka Waka (This Time for Africa)", the official song of the 2010 FIFA World Cup. A relationship ensued, for some time not revealed, and the couple took residence in Barcelona. Shakira gave birth to their first son, Milan, on 22 January 2013. She gave birth to their second son, Sasha, on 29 January 2015. According to Shakira, she learned about Piqué's "betrayal" of her (an affair with another woman) from media accounts. It happened in May 2022, at a difficult time for her, when her then 91-year-old father was undergoing hospitalization following a bad fall he had suffered. Twelve years after they met, in June 2022, Shakira and Piqué announced in a joint statement that they were separating.

=== Tax controversy ===
In November 2017, Shakira was named in the Paradise Papers. It was disclosed that she was the sole shareholder of a Malta-based company used to transfer more than $30 million in music rights. Her legal representatives maintained that her use of the company was entirely lawful. Also in 2017, an investigation into Shakira's taxes was announced by the Spanish authorities. The prosecutors alleged that she failed to pay taxes in Spain between 2012 and 2014, a period during which she resided in Barcelona with Gerard Piqué. Shakira contended that her primary residence remained in the Bahamas during that time, that she was also engaged in international touring and was not legally a resident of Spain because of not having lived there for more than six months per year. In July 2021, a Spanish judge determined that there was "evidence of criminality" sufficient to bring her to trial on charges of tax fraud.

In 2021, the Pandora Papers revealed that Shakira submitted applications for three offshore companies in 2019. Her representatives told LaSexta that these applications were not intended to establish new companies but were part of the process of dissolving existing ones. They asserted that the companies had no income or activities and that Spanish authorities had been informed of their existence. Most of the artist's income had been generated outside of Spain.

Negotiations with the Spanish Prosecution Ministry took place, but in July 2022 Shakira refused the settlement offered (its terms were not disclosed), opting to go to trial to prove her innocence. Prosecutors requested an eight-year prison sentence and a €23.8 million fine for the alleged tax fraud offenses. The singer declared "a total violation of her rights". On 27 September 2022, a Spanish judge in Esplugues de Llobregat approved the tax fraud trial after prosecutors accused Shakira of failing to pay €14.5 million ($13.9 million) in taxes. She claimed she had already paid all owed amounts plus €3 million ($2.8 million) as interest. The Barcelona judge, Ana Duro, said the trial date would be set after she receives the necessary qualifying papers from both parties.

On 20 November 2023, at the commencement of the trial, a deal with prosecutors was finally reached and Shakira settled the case by paying a €7.5 million fine. In a statement, she cited her well-being and the interest of her children as factors influencing her decision. In May 2026, the Spanish National Court acquitted Shakira in a 2011 tax fraud case and ordered the government to return the over €60 million in fines and interest in relation to fines that were wrongly imposed in 2021.

== Discography ==
- Magia (1991)
- Peligro (1993)
- Pies Descalzos (1995)
- Dónde Están los Ladrones? (1998)
- Laundry Service (2001)
- Fijación Oral, Vol. 1 (2005)
- Oral Fixation, Vol. 2 (2005)
- She Wolf (2009)
- Sale el Sol (2010)
- Shakira (2014)
- El Dorado (2017)
- Las Mujeres Ya No Lloran (2024)

== Tours ==
- Tour Pies Descalzos (1995–1997)
- Tour Anfibio (2000)
- Tour of the Mongoose (2002–2003)
- Oral Fixation Tour (2006–2007)
- The Sun Comes Out World Tour (2010–2011)
- El Dorado World Tour (2018)
- Las Mujeres Ya No Lloran World Tour (2025–2027)

== Filmography ==
=== Television ===
Year	Title	Role	Notes
1994	El oasis	Luisa Maria Rico	
2002	Popstars Brazil	Mentor assistant	Season 1
2002	Taina	Herself	Episode: "Abuelo Knows Best"
2005	7 vidas	Herself	Episode: "Todo por las pastis"
2009	Ugly Betty	Herself	Episode: "The Bahamas Triangle"
2010	Wizards of Waverly Place	Herself	Episode: "Dude Looks Like Shakira"
2011	Dora and Friends: Into the City	Herself	Episode: "Dora's Explorer Girls: Our First Concert"
2013–2014	The Voice	Coach/Mentor	Seasons 4 and 6
2014	Dreamland	Herself	Episode: "3"
2020	Global Goal: Unite for Our Future	Herself	Television special
2020	The Disney Family Singalong: Volume II	Herself	Television special
2022	Dancing With Myself	Herself	TV Show
2022	Zootopia+	Gazelle (voice)	Episode: "So You Think You Can Prance"

=== Film ===
Year	Title	Role	Notes
2002	Shakira: The Documentary Film	Herself	Documentary
2007	Pies Descalzos Foundation	Herself	Documentary
2011	Hagamos que Salga El Sol	Herself	Documentary
2011	A Day with Shakira	Herself	Documentary
2016	Zootopia	Gazelle	Voice role
2020	Miss Americana	Herself	Documentary
2022	Jennifer Lopez: Halftime	Herself	Documentary
2025	Zootopia 2	Gazelle	Voice role

== See also ==
- List of artists who reached number one in the United States
- List of artists who reached number one on the U.S. Dance Club Songs chart
- List of barefooters
- Best-selling international artists in Brazil
- List of best-selling Latin music artists
- List of best-selling music artists
- List of Billboard Social 50 number-one artists
- Women in Latin music
- List of Colombians
- List of highest-certified music artists in Germany
- List of largest music deals
- List of most-subscribed YouTube channels
