= Magia (Shakira album) =

Studio album by Shakira
- Released: 24 June 1991
- Recorded: 1990–1991
- Studios: Aga Studios (Bogotá, Colombia)
- Genres: Latin pop; pop rock
- Length: 32:47
- Language: Spanish
- Label: Sony Colombia
- Producers: Gabriel Muñoz; Miguel E. Cubillos; Pablo Tedeschi

Shakira chronology
Magia (1991)	Peligro (1993)

Singles from Magia
- 1. "Magia" Released: 21 December 1990; 2. "Lejos de Tu Amor" Released: 3 April 1991; 3. "Esta Noche Voy Contigo" Released: 16 July 1991; 4. "Sueños" Released: 28 September 1991

Magia (English: Magic, Spanish pronunciation: [ma.xja]) is the debut studio album by Colombian singer-songwriter Shakira. It was released on 24 June 1991, through Sony Music Colombia, with whom she signed a three-album recording contract. The record is a collection of pop ballads, many of which Shakira wrote since she was eight years old, with themes inspired by the experience of hanging out with boys, adventure stories, and dreams of living on the coast.

The album's live performances helped Shakira receive attention in Colombian media. However, it was not a commercial success, with sales estimated at between 1,000 and 1,200 copies. At Shakira's request, Magia and its follow-up Peligro (1993) were removed from music markets. "Magia" was released as a promotional single in 1991.

== Development and composition ==
Born in Barranquilla, Colombia, Shakira began writing songs at the age of eight years, her first one being "Tus Gafas Oscuras". Her performances at local competitions led to a meeting with local theater producer Monica Ariza, who arranged for an audition for her in Bogotá. She performed three songs for executives of Sony Music Colombia, who were impressed enough to sign her, at the age of 13, to record three albums, which turned out to be Magia, Peligro (1993), and Pies Descalzos (1995).

The low-budget Magia was put into almost three months of pre-production, which involved choreography of live performances for the album, singing lessons for Shakira, and arranging the songs. The concept of the music still reflected her personality, despite the fact that it was managed by the record label. The tracks deal with emotions of a person's first time falling in love, and range from a love poem ("Sueños") to a celebration of dance ("Esta Noche Voy Contigo"). These were influenced by experiences with males such as her ex-boyfriend Oscar Pardo, stories told by her father, and dreams of living on the coast. In the book Shakira: Woman Full of Grace, Ximena Diego wrote that the album "demonstrated her [Shakira's] indisputable potential".

Magia is a collection of 8 songs plus a remix, 5 of which were written by Shakira between the ages of 8 and 13. The album mainly consists of pop ballads. It was produced by Miguel E. Cubillos and Pablo Tedeschi, and recorded at Aga Studios in Bogotá, when Shakira was 13–14. A Sony Music Colombia representative said that the recording process was simple and went perfectly fine; however, for Shakira, the process was problematic, as she had no ability to decide which tracks would be included and no input into the rhythmic structure or artistic production of the songs.

== Release and promotion ==
To promote the launch of the album, as a suggestion from Shakira, live performances were held in locations such as Teatro Amira de la Rosa, Cartagena, Santa Marta, Riohacha, Medellín, Cali, Bogotá, and other various theaters and events, all of which received print, radio and television coverage. The performances featured additional dancers and background vocalists such as César Navarro, Guillermo Gómez, Mauricio Pinilla, and Richard Ricardo. A music video was done for "Magia", which Navarro also starred in. Navarro found working with Shakira enjoyable and relaxing, and recalled her as sensitive and energetic: "She was a tireless worker, but more than anything, she was a total blast". The choreography for the performances was done by Gary Julio and Ray Silva. The album won an award at the Viña del Mar International Song Festival in 1991, although Shakira was not able to attend the ceremony as she was less than 16. The record did not fare well commercially; between 1,000 and 1,200 copies were sold in her home country. In 2003, Shakira refused to allow the re-release of both Magia and her next album, Peligro, because of their "immaturity".

== Track listing ==
No.	Title	Writer(s)	Length
1.	"Sueños"	Shakira	3:47
2.	"Esta Noche Voy Contigo"	Miguel Enrique Cubillos	3:53
3.	"Lejos de Tu Amor"	Pablo Tedeschi	3:09
4.	"Magia"	Shakira	4:43
5.	"Cuentas Conmigo"	Juanita Loboguerrero; Cubillos	4:01
6.	"Cazador de Amor"	Shakira	3:07
7.	"Gafas Oscuras"	Shakira	3:13
8.	"Necesito de Ti"	Shakira	3:41
9.	"Lejos de Tu Amor" (Versión Remix)	Tedeschi	3:13

== Credits and personnel ==
Credits are adapted from the album's liner notes.

- Shakira – songwriter, vocals, guitar
- Sergio Solano – acoustic and electric guitars
- Antonio "Toño" Arnedo – saxophone
- Miguel Enrique Cubillos – producer, songwriter, music direction, artistic arrangement, vocal direction, chorus
- Ana Maria Gónzalez-Liliana Avila – chorus
- Juanita Loboguerrero – songwriter
- Pablo Tedeschi – producer, songwriter, musical direction, arrangement, computer programming, synthesizer programming, drum programming
- Alvaro Eduardo Ortiz Q – design
- Gabriel Muñoz – producer, general coordination
- Luis Miguel Olivar – sound engineer, mixing engineer
- Leo Erazzo – album artwork
