= Sculpture of Shakira =

Sculpture in Barranquilla, Colombia

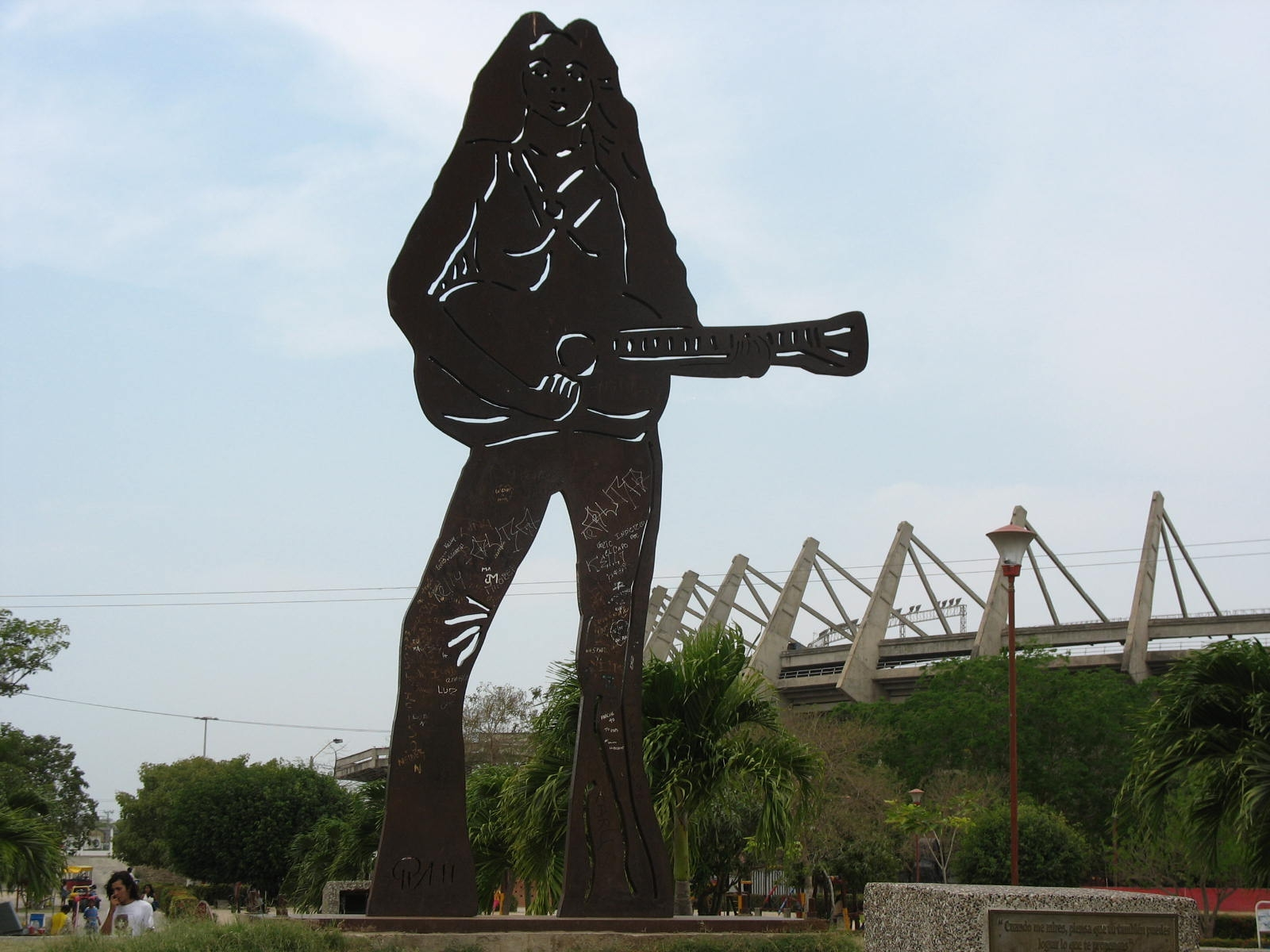
- Artist: Dieter Patt
- Year: 2006
- Completion date: 2006-11-05
- Dimensions: 5 m (16 ft)
- Location: Barranquilla, Colombia; 10.924580°N 74.800510°W

The sculpture of Shakira is a monument of Colombian singer Shakira that is located outside the Roberto Meléndez Metropolitan Stadium, in Barranquilla, Colombia.

== Features ==
The sculpture made of steel measures 5 meters high and represents the Barranquilla artist Shakira standing with a guitar. The monument stands for the artist's successful career and the "musical triumphs she has given to the country." It is located just outside the Estadio Metropolitano Roberto Meléndez.

== 2023 statue ==
Since December 26, 2023, a second Shakira statue has been displayed in Barranquilla on a promenade along the Magdalena River.
