= Statue of Shakira =

Sculpture in Barranquilla, Colombia

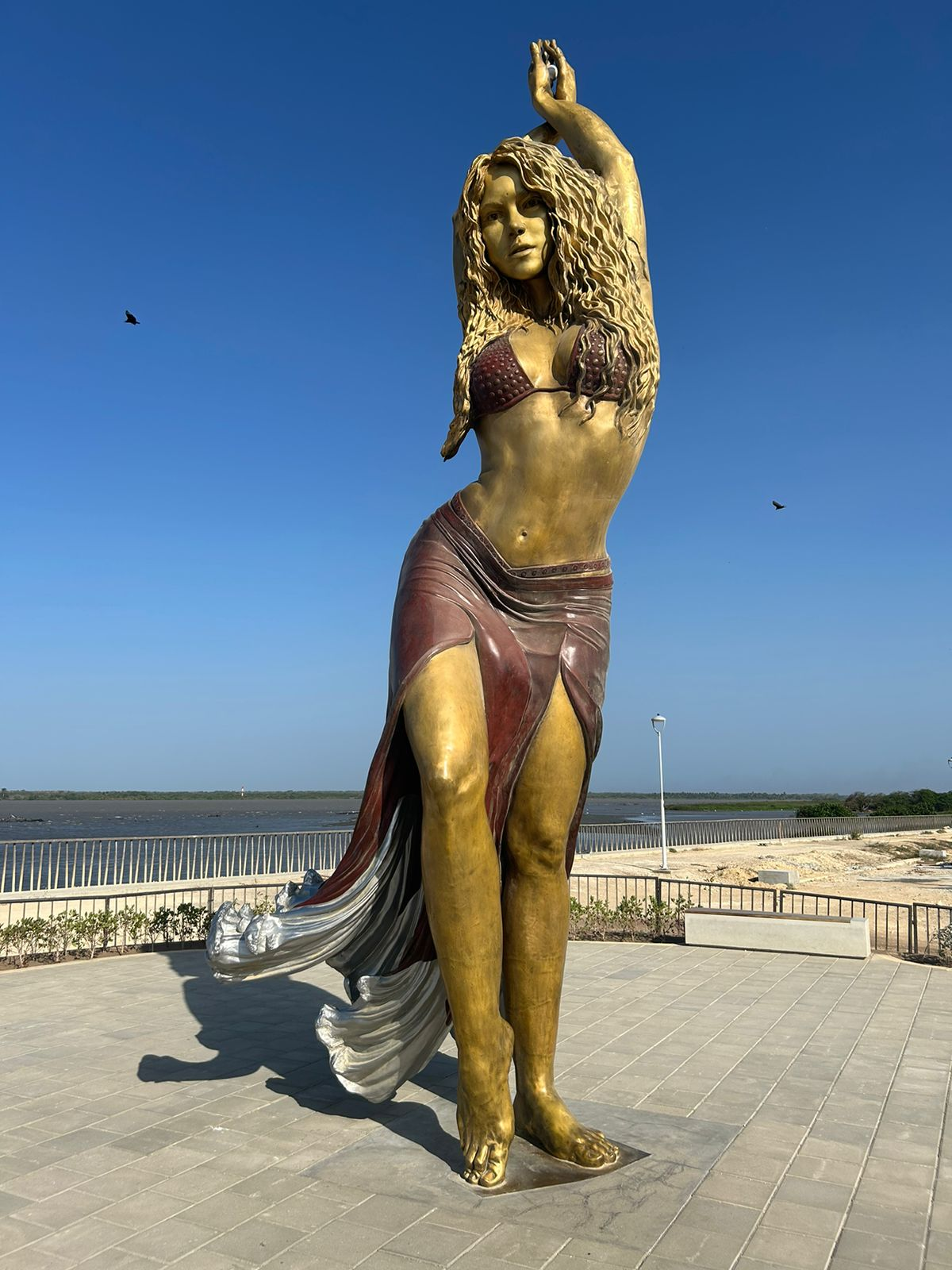
- Artist: Yino Marquez
- Year: 2023
- Completion date: December 2023
- Dimensions: 6.5 m (21 ft)
- Location: Barranquilla, Colombia; 11.010011°N 74.782075°W

The bronze statue of Colombian singer Shakira stands at the Gran Malecon de Barranquilla, in Barranquilla, Colombia.

This bronze statue is the second biggest pop icon statue only behind Forever Marilyn, a 26-ft tribute to Marilyn Monroe in Palm Springs, California.

== Sculpture ==
The statue, which resembles Shakira's signature pose and hip swivel from her 2005 "Hips Don't Lie" music video, was sculpted by 52-year-old sculptor Yino Marquez. Marquez, with a career spanning from the age of 16, has crafted large statues for Colombian cities and serves as an academic coordinator in Barranquilla’s public art academy. Mayor Jaime Pumarejo proposed the idea of a Shakira statue for the waterfront, and a month later, Marquez was chosen. The city aimed to honor Barranquilla figures to boost tourism and provide role models, resulting in two statues—one representing the city's coat of arms and another of Shakira. The project cost around 700 million Colombian pesos (USD$180,000). Over 30 people worked on the sculpture over the course of five months.

A plaque beneath the statue reads: "A heart that composes, hips that don't lie, unmatched talent, a voice that moves the masses, and bare feet that march for the good of children and humanity." The sculpture is located on a promenade along the Magdalena River.

== Reception ==
Shakira expressed in a social media post about the statue dedication, "This is too much for my little heart." She shared her happiness at having her parents present on her mother's birthday during the ceremony and extended gratitude to the statue's sculptor and the students from a local arts school. She has not seen it yet in person according to her interview with Zane Lowe on Apple Music.

== Sculpture of Shakira in Barranquilla ==
This is the second monumental sculpture of the Colombian artist located in Barranquilla. Since 2006, a no less representative one has been displayed in the park of the Estadio Metropolitano Roberto Meléndez, the largest stadium in Colombia. The Shakira sculpture made of steel represents the singer and songwriter standing with a guitar.
