= Gafas Oscuras =

Song by Shakira

from the album Magia
- Written: 1985–1987
- Released: 24 June 1991
- Recorded: 1991
- Studio: Aga Studios (Bogotá, Colombia)
- Genre: Latin pop
- Length: 3:13
- Label: Sony Colombia
- Songwriter: Shakira

"Gafas Oscuras" (English: Dark Glasses), or "Tus Gafas Oscuras", is the first song written by Colombian singer-songwriter Shakira. Written between 1985 and 1987, it was released as the seventh track on Shakira's debut album Magia in 1991. Lyrically, the song speaks about her father's grief after the death of her older brother in 1979.

== Background and composition ==
Shakira started writing poems at the age of four, when she wrote her first one titled "La Rosa de Cristal". When she was seven years old, she received a typewriter for Christmas, and wrote poems with it, that would become song lyrics.

When Shakira was two years old, her older brother William died at the age of 19 in a motorcycle accident. His death left their father William Mebarak in deep sorrow, a grief Shakira endured throughout several years of her childhood. This inspired her to write the song "Gafas Oscuras", which talks about how overwhelmed she feels about her father keeping his pain hidden: "Tus gafas oscuras intrigantes, misteriosas a cualquier uno impacta. Y cuando me miras, me quitas la vista y me robas el alma." ('Your dark glasses, intriguing, mysterious, shock everyone. And when you look at me, you take away my sight and steal my soul.'). The song is the only one on the album that is not a love song.

It was revealed by William in the documentary of Shakira's live album Live & off the Record that he would always wear dark sunglasses "to hide the pain behind a pair of glasses, and (Shakira) made a connection with that." The song was written by Shakira when she was eight or nine years old, and recorded and released in 1991 as the seventh track on Shakira's debut album Magia when she was 14. "Gafas Oscuras" is available only from old physical copies of the album. Shakira blocked the re-release of her first two albums citing their "immaturity".

== Reception ==
Noelia Bertol from Cadena Dial described how "Gafas Oscuras" is "a song in which we can appreciate the maturity with which the artist, even as a child, was able to compose about what love does to us. The editorial team of Vanguardia called the song "one of the most moving songs in her repertoire."

== Live performances ==
Shakira performed "Gafas Oscuras" along with other original compositions at many events and singing contests. During one such occasion, she attracted the interest of theater producer Mónica Ariza, who then arranged for her to audition in front of executives from Sony Music Colombia. The audition was successful, leading to Shakira securing a recording contract to produce her first three albums.
