= Scott Malcomson =

American author and editor

Scott L. Malcomson (born 1961) is an author, former reporter, former U.S. government official, research fellow, and consultant in the United States. He was a foreign editor for the New York Times Magazine from 2004 until 2011 and has written for publications including Foreign Affairs, The New York Times, The New Yorker, The Guardian, and The World Post. He has worked for Non-Governmental Organizations (NGOs) and was a senior official at the United Nations and U.S. State Department. Malcomson was a fellow in New America's International Security program and at the Carnegie Corporation of New York. He reported and writes about issues such as globalism based on his experiences and work on six continents.

== Background ==
Malcomson was born in California in 1961. He grew up in Oakland and graduated from University of California, Berkeley, where he wrote for and edited at The Daily Californian. Malcomson moved to New York City in the 1980s and wrote for publications including The Village Voice, The New Yorker and The New York Times. He has also written for The London Review of Books, The New Republic, Transition, Lettre Internationale, Film Quarterly, Daily Beast, Artforum, Huffington Post, Colors and The Nation. He worked for the Berggruen Institute in 2012 and was director of communications for International Crisis Group from 2013 until 2015. He taught journalism and entrepreneurism at New York University. He has an M.A. in international relations from the Fletcher School of Law and Diplomacy and a Ph.D. in history from the University of Cambridge.

He is a member of the Council on Foreign Relations and PEN.

== Bibliography ==
- Tuturani: A Political Journey in the Pacific Islands (1990)
- Empire’s Edge: Travels in South-eastern Europe, Turkey and Central Asia (1994)
- One Drop of Blood: The American Misadventure of Race (2000)
- Generation’s End: A Personal Memoir of American Political Power after 9/11 (2010)
- Splinternet: How Geopolitics and Commerce Are Fragmenting the World Wide Web (2016)
- Appiah, Kwame Anthony & Lionel Barber (Winter 2019). "The unity in disunity : looking at the world of globalization". Carnegie Conversation. Carnegie Reporter. 11 (1). Moderated by Scott Malcomson: 8–15.
