= Analysis of Shakira's musical work =

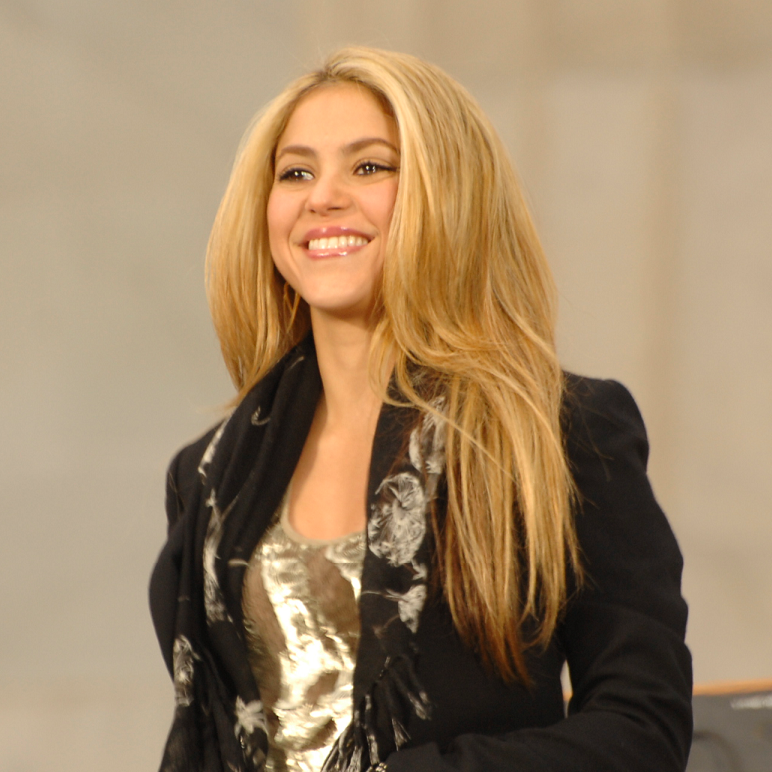
Shakira has been analyzed during the years.

The musical works of Colombian singer Shakira have drawn the attention of music critics, and journalists. Shakira's songs from her first two international albums are the most analyzed due to their symbology, lyrics and concept of that time. Several of these analyzes have helped to understand more about the ideals of the singer, her political views, and religious position, as well as her inspirations for her first videos and songs. Likewise, the analysis of these works are used for works in various universities and colleges.

Several musical and cultural magazines have emphasized her cultural inspiration, her Lebanese descent, as well as being a Latin woman creating a "unique" sound and style, during her albums "Pies Descalzos" and "Dónde Están los Ladrones?". Many critics highlighted her influence of various philosophers of history, becoming named in her songs. She has also touched on social criticism issues, such as being censored on the radio at the time during her earlier career. Shakira is the Latin artist with the best vocabulary in lyrics of all time and the fourth overall according to a study carried out on different stars of popular music by the organization "Cliqpod" with an average of 151 unique words per 1,000 words.

Shakira has been honored with various awards for her musical compositions and skill in various genres. Among them, various ASCAP, Billboard or BMI awards. She has also received the most important music awards in their respective regions: World Music Awards (world region), Grammy (United States), NRJ (France), Echo (Germany) or the Oye! (Mexico) to name a few examples. During the year 2012 she was awarded as a member of Letters by the "Ordre des Arts et des Lettres" whose function is the recognition of significant contributions to the arts, literature, or the propagation of these fields. Also in the year 2022 Shakira was honored with an Ivor Novello award due to her work as a composer highlighting her ability to translate her songs into other languages without losing their initial essence. In 2012, VH1 named Shakira "The Greatest Latin Woman in Music".

== Cultural Context ==
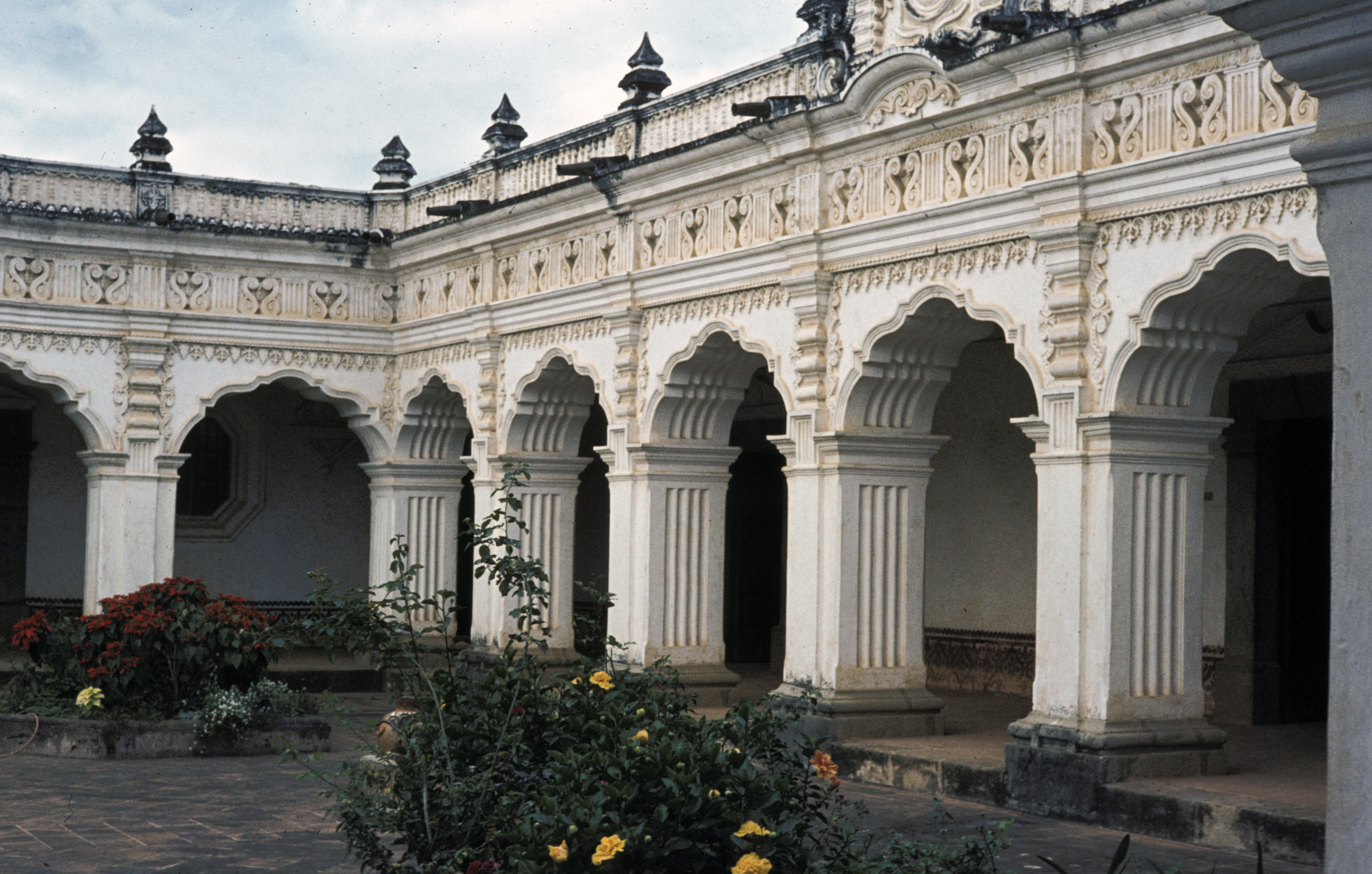
At the University of San Carlos Guatemala, several graduates in communication sciences carried out an analysis of Shakira's lyrics..

From the beginning of her career in the 90's, Shakira's discography was a subject analyzed among music critics from both Latin America and the United States. Her fusion of musical styles spanning across multiple cultures was an integral part of her artistic identity, and audiences viewed her as a genuine woman who sought to inspire and uplift others through her music. She has helped to shape the genre of modern Latin pop through the fusion of rhythms by her Lebanese descent and her unique songwriting, which helped to differentiate and distinguish herself from other Latin pop artists, expressing that Shakira had a personal stamp. In many universities, research work has been carried out on an analysis of Shakira's music, whether it be lyrics or sounds. The academic book "Musical imagiNation: U.S. "Colombian identity and the Latin music boom" explores the artistic work of various celebrities, especially the Colombian singer Shakira. Several magazines, especially "Cultures", make a greater analysis of Shakira's multiculturalism and how this has impacted several countries around the world, exposing her fans to listen to sounds from different countries. The newspaper "The New York Times" expressed that "If her songs had not become international pop hits, Shakira would have been praised as an innovator in alternative Latin rock" calling her work "The Shakira Dialectic".

== Evolution and musical style ==
Shakira is a Colombian singer-songwriter who debuted in 1991. She is a pop, pop rock and Latin pop singer with a "contralto" voice range, and is fully involved in the production and composition of her albums. Her discography covers different musical genres from ballads, bachata, bolero, pop, rock, merengue, tango, ranchero among several others. While the lyrical content of these albums touch on various themes, they are mostly directed towards love and heartbreak. She began at age 4 making her first poem entitled "Tus Gafas Oscuras" dedicated to her father. Her first album consisted of several poems that she had written up to that point in time. Later in her career, Shakira has sung in different languages such as English, Spanish, French, Portuguese, Arabic and German. She has composed songs for international audiences including the World Cup, and movie soundtracks such as Zootopia and Zootopia 2.

=== Decade of 1990 ===
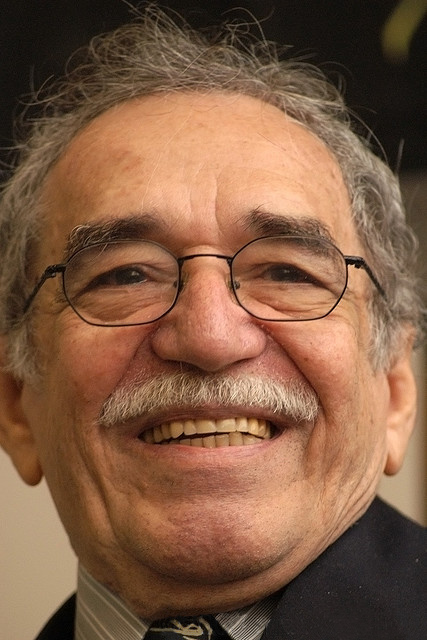
Gabriel García Marquez expressed admiration for the singer

During the 90's with her first two international albums, "Pies Descalzos" and "Dónde Están los Ladrones?", the former shows a combination of sounds that start from Latin pop, alternative rock and reggae. Víctor Manuel García of El Tiempo declared, "The lyrics are clear and the arrangements pleasant". The album opens with "Estoy Aquí", the first single from the album. The lyrics are based on Shakira's friend's failed relationship. Musically, it is a "contagious and melodic pop" song. The theme that follows, "Antología", is a ballad where she describes how she learned to "fly" and how "the traces of this love are preserved". Shakira collaborates with Howard Glasford, leader of the dancehall group Magical Beat, for a reggae "shaker" song. A columnist for El Tiempo described Glasford's voice as "rasta", while "Pies Descalzos, Sueños Blancos" contains an "incredible sound, which is quite harmonious in start to finish. In "¿Dónde Estás Corazón?", Shakira uses verses inspired by Mario Benedetti, Oliverio Girondo and Pablo Neruda, her favorite poets. Likewise, she "creates metaphors and uses elements of nature to make analogies". Pies descalzos closes with "Se Quiere, Se Mata", a track that talks about the "painful issue of abortion". The single "Pies Descalzos, Sueños Blancos" contains various references such as the first choir that reflects on the ephemeral life of the human being through Genesis 3,19 of the Bible. Her second major album, " Dónde Están los Ladrones?", explores the theme of love in its different stages It contains influences of Latin pop but with a greater presence of Latin rock than in its previous album. Within the Latin Pop in which this album is produced, we find two subdivisions according to the sonority of each song; the album opens with "Ciega, Sordomuda", which is musically filled by typical Mexican trumpets over a disco dance loop and an electric guitar. The later song, "Moscas en la Casa", was inspired by the singer's troubled relationship with Puerto Rican actor Osvaldo Ríos. In the next track, "No Creo", the singer expresses how she believes in nothing and nobody except her lover. The song references popular socially accepted or non-accepted norms such as herself, luck, Karl Marx, Jean-Paul Sartre, Venus and Mars, and Brian Weiss. The fifth song is "Inevitable". Lyrically, in the hard rock ballad, Shakira confesses her longing for a former lover despite her understanding that the relationship is ultimately over. The next track "Octavo Día" is a rock-oriented song that refers to God coming to Earth on the "eighth day" of creation after finishing his work, and discovering everything to be in ruins, and decides to quit his job and become a normal man. She also namechecks Bill Clinton and Michael Jackson. The following track, "Tú", lyrically expresses the sweetness of love with emotional and intimate cadence. The album's closing song "Ojos Así" is accompanied by a "Lambadalike middle eastern rhythm". Containing a verse in Arabic, Shakira describes her laments that even though she has traveled from Bahrain to Beirut, she has never found eyes like her lover has.

=== Decade of 2000 ===
Shakira's third album, which was also her crossover into the international market, is mainly a pop rock album, although it is also made up of various musical genres, including the influence of Middle Eastern styles. The track that starts this new musical project is Objection (Tango) which combines elements of rock and roll with more traditional Latin pop rock. "Whenever, Wherever" mixes pop rock with Andean music and contains pan flute and charango instrumentation – traditional instruments generally associated with the genre. The power ballad "Underneath Your Clothes" has Shakira delivering "racked" vocals and features brass instrumentation influenced by English rock band The Beatles. It contains a melody similar to the one in "Eternal Flame", a 1989 song by American all-female band The Bangles. Similarly, the tune of "The One", another power ballad on the album, is similar to that of "Michelle", a 1965 song by The Beatles. Laundry Service also contains four Spanish tracks: "Que Me Quedes Tú", "Te Dejo Madrid", "Suerte" ("Luck") and "Te Aviso, Te Anuncio (Tango)"; the latter two are Spanish translations of "Whenever, Wherever" and "Objection (Tango)", respectively. The lyrics of Laundry Service are based on the love that Shakira went through with her then-partner Antonio de la Rúa. In 2005, Shakira decided to return to the Latin market with an album in Spanish called "Fijación Oral Vol. 1" being composed mostly of songs in the Latin pop genre. "La Tortura" features Spanish singer-songwriter Alejandro Sanz, with elements of Colombian cumbia music, dancehall and electronica. "Las de la Intuición" has synth-pop elements, while "Día de Enero" ("January Day") has been compared to Mexican singer-songwriter Natalia Lafourcade. A few months after her album she released an album considered a "sequel" to her previous record material entitled "Oral Fixation Vol. 2". The album touches on everything from the expected Latin rhythms to glitzy Euro disco, abrasive American rock & roll, and stomping Britpop. The first single, "Don't Bother", presents the final chapter of a relationship and the confusion that faces anyone in a break up. "Illegal" features a guitar solo by Mexican guitarist Carlos Santana. In 2009, Shakira experimented with new sounds on her new album titled, "She Wolf", which is primarily an electropop album that combines influences from the musical styles of various countries and regions, including Africa, Colombia, India, and the Middle East. The title track is an example of the electronic music styled production of the album, and is composed of 70s disco guitars and "heaps of robot effects". "Did It Again" is a midtempo electropop song that contains elements of samba. The US bonus track "Give It Up to Me" mixes pop and hip hop music with a playful rap by Lil Wayne. The lyrics of the tracks on She Wolf, according to Shakira, have been written from a "very feminine perspective". Jocelyn Vena from MTV commented that "Shakira wasn't afraid to get a little wacky when it came to the lyrics on She Wolf". Other themes the album touches upon include night-life, sex, and seduction, in songs like "Did It Again" and "Spy". Rolling Stone Critic Jody Rosen labelled the latter "a meditation on masturbation".

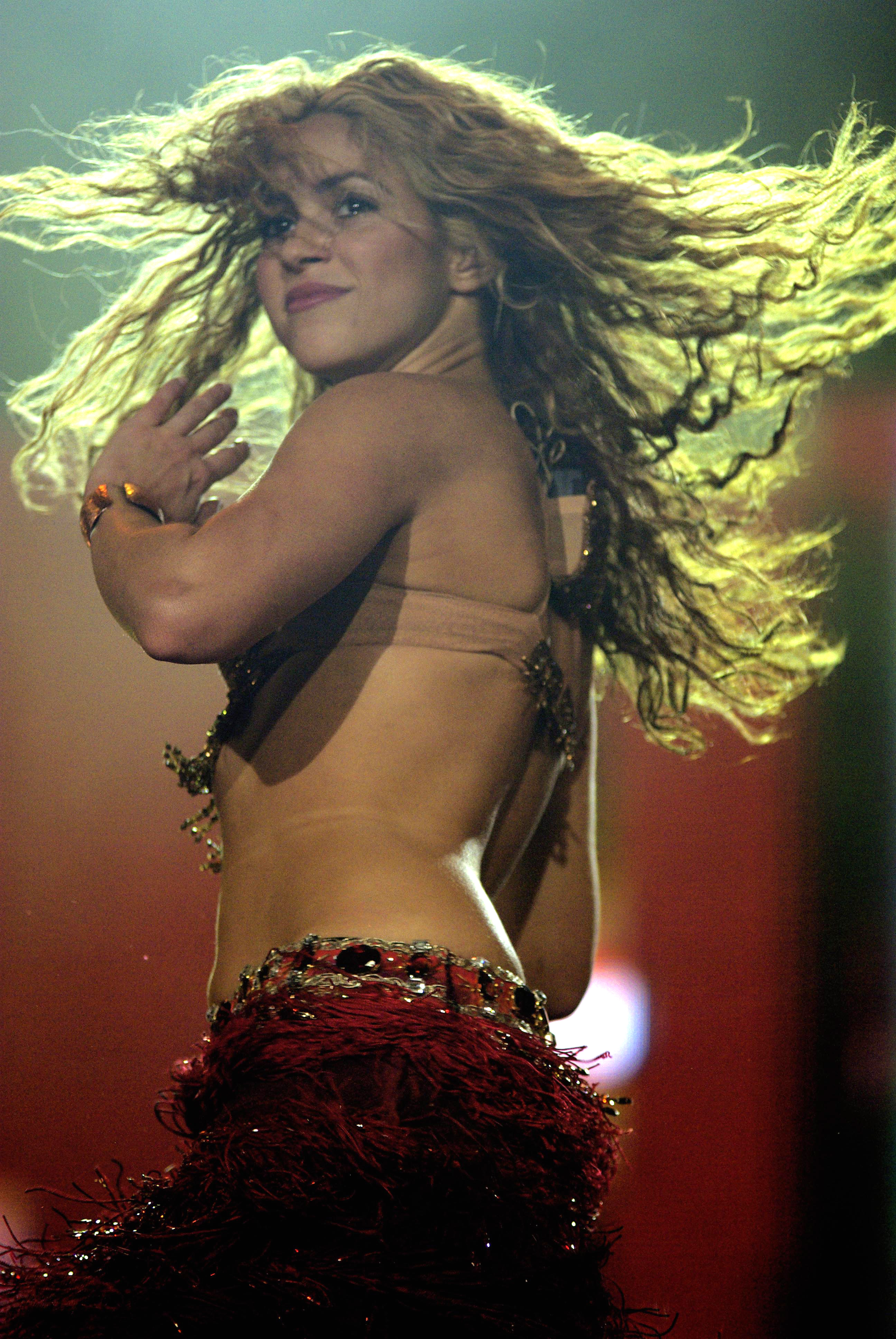
Shakira performing a song on her 2006 "Oral Fixation World Tour"

The album was positively received by most music critics and was praised for its distinguished nature and Shakira's experimentation with electropop. Commercially, She Wolf was a success and topped charts and attained gold and platinum certifications in several South American and European territories.

=== Decade of 2010 ===
In May 2010, Shakira wrote and recorded "Waka Waka (This Time for Africa)", the official song of the 2010 FIFA World Cup, which became a worldwide hit. Sale el Sol is considered to be Shakira's return to her "roots" and is a "fusion between rock and pop heavily influenced from Latino and Colombian music". "Loca" ("Crazy"), is Shakira's interpretation of El Cata's song "Loca Con Su Tiguere", and is composed of horn-heavy merengue beats set over techno dance percussion beats. Similarly, "Rabiosa" ("Rabid") is Shakira's interpretation of El Cata's song "La Rabiosa", and is a fast-paced merengue-influenced dance track. In addition to merengue, songs like "Addicted to You", which features "bilingual lyrics, a very 70's chorus and Copacabana sounds". The album include ballads like "Antes de las Seis" ("Before Six O'Clock") where Shakira delivers "sad, emotional, and heartfelt vocals". In 2014, she released her self-titled album "Shakira", which was described as an "uneasy bargain" between a "rootsy, often acoustic-based pop with a rangy feel and an affinity for early Alanis Morissette". The second track "Can't Remember to Forget You", is an uptempo new wave and reggae rock "Empire" is a mid-tempo rock-influenced song, described as being Shakira's biggest rock transition in a long time since her earlier music. "La La La (Brazil 2014)" is included on the Latin American and Spanish deluxe edition of the album; it is a re-worked version of the song "Dare (La La La)" with new lyrics for the 2014 World Cup. "El Dorado" is the eleventh studio album by Shakira, released in 2017. "Chantaje", the lead single, is an electronic pop song with synths and shuffling beats., The first track is " Me Enamoré", a "bouncy pop song infused with electronica," with "digitally-stuttered lyrical breakdown". The song "Perro Fiel" is a pop-reggaeton duet with the reggaeton singer Nicky Jam. "Trap" was the second duet with Maluma and was considered "a whispery ballad that fuses Spanish-language pop with the brittle{{ }} R&B rhythms of trap." Shakira's duet with Carlos Vives on "La Bicicleta" ("The Bicycle") is also included on the album. The track, which is a vallenato and reggaeton song "Deja Vu" was also described as a "salsa-flavored percussive" track.

== Controversies and criticism ==
Despite having positive reviews from critics and the general public, some of Shakira's songs aroused controversy in the public due to some topics that she touched on in her songs, whether they were topics such as abortion, drugs, and religion. Songs like "Se Quiere, Se Mata", "Poem to a horse" and "Octavo Día" aroused criticism about her thoughts in the religious population of Latin America and especially Colombia because they considered the latter as "blasphemous", the song by Shakira "Ojos Así" was believed to be a "satanic" song that was against God due to the symbolism of Shakira in that song and part of its lyrics. When Shakira made her crossover, her lyrics in English were mocked by some critics who questioned her ability as a composer, while in Latin America several claimed that her lyrics were no longer the same and that she had changed for more "basic" lyrics. Later in 2004 when he released her album "Live & off the Record" her song that promoted the album "Poem to a Horse" was censored on American radio due to its lyrics that involved drug addiction issues.

== Legacy ==
Shakira was quickly the center of attention by the media due to her "unique" style musically speaking, differentiating herself from established pop artists. A large part of the comments on Shakira came due to her appearance as a "phenomenon" in the public, several journalists described her as a promise of Colombian or even Latin music. Her rock-influenced musical style as well as Latin pop with heartfelt lyrics about love and heartbreak was described as a woman who "laid the groundwork for several Latina rockers of the future." According to Rolling Stone, Shakira had managed to redefine the landscape of Latin music with her first two albums. Even since her appearance in the music market, she caught the attention of experts in the marketing area due to the high figures of her sales, which experts say is due to her singing, dancing, charisma and, above all, a proposal that was exact for a success at the level international. Her lyrical work is a constant influence for various women who seek to express their feelings in their respective albums as Shakira did. According with Ivor Novello Awards her lyrics have "opened the doors" so that the new generation of Latin artists can shine on the international scene.

== Recognitions ==
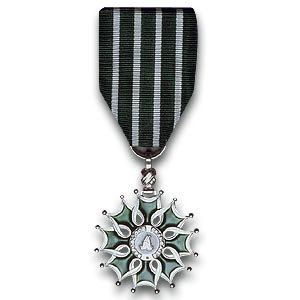
Shakira received a decoration from the Ordre des Arts et des Lettres from the French Minister of Culture Frédéric Mitterrand

According to some media and the general public, Shakira is considered one of the most influential Latin female artist of all time, according to Billboard several of her songs have marked generations, from heartbreaking ballads to pop anthems. Some media and magazines recognize Shakira's great influence within the field of Latin music, according to The New York Times Shakira can be seen as an "innovator of Latin alternative rock", some others consider her a pioneer of bringing Latin rhythms to the whole world thanks to her songs. According to Leila Cobo of Rolling Stone you have noted that Shakira in the 1990s with her album ¿Donde están los ladrones? was "redefining the parameters" of Rock en español. In 2012 Shakira received. In 2012 Shakira received a decoration from the Ordre des Arts et des Lettres from the French Minister of Culture Frédéric Mitterrand. In the United States, she was nominated in 2016 to enter the "Latin Songwriters Hall of Fame" due to her songs. In the year 2022 Shakira received the "Ivor Novello in collaboration with Apple Music" award celebrating her songwriting in both English and Spanish. In the HBO biographical series of Shakira they explain she showed her Latin heritage to the whole world influencing what time the Latin sounds we hear is thanks to her. Her discography is often selected by various media to make a count of her best songs.

== See also ==
- Shakira discography
- List of awards and nominations received by Shakira
- List of cover versions of Shakira songs
