= List of Shakira concerts =

Shakira concerts
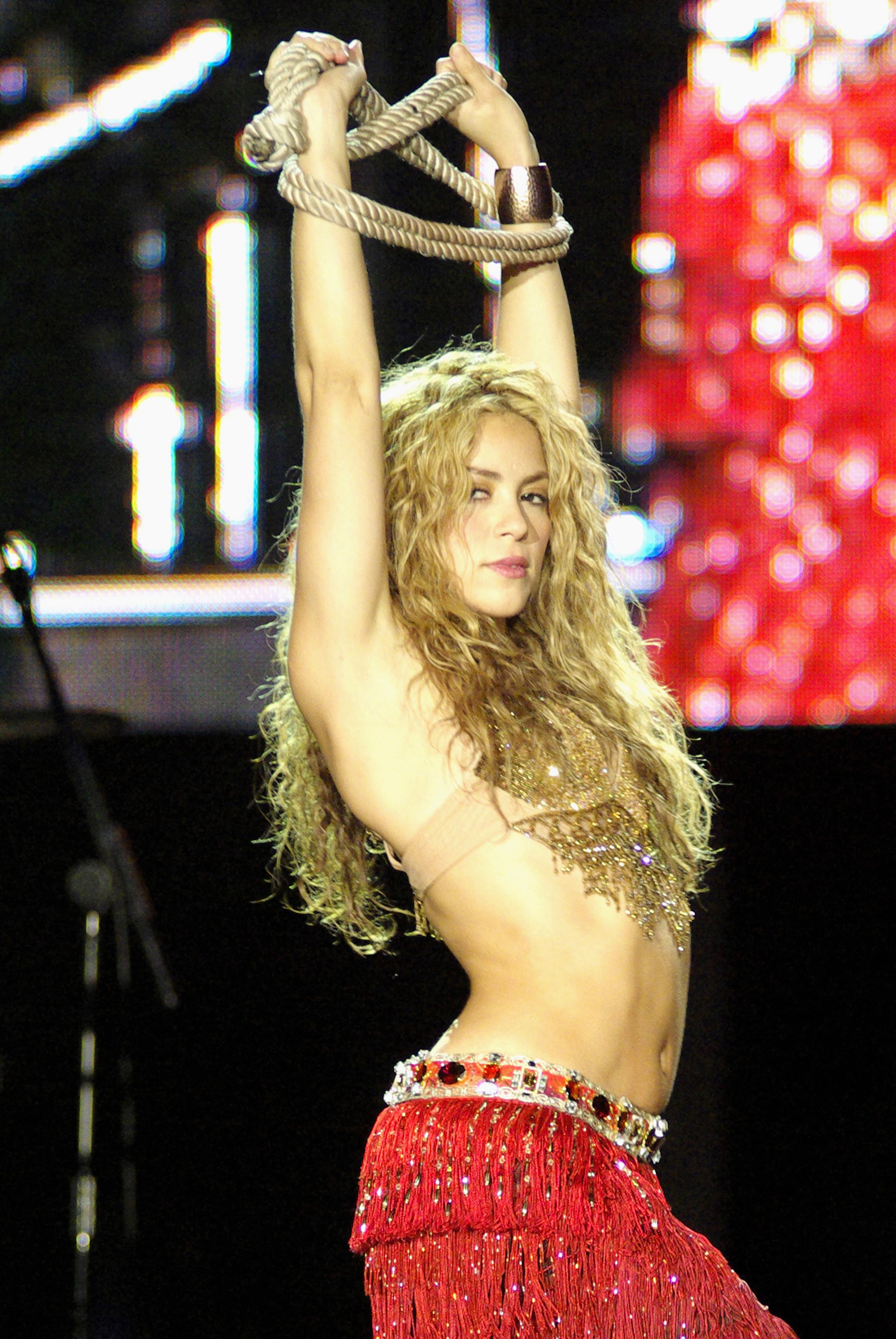
- Shakira at the Rock in Rio concert in 2008.
- Concert tours: 7
- One-off concerts: 6
- Benefit concerts: 4
- Music festivals: 10

Colombian singer Shakira has performed on seven concert tours of which five are worldwide, six one-off concerts, four benefit concerts and ten music festivals.

== Pies Descalzos Tour, Anfibio Tour and Tour of the Mongoose ==
Her 1997 debut concert tour, the Pies Descalzos Tour, took place in North America, South America, and one country in Europe alone, grossing over US$5 million (based on as-record figures). In 2000 she performed on her Anfibio Tour, which visited only North and South America, earning more than US$10 million (based on the figures of which there are second records), being a moderate success and totally sold-out in countries like Brazil, where Shakira has always maintained a strong following, something never quite achieved before for a Spanish-language artist. It was after the global success of her English crossover album Laundry Service (2001) that Shakira would embark on one of the most successful tours of her entire career, with the Tour of the Mongoose being her highest-grossing yet (up until that point). The tour was a success in countries such as France, USA, the United Kingdom, Brazil and throughout Latin America. During this tour, Shakira would perform for massive crowds regularly, in a way rarely ever seen before by a Latin female artist, much less from Colombia. Unexpectedly, Shakira became the first Latin female solo artist to perform at the Estadio Monumental Antonio Vespucio Liberti (also called River Plate Stadium) in La Plata, Argentina; the sold-out show was attended by more than 60,000 people. Her concert in Santiago, Chile broke Luis Miguel's record for the most-expensive concert tickets in the country’s history, mostly due to Shakira's 2001-2002 rise in global popularity and a high demand from fans. Her first-time show in Portugal, at the Pavilhão Atlântico, Lisbon, attracted 19,136 people, breaking the attendance record for the venue previously held by the American rock trio R.E.M.

== Oral Fixation World Tour ==
Several years after the success of her first global tour, Shakira would embark on a second, larger tour, thanks to the success of her albums Fijación Oral Vol. 1 and Oral Fixation Vol. 2. Shakira simply titled the tour the Oral Fixation World Tour, after the albums. The tour itself was notable for its extensive list of countries and cities in which Shakira and her band visited. This was her first tour where she performed in the Middle East and South Asia, specifically in Cairo, Egypt, Mumbai, India and Dubai, United Arab Emirates. Shakira broke many records during this tour. In Athens, Greece, she became the first female singer to have a show at the Olympic Stadium, attracting more than 40,000 people. In Timisoara, Romania, she is the only female singer who has performed at the Stadionul Dan Păltinișanu, with more than 30,000 spectators (until 2017). At the American Airlines Arena, Miami, Florida, she holds a record for having the most consecutive shows (5) for a female artist at the arena. In Cairo, more than 100,000 people flocked to see Shakira at her concert on the Giza Plateau. This set the record for having the highest attendance of any concert in Egypt's history. At the Palacio de los Deportes in Mexico City, Shakira had 8 back-to-back shows scheduled at the venue, another record for having the most shows at a venue as a female solo artist. She had a sold-out show in Ecuador’s Estadio Modelo Alberto Spencer Herrera, Guayaquil, with over 42,000 people, becoming the only female singer (at the time) to have performed there. In Santiago, her scheduled show at Movistar Arena quickly sold out, and she soon added a second, larger-capacity show at the nearby Estadio Nacional which also sold-out completely. This tour became Shakira’s highest-grossing tour and the highest-grossing Latin music tour of all time.

== Sale el Sol World Tour and El Dorado World Tour ==
To promote the albums She Wolf and Sale el Sol Shakira began her tour The Sun Comes Out, being a success and breaking more attendance records for a Latin artist in general than ever before witnessed. She visited a total of 107 cities raising nearly 80 million dollars and breaking records in Mérida (Mexico) where she broke the attendance record where 170,000 people attended. The concert in Lebanon was attended by 28,000 people, breaking the country's all-time attendance record. It was one of the highest-grossing tours of 2010. According to Pollstar, the tour grossed a total of $16.9 million during its North American dates, making it number 40 on Pollstar's "Top 50 North American Tours" year-end 2010 list.

Years later without any tour presented in almost 6 years Shakira embarked on a new tour to promote her most recent record material "El Dorado" raising 70 million dollars breaking records again in countries like Mexico where she was the first female artist to fill the Stadium Azteca twice in a row and in Ecuador, broke the record previously held by Bruno Mars for having sold the most tickets during a presale period.

== Concert tours ==
Title	Date	Associated album(s)	Continent(s)	Shows	Gross	Ref.
Pies Descalzos Tour	February 28, 1996 – October 10, 1997	Pies Descalzos	South America; North America; Europe	60	$6,000,000	-
Tour Anfibio	March 21, 2000 – May 12, 2000	¿Dónde Están los Ladrones?	South America; North America	21	$3,500,000	-
Tour of the Mongoose	November 8, 2002 – May 11, 2003	Laundry Service	North America; South America; Europe	61	$22,000,000	
Oral Fixation Tour	June 14, 2006 – December 23, 2007	Fijación Oral Vol. 1 Oral Fixation Vol. 2	Europe; Africa; Asia; North America; Central America; South America; Asia	119	$110,000,000	
The Sun Comes Out World Tour	September 15, 2010 – October 15, 2011	She Wolf; Sale el Sol	Europe; North America; South America; Asia	107	$62,000,000	
El Dorado World Tour	June 3, 2018 – November 3, 2018	El Dorado	Europe; Asia; North America; South America	54	$75,000,000	
Las Mujeres Ya No Lloran World Tour	February 11, 2025 – October 11, 2026	Las Mujeres Ya No Lloran	South America; North America; Africa; Asia; Europe	127		

=== Songs played on each tour ===
Made throughout the tour.
Made only in some of the parts of the route.
Performed only on a selected date.

Album	Song Title	Tour Pies Descalzos	Tour Anfibio	Tour of the Mongoose	Oral Fixation Tour	The Sun Comes Out World Tour	El Dorado World Tour	Las Mujeres Ya No Lloran World Tour
Magia	Magia	✓	—	—	—	—	—	—
Magia	Tú Serás la Historia De Mi Vida	✓	—	—	—	—	—	—
Pies Descalzos	Estoy Aquí	✓	✓	✓	✓	✓	✓	✓
Pies Descalzos	¿Dónde Estás Corazón?	✓	✓	—	—	—	✓	—
Pies Descalzos	Pies Descalzos, Sueños Blancos	✓	✓	—	✓	—	—	✓
Pies Descalzos	Un Poco de Amor	✓	—	✓	—	—	—	—
Pies Descalzos	Antología	✓	✓	—	✓	—	✓	✓
Pies Descalzos	Se Quiere, Se Mata	✓	—	—	—	—	—	—
Pies Descalzos	Quiero	✓	—	—	—	—	—	—
Pies Descalzos	Te Necesito	✓	—	—	—	—	—	—
Pies Descalzos	Te Espero Sentada	✓	—	—	—	—	—	—
Pies Descalzos	Vuelve	✓	—	—	—	—	—	—
Pies Descalzos	Pienso en ti	✓	—	—	—	✓	—	—
¿Dónde Están los Ladrones?	Ciega, Sordomuda	—	✓	✓	✓	✓	—	✓
¿Dónde Están los Ladrones?	Tú	—	✓	✓	—	—	✓	—
¿Dónde Están los Ladrones?	Inevitable	—	✓	✓	✓	✓	✓	✓
¿Dónde Están los Ladrones?	Ojos Así	—	✓	✓	✓	✓	—	✓
¿Dónde Están los Ladrones?	Moscas en la casa	—	✓	—	—	—	—	—
¿Dónde Están los Ladrones?	Si Te Vas	—	✓	✓	✓	✓	✓	—
¿Dónde Están los Ladrones?	No Creo	—	✓	—	—	—	—	—
¿Dónde Están los Ladrones?	Octavo Día	—	✓	✓	—	—	—	—
¿Dónde Están los Ladrones?	¿Dónde Están los Ladrones?	—	✓	✓	—	—	—	—
¿Dónde Están los Ladrones?	Sombra de ti	—	✓	—	—	—	—	—
Laundry Service	Whenever, Wherever / Suerte	—	—	✓	✓	✓	✓	✓
Laundry Service	Underneath Your Clothes	—	—	✓	✓	✓	✓	—
Laundry Service	Te Dejo Madrid	—	—	✓	✓	✓	—	—
Laundry Service	Objection / Te Aviso, Te Anuncio (Tango)	—	—	✓	—	—	—	✓
Laundry Service	Que Me Quedes Tú	—	—	✓	—	—	—	—
Laundry Service	The One	—	—	✓	—	—	—	—
Laundry Service	Poem to a Horse	—	—	✓	—	—	—	✓
Laundry Service	Fool	—	—	✓	—	—	—	—
Laundry Service	Rules	—	—	✓	—	—	—	—
Laundry Service	Ready for The Good Times	—	—	✓	—	—	—	—
Fijación Oral / Oral Fixation	La Tortura	—	—	—	✓	✓	✓	✓
Fijación Oral / Oral Fixation	No	—	—	—	✓	—	—	—
Fijación Oral / Oral Fixation	Don't Bother	—	—	—	✓	—	—	✓
Fijación Oral / Oral Fixation	Día de Enero	—	—	—	✓	—	—	—
Fijación Oral / Oral Fixation	Hips Don't Lie	—	—	—	✓	✓	✓	✓
Fijación Oral / Oral Fixation	La Pared	—	—	—	✓	—	—	—
Fijación Oral / Oral Fixation	Illegal	—	—	—	✓	—	—	—
Fijación Oral / Oral Fixation	Las De La Intuición	—	—	—	—	✓	—	✓
Fijación Oral / Oral Fixation	Obtener Un Sí	—	—	—	✓	—	—	—
Fijación Oral / Oral Fixation	Día Especial	—	—	—	✓	—	—	—
Fijación Oral / Oral Fixation	Hey You	—	—	—	✓	—	—	—
Fijación Oral / Oral Fixation	Animal City	—	—	—	✓	—	—	—
She Wolf	She Wolf / Loba	—	—	—	—	✓	✓	✓
She Wolf	Gypsy / Gitana	—	—	—	—	✓	—	—
She Wolf	Why Wait / Años Luz	—	—	—	—	✓	—	—
Sale el Sol	Waka Waka (This Time For Africa / Esto Es África)	—	—	—	—	✓	✓	✓
Sale el Sol	Loca	—	—	—	—	✓	✓	✓
Sale el Sol	Rabiosa	—	—	—	—	—	✓	—
Sale el Sol	Sale el Sol	—	—	—	—	✓	—	—
Sale el Sol	Antes de las seis	—	—	—	—	✓	—	—
Sale el Sol	Addicted To You	—	—	—	—	—	—	✓
Sale el Sol	Gordita	—	—	—	—	✓	—	—
Shakira	Boig Per Tu	—	—	—	—	—	✓	—
Shakira	Dare (Lalala)	—	—	—	—	—	✓	—
Shakira	Empire	—	—	—	—	—	—	✓
Shakira	Can't Remember to Forget You	—	—	—	—	—	✓	—
El Dorado	Chantaje	—	—	—	—	—	✓	✓
El Dorado	Perro Fiel	—	—	—	—	—	✓	—
El Dorado	Nada	—	—	—	—	—	✓	—
El Dorado	Toneladas	—	—	—	—	—	✓	—
El Dorado	Me Enamoré	—	—	—	—	—	✓	—
El Dorado	La Bicicleta	—	—	—	—	—	✓	✓
El Dorado	Amarillo	—	—	—	—	—	✓	—
Las Mujeres Ya No Lloran	Bzrp Music Sessions Vol. 53	—	—	—	—	—	—	✓
Las Mujeres Ya No Lloran	TQG	—	—	—	—	—	—	✓
Las Mujeres Ya No Lloran	Te Felicito	—	—	—	—	—	—	✓
Las Mujeres Ya No Lloran	Copa Vacía	—	—	—	—	—	—	✓
Las Mujeres Ya No Lloran	Como, Donde y Cuando	—	—	—	—	—	—	✓
Las Mujeres Ya No Lloran	Monotonía	—	—	—	—	—	—	✓
Las Mujeres Ya No Lloran	Acróstico	—	—	—	—	—	—	✓
Las Mujeres Ya No Lloran	El Jefe	—	—	—	—	—	—	✓
Las Mujeres Ya No Lloran	Última	—	—	—	—	—	—	✓
Las Mujeres Ya No Lloran	La Fuerte	—	—	—	—	—	—	✓
Singles/Covers	Alfonsina y el mar	—	✓	—	—	—	—	—
Singles/Covers	Dude (Looks Like a Lady)	—	—	✓	—	—	—	—
Singles/Covers	Back in Black	—	—	✓	—	—	—	—
Singles/Covers	El Nay A'atini Nay	—	—	—	✓	✓	—	—
Singles/Covers	Nothing Else Matters	—	—	—	—	✓	—	—
Singles/Covers	Despedida	—	—	—	—	✓	—	—
Singles/Covers	Je L'Aime À Mourir	—	—	—	—	✓	—	—
Singles/Covers	País Tropical	—	—	—	—	✓	—	—
Singles/Covers	El Perdon	—	—	—	—	—	✓	—
Singles/Covers	Girl Like Me	—	—	—	—	—	—	✓
Singles/Covers	Soltera	—	—	—	—	—	—	✓

== One-off concerts ==
Date	Event	Country	Performed song(s)	Ref.
2001 - 2002	Laundry Service promotional shows	Japan	Whenever, Wherever, Underneath Your Clothes, Inevitable, Objection (Tango), Ojos Así	
2001 - 2002	Laundry Service promotional shows	United States	Whenever, Wherever, Underneath Your Clothes, Inevitable, Objection (Tango), Ojos Así	
2001 - 2002	Laundry Service promotional shows	Germany	Whenever, Wherever, Underneath Your Clothes, Inevitable, Objection (Tango), Ojos Así	
2001 - 2002	Laundry Service promotional shows	United Kingdom	Whenever, Wherever, Underneath Your Clothes, Inevitable, Objection (Tango), Ojos Así	
2001 - 2002	Laundry Service promotional shows	France	Whenever, Wherever, Underneath Your Clothes, Inevitable, Objection (Tango), Ojos Así	
2001 - 2002	Laundry Service promotional shows	Brazil	Whenever, Wherever, Underneath Your Clothes, Inevitable, Objection (Tango), Ojos Así	
June 12, 2002	Kaivopuiston kesäkonsertti	Helsinki	Whenever, Wherever, Underneath Your Clothes	
August 12, 1999	MTV Unplugged	Manhattan	Set list of her album "¿Dónde Están los Ladrones?"	
March 12, 2006	Fashion Rock	London	La Tortura	
July 9, 2006	FIFA World Cup Closure	Germany	Hips Don't Lie (Bamboo Remix)	
December 31, 2008	Abu Dhabi New Year's Eve Party	United Arab Emirates	Estoy Aqui, Te dejo Madrid, Don't Bother, Si Te Vas, La Tortura, La Pared, Illegal, Underneath Your Clothes, Ojos Así, Whenever, Wherever, Hips Don't Lie	
June 10, 2010	FIFA World Cup Opening	South Africa	She Wolf, Hips Don't Lie, Waka Waka (This Time for Africa)	
July 13, 2014	FIFA World Cup Closure	Brazil	La La La (Brazil 2014)	
October 13, 2012	Fifa Women's World Cup	Azerbaiján	Waka Waka (This Time for Africa)	
February 14, 2010	NBA Halftime Show	Texas	She Wolf, Give It Up to Me	
December 27, 2010	China New Year's Eve	China	Hips Don't Lie, Waka Waka, Ojos Así	
October 14, 2012	The Crystal Hall Concert	Azerbaijan	Whenever, Wherever, Somebody That I Used to Know, La Tortura, Hips Don't Lie	
November 24, 2019	Davis Cup	Madrid	She Wolf, Tutu (Remix), La La La (Brazil 2014)	
February 2, 2020	Super Bowl Halftime Show LIV	United States	She Wolf, Hips Don't Lie, Ojos Así, Empire, I Like It, Chantaje, Waka Waka, La La La (Brazil 2014)	

== Benefit concerts ==
Date	Event	City	Performed song(s)	Ref.
July 7, 2007	Live Earth	Hamburgo	Inevitable, Don't Bother, Día Especial	
May 17, 2008	Alas Foundation mega-concert	Buenos Aires	Te lo agradezco pero no, Inevitable, La Tortura, La Maza, Hips don't Lie, La Ciudad de la Furia.	
June 27, 2020	European Commission concert (Global Goal)	Virtual	Sale el Sol + Inspirational message	
March 12, 2021	Music on a mission	Virtual	Whenever Wherever + Inspirational message	

== Music festivals ==
Date	Event	Place	Performed song(s)	Ref.
February 14, 1993	Viña del Mar International Song Festival	Chile	Eres	
July 7, 2002	Party in the Park	London	Whenever Wherever, Underneath Your Clothes, Objection (Tango)	
March 7, 2002	Sanremo Song Festival	Italia	Whenever Wherever	
May 7, 2008	Rock in Rio	Arganda del Rey	Te dejo Madrid, Inevitable, Hips Don't Lie, Si te vas, Whenever Wherever, Ojos Así	
June 6, 2010	Rock in Rio	Madrid	Te dejo Madrid, Inevitable, Si te vas, Ciega, sordomuda, She Wolf, Sale el Sol, Ojos Así	
June 26, 2010	Glastonbury Festival	England	Hips Don't Lie, Waka Waka, Whenever Wherever, She Wolf, Inevitable	
May 10, 2014	Wango Tango	Los Angeles	Hips Don't Lie, Empire, 23, You Don't Care About Me.	
July 5, 2017	Global Citizen Festival	Germany	Chantaje, Me Enamoré	
July 13, 2018	Cedars International Festival	Lebanon	As part of "El Dorado World Tour"	
May 24, 2025	Sueños Festival	United States	As part of "Las Mujeres Ya No Lloran World Tour"	

== Shakira live album charts ==
=== Live albums ===
List of live albums, with selected chart positions and certifications
Title	Album details	Peak chart positions							Certifications
Title	Album details	BEL (WA)	FRA	GER	MEX	PRT	SPA	US Latin	Certifications
MTV Unplugged	Released: 29 February 2000 (US); Label: Sony Music; Formats: Cassette, CD, DVD, digital download, LP	—	—	91	—	—	—	1	AMPROFON: Platinum; BVMI: Gold; RIAA: 4× Platinum (Latin)
Live & Off the Record	Released: 22 March 2004 (US); Label: Epic; Formats: CD, DVD, digital download	43	—	14	—	4	73	—	AMPROFON: Gold; ARIA: Gold (DVD); RIAA: Gold (DVD)
Oral Fixation Tour	Released: 13 November 2007 (US); Label: Epic; Formats: Blu-ray, CD, DVD, digital download	—	—	71	1	5	—	—	AMPROFON: Platinum; RIAA: Platinum (DVD)
Live from Paris	Released: 5 December 2011 (FRA); Label: Epic; Formats: Blu-ray, CD, DVD, digital download	16	8	43	4	25	18	2	SNEP: Platinum; AMPROFON: Platinum+Gold
Shakira in Concert: El Dorado World Tour	Released: 13 November 2019; Label: Sony; Formats: Digital download	—	—	—	—	—	—	18	
"—" denotes a title that did not chart, or was not released in that territory.

== See also ==
- List of highest-grossing concert tours by Latin artists
