= Tour Anfibio =

2000 concert tour by Shakira

- Tour by Shakira
- Promotional poster for the tour in Chile
- Location: North America; South America
- Associated album: Dónde Están los Ladrones?
- Start date: March 21, 2000
- End date: May 12, 2000
- No. of shows: 20

Shakira concert chronology
- Tour Pies Descalzos (1996–1997); Tour Anfibio (2000); Tour of the Mongoose (2002–2003)

Tour Anfibio (English: Amphibian Tour) was the second concert tour by Colombian singer-songwriter Shakira, in support of her fourth studio album Dónde Están los Ladrones? (1998). It started on March 21, 2000, in Lima, and ended on May 12 in Buenos Aires. The tour was sponsored by Nokia during its South American legs.

== Background ==
The tour's setlist consisted of songs from her albums Pies Descalzos (1996) and Dónde Están los Ladrones? (1998). In addition, she included an a capella song, "Alfonsina y el mar", originally by Argentine folk singer Mercedes Sosa.

The tour received criticism due to the overselling of tickets in Guatemala, where around 5,000 to 7,000 tickets were sold for a stadium with a maximum capacity of 4,000. The concert was also delayed for the day after the planned date due to problems with the stage, which caused fans to partially destroy one of the stadium gates and damage several vehicles parked outside, and around 25 people fainted in the midst of the commotion.

Due to the tour's success, extra concerts were added. After three sold out shows in Luna Park, Shakira decided to bring the tour back to Buenos Aires due to popular demand. A fourth date was added, taking place at Campo Argentino de Polo, with around 25,000 attendees. The show had people in the blocks near the stadium to prevent overcrowding of the region and, according to residents' testimonies, the loud music caused the buildings to shake. The concerts at Auditorio Nacional, Mexico City, and Luna Park, Buenos Aires, were broadcast on national television.

== Critical reception ==
Ernesto Lechner from Los Angeles Times praised the concerts and the artist, saying, "Everything about Colombian rock star Shakira spells perfection - with a capital P. Her powerful voice. Her gorgeous looks. Her effortlessly sensuous dancing. Her commanding stage presence". He highlighted the performance of "Ojos Así" by calling it "superb", and asserting that her shows are meant to be seen live.

== Setlist ==
This set list is from the May 12, 2000, concert in Buenos Aires. It may not represent all of the concerts during the duration of the tour.

1. "¿Dónde Estás Corazón?"
2. "Si Te Vas"
3. "Inevitable"
4. "Dónde Están los Ladrones?"
5. "Antología"
6. "Ojos Así"
7. "Octavo Día"
8. "Moscas en la Casa"
9. "Ciega, Sordomuda"
10. "Tú"
11. "Alfonsina y el mar"
12. "Pies Descalzos, Sueños Blancos"
13. "Estoy Aquí"
14. "Sombra de Ti"
15. "No Creo"

== Tour dates ==
| Date | City | Country | Venue |
South America
| March 21, 2000 | Lima | Peru | Hipódromo de Monterrico |
| March 24, 2000 | Montevideo | Uruguay | Velódromo Municipal de Montevideo |
| March 25, 2000 | Buenos Aires | Argentina | Luna Park |
| March 26, 2000 | Buenos Aires | Argentina | Luna Park |
| March 27, 2000 | Buenos Aires | Argentina | Luna Park |
| March 29, 2000 | Santiago | Chile | Estadio Nacional |
| April 1, 2000 | Caracas | Venezuela | Poliedro de Caracas |
| April 2, 2000 | Valencia | Venezuela | Forum de Valencia |
| April 4, 2000 | Maracaibo | Venezuela | Palacio de Eventos de Venezuela |
| April 6, 2000 | Bogotá | Colombia | Estadio El Campín |
North America
| April 8, 2000 | San Juan | Puerto Rico | Hiram Bithorn Stadium |
| April 11, 2000 | Mexico City | Mexico | National Auditorium |
| April 12, 2000 | Mexico City | Mexico | National Auditorium |
| April 16, 2000 | Guatemala City | Guatemala | Estadio del Ejército |
| April 18, 2000 | San Diego | United States | San Diego Sports Arena |
| April 19, 2000 | Anaheim | United States | Arrowhead Pond of Anaheim |
| April 21, 2000 | Miami | United States | Miami Arena |
| May 5, 2000 | Santo Domingo | Dominican Republic | Fortaleza Ozama |
| May 8, 2000 | Panama City | Panama | Estadio Rommel Fernández |
South America
| May 12, 2000 | Buenos Aires | Argentina | Campo Argentino de Polo |

== Box office score data ==
| Venue | City | Tickets sold / available | Gross revenue |
|---|---|---|---|
| Poliedro de Caracas | Caracas | 11,500 / 11,500 | $562,164 |
| Forum de Valencia | Valencia | 6,500 / 6,500 | $304,775 |
| Palacio de Eventos de Venezuela | Maracaibo | 6,000 / 6,200 | $329,217 |
| National Auditorium | Mexico City | 19,187 / 19,187 | $656,646 |
| San Diego Sports Arena | San Diego | 10,064 / 10,064 | $446,460 |
| Arrowhead Pond of Anaheim | Anaheim | 12,208 / 12,208 | $547,090 |
| Campo Argentino de Polo | Buenos Aires | 25,000 / 25,000 | —N/a |
| Total | | 90,459 / 90,659 | $2,846,352 |
