= Inevitable (Shakira song) =

- Artwork used for promotional CD single in Spain

Single by Shakira

from the album ¿Dónde Están los Ladrones?
- Released: December 15, 1998
- Recorded: 1997
- Studio: Crescent Moon Studios (Miami, Florida)
- Genre: Rock en español
- Length: 3:16
- Label: Sony Music Colombia
- Composers: Shakira; Luis Fernando Ochoa
- Lyricist: Shakira
- Producers: Shakira; Luis Fernando Ochoa

Shakira singles chronology
"Tú" (1998)	"Inevitable" (1998)	"No Creo" (1999)

Music video
- "Inevitable" on YouTube

"Inevitable" is a song by Colombian singer-songwriter Shakira. It was released on 15 December 1998 by Sony Music Colombia, and is included as the fifth track in her album, Dónde Están los Ladrones? (1998). The sentimental ballad is about a woman’s honesty to her former lover and how she feels her life to be subsequently monotonous. In the accompanying music video, Shakira is depicted as singing in an arena full of admirers screaming for her. Shakira wrote the lyrics for the song. Along with Luis Fernando Ochoa, she composed the music and managed the production.

"Inevitable" was well-received by critics, and won a Broadcast Music, Inc. (BMI) Latin Award in 2000. In the Billboard Hot Latin Songs chart, it appeared for twelve weeks and peaked at the third position. The song is included in the set list for Tour Anfibio (2000), Tour of the Mongoose (2002–2003), Oral Fixation Tour (2006–2007), The Sun Comes Out World Tour (2010–2011), and El Dorado World Tour (2018). An acoustic performance of the song is included in Shakira's first live album, MTV Unplugged (2000). Retrospectively, "Inevitable" has been noted by critics as one of Shakira's best works in her entire career.

== Background ==
After rising to prominence with her successful debut album Pies Descalzos (1995), a longtime friend of Shakira introduced her to well-known producer Emilio Estefan. He decided to work with her, whom he found having potential to break into the United States Latin music market. At the beginning, Shakira was concerned of his creative control over her music, so before signing their contract, the roles and duties were finalized: Estefan would be her manager and executive producer, but she would be in charge of all material and arrangements and have final approval over her records. Since then, they started working on Estefan's Crescent Moon Studios in Miami, Florida. Equipment for recording Dónde Están los Ladrones? included old amplifiers to achieve a better sound, a 40-year-old German microphone, and several innovations in the instrumental mixes. The album took nine months to produce. Shakira was involved with the compositions for all the tracks in the album, including "Inevitable".

== Composition ==
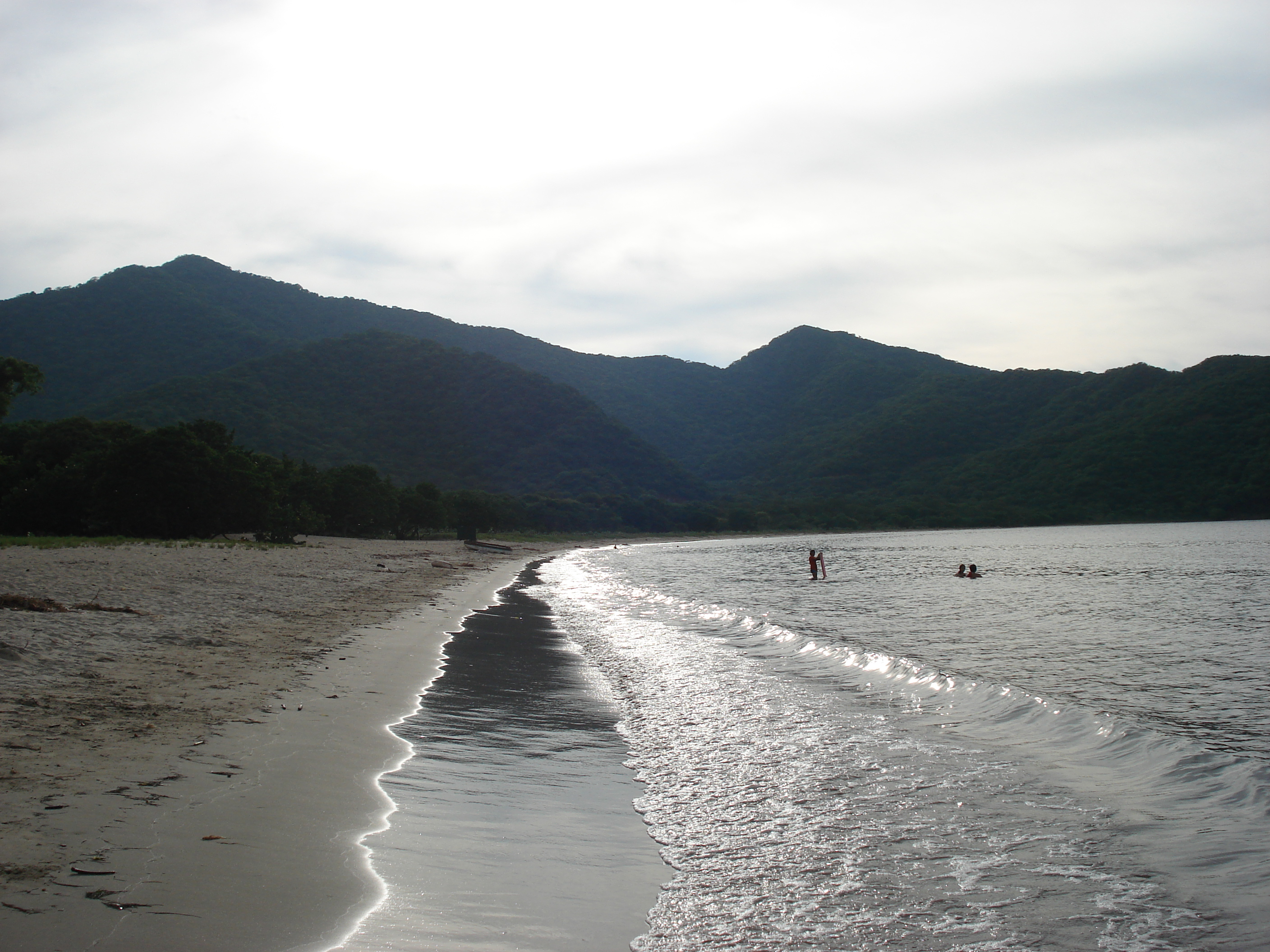
View of Neguanje beach in Tayrona National Natural Park, where Shakira wrote the lyrics for the song.

Shakira co-wrote and produced "Inevitable" with Luis Fernando Ochoa. The song was written while Shakira was vacationing with Ochoa and other friends in Tayrona National Natural Park, a protected area close to her hometown of Barranquilla. One night, between 11 and 12, while being in a chinchorro in Neguanje beach, located in the Palangana sector of the park, the sky was "covered with stars." Shakira says that she was so inspired that she and Ochoa ended up co-writing the song in 15 minutes. Shakira wrote the lyrics and co-wrote the music with Ochoa. “Inevitable” revolves around a woman's honesty to her former lover that she cannot accept that their relationship has ended, and the monotony of life that she has to face afterwards. It is the fifth track of the album, following “No Creo” and preceding “Octavo Día”. The genre has been variously described as Latin rock, rock en español, and sentimental ballad. Described by Billboard as a “heartbreak song”, musical instrumentals used in “Inevitable” include guitars, which in the beginning play calmly before becoming explosive. The song has an accompanying music video, featuring the singer “with her tiny black braids” in an arena full of her admirers and enwreathed by bubbles and glitters; she is seen doing headbanging and high-kicking as well, while the audience is cheering at her.

== Release and reception ==
Sony Music Colombia released “Inevitable” on September 29, 1998. Franz Reynold of Latin Beat Magazine wrote that “Shakira’s naturally sad tones are employed to fine effect” in “Inevitable” and “Tú”. Commercially, “Inevitable” appeared in the Billboard Hot Latin Songs chart for twelve weeks, peaking at the third position. In 1999, Shakira sang its English-language version in The Rosie O’Donnell Show, becoming her first performance in the language. Singer Gloria Estefan, a guest on the show, said that Shakira had reminded her of Janis Joplin. The year also saw her performing it alongside Melissa Etheridge on the ALMA Award; according to Joey Guerra of Houston Chronicle her English was imperfect but regardless it was pleasant to hear. The English version has never been officially released, but been included on an unofficial and fan made extended play, The Pepsi EP (2003). In 2000, “Inevitable” was recognized as an award-winning song at the Broadcast Music, Inc. (BMI) Latin Award.

== Legacy ==
In later years, “Inevitable” would garner warm responses from music critics, some of whom would consider it among her career’s bests. In 2005, Mariana Enriquez of Página 12 compared it to English rock band Radiohead’s “High and Dry” (1995). In 2020, Elle’s Natalia Chávez included “Inevitable” in her list of “Shakira’s 10 Old Songs that Still—Always—Make Us Cry”. During the commemoration of the 2021 Hispanic Heritage Month, Billboard published a list of 25 “timeless masterpieces” of the rock en español genre, in which “Inevitable” is included. In 2023, the song was described by Rolling Stone as one of her “best post-love songs”. The next year, a Billboard “Critic’s Picks” article analyzing her albums discography pointed out the lyrics “Siempre supe que es mejor cuando hay que hablar de dos empezar por uno mismo” (“I have always known that it is better to begin one by one when we need to talk”) as “demonstrating her wisdom beyond her years”.

Retrospective critics have also equally positive of the music video. Rolling Stone and Time included it in their lists of Shakira’s best music videos, the latter of which wrote, “Her presence in the video shows how comfortable she is in her musical element, early evidence that her rise to international stardom was, to borrow from the song, inevitable.” According to Gil Camargo of Time Out, Shakira “has delved into our feelings and capture them” in what he called “one of the most emblematic videos”.

"Inevitable" was included on the set list for the following tours: Tour Anfibio (2000), Tour of the Mongoose (2002–2003), Oral Fixation Tour (2006-2007), The Sun Comes Out World Tour (2010-2011) and El Dorado World Tour (2018). In August 1999, Shakira sang an acoustic version of "Inevitable" during an episode of MTV Unplugged in New York City. The performance has been included on her first live album, MTV Unplugged (2000). Spanish footballer and Shakira’s former boyfriend Gerard Piqué has considered “Inevitable” to be one of his favorite songs.

== Formats and track listings ==
Mexican CD single

1. "Inevitable" (Soft Final Ballad) – 3:06
2. "Inevitable" (Space Vocal Soft Final Ballad) – 3:07
3. "Inevitable" (Final Heavy Mix) – 3:08
4. "Inevitable" (Final Extended Heavy Mix) – 6:53
5. "Inevitable" (Final Smokin Dub Mix) – 7:49
6. "Inevitable" (Final Ambient Mix) – 7:15

== Charts ==
=== Weekly charts ===
Chart (1999)	Peak position
Costa Rica (Notimex)	2
El Salvador (Notimex)	2
Guatemala (Notimex)	1
Nicaragua (Notimex)	2
Panama (Notimex)	1
US Hot Latin Songs (Billboard)	3
US Latin Pop Airplay (Billboard)	2

Weekly chart performance for "Inevitable"
Chart (2025)	Peak position
Argentina Hot 100 (Billboard)	72

=== Year-end charts ===
Chart (1999)	Peak position
US Hot Latin Songs (Billboard)	37
US Latin Pop Songs (Billboard)	14

== Certifications ==
Certifications for "Inevitable"
Region	Certification	Certified units/sales
Mexico (AMPROFON)	3× Diamond	900,000^{‡}
Spain (Promusicae)	Platinum	60,000^{‡}
^{‡} Sales+streaming figures based on certification alone.
