= No Creo =

- Artwork used for the Pablos Flores remixes maxi single

Single by Shakira

from the album Dónde Están los Ladrones?
- Released: 17 February 1999
- Recorded: 1998
- Studio: Crescent Moon Studios (Miami, Florida)
- Genre: Rock en español
- Length: 3:50
- Label: Sony Colombia
- Composers: Shakira Mebarak; Luis F. Ochoa
- Lyricist: Shakira Mebarak
- Producers: Shakira; Luis Fernando Ochoa

Shakira singles chronology
"Inevitable" (1998)	"No Creo" (1999)	"Ojos Así" (1999)

Music video
- "No Creo" on YouTube

"No Creo" (transl. "I Don't Believe") is a song written and performed by the Colombian singer-songwriter Shakira. The song was released as the fourth single - although initially intended to be the lead, from her multi-platinum album Dónde Están los Ladrones? (1998) and later from her acoustic performance of the song on the MTV show Unplugged (2000). In the song, the singer expresses how she believes in nothing and nobody except her lover. The song references both accepted or contested figures, concepts, and beliefs, including herself, luck, Karl Marx, Jean-Paul Sartre, Mars and Venus, and Brian Weiss.

== Composition ==
In the lyrics of "No Creo" Shakira expresses how she doesn't believe in a variety of things, not even in her own self, and how the one thing she truly believes in is her love, since he's the only one who truly understands her.

== Music video ==
The video was directed by Gustavo Garzón and begins in a room, where Shakira jumps out of a window into a grassland where eccentric people are present. She scratches the ceiling of a room, goes through dark rooms, riots, swims through a washing room. A brief scene of the video is played on a screen in the music video for "Ciega, Sordomuda", which sparked speculation that some scenes were shot back-to-back with "Ciega, Sordomuda". It was later confirmed that although "No Creo" was originally intended to be the first single from the album, Sony decided that "Ciega, Sordomuda" would be a better opener of the album cycle.

== Formats and track listings ==
Spanish Maxi CD

No.	Title	Length
1.	"No Creo" (G-Vô Club Mix)	6:20
2.	"No Creo" (Pablo Flores Club 12" Remix)	9:42
3.	"No Creo" (Pablo Flores Radio Edit)	4:44
4.	"No Creo" (Pablo Flores Dub Mix)	7:27
5.	"No Creo" (LP Version)	3:53

== Charts ==
Chart (1999–2000)	Peak position
Guatemala (Notimex)	2
Honduras (EFE)	8
Uruguay (EFE)	1
US Hot Latin Songs (Billboard)	9
US Latin Pop Airplay (Billboard)	2
