= Dónde Están los Ladrones? (song) =

- Artwork for the Mexican promotional CD single

Promotional single by Shakira

from the album Dónde Están los Ladrones?
- Released: 16 October 1998
- Recorded: 1998
- Genre: Latin pop; Latin rock
- Length: 3:14
- Label: Sony Colombia
- Songwriters: Shakira; Luis Fernando Ochoa
- Producers: Shakira; Luis Fernando Ochoa

Shakira promotional singles chronology
"Quiero" (1996)	"Dónde Están los Ladrones?" (1998)	"Octavo Día" (1999)

Audio video
- "Dónde Están los Ladrones?" on YouTube

"Dónde Están los Ladrones?" (English: ”Where Are the Thieves?”) is a song written and performed by Colombian singer-songwriter Shakira. It was released as the first promotional single from her fourth studio album of the same name, while a live version of song off her first live album MTV Unplugged was also released as a promotional single with physical CDs in Brazil, Mexico and the US. A Latin rock song written and produced by Shakira and Luis Fernando Ochoa, it has socially charged lyrics about thieves.

== Background ==
"Dónde Están los Ladrones?" was inspired by an incident that happened to Shakira in Bogotá, Colombia, where her luggage was stolen while she was promoting her music. Inside her suitcase were lyrics and sheet music for a new album that were worked on up to that point. Shakira, alongside her team, security agencies, and record label, exhausted every method to recover the suitcase, including announcing about the robbery and offering rewards. The attempts failed, forcing Shakira and her musicians to piece together what was stolen from memory.

With everything lost, Shakira was left with a writer's block for a couple of years after releasing her album Pies Descalzos (1995). She ultimately was inspired to start the album over again and create new songs, thus leading to the creation of Dónde Están los Ladrones? (1998). It took almost nine months to produce it, and featured on the album is the title track "Dónde Están los Ladrones?". In an interview with Turkish magazine Blue Jean in 1999, it was explained that the title was dedicated to men who are the greatest thieves in the world, those who steal the hearts of women and leave.

== Composition ==
"In this burning Rome, how do you know who the Christians are and who the lions are? There are hooded thieves and others with white collars. There are those who steal hearts and those who rob banks. In this burning Rome of lions and Christians, they crucify the good and reward the bad." (Note: Translated from Spanish: "En esta Roma incendiada, ¿cómo se reconocen cuáles son los cristianos y cuáles son los leones? Hay ladrones de capucha y otros de cuello blanco. Hay quien roba corazones y hay quienes roban bancos. En esta Roma incendiada de leones y cristianos crucifican a los buenos y recompensan a los malos.")

— Shakira, Tour of the Mongoose interlude before performing "Dónde Están los Ladrones?".

"Dónde Están los Ladrones?" is a rock song. The song is lyrically critical and sharp-edged, thematically addressing harsh the social realities and political corruption of Colombia in the late 1990s in the form of questions. It criticizes powerful people who manipulate society for their own gain, stealing money, time, and feelings, while creating injustice and corruption, and has been seen as a message of hope that encourages people to keep striving for a better world.

The song is emblematic to when Shakira's suitcase with her music was stolen, but steers to a different direction having lyrics about unspecified thieves: "¿Dónde están los ladrones? / ¿Dónde está el asesino? / Quizá, allá, revolcándose en el patio del vecino" (English: Where are the thieves? / Where is the murderer? / Maybe, over there, rolling around in the neighbor's yard). The lyrics also inisuate self-guilt and collective guilt in injusticies: "¿Y qué pasa si son ellos? ¿Y qué pasa si soy yo?" (English: "What if it's them? What if it's me?)

== Live performances ==
"Dónde Están los Ladrones?" has been performed in multiple concerts and tours by Shakira, including Tour Anfibio, MTV Unplugged, and Tour of the Mongoose. During her performances of the song at concerts in Colombia in 1998, audiences collectively responded with shouts of "¡En el congreso!" (English: "In the congress!"). This occurred as Ernesto Samper Pizano’s turbulent presidency, marred by the Proceso 8000 legal investigation accusing him of accepting drug trafficking funds for his campaign, was concluding. At a time when Colombia was grappling with the aftermath of the Cali Cartel and Medellín Cartel's conflict, public attention was sharply fixed on political corruption, fueling the song’s resonance.

== Track listings ==
CD single: Dónde Están los Ladrones

1. "Dónde Están los Ladrones" - MTV Unplugged - 3:33

CD single: Dónde Están los Ladrones

1. "Dónde Están los Ladrones" - En Vivo - 3:33
2. "Dónde Están los Ladrones" - Dance Mix (Roy Tavare Fugitive Version) - 4:26
3. "Dónde Están los Ladrones" - Bailad Mix (Roy Tavare Lounge Version) - 3:32
4. "Dónde Están los Ladrones" - Tropical Mix (Roy Tavare Miami Version) - 4:10

CD single: Dónde Están los Ladrones

1. "Dónde Están los Ladrones" (En Vivo) - 3:33
2. "Dónde Están los Ladrones" - 3:14
3. "Dónde Están los Ladrones" (Roy Tavaré Fugitive Version) - 4:26
4. "Dónde Están los Ladrones" (Roy Tavaré Lounge Version) - 3:32
5. "Dónde Están los Ladrones" (Roy Tavaré Miami Version) - 4:10
