= Dónde Están los Ladrones? =

Studio album by Shakira
- Released: 25 September 1998
- Recorded: 1998
- Studios: Crescent Moon Studios; Criteria Recording Studios (Miami, Florida)
- Genres: Rock; alt rock; Latin rock; Latin pop; dance-rock
- Length: 41:06
- Languages: Spanish; Arabic
- Label: Sony Music Entertainment (Colombia)
- Producer: Shakira Mebarak

Shakira chronology
The Remixes (1997)	Dónde Están los Ladrones? (1998)	MTV Unplugged (2000)

Singles from Dónde están los ladrones?
- 1. "Ciega, Sordomuda" Released: 7 September 1998; 2. "Tú" Released: 2 November 1998; 3. "Inevitable" Released: 15 December 1998; 4. "No Creo" Released: 7 February 1999; 5. "Ojos Así" Released: 23 July 1999; 6. "Moscas en la Casa" Released: 10 December 1999

Dónde Están los Ladrones? (Spanish: [ˈdonde esˈtan los laˈðɾones]; transl. Where Are the Thieves?) is the fourth studio album by Colombian singer-songwriter Shakira, released on 25 September 1998 by Sony Music Colombia. After attaining success in Latin America with her major international debut, Pies Descalzos (1995), Shakira met producer Emilio Estefan, who identified her potential to break into the U.S. Latin market and became her manager. For work on the new album, Shakira also enlisted her previous collaborator Luis Fernando Ochoa, along with Lester Mendez, Javier Garza, Pablo Flores and Estéfano Salgado. Dónde Están los Ladrones? is stylistically Latin rock; it incorporates Latin pop elements and influences of Middle Eastern music.

Upon its release, Dónde Están los Ladrones? received positive reviews from music critics, who praised its sound and lyrics; Shakira was sometimes compared to Alanis Morissette. Commercially, the album was a success, selling over one million copies within its first month of release. It peaked at number 131 on the U.S. Billboard 200 and topped Billboard's Top Latin and Latin Pop Albums charts. The album received numerous record certifications in various countries, including a platinum certification in the United States and a triple-platinum certification in Shakira's native Colombia. Dónde Están los Ladrones? won several accolades and was nominated for Grammy Award for Best Latin Rock/Alternative Performance at the 41st Grammy Awards. In 2020, it was ranked number 496 by Rolling Stone on its 500 Greatest Albums of All Time.

Six singles were released from Dónde Están los Ladrones?. Its lead single, "Ciega, Sordomuda", reached the top of both Billboard's Hot Latin and Latin Pop Songs component charts, and also reached number one on charts of countries in Central America and Venezuela. Follow-up singles "Tú", "Inevitable", "No Creo", "Ojos Así" and "Moscas en la Casa" also debuted high on the charts. The album was promoted through several televised performances, including her debut on American television through The Rosie O'Donnell Show. In August 1999, Shakira gave an acoustic MTV Unplugged concert in New York City, which resulted in the live MTV Unplugged album. Her second tour, Tour Anfibio, visited South and North America in March–May 2000 and promoted both records.

== Background and development ==
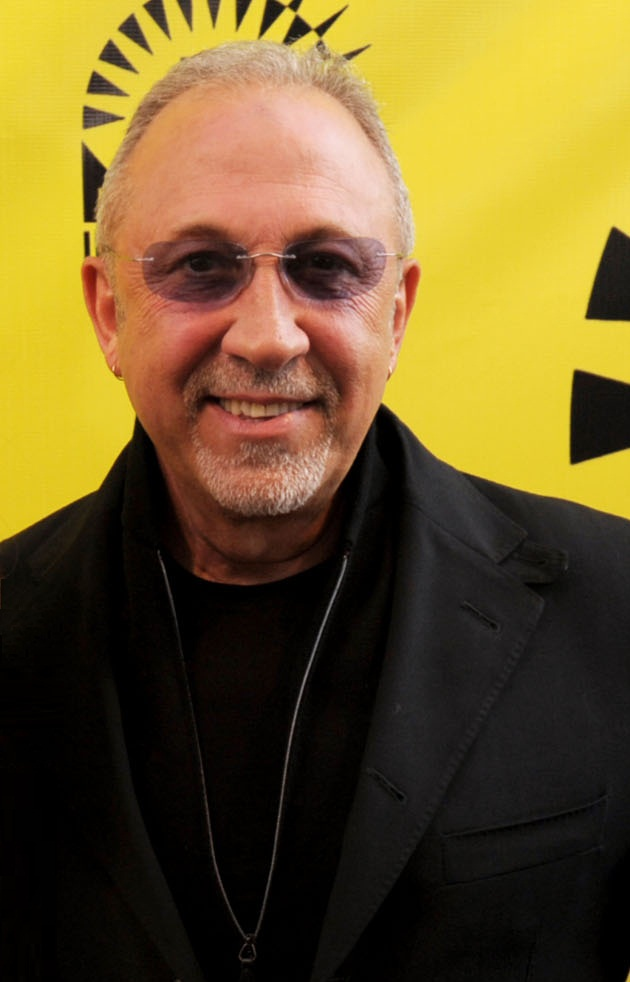
Emilio Estefan was Shakira's manager and executive producer for the album

After she rose to prominence with the success of her Pies Descalzos album (1995), Shakira was introduced to Emilio Estefan, the most important producer in the U.S. Latin music market at the time, by her promoter and longtime friend, Jairo Martínez. Estefan was renowned for launching the careers of several Hispanic singers, including Enrique Iglesias, Thalía, and his wife Gloria Estefan. The Estefans recognized early Shakira's potential and helped her break into the U.S. music market. One of Shakira's concerns about working with Emilio Estefan was creative control over her music. Before signing their contract, the roles and duties were defined: Estefan would be her manager and executive producer, but she would be in charge of all material and arrangements and have final approval over her records. She later stated about Estefan, "He had a great respect for me as an artist and trusted me totally on this project". They worked on the new album at Estefan's Crescent Moon Studios in Miami, where Shakira now lived and where Sony Music officially launched and promoted the record on 25 September 1998.

Having been labeled a major music phenomenon and having become an international youth idol after the Pies Descalzos success, Shakira was mindful of the many who would judge her based on her fourth studio album. She knew that some would say that "she had changed too much" and others would reproach her if she remained the same. "All I could do was to be myself. I understood that all I had to do was write the music I knew how to write and to write from the heart when I was compelled to. In that way, everything developed naturally, more so than I could have imagined", she said. Being a perfectionist, she worked on the material to the point of exhaustion. "I made two or three demos of each song. I became a human being so demanding of myself that until the song made my hair stand on end, I wouldn't stop". Shakira was passionate for her profession; she realized that fame had not changed her as a person and she needed to continue with her personal artistic style, allowing change in form, but not in substance of her music. Equipment for the recording of Dónde Están los Ladrones? included old amplifiers to achieve a better sound, a 40-year-old German microphone, and several innovations in the instrumental mixes. The album took nine months to produce and more people worked on it than on Pies Descalzos, where all songwriting was done by Shakira and Ochoa and all production by Ochoa and Shakira. She commented, "To me it's a normal time, the gestation period for a baby. But many people wag their finger and tell me that the next one cannot take so long..."

== Title and artwork ==
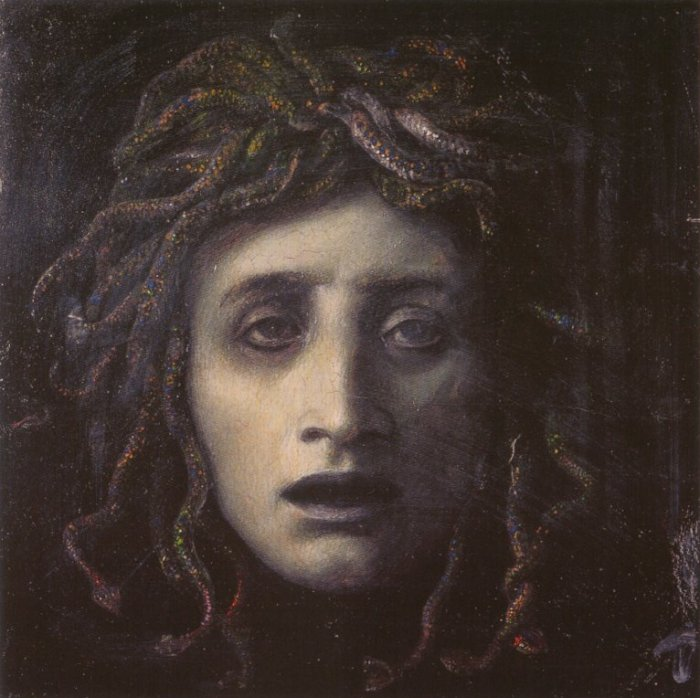
Shakira's hair on the album cover was compared to that of Medusa

The album's title was inspired by an incident in Bogotá. At the El Dorado International Airport, during her Tour Pies Descalzos, a briefcase that contained all the lyrics Shakira had been working on for the next album was stolen; the songs had to be rewritten. She commented, "The worst part about the whole thing was that I couldn't remember them because of the mental block that can be caused by such a traumatic experience as the robbery of such a personal item". She was overcome by feelings of impotence and emptiness and for a couple of days could think of nothing but the people who had taken her material: "Who are they? What were they looking for? Where are they?". She searched for a reason behind the theft of her songs. "I came to the conclusion that there are all types of thieves. A thief is not just a person who takes a physical object that doesn't belong to him or her. There are thieves who steal feelings, space, time, dreams, rights", she explained.

The album's title also evolved into a reference to political corruption and general social mistrust pervading contemporary Colombian society. The cover features a photo of Shakira with her hands soot-covered, as if caught with her hands dirty. She explained: "from that point of view, we all have stolen at one time or another, myself included. The dirty hands represent the shared guilt. No one is completely clean, in the end we are all accomplices". In keeping with her "rockera" style, the cover shows her hair loose and messy and filled up with little colorful braids, looking like a "modern Medusa", according to biographer Ximena Diego. Because of the album's popularity, girls from various countries copied Shakira's style, colorfully braiding their hair and wearing friendship bracelets.

== Composition ==
"For me, singing about the manifestations of love is inevitable. That marvelous feeling that seduces us into a hypnotic trance, like in 'Ciega sordomuda', or forces us to give up everything, like in 'Tú', makes us believe solely in the person we love, as in 'No creo', makes it difficult for us to forget, as in 'Sombra de ti'... But my songs include social views as well. That is the case in 'Octavo día' and 'Dónde están los ladrones?' which, with a dose of humor or irony, question certain attitudes that we frequently see".

— Shakira about the songs on the album

Dónde Están los Ladrones? consists of Latin rock and Latin pop styles. In a 2026 Boston Herald article, Jed Gottlieb advises the reader to spin the record to hear Shakira's alt rock roots. The album opens with "Ciega, Sordomuda", which utilizes mariachi Mexican trumpets over a disco dance loop and an electric guitar. In "Si Te Vas", the angry Shakira tells her lover "if you leave and change me for that witch, piece of skin, don't come back anymore" (she'll quit him once she strips him of his last pennies, the singer warns). "Moscas en la Casa" was inspired by Shakira's relationship with Puerto Rican actor Osvaldo Ríos. She expresses the sadness that she feels after the partner's departure, still waiting for his return. In "No Creo", Shakira cheerfully declares that she believes in nothing and nobody except for her friend, his kisses and everything he says. Among the gods, personalities and factors she does not believe in are Venus, Mars, Karl Marx, Jean-Paul Sartre, Brian Weiss, luck, and even herself. The fifth song on Dónde Están los Ladrones? is "Inevitable". In the dramatic hard rock ballad, the self-critical Shakira finds it inevitable that she keeps loving her partner who is gone, but struggles to figure out what to do with herself. "Octavo Día" is a rock song with satirical lyrics. God comes to Earth after finishing his work, discovers everything to be in ruins, and hopelessly tries to live as an ordinary man, unemployed and lonely. She namechecks Michael Jackson, Bill Clinton and Tarzan as idols left for humanity to worship if God decides to abandon his creation.

"Ojos Así"
A sample of "Ojos Así" incorporates a Middle Eastern rhythm

The lost love poetry of "Que Vuelvas" was inspired by Shakira's relationship with Ríos. It was musically compared to her 1995 song "Estoy Aquí". In "Tú", "one of the best Latin love songs of all time", she lyrically expresses the enchantment and power of love. The ninth track is the guitar-driven "Dónde Están los Ladrones?", where Shakira utilizes her reflections brought about by her stolen luggage incident to criticize the theft, murder and negative aspects of political and social reality in South American nations. She sees "the thieves" most everywhere, does not exclude herself ("and what if it's me ... the one who sings this song"), but refers specifically to corrupt practices of the ruling elites. In "Sombra de Ti", she is overwhelmed by painful memories of a past love. The album's closing "mega-hit" "Ojos Así" is accompanied by a Middle Eastern rhythm and contains a verse in Arabic. The singer laments that even though she has traveled from Bahrain to Beirut and from the North to South Pole, she has never found eyes like those of the object of her desire, without which she cannot now live.

== Singles ==
"Ciega, Sordomuda" was released on 7 September 1998 as the album's lead single. It reached number one on Colombian radio in a record time of less than a week after its release. It also reached number one on charts of the United States, countries in Central America and Venezuela. In the song's music video, Shakira is arrested in an unprovoked police attack, along with many other street-partying people. She escapes with the help of her boyfriend dressed as a policeman (the police are also shown surrealistically as robots in police uniforms). Shakira hides in a wig store, pretending to be a mannequin, and drives a car blindfolded while the whole city searches for her, blindfolded as well. The video was directed by Gustavo Garzón. It was nominated for a Lo Nuestro Award for Video of the Year in 1999. "Tú" was selected as the second single from the album. It repeated the success of the previous one, reaching the top positions on both the U.S. Billboard Latin Pop Songs and Hot Latin Songs charts. Its black-and-white music video was directed by Emilio Estefan in Orlando, Florida. "Inevitable" was released as the album's third single. In the music video directed by Garzón, Shakira sings the song to an audience in a circular stage. The single reached numbers two and three on the U.S. Latin Pop Songs and Hot Latin Songs charts.

"No Creo" was released as the fourth single from Dónde Están los Ladrones?, and was also a commercial success, reaching numbers two and nine on the U.S. Latin Pop Songs and Hot Latin Songs charts, respectively. The song's video was directed by Garzón. "Ojos Así" was released as the album's fifth single. The track reached numbers nine and twenty-two on the U.S. Latin Pop Songs and Hot Latin Songs component charts. The music video for "Ojos Así" features Shakira performing the song for a festive, dancing crowd, with a giant neon eye in the background, which shoots out sparks and catches fire towards the end of the video. There are also scenes of Shakira belly dancing in front of a dark purple background, with snakes painted down her arms and red lines painted on her head. The video won the International Viewer's Choice Award (North) at the 2000 MTV Video Music Awards, while it was also nominated for the same award in the South category and for a Latin Grammy Award for Best Short Form Music Video. "Moscas en la Casa" was released as the sixth single. It peaked at numbers ten and twenty-five on the U.S. Latin Pop Songs and Hot Latin Songs charts, respectively.

== Critical reception ==
Professional ratings
Review scores
Source	Rating
AllMusic	5/5 stars
Billboard	favorable
Latin Beat Magazine	mixed
Sputnikmusic	4/5 stars
The New Rolling Stone Album Guide	4/5 stars

Dónde Están los Ladrones? received critical acclaim from music critics. Alex Henderson from AllMusic gave the album five stars out of five, saying that it was "arguably the finest and most essential album that she recorded in the 1990s". Besides "poetic" lyrics, the "superb CD" would impress even non-Spanish-speaking listeners with its "attractive melodies and the emotion that the artist brings to her songs". He finds the second major international production of the "superstar in Latin America" to be "musically exciting". Billboard magazine was also positive and called it a "like-minded set brimming with forlorn, lovesick testimonials set to a mainstream pop/rock sound laced occasionally with edgy guitar and vocal interludes", picking the song "Ojos Así" as the "most satisfying" track on the album. Christopher John Farley wrote positively of Dónde Están los Ladrones? in his Time magazine review: "The fuss over Shakira is justified. On her latest CD she charges Latin pop with rock 'n' roll to thrilling effect. Even when her music gets loud, Shakira's vibrant contralto remains sweet and expressive." "Missing out on this collection would be at least a misdemeanor", he concluded. Mark Kemp, writing for the book The New Rolling Stone Album Guide, said that the album mined familiar territory in Shakira's music, but it "holds together with stronger songs, a beefier sound, and more confident vocals". To him, it was "hard to imagine a singer barely into her 20s having written and recorded such an inventive set of songs".

According to the reviewer from MTV, "This album finds the charismatic songstress combining traditional Latin roots (represented by the occasional acoustic touches) with post-Alanis angry-young-woman sensibilities, Sheryl Crow-esque pop eclecticism and an electrifying rock & roll rhythm. Those expecting polite recreations of Latin styles past will be sorely disappointed, but listeners for whom crossover is the norm will find a wealth of satisfaction in Dónde Están los Ladrones?, whether or not they understand the words". Leila Cobo Hanlon from Miami Herald was positive, saying that the album "retains Shakira's trademark sound — rock-laced pop melodies backed by acoustic guitars — as well as her deeply personal approach to music-making". As she saw it, "the album's only failures occur when it looks too closely at its predecessor". Sputnikmusic website wrote that the record is "on the verge of being spectacular", "the gem of Shakira's discography, and one of the best Spanish pop releases of the past decade", although it criticized its "slight lack of variety". Franz Reynold from Latin Beat Magazine noted that "while many of the cuts on this collection are definitely chart-bound, that is due more to the fact that she doesn't stray too far from the previous formula, than it does to any hope that success provides room for expansion", but complimented tracks like "Inevitable" and "Tú". Rubens Herbst from Brazilian newspaper A Notícia gave a mixed review, writing that the album was "homogeneous, well-produced and full of potential hits", however "competent but empty and forgettable". He noted "Inevitable" as a song with "powerful melody and cool riff".

=== Lists ===
Critic/Publication	List	Rank	Ref.
Los 600 de Latinoamérica	600 discos 1920–2022	10	
Rolling Stone	The 100 Best Album Covers of All Time	82	
Rolling Stone	The 500 Greatest Albums of All Time	496	

=== Accolades ===
At the 41st Annual Grammy Awards in 1999, Dónde Están Los Ladrones? received a nomination for Best Latin Rock/Alternative Album. At the 11th Annual Lo Nuestro Awards in the same year, it won the Lo Nuestro Award for Pop Album of the Year in a tie with Sueños Líquidos by Maná. Also in 1999, at the Billboard Latin Music Awards, it won Pop Album of the Year by a Female Artist, and El Premio de la Gente for Female Pop Artist or Group at the Ritmo Latino Music Awards. The record won in the category of Best Pop Album by a Female Artist at the 1999 Premios Globo. It was recognized as Latin Album of the Year at the 2000 Premios Gardel. In the updated 500 Greatest Albums of All Time published in 2020 by Rolling Stone, it ranked at number 496 as the only rock en español on the list and was described as a "stellar globetrotting dance-rock set, which blends sounds from Colombia, Mexico, and her father's native Lebanon."

== Commercial performance ==
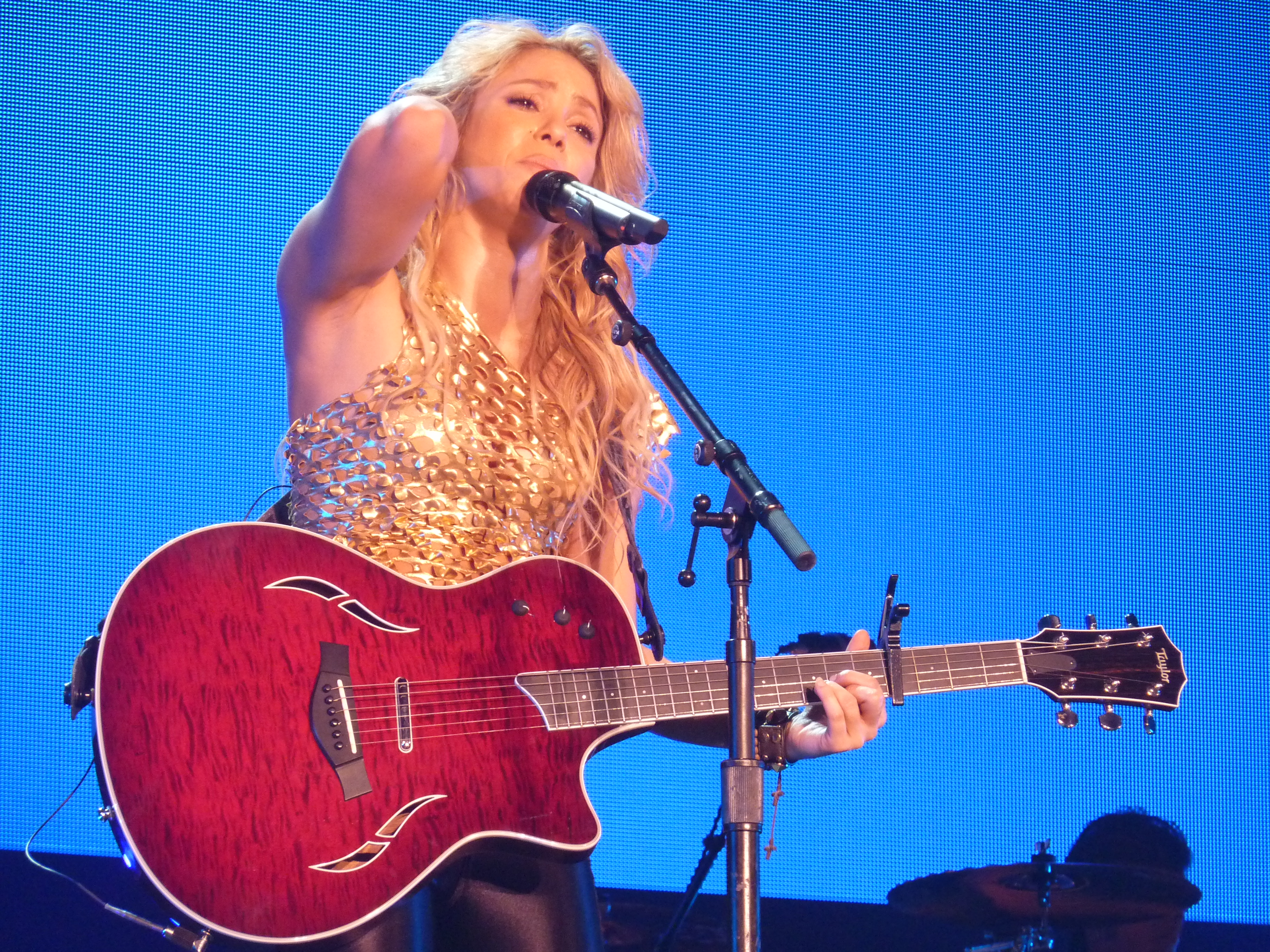
Shakira performing album track "Inevitable" on The Sun Comes Out World Tour (2011)

Dónde Están los Ladrones? sold 300,000 copies on the day of its release, and over one million copies by the end of its first month of release. On the U.S. Billboard 200, the album debuted at number 141 for the week dated 17 October 1998, selling 10,500 units; the next week it climbed to number 131, its peak. It reached number one on Billboard Top Latin Albums, Latin Pop Albums, and number 30 on Catalog Albums component charts. By December 1998, it had reached 500,000 copies sold in the United States and 1.5 million worldwide. On 23 December 1999, it was certified platinum by the Recording Industry Association of America (RIAA). As of October 2017, over 920,000 copies were sold in the U.S., making it the ninth bestselling Latin album in the country, according to Nielsen SoundScan. Across Europe, Dónde Están los Ladrones? made appearances at the lower ranges of Top 100 album charts.

In Hispanic countries, the album was a success. In Shakira's native Colombia, it was certified triple-platinum by the Asociación Colombiana de Productores de Fonogramas (ASINCOL), after selling 180,000 copies. It was also certified triple-platinum in Chile and Venezuela, double-platinum in Mexico and Uruguay, quadruple-platinum in Argentina, and platinum in Spain. According to different sources, Dónde Están los Ladrones? sold 4 million or even 8 million copies worldwide.

== Legacy ==
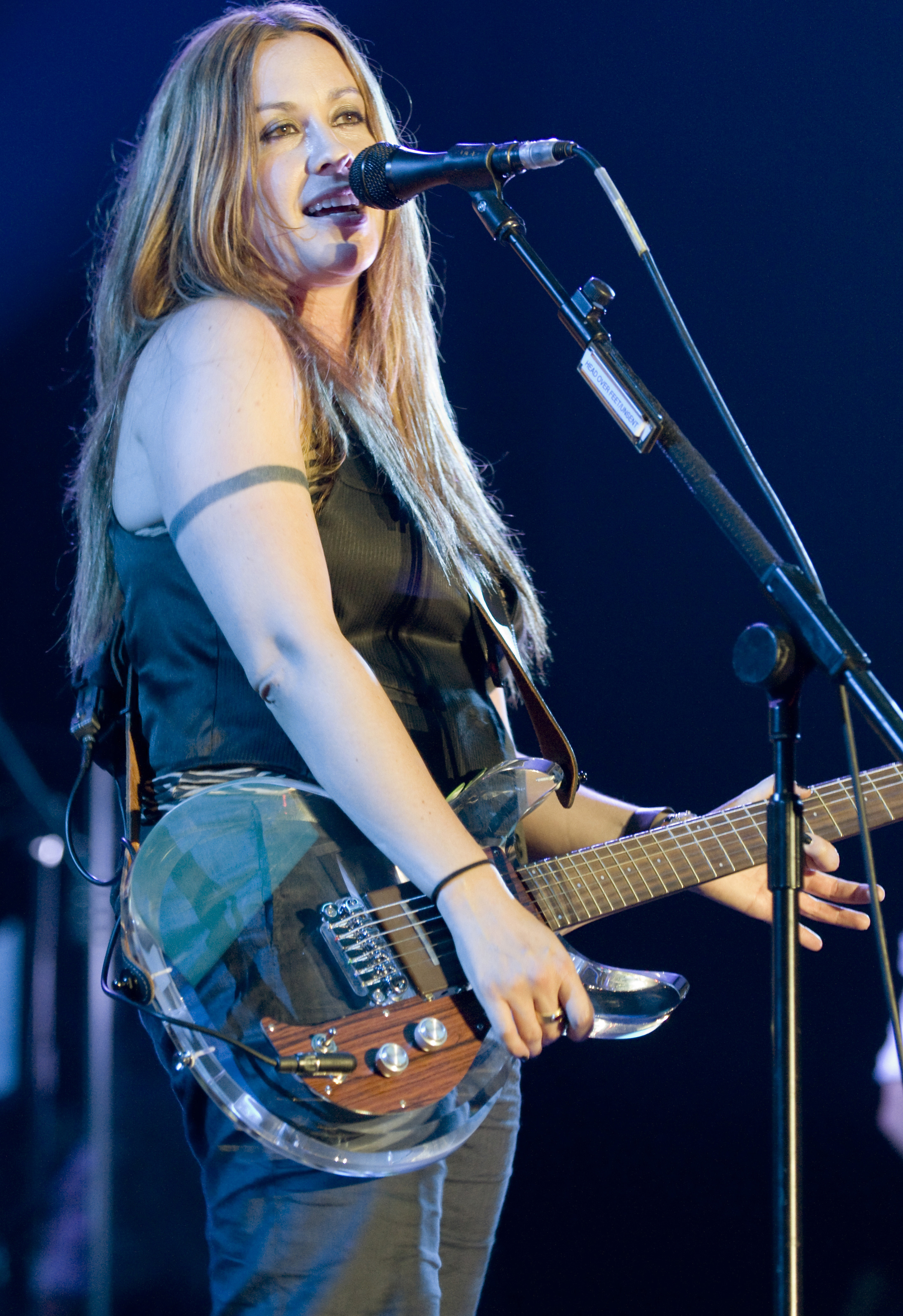
Shakira was compared to Canadian singer Alanis Morissette due to the similarity of their looks and artistic expressions

According to music journalist Sebastián Peña from Shock magazine, the record was intended to surpass the success, quality, and attention that Shakira had achieved with her previous album, something that she undoubtedly accomplished. He stressed that she dared to do something that very few artists of that time had done for fear of not being played on the radio, making statements, criticizing the corrupt and those who live their lives superficially, achieving, in her lyrics, revolutionary effects. While other Latin artists, such as Carolina Sabino, were taking off, none managed to transcend with a well-established fan base, something that Shakira did. She was also credited with opening doors for women in the industry and showing to people that she could be a "superhero" for men as well as women, even though female Latin artists had in the past been routinely kept in the background. She was seen by some in the media as the Latin Alanis Morissette, due to the similarity of their ways of expressing themselves and their visual proposals. With this album, Shakira gave greater strength and visibility to the international female performer boom at the end of the century. The record caused her to be dubbed "the princess of rock" by Time magazine and to be described as "the Colombian artist of the millennium" in her country.

According to Ximena Diego's book Shakira: Woman Full of Grace, Shakira's style on the album, and on the "Ciega, Sordomuda" video in particular, became a trend for young women, with teenage girls imitating the singer's outfit and accessories. Thousands of letters reached her from fans, and her music was heard in children's toys. Because of her, Latin music was taken to distant cultures in Europe and Asia. Rolling Stone credited 21-year-old Shakira with redefining Latin music with her last two albums, Dónde Están los Ladrones? being the one in which she "created a bold, female-led pop-rock style that stood out from the male-dominated balladry that was all over Latin radio in the nineties" and that "set her up for massive global fame". Shakira was introduced to the wider American public and became a household name in Latin rock. According to the magazine, she was committed to "making the music sound exactly how she heard it in her head". Francisca Valenzuela and Jessie Reyez explained in interviews how Shakira's "frank and witty lyrics" of love and heartbreak inspired other female artists to write their own "unapologetic" songs.

In a 2021 feminist media survey report, Dónde Están los Ladrones? was seen as the most important Spanish-language album by a Latin American artist in history. About 50 Latin music industry women and LGBT people from a number of countries participated in the survey. The album made Shakira the most influential female artist for them (her track record was considered together with Pies Descalzos). During the 1990s, the "rockera" was a daring and groundbreaking author and performer with the image of an ordinary Latin American girl, which was soon to acquire a somewhat different quality when she transformed more into a global pop star. The professional women in the report developed strong personal identifications with Shakira of the 1990s, then intensely disliked her "crossover" and blonde hair, but with time her legacy and profound impact had become self-evident to them.

Dónde Están los Ladrones? was a benchmark for the younger generation of Latin artists. Sebastián Yatra and Camilo have cited it as a point of inspiration for their musical works. In July 2017, it ranked at number 95 among the 150 greatest female albums of all time by the National Public Radio. It was also included as one of the "1000 Recordings You Must Hear Before You Die" by Sony Music. In 2024, a group of music journalists from across Latin America ranked the record tenth on their list of "600 essential albums for the history of Latin America." In 2024, Rolling Stone placed its cover at number 82 of the "100 greatest album covers of all time."

== Promotion ==
Promotion for Dónde Están los Ladrones? began in September 1998, when Shakira performed the album's lead single "Ciega, Sordomuda" on the Con T de Tarde show in Spain. In October, she was featured in many TV programs in Brazil, including two appearances on Domingo Legal (SBT). On 28 January 1999, she made her debut on American television by appearing on The Rosie O'Donnell Show. Gloria Estefan introduced and interviewed the singer instead of O'Donnell, before Shakira performed an English version of "Inevitable" (she sang it while suffering from fever due to nervousness). In February 1999, she went to Peru to perform on Laura TV show. She also sang "Inevitable" in a medley with "Come to My Window" with Melissa Etheridge on the ALMA Awards, on 6 March 1999. Shakira returned to Brazil in March 1999 and performed on several TV shows, such as Domingão do Faustão. In May, she returned to the United States, to perform at the Premio Lo Nuestro 1999 in Miami and at the Cinco de Mayo Festival in Los Angeles. In November, Shakira sang at the Premios Amigo in Spain. Also in November, her show officially closed the Miss Colombia 1999 election in Cartagena.

To promote Dónde Están los Ladrones? and MTV Unplugged, Shakira embarked on the Tour Anfibio, which began in March and ended in May 2000. The tour was sponsored by Nokia. The name "anfibio" (amphibian) was chosen by Shakira because she thought it represented her own characteristics: earthy, viscerally connected to the water element, capable of adapting and undergoing metamorphosis. Before the tour, she predicted a transformed artistic personality: "It has nothing to do with past performances. You will see an evolved and renewed Shakira". The tour's setlist consisted of songs from her albums Pies Descalzos and Dónde Están los Ladrones? In addition, she included an a cappella song, "Alfonsina y el Mar", originally by Argentine folk singer Mercedes Sosa. Criticism of the tour included high ticket prices, overselling of tickets in Guatemala, which, according to the press, could have caused a tragedy, long delays at the start of the show, and the accusation of the use of pre-recorded music in Puerto Rico. Tour Anfibio lasted for a short period of time and comprised few concerts in comparison with Shakira's first Tour Pies Descalzos. She may have been in a hurry to get on with her next studio album project; she said in March 2000 that she would be going to the Bahamas to start recording as soon as she was done with the present tour. The tour was still a financial success, earning her a position in the list of Top 50 Tours published in the summer of 2000 by Pollstar magazine. Shakira performed "Ojos Así" on the first-ever Latin Grammy Awards on 13 September 2000 in Los Angeles, giving an "electrifying" and "wildly choreographed" performance, predicted to "expedite her breakthrough into the U.S." (music market), as the singer reported working on her first English-language album.

== Attempted English version ==
The success of Dónde Están los Ladrones? prompted Gloria Estefan to persuade Shakira to record the album in English. Estefan offered help with lyrics translation to make it possible for Shakira to "cross over" into the mainstream U.S. popular music industry. Shakira was hesitant to record songs in English as it was not her first language, but began translating "Ojos Así". However, she wanted to have full control over her music, so she decided to learn English better and write her own new songs in that language. She was supposed to return to the studio to record an English version of Dónde Están los Ladrones? in January 1999, but it did not come to fruition and a new album titled Laundry Service was eventually released instead as her first crossover album.

== Track listing ==
All lyrics are written by Shakira Mebarak R.

No.	Title	Music	Producer(s)	Length
1.	"Ciega, Sordomuda"	Mebarak; Estéfano Salgado	Mebarak; Lester Mendez	4:28
2.	"Si Te Vas"	Mebarak; Luis Fernando Ochoa	Mebarak; Ochoa	3:30
3.	"Moscas en la Casa"	Mebarak	Mebarak; Mendez	3:32
4.	"No Creo"	Mebarak; Ochoa	Mebarak; Ochoa	3:53
5.	"Inevitable"	Mebarak; Ochoa	Mebarak; Ochoa	3:13
6.	"Octavo Día"	Mebarak; Mendez	Mebarak; Mendez	4:32
7.	"Que Vuelvas"	Mebarak	Mebarak; Mendez	3:51
8.	"Tú"	Mebarak; Dillon O'Brian	Mebarak; Mendez	3:35
9.	"Dónde Están los Ladrones?"	Mebarak; Ochoa	Mebarak; Ochoa	3:14
10.	"Sombra de Ti"	Mebarak; Ochoa	Mebarak; Ochoa	3:35
11.	"Ojos Así"	Mebarak; Pablo Flores; Javier Garza	Mebarak; Flores; Garza	3:57

Japanese edition
No.	Title	Music	Length
12.	"Ciega, Sordomuda" (12" full mix)	Mebarak; Salgado	10:52
13.	"Ciega, Sordomuda" (Radio edit)	Mebarak; Salgado	4:37

German re-release edition bonus tracks
No.	Title	Music	Length
12.	"Estoy Aquí"	Mebarak; Ochoa	3:44
13.	"Ojos Así" (Single Version)	Mebarak; Flores; Garza	3:56

Indonesian cassette bonus tracks
No.	Title	Music	Length
12.	"Estoy Aquí" (Album version)	Mebarak; Ochoa	3:44
13.	"Estoy Aquí" (Love + Tears Mix)	Mebarak; Ochoa	5:07
14.	"Estoy Aquí" (Club Mix)	Mebarak; Ochoa	9:04

Mexican LP bonus tracks
No.	Title	Music	Length
12.	"Si Te Vas" (Live & off the Record)	Mebarak; Ochoa	4:36
13.	"Ciega, Sordomuda" (Live & off the Record)	Mebarak; Salgado	4:58
14.	"Ojos Así" (Thunder Mix Radio Edit)	Mebarak; Flores; Garza	3:52
15.	"Ciega, Sordomuda" (12" full mix)	Mebarak; Salgado	10:52
16.	"Estoy Aquí" (Extended Club Mix)	Mebarak; Ochoa	9:32

== Personnel ==
Credits are adapted from the liner notes of Dónde Están los Ladrones?

- Shakira – producer, songwriter, vocals, backing vocals, harmonica
- Emilio Estefan Jr. – executive producer
- Javier Garza – producer, engineer, mixer, programmer, songwriter
- Luis Fernando Ochoa – producer, songwriter, guitar, bass guitar, tambourine
- Lester Mendez – producer, songwriter, arrangements, string arrangements, programmer, keyboards
- Pablo Flores – producer, programmer, songwriter
- Sebastian Krys – engineer, mixer
- Bob Ludwig – mastering
- Adam Zimmon – guitar
- Marcelo Acevedo – guitar
- Randy Barlow – accordion
- Teddy Mulet – trumpet
- Brendan Buckley – drums, percussion
- Edwin Bonilla – percussion
- John Falcone – bass guitar
- Julio Hernández – bass guitar
- Claudio Spiewak – guitar
- Wendy Pedersen – backing vocals
- Tommy Anthony – backing vocals
- Nicolás Tovar – backing vocals
- Rita Quintero – backing vocals
- Nicole Yarling – backing vocals
- Nicolas W. Farhoury – backing vocals
- Oussamah Karaki – backing vocals
- Raúl Midon – backing vocals
- Ron Taylor – Hammond B-3, engineer
- Chris Glansdorp – cello
- Dan Warner – guitar
- A. J. Niilo – guitar
- Alan Kendal – steel pedal
- Lee Levin – drums
- Miriam Elli – percussion
- Joe Zaytoonian – oud
- Michelle Massad – oud
- Jack Stamates – violin
- Fadi Hardan – accordion, backing vocals
- Estéfano Salgado – songwriter
- Dillon O'Brian – songwriter
- Eric Shilling – engineer
- Joel Numa – engineer
- Marcelo Anez – engineer
- Marcelo Acevedo – engineer
- Paul Hoyle – engineer
- Felipe Álvarez – engineer
- Steve Meneses – assistant engineer
- Simon Ramone – assistant engineer
- Alfred Figueroa – assistant engineer
- Kieran Wagner – assistant engineer
- Chris Wiggins – assistant engineer
- Andy Pechenik – technical support
- José Maldonado – technical support
- Kevin Dillon – studio coordinator

== Charts ==
=== Weekly charts ===
Weekly chart performance for Dónde Están los Ladrones?
Chart (1998–2002)	Peak position
Argentine Albums (CAPIF)	1
German Albums (Offizielle Top 100)	79
Dutch Albums (Album Top 100)	78
Spanish Albums (AFYVE)	22
Swiss Albums (Schweizer Hitparade)	73
US Billboard 200	131
US Top Catalog Albums (Billboard)	30
US Heatseekers Albums (Billboard)	2
US Top Latin Albums (Billboard)	1
US Latin Pop Albums (Billboard)	1

Chart (2023)	Peak position
Spanish Albums (PROMUSICAE)	57

=== Year-end charts ===
1998 year-end chart performance for Dónde Están los Ladrones?
Chart (1998)	Peak position
US Top Latin Albums (Billboard)	18
US Latin Pop Albums (Billboard)	8

1999 year-end chart performance for Dónde Están los Ladrones?
Chart (1999)	Peak position
US Top Latin Albums (Billboard)	5
US Latin Pop Albums (Billboard)	4

== Certifications and sales ==
Certifications for Dónde Están los Ladrones?
Region	Certification	Certified units/sales
Argentina (CAPIF)	4× Platinum	365,000
Brazil	—	100,000
Chile	28× Platinum	100,000
Colombia Physical sales	4× Diamond	
Colombia Digital streams	Platinum+2× Gold	
Mexico (AMPROFON)	Diamond+Platinum+2× Gold	1,450,000^{‡}
Peru	Gold	
Spain (Promusicae)	Platinum	100,000^{^}
Turkey (Mü-Yap)	3× Platinum	
United States (RIAA)	Platinum	920,000
Uruguay (CUD)	2× Platinum	30,000
Venezuela	3× Platinum	159,351
Summaries
Central America (CFC)	4× Platinum	
^{^} Shipments figures based on certification alone.^{‡} Sales+streaming figures based on certification alone.

== See also ==
- 1998 in Latin music
- List of number-one Billboard Top Latin Albums from the 1990s
- List of number-one Billboard Latin Pop Albums from the 1990s
- List of best-selling albums in Argentina
- List of best-selling albums in Chile
- List of best-selling albums in Colombia
- List of best-selling albums in Mexico
- List of best-selling Latin albums
- List of best-selling Latin albums in the United States
