= Tú (Shakira song) =

- Mexican promotional CD single cover

Single by Shakira

from the album Dónde Están los Ladrones?
- Released: 1998
- Studio: Crescent Moon Studios, Miami, Florida
- Length: 3:36
- Label: Sony Music Colombia
- Composers: Shakira; Dillon O'Brian
- Lyricist: Shakira
- Producers: Shakira; Lester Méndez

Shakira singles chronology
"Ciega, Sordomuda" (1998)	"Tú" (1998)	"Inevitable" (1998)

Music video
- "Tú" on YouTube

"Tú" (transl. "You") is a song by Colombian singer-songwriter Shakira from her fourth studio album, Dónde Están los Ladrones? (1998). On the ballad, the lyrics detail the singer offering herself and her possessions to her lover. It was released as the album's second single in 1998 by Columbia Records and Sony Discos. Its lyrics were written by Shakira, the music was composed by herself and Dillon O'Brian. Shakira also handled its productions along with Lester Méndez. The track's musical composition was originally intended for an album O'Brian never released.

"Tú" received positive reactions from music critics, who praised Shakira's performance. The song was a recipient of a Broadcast Music, Inc. (BMI) Latin Award in 2000. An accompanying music video depicts Shakira performing various activities at a room. The song was included in the set list for the Tour Anfibio (2000), Tour of the Mongoose (2002–03), and El Dorado World Tour (2018). Shakira also performed an acoustic version of the song for her first live album, MTV Unplugged (2000). Commercially, the track topped the Billboard Hot Latin Songs and Latin Pop Airplay charts in the United States; it also became a number-one hit in Costa Rica, El Salvador, Guatemala, Nicaragua and Panama.

== Background ==
After rising to prominence with the success of her major-label debut album Pies Descalzos (1995), Shakira was introduced to Emilio Estefan, the most important producer in the Hispanic market at the time, by her promoter and longtime friend, Jairo Martínez. Estefan was renowned for launching the careers of several Hispanic singers, including Thalía and his wife Gloria Estefan. He decided to work with Shakira as he identified her potential to break into the US Latin market, though one of Shakira's concerns about working with Estefan was creative control over her music. Before signing their contract, the roles and duties were finalized: Estefan would be her manager and executive producer, but she would be in charge of all material and arrangements and have final approval over her records. She later stated about Estefan, "He had a great respect for me as an artist and trusted me totally on this project." Since then, they started working on Estefan's Crescent Moon Studios in Miami, Florida. She insisted on perfection, working on the material to the point of exhaustion. "I made two or three demos of each song. I became a human being so demanding of myself that until the song made my hair stand on end, I wouldn't stop".

Equipment for the recording of Dónde Están los Ladrones? included old amplifiers to achieve a better sound, a 40-year-old German microphone, and several innovations in the instrumental mixes. Dónde Están los Ladrones? took nine months to produce, more than Shakira's previous records since more people were involved on this album. Shakira commented, "To me it's a normal time, the gestation period for a baby. But many people wag their finger and tell me that the next one cannot take so long..." Shakira was involved with the compositions for all the tracks in the album, including "Tú".

== Composition ==
"Tú" was written by Shakira and composed by herself along with Dillon O'Brian. The production was handled by the singer and Lester Méndez. In an interview with Remezcla in 2018, O'Brian mentioned that he and Shakira tried different melodies at his piano, but she was not satisfied with the pitches. O'Brian then asked Shakira to play some of her records, which gave him inspiration. "I said, 'I think I know what you’re looking for,' and I sang a melody. Her eyes just lit up", O'Brian recalled. He previously composed the chorus's melody and chorus for an album of his that was never released O'Brian also recalled, "Her A&R guy, who was in the room, said, 'She thinks she has something that will work with this that she's already written', and that ended up being most of the lyrics of 'Tú'". Musically, "Tú" is a "steel guitar-flavored ballad". In the lyrics, Shakira "gifts" all of herself "from her waist to her diary." The singer chants: "I offer you my waist/And my lips should you want to kiss them/I offer you my madness/And the few neurons I have left".

== Promotion and reception ==
"Tú" was released as the album's second single to radio stations in various countries in 1998 by Columbia Records and Sony Discos.

"Tú" was included on the set list for the following tours: Tour Anfibio (2000), Tour of the Mongoose (2002–03), and El Dorado World Tour (2018). In August 1999, Shakira sang an acoustic version of "Tú" during an episode of MTV Unplugged in New York City. The performance was included on her first live album, MTV Unplugged (2000).

The Dallas Morning News critic Mario Tarradell stated that Shakira "ventures into orchestrated ballad territory with majestic results." In a mixed review for Dónde Están los Ladrones?, the Latin Beat Magazine's Franz Reynold cited "Tú" and "Inevitable" where "Shakira's naturally sad tones are employed to fine effect". The Los Angeles Times writer Ernesto Lechner notes the artist "showcasing her sly way of combining heartfelt sentiment with a trace of irony." In a retrospective review of the song in 2006, an editor for Latina magazine noted that while its lyrics might make the singer look like a "doormat for the guy", they declared it as a "gutsy, sensual move" as Shakira's voice "sells the message beautifully". "Tu" was listed among Billboard's "10 Shakira Songs That Prove She’s a Hopeless Romantic", and was later included on their list of "25 Latin Love Songs That Make Us Swoon" in 2020. On the former listed, Griselda Flores declared "Tú" to be "one of the best Latin love songs of all time". Commercially, "Tú" topped the Billboard Hot Latin Songs and Latin Pop Airplay charts in the US. It was acknowledged as an award-winning song at the 2000 BMI Latin Awards.

== Music video ==
The accompanying music video for "Tú" was directed by Shakira's manager, Emilio Estefan. It was filmed from the same angle throughout almost all of the video and a black and white filter was applied to the footage, although a version in color later leaked online. It is set in an open-plan living room and kitchen with furniture reminiscent of the 1960s, where Shakira performs house activities such as inside a refrigerator, shaving her leg, and sitting on a couch. She is later joined by three cellists who leave at the end. The final scene has the camera pan out of the room window and onto the street outside.

== Formats and track listings ==
Promotional single

1. Tú – 3:36

Mexican Maxi CD

1. "Tú" (Dance radio edit) – 3:43
2. "Tú" (Dance Cool radio edit) – 3:45
3. "Tú" (Hip club version) – 7:00
4. "Tú" (Smog Underground Trip) – 6:54
5. "Tú" (Extended Cool Dance) – 5:04
6. "Tú" (Main 12") – 10:35
7. "Tú" (7") – 4:51
8. "Tú" (remix) – 3:36

== Credits and personnel ==
Credits adapted from the liner notes of Dónde Están los Ladrones?.

- Edwin Bonilla – percussion
- Julio Hernández – bass guitar
- Alan Kendal – pedal steel guitar
- Lee Levins – drums
- Lester Mendez – producer, piano, string arrangement
- A.J. Niilo – acoustic guitar
- Shakira – songwriting, producer, lead vocals
- Dan Warner – acoustic guitar
- Adam Zimmon – electric guitar

== Charts ==
=== Weekly charts ===
Weekly chart positions for "Tú"
Chart (1999)	Peak position
Costa Rica (Notimex)	1
El Salvador (Notimex)	1
Guatemala (Notimex)	1
Honduras (Notimex)	2
Nicaragua (Notimex)	1
Panama (Notimex)	1
Puerto Rico (Notimex)	5
US Hot Latin Songs (Billboard)	1
US Latin Pop Airplay (Billboard)	1

=== Year-end charts ===
1999 year-end chart performance for "Tú"
Chart (1999)	Position
US Hot Latin Songs (Billboard)	27

== Certifications ==
Region	Certification	Certified units/sales
Mexico (AMPROFON)	Diamond+Platinum+Gold	390,000^{‡}
^{‡} Sales+streaming figures based on certification alone.

== See also ==
- List of number-one Billboard Hot Latin Tracks of 1999
- List of Billboard Latin Pop Airplay number ones of 1999
