= MTV Unplugged (Shakira album) =

Live album by Shakira
- Released: 29 February 2000
- Recorded: 12 August 1999
- Venue: Manhattan Center Studios (Manhattan, New York City, United States)
- Genre: Latin pop; acoustic rock
- Length: 50:41
- Language: Spanish
- Label: Sony Colombia
- Producer: Shakira; Tim Mitchell

Shakira chronology
Dónde Están los Ladrones? (1998)	MTV Unplugged (2000)	Laundry Service (2001)

Shakira video chronology
MTV Unplugged (2002)	Live & off the Record (2004)

Singles from MTV Unplugged
- 1. "No Creo" Released: 4 January 2000

Professional ratings
Review scores
Source	Rating
Allmusic	4.5/5 stars

MTV Unplugged is the first live album by Colombian singer-songwriter Shakira, released on 29 February 2000, by Sony Music Colombia. It was recorded on 12 August 1999, during her MTV Unplugged performance at the Grand Ballroom in New York City.

The performance was released in 2000 as a live album, and again in 2002 as a DVD. It was critically acclaimed by American critics and earned Shakira her first Grammy Award for Best Latin Pop Album. To promote the album, "No Creo" was released as single, meanwhile "Dónde Están los Ladrones?", "Moscas en la Casa" and "Ojos Así" released as promotional singles.

== Production and reception ==
The Unplugged concert was the program's first episode to be broadcast entirely in Spanish and served as her major breakthrough in the U.S. market. The concert is noted to be the "first time a Latin pop act attempted an Unplugged, the first Latina solo act to do so, and the first time a Latino act didn't tape their performance at MTV's studios in Miami."

The concert has received critical acclaim, and is included on lists of best unplugged performances. The performance is listed on Vulture Magazine's “7 Really Good MTV Unplugged Performances” list. Nylon has included “Sombra De Ti” on the list “10 Of The Best ‘MTV Unplugged’ Performances.” Yardbarker ranked the album at number 3 on their list of“20 greatest MTV 'Unplugged' albums.” . ”Remezcla” includes the performance on “The 10 Most Iconic Latin American ‘MTV Unplugged’ Performances.” MTV Unplugged has sold over 1.3 million units worldwide by June 2001.

== Track listing ==
MTV Unplugged – CD (2000)
No.	Title	Writer(s)	Length
1.	"Octavo Día"	Lester Mendez; Shakira	6:21
2.	"Si Te Vas"	Luis Fernando Ochoa; Shakira	3:40
3.	"Dónde Están los Ladrones?"	Ochoa; Shakira	3:32
4.	"Moscas En La Casa"	Shakira	3:52
5.	"Ciega, Sordomuda"	Estefano Salgado; Shakira	4:09
6.	"Inevitable"	Ochoa; Shakira	3:39
7.	"Estoy Aquí"	Ochoa; Shakira	4:58
8.	"Tú"	Dillon O'Brien; Shakira	5:22
9.	"Sombra De Ti"	Ochoa; Shakira	4:07
10.	"No Creo"	Ochoa; Shakira	4:08
11.	"Ojos Así"	Javier Garza; Pedro Flores; Shakira	6:50
Total length:			50:41

MTV Unplugged – DVD (2002)
No.	Title	Length
1.	"Octavo Día"	5:35
2.	"Si Te Vas"	4:00
3.	"Dónde Están Los Ladrones?"	3:29
4.	"Ciega, Sordomuda"	4:14
5.	"Inevitable"	3:52
6.	"Moscas En La Casa"	3:55
7.	"Estoy Aquí"	4:56
8.	"Tú"	5:05
9.	"Sombra De Ti"	4:07
10.	"No Creo"	4:05
11.	"Ojos Así"	6:40
Total length:		49:58

Bonus features

1. Timeline
2. Albums
3. Photo Gallery
4. Making Of (½ hour program)

== Personnel ==
- Shakira - Producer, songwriter, arranger, lead vocals, harmonica, guitar
- Emilio Estefan Jr. - Executive producer
- Tim Mitchell - Producer, arranger, guitar
- Sean Murphy - Producer
- Marcello Anez - Engineer
- Adam Blackburn - Engineer
- Scott Canto - Engineer
- Sebastian Krys - Engineer
- Mauricio Guerrero - Mixer
- Eric Schilling - Mixer
- Tony Blanc - Mixing assistant
- Steve Penny - Mixing assistant
- Maurizio Teilla - Mixing assistant
- Bob Ludwig - Mastering
- George Noreiga - Guitar, backing vocals
- Donna Allen - Backing vocals
- Rita Quintero - Backing vocals
- Luis Fernando Ochoa - Guitar, arranger
- Ben Peeler - Lap steel guitar, mandolin, dobro, bazouki
- Pedro Alfonso - Violin
- Albert Menendez - Piano
- Ricardo Suarez - Bass guitar
- Brendan Buckley - Drums, percussion
- Ebenezer da Silva - percussions
- Myriam Eli - percussions
- Los Mora Arriaga - Mariachi Band on "Ciega, Sordomuda"

== Charts ==
Chart (2000)	Peak position
Austrian Albums (Ö3 Austria)	55
Colombia (Notimex)	3
Dutch Albums (Album Top 100)	81
German Albums (Offizielle Top 100)	91
Mexico Top 100	1
US Billboard 200	124
US Heatseekers Albums (Billboard)	1
US Top Latin Albums (Billboard)	1
US Latin Pop Albums (Billboard)	1

== Certifications ==
=== Album ===
Region	Certification	Certified units/sales
Argentina (CAPIF)	Platinum	60,000^{^}
Brazil (Pro-Música Brasil)	Gold	100,000^{*}
Chile	7× Platinum	
Colombia Physical sales	Diamond+Platinum	
Colombia Digital streams	Gold	
Mexico (AMPROFON)	3× Platinum	450,000^{‡}
United States (RIAA)	4× Platinum (Latin)	400,000^{^}
^{*} Sales figures based on certification alone.^{^} Shipments figures based on certification alone.^{‡} Sales+streaming figures based on certification alone.

=== DVD ===
Region	Certification	Certified units/sales
Chile	22× Platinum	
Germany (BVMI)	Gold	25,000^{^}
Spain (Promusicae)	Gold	10,000^{^}
United States (RIAA)	Gold	50,000^{^}
^{^} Shipments figures based on certification alone.

== Accolades ==
Year	Category	Title	Result
2000	Latin Grammy Award for Album of the Year	MTV Unplugged	Nominated
2000	Latin Grammy Award for Best Pop Vocal Album	MTV Unplugged	Nominated
2001	Grammy Award for Best Latin Pop Album	MTV Unplugged	Won
2001	Lo Nuestro Award for Rock Album of the Year	MTV Unplugged	Won
