= Max Salazar =

American musicologist

Max Salazar (April 17, 1932 – September 19, 2010) was an American musicologist specializing in the history of Latin music. He was a senior editor of the Latin Beat Magazine and the contributing editor of the Impacto magazine. He was a lecturer at the UCLA, Smithsonian Institution and several colleges.

He authored the 2002 book Mambo Kingdom: Latin Music in New York, a number of articles about mambo star Tito Puente, and over 200 other dance articles for magazines such as Village Voice, Latin Times, and Billboard.

== Books ==
- Salazar, Max (2002). Mambo Kingdom - Latin Music in New York. New York: Schirmer Trade Books. ISBN 0-8256-7277-5.
