= Moscas en la Casa =

- Artwork used for promotional US CD single

Single by Shakira

from the album Dónde Están los Ladrones?
- Language: Spanish
- Released: 10 December 1999
- Recorded: 1998
- Studio: Crescent Moon Studios (Miami, Florida)
- Genre: Latin pop
- Length: 3:31
- Label: Sony Colombia
- Songwriter: Shakira
- Producers: Shakira; Lester Mendez

Shakira singles chronology
"Ojos Así" (1999)	"Moscas en la Casa" (1999)	"Whenever, Wherever" (2001)

Live video
- "Moscas en la Casa" on YouTube

"Moscas en la Casa" (transl. "Flies in the House") is a song by the Colombian singer-songwriter Shakira, released as the sixth and final single from her fourth studio album Dónde Están los Ladrones? (1998). A Latin pop ballad, Shakira explains the sadness that she feels after a broken relationship and how she has let herself go, while she continues to wait for him to come back. The song deals with themes of heartbreak, loneliness, and longing after the end of a romantic relationship.

Upon release, the song experienced moderate commercial success, particularly in Latin American markets. Although it was a radio-only single without an official music video, the song resonated with audiences, reaching number one in Colombia and securing top 10 positions in countries like Argentina, Bolivia, Chile, Ecuador, and Peru. In the United States, it peaked at number 10 on the Billboard Latin Pop Songs chart and number 25 on the Hot Latin Songs chart. The promotional efforts included a live performance from Shakira's MTV Unplugged concert, which was widely broadcast and later uploaded to her official YouTube channel, where it has garnered significant viewership.

Shakira's live performance of "Moscas en la Casa" for her 1999 MTV Unplugged session offers a poignant and intimate interpretation of the song's themes of longing and heartbreak. Recorded at the Big Ballroom of Manhattan Center Studios in New York City, the setting is minimalist, allowing the emotional depth of the lyrics to take center stage. Shakira delivers the ballad with heartfelt vulnerability, her expressive vocals conveying the pain of a lost relationship.

== Background and release ==
After she rose to prominence with the success of her major-label debut Pies Descalzos (1995), Shakira was introduced to Emilio Estefan, the most important producer in the Hispanic market at the time, by her promoter and longtime friend, Jairo Martínez. Estefan was renowned for launching the careers of several Hispanic singers, including Enrique Iglesias, Thalía, and his wife Gloria Estefan. He decided to work with Shakira as he identified her potential to break into the US Latin market. One of Shakira's concerns about working with Estefan was creative control over her music. Before signing their contract, the roles and duties were defined: Estefan would be her manager and executive producer, but she would be in charge of all material and arrangements and have final approval over her records. She later stated about Estefan, "He had a great respect for me as an artist and trusted me totally on this project". Since then, they started working at Estefan's Crescent Moon Studios in Miami.

"Moscas en la Casa" was released in 1999 as the sixth single from the album. Shakira wrote the song for Puerto Rican telenovela actor Osvaldo Ríos, her boyfriend at the time for who she also had written the songs "Tú" and "Ojos Así".

== Music video ==
The music video for the song is actually a recording from her first live album MTV Unplugged which was recorded in New York City in 1999.

== Track listing ==
CD single
No.	Title	Length
1.	"Moscas En La Casa" (Album Version)	3:32
2.	"Moscas En La Casa" (Tropical Mix)	4:14
3.	"Moscas En La Casa" (Dance Radio Edit)	4:10
4.	"Moscas En La Casa" (Club Mix)	7:05
5.	"Moscas En La Casa" (Vocal Dub Mix)	6:37
Total length:		25:38

== Charts ==
Chart (1999)	Peak position
US Hot Latin Songs (Billboard)	25
US Latin Pop Airplay (Billboard)	10

== Certifications ==
Region	Certification	Certified units/sales
Mexico (AMPROFON)	Diamond	300,000^{‡}
^{‡} Sales+streaming figures based on certification alone.

== Sources ==
- Diego, Ximena (2001b). Shakira: Woman Full of Grace. Simon & Schuster. ISBN 978-0743216234.
