= Ciega, Sordomuda =

- Artwork used for Mexican promotional CD single

Single by Shakira

from the album Dónde Están los Ladrones?
- Released: 7 September 1998
- Studio: Crescent Moon, Miami, Florida
- Genre: Pop rock
- Length: 4:28
- Label: Sony Colombia
- Composers: Shakira; Estéfano
- Lyricist: Shakira
- Producers: Shakira; Lester Méndez

Shakira singles chronology
| "Se Quiere, Se Mata" (1997) | "Ciega, Sordomuda" (1998) | "Tú" (1998) |

Music video
- "Ciega, Sordomuda" on YouTube

"Ciega, Sordomuda" (transl. "Blind, Deaf and Mute") is a song by Colombian singer Shakira from her fourth studio album, Dónde Están los Ladrones? (1998). A pop rock track, it utilizes mariachi trumpets and lyrically equates total love to a person being blind, deaf, and mute. It was released as the album's lead single on 7 September 1998 by Sony Colombia. The lyrics were written by Shakira. Its music was co-composed by Shakira and Estéfano, while produced by the singer and Lester Méndez.

"Ciega Sordomuda" received positive reactions from music critics, who praised the instruments used and compared it to Shakira's breakout hit "Estoy Aquí". The song was nominated in the category of Pop Song of the Year at the 1999 Lo Nuestro Awards and was a recipient of a Broadcast Music, Inc. (BMI) Latin Award in 2000. An accompanying music video was filmed in Los Angeles, California and directed by Gustavo Garzón. The film depicts Shakira and her partner being chased by cyber police after escaping jail.

The song was included in the set list for the Tour Anfibio, Tour of the Mongoose, the Oral Fixation Tour, and The Sun Comes Out World Tour. Shakira also performed an acoustic version of the song for her first live album, MTV Unplugged (2000). Commercially, the track topped the Billboard Hot Latin Songs and Latin Pop Airplay charts in the United States; it also became a number-one hit in Costa Rica, Panama and her native Colombia; and reached the top ten in five other countries.

== Background ==
After rising to prominence with the success of her major-label debut album Pies Descalzos (1995), Shakira was introduced to Emilio Estefan, the most important producer in the Hispanic market at the time, by her promoter and longtime friend, Jairo Martínez. Estefan was renowned for launching the careers of several Hispanic singers, including Enrique Iglesias, Thalía, and his wife Gloria Estefan. He decided to work with Shakira as he identified her potential to break into the US Latin market, though one of Shakira's concerns about working with Estefan was creative control over her music. Before signing their contract, the roles and duties were finalized: Estefan would be her manager and executive producer, but she would be in charge of all material and arrangements and have final approval over her records. She later stated about Estefan, "He had a great respect for me as an artist and trusted me totally on this project." Since then, they started working on Estefan's Crescent Moon Studios in Miami. She insisted on perfection, working on the material to the point of exhaustion. "I made two or three demos of each song. I became a human being so demanding of myself that until the song made my hair stand on end, I wouldn't stop".

Equipment for the recording of Dónde Están los Ladrones? included old amplifiers to achieve a better sound, a 40-year-old German microphone, and several innovations in the instrumental mixes. Dónde Están los Ladrones? took nine months to produce, more than Shakira's previous records since more people were involved on this album. Shakira commented, "To me it's a normal time, the gestation period for a baby. But many people wag their finger and tell me that the next one cannot take so long..."

== Composition ==
"Ciega, Sordomuda" was composed by Shakira with Colombian musician Estéfano, with production being handled by the singer and Lester Méndez. Shakira wrote the lyrics to the song. The recurring phrase of the chorus and title of the song was inspired by Shakira's mother, who used to scold her when she wouldn't pay attention as a child by using the Spanish-language sarcastic saying: "Hazte la ciega, la sorda y la muda", which translates to "Pretend to be blind, deaf and mute." Musically, "Ciega, Sordomuda" is a pop rock song that equates "total love to being blind, deaf, and mute" and incorporates mariachi trumpets at various points, arrangements which were composed by Shakira herself. Lyrically, Shakira describes herself as "brute, blind, deaf, dumb, clumsy, fretful, stubborn" to a love who has her "haggard, skinny, ugly, disheveled, clumsy, dumb, slow, foolish, unhinged, completely out of control".

== Reception ==
John Lannert of Billboard noted that the track "strongly resembles" to her breakout hit, "Estoy Aquí" (1995). The Dallas Morning News critic Mario Tarradell regarded "Ciega, Sordomuda" as "an obvious first single" with its "jittery pop-rock feel" and also made a comparison to "Estoy Aquí". Mark Kemp, writing for the book The New Rolling Stone Album Guide, felt that the artist "pays tribute to her Latin roots in the Spanish guitars and trumpets". The Latin Beat Magazine editor Franz Reynold called the song a "mid-tempo rocker dedicated to the horrors of emotional co-dependency-with mariachi-style brass flitting in and out of the spare vocal and the airy strum of guitars." Ramiro Burr of the San Antonio Express-News found it to be one of the album's "catchy tunes", while a writer for The Asahi Shimbun found the track to be "especially addictive". On the review of the album for Newsday, Richard Torres observed the "cry of individuality" in the song.

"Ciega, Sordomuda" was nominated in the category of Pop Song of the Year at the 11th Annual Lo Nuestro Awards in 1999, but ultimately lost to "La Copa de la Vida" by Ricky Martin. It was acknowledged as an award-winning song at the 2000 BMI Latin Awards. "Ciega, Sordomuda" ranked number 89 on Billboard's "The 98 Greatest Songs of 1998", with Leila Cobo noting that the song "broke completely with everything popular Latina musicians had been doing up to that point". It was listed among Shakira's 26 Best Songs by HipLatina.

In the US, "Ciega Sordomuda" debuted at number seven on the Billboard Hot Latin Songs chart on the week of 24 October 1998. It reached the summit a month later, spending three weeks at this spot. The song also topped the Latin Pop Airplay chart and peaked at number seven in Spain. In November 1999, it was labeled as one of the "hottest tracks" for Sony Discos in a list including the most successful songs released by the label since the launching of the Billboard Hot Latin Tracks chart in 1986.

== Promotion and live performances ==
"Ciega, Sordomuda" was released to radio stations worldwide as the album's lead single on 4 September 1998. It was later included on her greatest hits album Grandes Éxitos (2002). The music video for the song was directed by Gustavo Garzón and filmed in Miami. The film depicts Shakira being jailed and escaping with her partner. They are then chased by several policemen, who are revealed to be robots at the end. Various scenes include the couple driving blindfolded and Shakira performing with guests dancing in the background. The video was nominated in the category of Video of the Year at the 1999 Lo Nuestro Awards, but ultimately lost to "Esperanza" by Enrique Iglesias.

"Ciega, Sordomuda" was included on the set list for the following tours: Tour Anfibio (2000), Tour of the Mongoose (2002–03), the Oral Fixation Tour (2006–07), and The Sun Comes Out World Tour (2010–11), The Los Angeles Times writer Ernesto Lechner noted Shakira's "disjointed robotic movements" while she performed the track at the Arrowhead Pond in 2000. For The Sun Comes Tour, a Stroh violin was used to replace the horn sections of the original recording. David Hardwick from Spinning Platters said the use of the instrument was "impressive". She also sung the track during the 11th Annual Lo Nuestro Awards and Miss Colombia 1999. In August 1999, Shakira sang an acoustic version of "Ciega, Sordomuda" during an episode of MTV Unplugged in New York City as a mariachi tune, where she was accompanied by El Mariachi Los Mora Arriaga. The performance was included on her first live album, MTV Unplugged (2000). As part of The Latin Recording Academy tribute to Shakira, who was presented with the Person of the Year accolade in 2011, Mexican singer Alejandra Guzmán and Spanish musician Natalia Jiménez performed "Ciega, Sordomuda" as a duet.

== Formats and track listings ==
Promo CD

1. "Ciega, Sordomuda" – 4:28

Spanish Maxi CD

1. "Ciega, Sordomuda" (12" full mix) – 10:51
2. "Ciega, Sordomuda" (12" single edit) – 4:36
3. "Ciega, Sordomuda" (dub mix) – 8:01
4. "Ciega, Sordomuda" (radio edit) – 4:37

== Credits and personnel ==
Credits adapted from the liner notes of "Ciega, Sordomuda".

- Marcelo Acevedo – acoustic guitar
- Tommy Anthony – backing vocalist
- Estéfano – songwriting
- Julio Hernández – bass guitar
- Sebastian Krys – mixing
- Lester Mendez – producer, keyboards, programmer
- Shakira – songwriting, producer, lead vocals
- Claudio Speiwak – acoustic guitar
- Nicolás Tovar – backing vocalist
- Teddy Mulet – trumpet
- Adam Zimmon – electric guitar

== Charts ==
Weekly chart positions for "Ciega, Sordomuda"
| Chart (1998) | Peak position |
|---|---|
| Colombia (Notimex) | 1 |
| Costa Rica (Notimex) | 1 |
| El Salvador (Notimex) | 3 |
| Guatemala (Notimex) | 2 |
| Honduras (Notimex) | 4 |
| Nicaragua (Notimex) | 2 |
| Panama (Notimex) | 1 |
| Puerto Rico (Notimex) | 3 |
| Spain (AFYVE) | 7 |
| US Hot Latin Songs (Billboard) | 1 |
| US Latin Pop Airplay (Billboard) | 1 |

== Certifications ==
Certifications for "Ciega, Sordomuda"
| Region | Certification | Certified units/sales |
|---|---|---|
| Mexico (AMPROFON) | 2× Diamond+4× Platinum | 840,000^{‡} |
| Spain (Promusicae) | Platinum | 60,000^{‡} |
| United States (RIAA) | Gold | 500,000^{‡} |
^{‡} Sales+streaming figures based on certification alone.

== Covers ==
The song was covered by Croatian singer Vesna Pisarović under the title "Da je meni (oko moje)". This version served as the second single from Pisarović's sophomore album Za tebe stvorena.

== See also ==
- List of number-one Billboard Hot Latin Tracks of 1998
- List of Billboard Latin Pop Airplay number ones of 1998
