= Octavo Día =

- Artwork for the promotional CD single

Promotional single by Shakira

from the album Dónde Están los Ladrones?
- Released: 6 November 2000
- Recorded: 1998
- Studio: Crescent Moon Studios (Miami, FL)
- Genre: Rock en español
- Length: 4:32
- Label: Sony Latin
- Composers: Shakira; Lester Mendez
- Lyricist: Shakira
- Producers: Shakira; Lester Mendez

Shakira promotional singles chronology
"Dónde Están los Ladrones?" (1998)	"Octavo Día" (2000)	"Si Te Vas" (1999)

Live video
- "Octavo Día" on YouTube

"Octavo Día" (English: Eighth Day) is a song written and performed by Colombian singer-songwriter Shakira. The song was released as a promotional single from her fourth studio Dónde Están los Ladrones? (1998), but received attention when it caused controversy after the singer performed it live in her 2002-2003 world tour. The song expresses Shakira's opinion about God.

== Background ==
In an interview with MTV News, Shakira stated that "Octavo Dia" "talks about God when he created the world, the eighth day he went for a walk to outer space and when he came back he found our world in an infernal mess. And he found that we were being controlled and manipulated by just a few leaders and that we were like pieces of a chess game".

== Live performances ==
Shakira performed "Octavo Día" at a concert held on 12 August 1999 at Grand Ballroom, which later became MTV Unplugged. She also performed it during the 2000 Tour Anfibio.

In the Tour of the Mongoose, behind the stage was a black and white backdrop video of George W. Bush and Saddam Hussein playing chess, and on the stage some of the musicians were wearing masks of Richard Nixon and Cuba's president Fidel Castro.

During the video at the show, Hussein's and Bush's puppets suddenly became restless and violent as they started playing with nuclear bombs instead of chess pieces. Then the Grim Reaper appeared behind the two leaders and moved the strings that control the puppets. Shakira said during the concert that pop singers typically do not talk about politics nor about politicians, but this time, her tour had a political view. "I know pop stars are not supposed to stick their noses into politics", said Shakira during her concert in New York. "Sometimes people don't want to see pop stars giving their opinion about political situations. They think pop stars are made to entertain. Period. I don't see it that way. I know it was a little risky to use my show to deliver a message and many people around me told me not to do it, but, at the end of the day, it was a statement about love and what I feel this world and its leaders are lacking", she later told The Guardian.

The symbolism of the video clip was that Bush and Hussein were treating the war as if a game, as if not treating it with much importance. The performance ended with a quote from Jimi Hendrix in the back screen of the stage: "When the power of love overcomes the love for power, the world will know the peace."

However, some members of the audience were confused with Shakira's criticism when she performed "Octavo Día". David Hiltbrand, a journalist from The Philadelphia Inquirer, said that it was an atypical show number. "I thought it was a mistake, personally, not as a journalist. What I took from it [is that] our leaders are caught up with themselves," Hiltbrand said.

== Awards ==
Year	Ceremony	Award	Result	Ref.
2000	Latin Grammy Awards	Female Rock Vocal Performance	Won	
