= Brian Weiss =

American psychiatrist

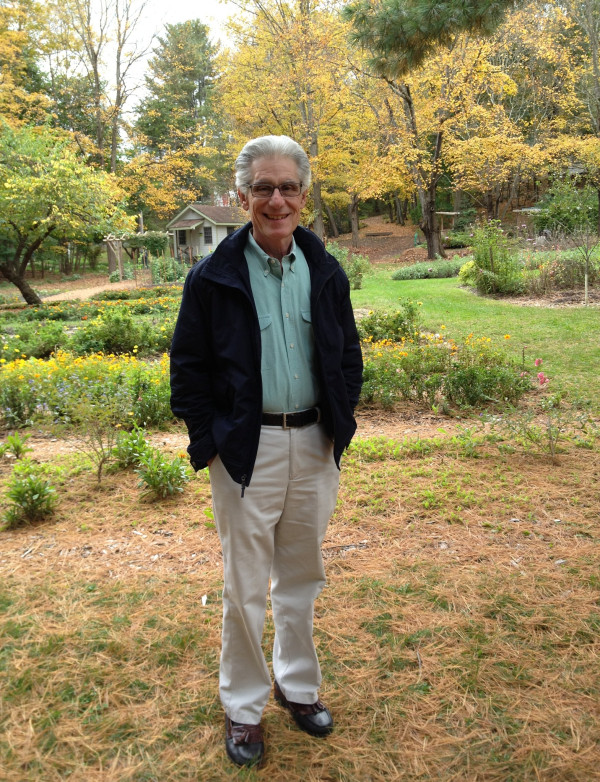
- Brian Weiss in 2012
- Born: Brian Leslie Weiss; November 6, 1944 (age 81); New York City, USA
- Education: Columbia University (BA); Yale University (MD)
- Known for: Hypnotherapy, Reincarnation research, Author
- Scientific career
- Fields: Psychiatry
- Website: www.brianweiss.com

Brian Leslie Weiss (born November 6, 1944) is an American psychiatrist, hypnotherapist, and author who specializes in past life regression. His writings include reincarnation, past life regression, future life progression, and survival of the soul after death.

== Education and medical career ==
Weiss graduated from Columbia University in 1966, and later graduated from the Yale University School of Medicine in 1970, completing an internship in internal medicine at the New York University Medical Center, then returning to Yale for a two-year residency in psychiatry. He went on to become Head of Psychiatry, Mount Sinai Medical Center, Miami.

== Past life regression and future life progression ==
According to Weiss, in 1980, one of his patients, "Catherine", began discussing past-life experiences under hypnosis. Weiss did not believe in reincarnation at the time, but after confirming elements of Catherine's stories through public records, came to be convinced of the survival of an element of the human personality after death. Dr. Weiss was astonished and skeptical when Catherine began recalling past-life traumas that seemed to hold the key to her recurring nightmares and anxiety attacks. His skepticism was eroded, however, when she began to channel messages from her spirit guide/Master who made remarkable revelations about Dr. Weiss's family and his dead son. Weiss claims he has regressed more than 4,000 patients since 1980.

Weiss advocates hypnotic regression as therapy, claiming that many phobias and ailments are rooted in past-life experiences whose acknowledgement by the patient can have a curative effect. Weiss also writes about messages received from the "Masters", or "super-evolved, nonphysical souls", he claims to have communicated with through his subjects. Weiss holds workshops and seminars across the United States that explain and teach self-regression meditation techniques.

== Personal life ==
Weiss lives with his wife Carole in Miami, Florida, where he has written and conducted public seminars and workshops on the subject of reincarnation.

Daughter Amy E. Weiss is the co-author of his book Miracles Happen: The Transformational Healing Power of Past-Life Memories (2012).

== Bibliography ==
- Many Lives, Many Masters: The True Story of a Prominent Psychiatrist, His Young Patient, and the Past-Life Therapy That Changed Both Their Lives (1988) ISBN 0-671-65786-0
- Through Time into Healing: Discovering the Power of Regression Therapy to Erase Trauma and Transform Mind, Body and Relationships (1993) ISBN 0-7499-1835-7
- Only Love Is Real: A Story of Soulmates Reunited (1996) ISBN 0-7499-1620-6
- Messages From the Masters: Tapping into the Power of Love (2001) ISBN 0-7499-2167-6
- Same Soul, Many Bodies: Discover the Healing Power of Future Lives through Progression Therapy (2005) ISBN 0-7499-2541-8 ISBN 0-7432-6434-7
- Miracles Happen: The Transformational Healing Power of Past Life Memories (2012) ISBN 978-0-06-220122-5

=== CD Included ===
- Mirrors of Time: Using Regression for Physical, Emotional, and Spiritual Healing (2002) ISBN 1-5617-0929-8
- Meditation: Achieving Inner Peace and Tranquility In Your Life (2002) ISBN 1-5617-0930-1
- Eliminating Stress, Finding Inner Peace (2003) ISBN 1-4019-0244-8

=== Card Deck ===
- Healing the Mind and Spirit Cards (2003) ISBN 1-5617-0948-4
- Past Life Oracle Cards (2014, Co-authored with Doreen Virtue) ISBN 978-1-4019-4367-7
