= Latin Beat Magazine =

Publication dedicated to all styles of Latin music

Latin Beat Magazin
- Available in: English
- Founded: 1991
- Headquarters: Gardena, California, {{{location_country}}}
- Website: Latin Beat Magazine

The Latin Beat Magazine is a publication dedicated to all styles of Latin music, edited and published by Rudolph (Rudy) and Yvette Mangual. The first issue was launched on January 1, 1991. It is currently headquartered at Gardena, California, United States.

The magazine regularly publishes articles in history of Latin music (Max Salazar is among regular contributors), filling the gap in the fields such as history of Latin Jazz. Jazz commentator Scott Yanow gives credits to the magazine in the introduction to his book "Afro-Cuban Jazz".

In 2009 the magazine ceased printing and will continue as an online publication only.
