= Notimex =

Defunct Mexican news agency

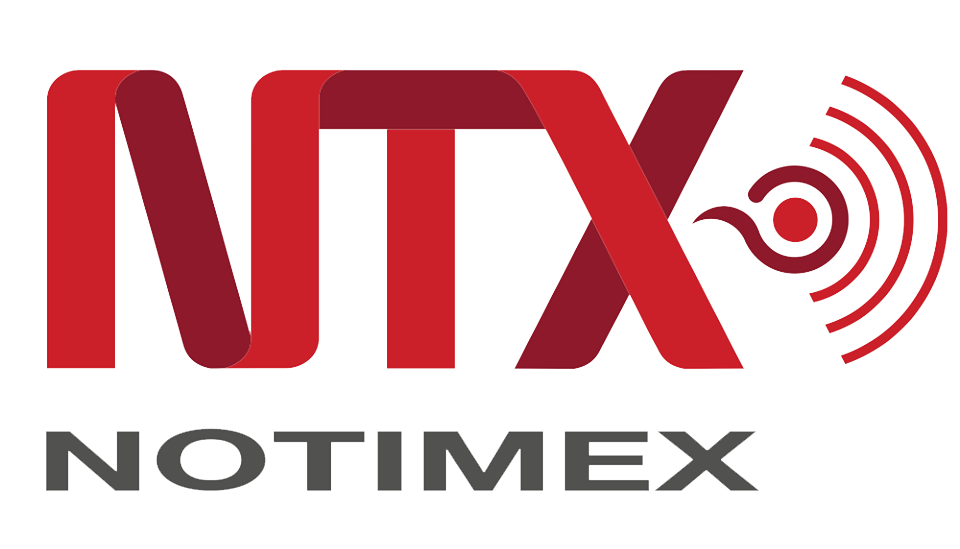
- Type: State-owned
- Industry: News agency
- Founded: August 20, 1968
- Defunct: December 13, 2023
- Fate: Dissolved
- Headquarters: Mexico City, Mexico
- Owner: Government of Mexico
- Number of employees: +300
- Website: www.notimex.gob.mx

Notimex was the official Mexican news agency, created on August 20, 1968, to handle coverage of the 1968 Summer Olympics. Notimex was headquartered in Mexico City and had 568 regional coordinating offices throughout Mexico. Its staff consisted of over 30,000 writers, editors, photographers, reporters, and correspondents.

It was originally called Agencia Mexicana de Noticias Notimex. Its goals, according to law, were contributing to the realization of the people's right to information through the provision of professional news services, to Mexican state and any other person, entity or public body or private, domestic or foreign, with genuine editorial independence (Article 1). Notimex's slogan was "News Agency of the Mexican State".

In June 2006, following reform of its charter, its official name became Agencia de Noticias del Estado Mexicano. The principal reform was independence from the Secretary of the Interior and administration by a governing board composed of representatives of the state.

Before its dissolution in December 2023, the agency had been on strike since February 21, 2020, and halted its news operations in June of that same year.

== Organization of Notimex ==
The administration agencies are:

- Governing Board. Composed of one representative from each of the following agencies: Secretariat of Public Education, Secretariat of the Interior, Secretariat of Finance and Public Credit, Secretariat of Foreign Affairs, Federal Electoral Institute and unionized workers from Notimex and two representatives of the Editorial Advisory Board;
- The Director-General, who is appointed by the President of Mexico.
- On July 30, 2007, Sergio Uzeta Murcio was approved unanimously by the Committee in charge of the Senate, as Director General of the new Notimex.
- On March 21, 2019, Sanjuana Martínez was designated as Director General, the first woman to occupy that position.
