= Shakira videography =

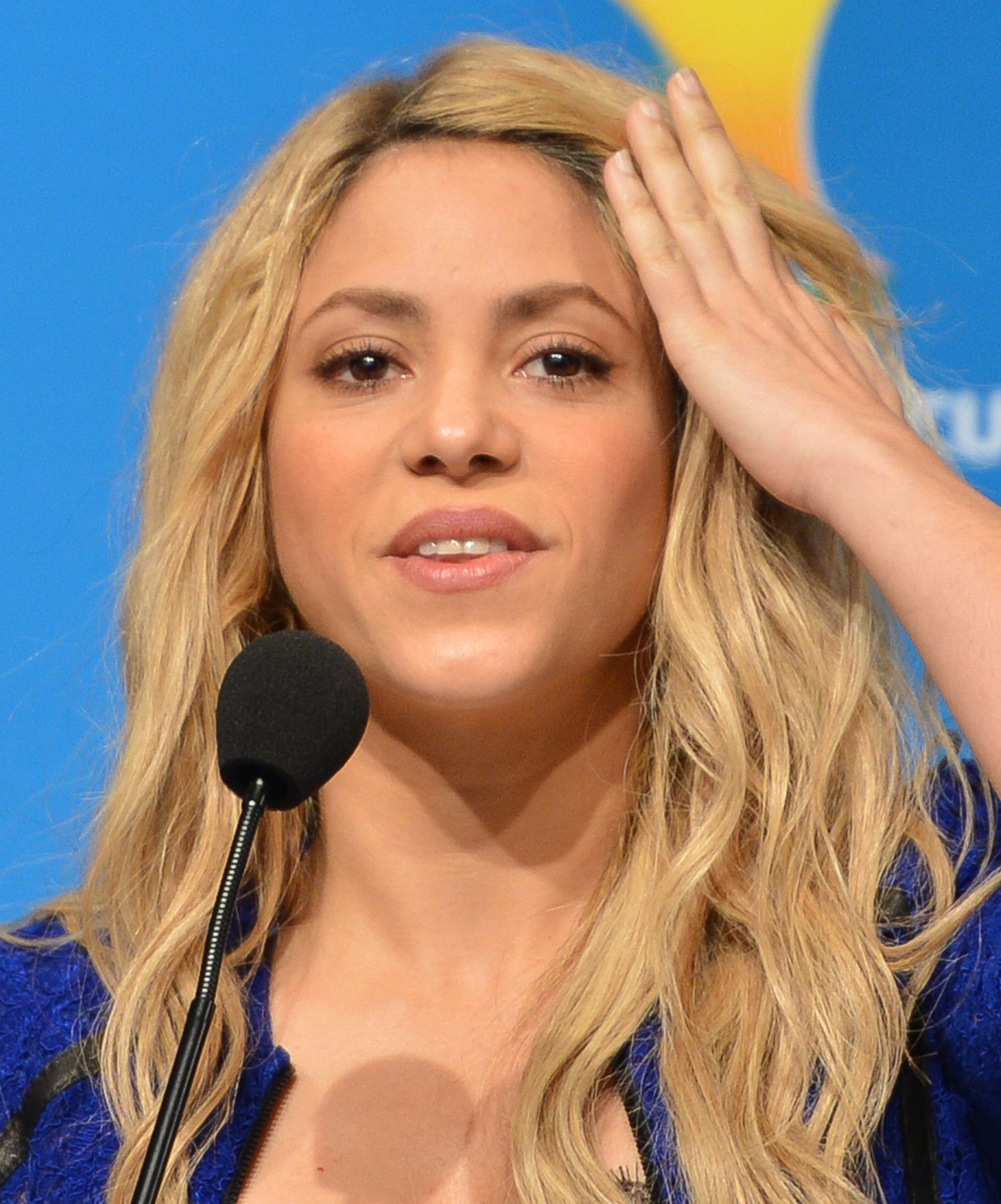
Shakira at 2014 FIFA World Cup press conference

Colombian singer-songwriter Shakira has released 95 music videos, 5 live albums, 8 films, and 4 documentaries.

In 1991, Shakira signed a recording contract with Sony Music Colombia and released her debut album Magia (1991). Three music videos were directed for the album. Only one music video was directed for her second album, Peligro. Shakira has refused to allow the re-release of any videos from her first two albums due to their "immaturity". In 1994, Shakira made her acting debut playing Luisa Maria in the Colombian telenovela El Oasis. Shakira's first major music video was for "Estoy Aquí", directed by Simón Brand, for her third album Pies Descalzos. The video depicts a barn during the various weather seasons, and shows Shakira performing the song, accompanied with a guitar. The following single, "¿Dónde Estás Corazón?", three music videos. Directors for the video included Oscar Azula, Julian Torres, Gustavo Garzón, and Camilo Falcon. Garzón also directed videos for upcoming singles "Pies Descalzos, Sueños Blancos" and "Un Poco de Amor" from the same album, whereas Juan Carlos Martin directed the video for the 1997 single "Se Quiere, Se Mata".

In 2000, Shakira released her first video album, MTV Unplugged. Five videos were directed for Shakira's fourth studio album Dónde Están los Ladrones?. Gustavo Garzón directed videos for "Ciega, Sordomuda", "Inevitable" and "No Creo". Cuban director Emilio Estefan directed the video for "Tú", and Mark Kohr directed "Ojos Así". Austrian film director Francis Lawrence directed both the English and Spanish versions of "Whenever, Wherever", the lead single from her fifth album Laundry Service. The video uses a green screen, and features Shakira surrounded by the earth's natural wonders. The following single, "Underneath Your Clothes" was directed by American photographer Herb Ritts and it was the second to last he directed before his death.

Shakira released two albums in 2005, Fijación Oral, Vol. 1 and Oral Fixation, Vol. 2. Four videos were directed for Fijación Oral, Vol. 1, and three for Oral Fixation, Vol. 2. British director Sophie Muller directed the video for one of Shakira's most successful songs, "Hips Don't Lie", featuring Wyclef Jean. Shakira also made her directing debut, co-directing videos for the singles "Illegal" and "Las de la Intuición", alongside Jaume de Laiguana. In 2006, Shakira starred in the video for her and Beyoncé's collaboration, "Beautiful Liar", which was directed by British director Jake Nava. It was filmed over two days, during the two-week production of B'Day Anthology Video Album. Because of a busy schedule, the production team did not have enough time for the choreography. In 2009, Nava also directed the videos for both the English and Spanish versions of "She Wolf". The two following singles, Did It Again and Did It Again were directed by Sophie Muller, and "Gypsy" was directed by Jaume de Laiguana.

Marcus Raboy directed videos for all versions of "Waka Waka (This Time for Africa)", which was the official song for the 2010 FIFA World Cup. Jaume de Laiguana directed the first three music videos from Shakira's ninth studio album Sale el Sol, and the fourth single, "Addicted to You" was directed by Anthony Mandler. Shakira's tenth studio album, Shakira, spawned five music videos. Joseph Kahn directed the video for "Can't Remember to Forget You", featuring Rihanna, and the solo Spanish version, "Nunca Me Acuerdo de Olvidarte". The music video for "Empire" was directed by Darren Craig, Jonathan Craven and Jeff Nicholas from the Uprising Creative. Four versions of the song "Dare (La La La)" were directed, two by Anthony Mandler and two by Jaume de Laiguana.

== Music videos ==
Key
•	Denotes music videos directed or co-directed by Shakira

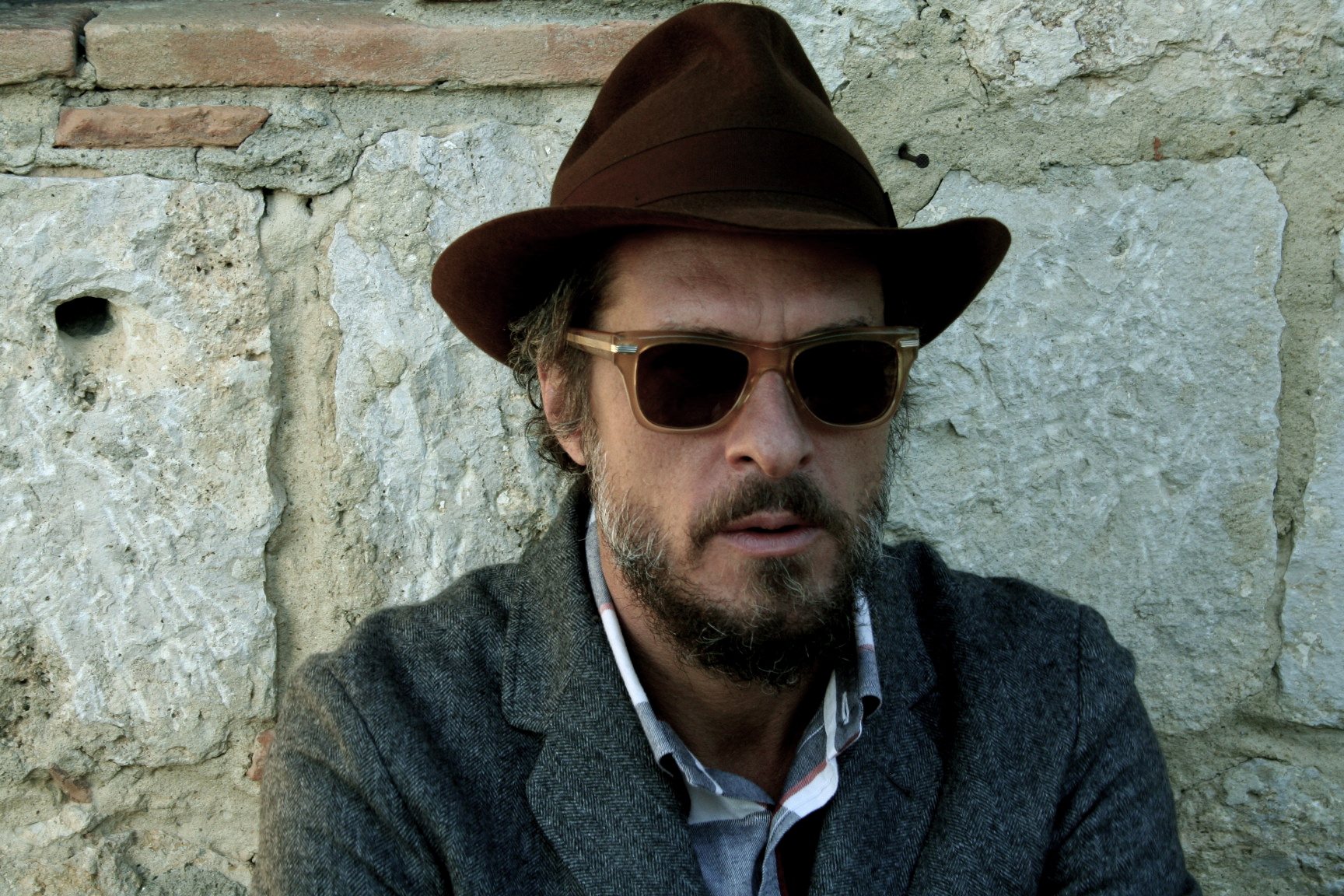
American director Michael Haussman directed the music video for one of Shakira's most successful singles, "La Tortura".

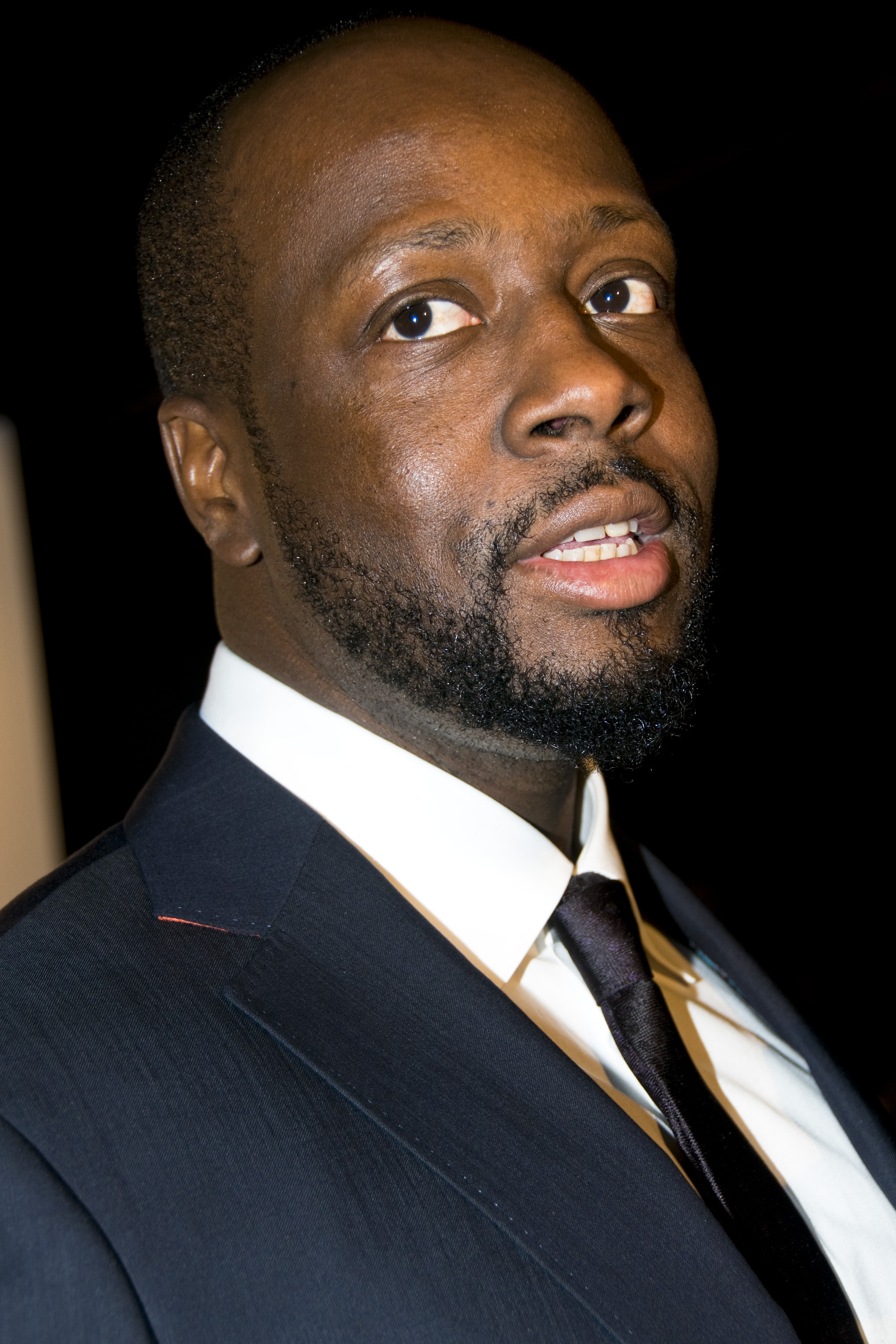
British director Sophie Muller directed the music video for "Hips Don't Lie", which features Haitian rapper Wyclef Jean (pictured).

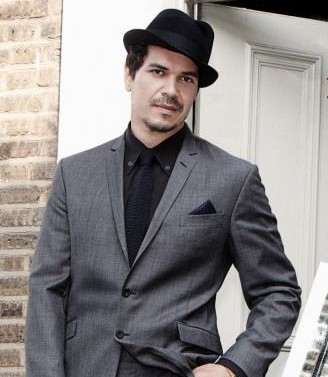
British director Jake Nava directed the video for "Beautiful Liar", which features American singer-songwriter Beyoncé.

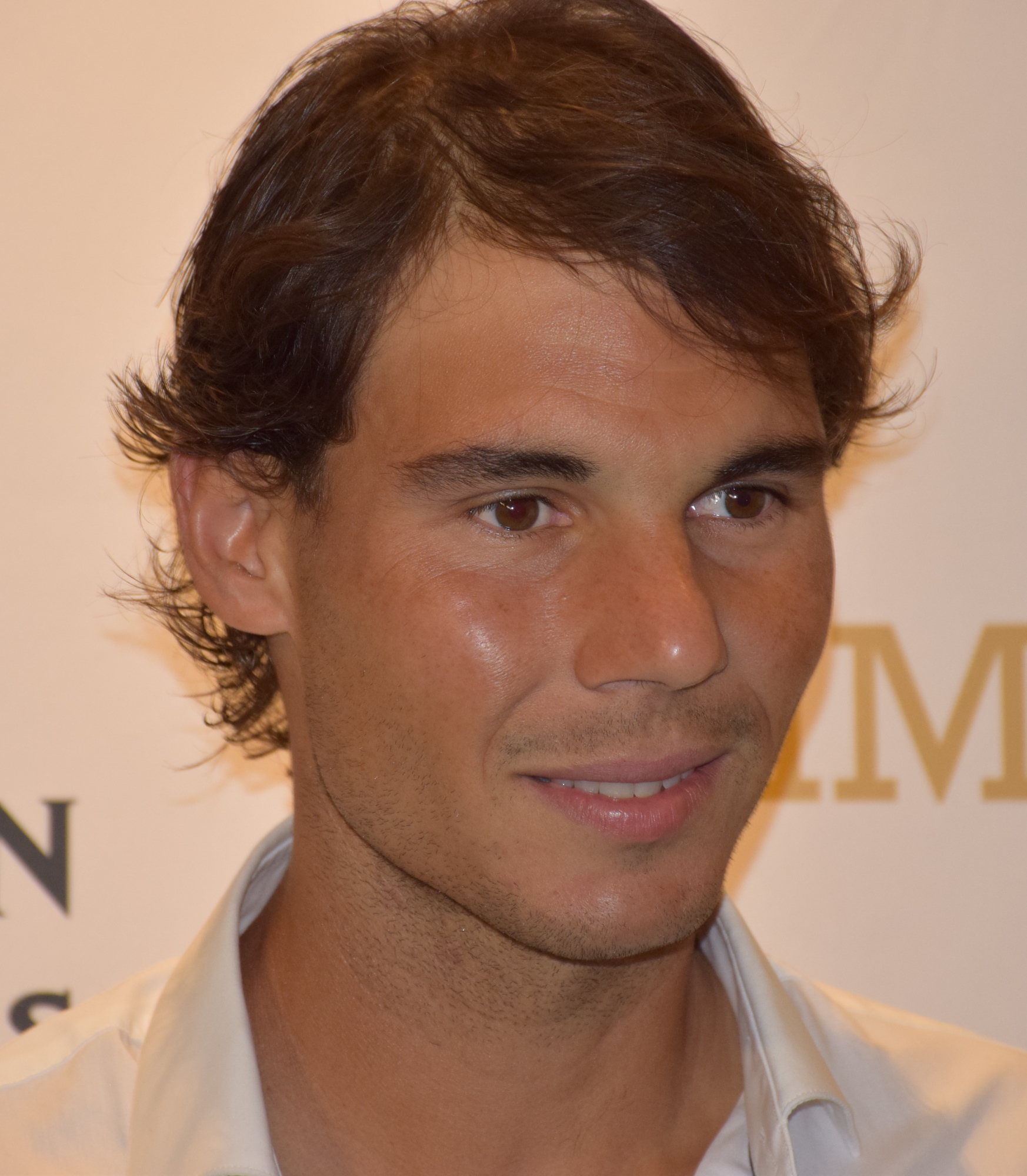
Spanish tennis player Rafael Nadal portrays Shakira's love interest in the music video for "Gypsy", directed by Jaume de Laiguana.

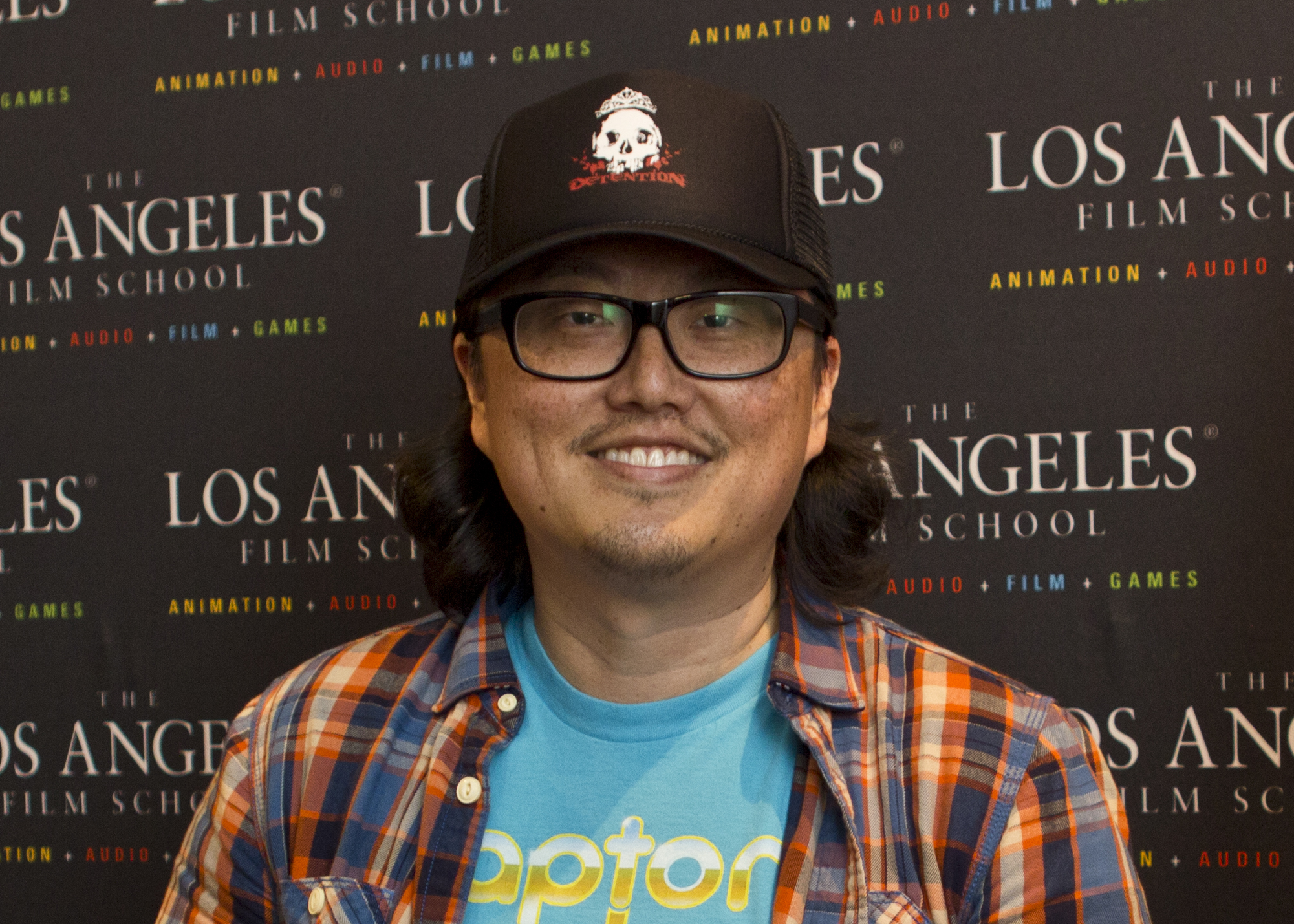
Korean director Joseph Kahn directed both the English and Spanish videos for "Can't Remember to Forget You", the English of which features Barbadian vocalist Rihanna.

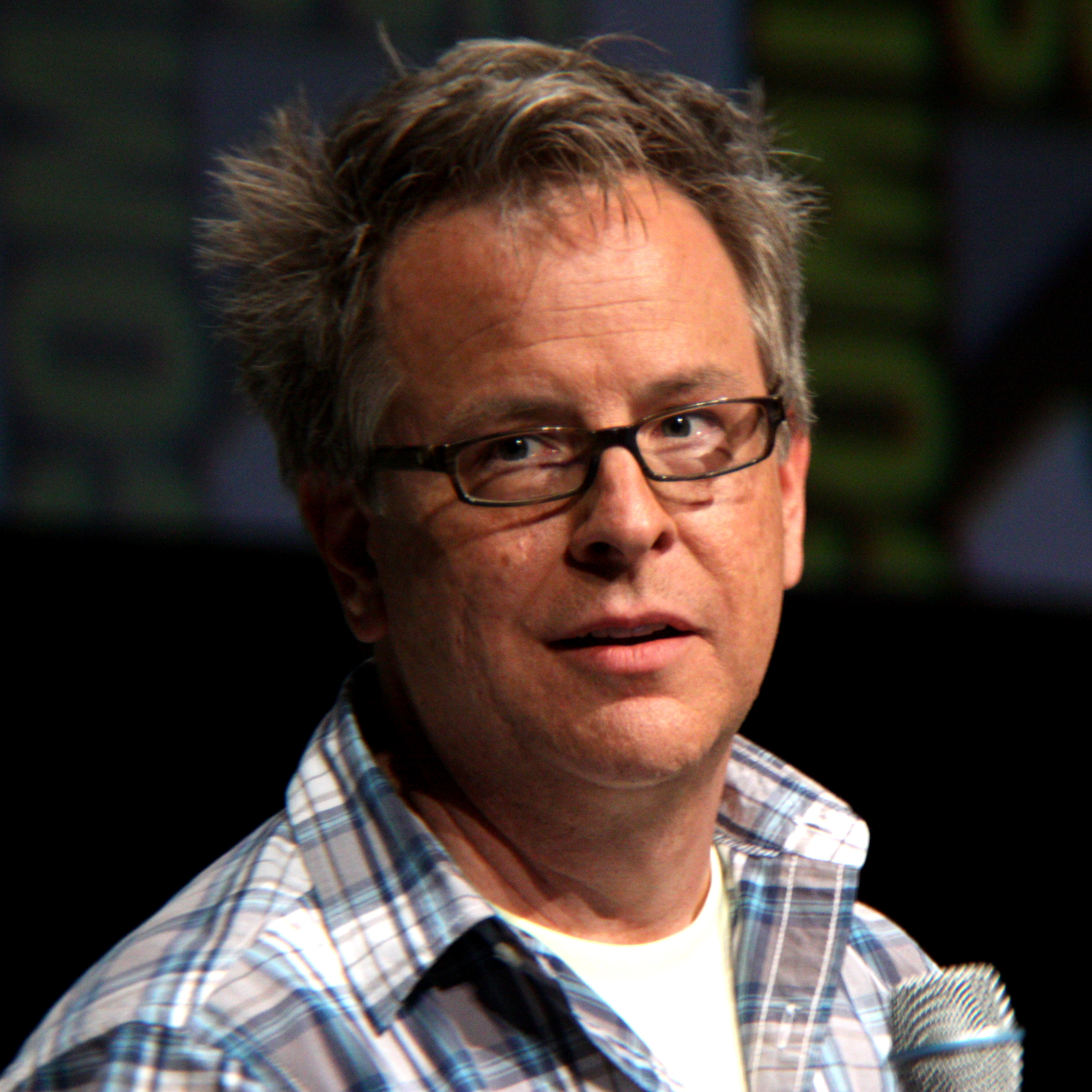
American animator Rich Moore was credited for directing the video for the song "Try Everything", due to its use of animated footage from the 2016 film Zootopia.

Title	Other performer(s)	Director(s)	Album	Year	Ref.
"Magia"	None	Unknown	Magia	1991	
"Esta Noche Voy Contigo"	None	Unknown	Magia	1991	
"Sueños"	None	Unknown	Magia	1991	
"Tú Serás la Historia de Mi Vida"	None	Unknown	Peligro	1993	
"Estoy Aquí"	None	Simón Brand	Pies Descalzos	1995	
"Estoy Aquí (Europe Mix)"	None	Christophe Gstalder	Pies Descalzos	1996	
"¿Dónde Estás Corazón?"	None	Oscar Azula; Julian Torres	Pies Descalzos	1996	
"¿Dónde Estás Corazón?" (alternate version)	None	Gustavo Garzón	Pies Descalzos	1996	
"¿Dónde Estás Corazón?" (second alternate version)	None	Camilo Falcon	Pies Descalzos	1996	
"Pies Descalzos, Sueños Blancos"	None	Gustavo Garzón	Pies Descalzos	1996	
"Un Poco de Amor"	None	Gustavo Garzón	Pies Descalzos	1996	
"Se Quiere, Se Mata"	None	Juan Carlos Martin	Pies Descalzos	1997	
"Ciega, Sordomuda"	None	Gustavo Garzón	Dónde Están los Ladrones?	1998	
"Tú"	None	Emilio Estefan	Dónde Están los Ladrones?	1998	
"Inevitable"	None	Gustavo Garzón	Dónde Están los Ladrones?	1998	
"No Creo"	None	Gustavo Garzón	Dónde Están los Ladrones?	1999	
"Ojos Así"	None	Mark Kohr	Dónde Están los Ladrones?	1999	
"Whenever, Wherever" "Suerte" (Spanish version)	None	Francis Lawrence	Laundry Service	2001	
"El Último Adiós (The Last Goodbye)"	Various artists	Emilio Estefan	None	2001	
"Te Dejo Madrid"	None	W.I.Z.	Laundry Service	2002	
"Underneath Your Clothes"	None	Herb Ritts	Laundry Service	2002	
"Objection (Tango)" "Te Aviso, Te Anuncio (Tango)" (Spanish version)	None	Dave Meyers	Laundry Service	2002	
"Que Me Quedes Tú"	None	Esteban Sapir; Ramiro Agulla	Laundry Service	2002	
"The One"	None	Esteban Sapir; Ramiro Agulla	Laundry Service	2002	
"La Tortura"	Alejandro Sanz	Michael Haussman	Fijación Oral, Vol. 1	2005	
"La Tortura" (Shaketon Remix)	Alejandro Sanz	Michael Haussman	Fijación Oral, Vol. 1	2005	
"No"	Gustavo Cerati	Jaume de Laiguana	Fijación Oral, Vol. 1	2005	
"Don't Bother"	None	Jaume de Laiguana	Oral Fixation, Vol. 2	2005	
"Día de Enero"	None	Jaume de Laiguana	Fijación Oral, Vol. 1	2006	
"Hips Don't Lie"	Wyclef Jean	Sophie Muller	Oral Fixation, Vol. 2	2006	
"Illegal" •	Carlos Santana	Shakira; Jaume de Laiguana	Oral Fixation, Vol. 2	2006	
"Beautiful Liar"	Beyoncé	Jake Nava	B'Day	2006	
"Te Lo Agradezco, Pero No"	Alejandro Sanz	Jaume de Laiguana	El Tren de los Momentos	2006	
"Las de la Intuición" •	None	Shakira; Jaume de Laiguana	Fijación Oral, Vol. 1	2007	
"Hay Amores"	None	Vincent Passeri	Love in the Time of Cholera	2008	
"She Wolf" "Loba" (Spanish version)	None	Jake Nava	She Wolf	2009	
"Did It Again" "Lo Hecho Está Hecho" (Spanish version)	None	Sophie Muller	She Wolf	2009	
"Did It Again" (remix)	Kid Cudi	Sophie Muller	She Wolf	2009	
"Give It Up to Me"	Lil Wayne	Sophie Muller	She Wolf	2009	
"Gypsy" "Gitana" (Spanish version)	None	Jaume de Laiguana	She Wolf	2010	
"Waka Waka (This Time for Africa)" "Waka Waka (Esto es Africa)" (Spanish version)	Freshlyground	Marcus Raboy	Listen Up! The Official 2010 FIFA World Cup Album	2010	
"Loca" "Loca" (Spanish version)	Dizzee Rascal or El Cata	Jaume de Laiguana; Dizzee Rascal or El Cata	Sale el Sol	2010	
"Sale el Sol"	None	Jaume de Laiguana; Dizzee Rascal or El Cata	Sale el Sol	2010	
"Rabiosa" "Rabiosa" (Spanish version)	El Cata or Pitbull	Jaume de Laiguana; Dizzee Rascal or El Cata	Sale el Sol	2011	
"Todos Juntos"	Dora the Explorer	Unknown	We Did It! Dora's Greatest Hits	2011	
"Addicted to You"	None	Anthony Mandler	Sale el Sol	2012	
"Get It Started"	Pitbull	David Rosseau	Global Warming	2012	
"Can't Remember to Forget You"	Rihanna	Joseph Kahn	Shakira	2014	
"Nunca Me Acuerdo de Olvidarte"	None	Joseph Kahn	Shakira	2014	
"Empire"	None	Jonathan Craven; Darren Craig; Jeff Nicholas	Shakira	2014	
"Dare (La La La)" "La La La" (Spanish version)	None	Anthony Mandler	Shakira	2014	
"La La La (Brazil 2014)" "La La La (Brasil 2014)" (Spanish version)	Carlinhos Brown	Jaume de Laiguana	Shakira	2014	
"Mi Verdad"	Maná	Jaume de Laiguana	Cama Incendiada	2015	
"Try Everything"	None	Byron Howard; Rich Moore; Jared Bush	Zootopia (OST)	2016	
"La Bicicleta"	Carlos Vives	Jaume de Laiguana	El Dorado	2016	
"Chantaje"	Maluma	Jaume de Laiguana	El Dorado	2016	
"Deja Vu"	Prince Royce	Jaume de Laiguana	El Dorado	2017	
"Comme Moi"	Black M	Jaume de Laiguana	El Dorado	2017	
"Me Enamoré"	None	Shakira; Jaume de Laiguana	El Dorado	2017	
"Perro Fiel"	Nicky Jam	Jaume de Laiguana	El Dorado	2017	
"Trap"	Maluma	Jaume de Laiguana	El Dorado	2018	
"Clandestino"	Maluma	Jaume de Laiguana	None	2018	
"Nada"	None	Jaume de Laiguana	El Dorado	2018	
"Me Gusta"	Anuel AA	Drew Kirsch	None	2020	
"Girl Like Me"	Black Eyed Peas	Rich Lee	Translation	2020	
"Don't Wait Up" "Don't Wait Up" (alternate version)	None	Warren Fu	None	2021	
"Te Felicito" "Te Felicito" (alternate version)	Rauw Alejandro	Jaume de Laiguana	Las Mujeres Ya No Lloran	2022	
"Don't You Worry"	Black Eyed Peas, David Guetta	Director X	Elevation	2022	
"Monotonía" •	Ozuna	Shakira; Jaume de Laiguana	Las Mujeres Ya No Lloran	2022	
"Shakira: Bzrp Music Sessions, Vol. 53"	Bizarrap	Pedro Colmeiro	Las Mujeres Ya No Lloran	2023	
"TQG"	Karol G	Pedro Artola	Las Mujeres Ya No Lloran	2023	
"Acróstico" •	None	Shakira; Jaume de Laiguana	Las Mujeres Ya No Lloran	2023	
"Copa Vacía" •	Manuel Turizo	Shakira; Jaume de Laiguana	Las Mujeres Ya No Lloran	2023	
"El Jefe"	Fuerza Regida	Jora Frantzis	Las Mujeres Ya No Lloran	2023	
"Puntería"	Cardi B	Hannah Lux Davis	Las Mujeres Ya No Lloran	2024	
"(Entre Paréntesis)”	Grupo Frontera	Mike Ho	Las Mujeres Ya No Lloran	2024	
"Soltera"	None	Jaume de Laiguana	None	2024	
"Última" •	None	Shakira; Jaume de Laiguana	Las Mujeres Ya No Lloran	2025	
"Bésame"	Alejandro Sanz	Jaume de Laiguana	¿Y Ahora Qué?	2025	
"Zoo"	None	Hannah Lux Davis	Zootopia 2	2025	
Algo Tú	Beéle	Shakira; Jaume de Laiguana	None	2026	
Choka Choka	Anitta		Equilibrium	2026	
Dai Dai	Burna Boy	Hannah Lux Davis	Official FIFA World Cup 2026 Album	2026	

=== Unreleased music videos ===
Title	Director(s)	Year	Description	Ref.
"I Am Here"	Christophe Gstalder	1996	Filmed at the same session as the Estoy Aquí (Europe Mix) music video.	
"Eyes Like Yours"	Mark Kohr	1999	Filmed at the same session as the Ojos Así music video.	
"Quiero Más"	Jaume de Laiguana	2006	Parts of the music video were used on a Panasonic stereo commercial. The full music video was posted on the director's website.	
"Eurosummer (Girls Trip)"		2026		

== Video albums ==
Year	Video details	Certifications
2000	MTV Unplugged: Released: February 29, 2000; Label: Sony Music; Formats: CD/DVD; Live DVD	RIAA certification: Gold (50,000)
2004	Live & off the Record: Released: March 30, 2004; Label: Epic; Format: CD/DVD; Documentary and Live DVD	ARIA certification: Gold (7,500); BVMI certification: 3× Gold (75,000); RIAA certification: Gold (50,000); SNEP certification: Gold (10,000)
2007	Oral Fixation Tour: Released: November 12, 2007; Label: Epic; Format: CD/DVD; Live DVD	Pro-Música Brasil certification: Platinum (30,000); PROMUSICAE certification: 2× Platinum (50,000); RIAA certification: Platinum (100,000)
2011	Live From Paris: Released:December 6, 2011; Label: Epic; Format: CD/DVD; Live DVD	SNEP certification: Platinum (15,000); ZPAV certification: Gold (5,000)
2019	Shakira In Concert: El Dorado World Tour: Released: November 13, 2019; Label: Sony Music; Format: Streaming	

== Filmography ==
=== Television ===
Year	Title	Role	Notes
1994	El oasis	Luisa Maria Rico	
2002	Popstars Brazil	Mentor assistant	Season 1
2002	Taina	Herself	Episode: "Abuelo Knows Best"
2005	7 vidas	Herself	Episode: "Todo por las pastis"
2009	Ugly Betty	Herself	Episode: "The Bahamas Triangle"
2010	Wizards of Waverly Place	Herself (Uncle Kelbo as her)	Episode: "Dude Looks Like Shakira"
2013–2014	The Voice	Coach / Mentor	Season 4 and 6
2014	Dreamland	Herself	Episode: "3"
2020	Global Goal: Unite for Our Future	Herself	Television special
2020	The Disney Family Singalong: Volume II	Herself	Television special
2022	Dancing with Myself	Herself	TV show
2022	Zootopia+	Gazelle	Archival recordings, Episode: "So You Think You Can Prance"
2025	Domingão com Huck	Herself / special participant	

=== Films ===
Year	Title	Role	Notes
2002	Shakira: The Documentary Film	Herself	Documentary
2007	Pies Descalzos Foundation	Herself	Documentary
2011	Hagamos que Salga El Sol	Herself	Documentary
2011	A Day with Shakira	Herself	Documentary
2016	Zootopia	Gazelle	voice role
2020	Miss Americana	Herself	Documentary
2022	Jennifer Lopez: Halftime	Herself	Documentary
2025	Zootopia 2	Gazelle	voice role

== See also ==
- Shakira discography
- List of songs recorded by Shakira
- List of awards and nominations received by Shakira
- List of Shakira concert tours
