= List of Shakira records and achievements =

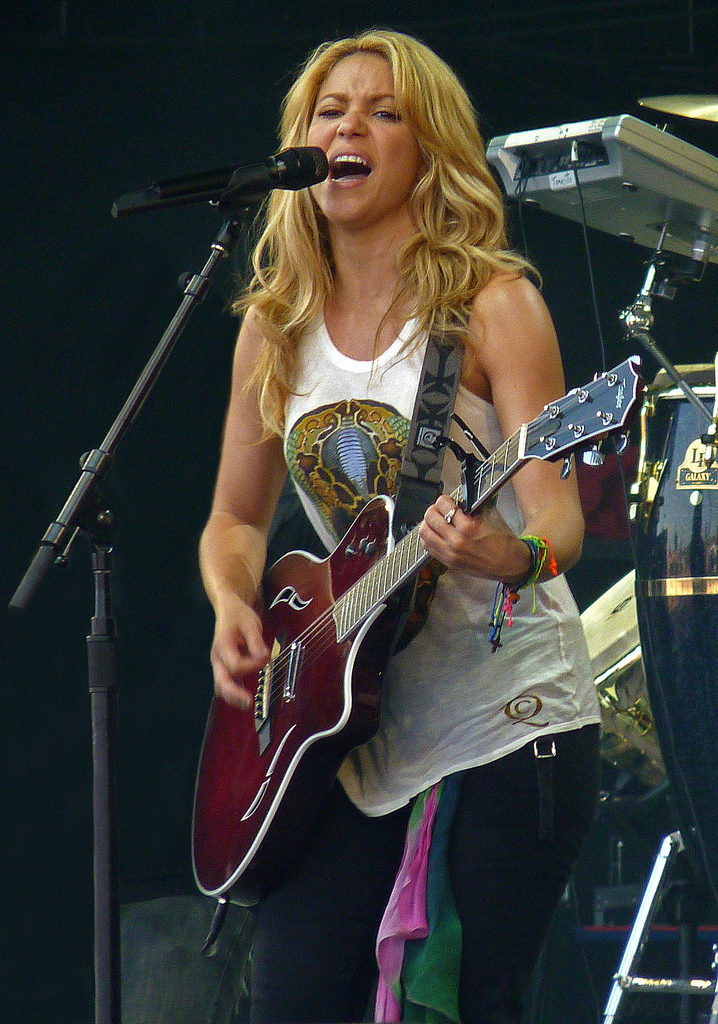
Shakira is considered the greatest Latin artist ever offered by Latin America for her achievements, success, impact and legacy.

Colombian singer Shakira, throughout her career, spanning three decades, has obtained numerous statistical achievements, setting and breaking several world records for a Latin artist through her participation in entrepreneurial activities, acting, and performances in the musical scene for her videos, singles, albums, and tours.

She is best-selling Latin female artist of all time.

== Global records and achievements for a Latin Artist ==
Key
×	Denotes record broken by another artist
+	Denotes record tied by another artist

Record	Notes
Most successful latin female solo artist	Based on her global reach and sales, she was listed by the media as "The most successful Latin female artist of all time".
Best-selling female latin artist	Based on her worldwide certifications, Shakira has become the best-selling Latin female artist of all time.
Best-selling album by a Latina artist	Sales of her album "Servicio de Lavandería" exceed 13 million, making this the best-selling album by a Latina.
Best-selling remix album by a female latin artist	Shakira is the only Latina to achieve it with her album "The Remixes" which sold more than 500,000 copies until 2005.
Best selling latin pop album of the 2000 in the US	Shakira with her album "Fijación Oral, Vol. 1" managed to obtain the record for the best-selling latin pop album of the 2000 in the US.
The most watched Super Bowl halftime show on YouTube of all time	The 2020 Super Bowl is to date the most watched halftime show in YouTube history with over 200 million views to date.
Latin song topping charts in the most countries	Her 2006 song "Hips Don't Lie" topped the charts in 50 countries, a feat never seen before for a Latin artist.
The best-selling merengue song in history.	Her song Loca is to date the best-selling Merengue song of all time.
The best-selling World Cup song of all time	The song "Waka Waka" became the best-selling World Cup song of all time with 10 million total sales.
The first Latina to sing a song in Spanish at the MTV	On the VMAS stage, Shakira appeared with Alejandro Sanz to present her song "La Tortura", this being the first time that a Latina had accomplished a feat like this.
The only Latin artist to have 1 song above 100 Million streams in 4 decades.	In 2020, Shakira set the record for being the first to achieve it with her songs "Inevitable", "Hips Don't Lie", "Waka Waka" and "Me Gusta" which reached 100 million on both Spotify and YouTube.
Album by a Latina artist topping charts in most countries	Her album Laundry Service reached the first position in 13 different countries, no album by a Latin had achieved such a feat.
Highest debut position for a Spanish-language album on the Billboard 200 ×	Her album "Fijación Oral Vol 1" had the best debut performance for an album in Spanish, a record that was later broken by Bad Bunny and his album "El último tour del mundo"
The first Latin female artist to hold the number 1 on European Top 100 Albums	Thanks to her successful crossover "Laundry Service" Shakira became the first Latin female artist to occupy the number 1 position on the European Hot 100 Albums
The most played female Latin album of all time	In 2017, she released her album El Dorado, which became the most streamed album by a Latin female artist in history and one of the most streamed albums of all time, with over 10 billion streams.
The first Latin artist to win a Grammy Album of the Year	Shakira made history in 2006 when she won the Latin Grammy for album of the year, being the first Latina to do so.
The only artist from South America to reach the number-one spot on the U.S. Billboard Hot 100, the Australian ARIA chart, and the UK Singles Chart.	She accomplished this feat with her song "Hips Don't Lie."
The first Latin female artist to enter the top 10 of IFPI	In 2002, Shakira became the first Latin female artist to enter the top 10 of the IFPI thanks to her album "Laundry Service".
The Most Downloaded Latin Artist	In 2010 According to Nokia research, Shakira had amassed more music downloads in the last year than any other Latin artist in history.
The highest streamed Latin artist	In 2018, Spotify included Shakira in the list of top 10 most streamed female artists of the decade on the platform, making her the highest streamed Latin artist.
The highest debut for a song in Spanish in the history of Spotify	In 2023, Shakira's Session #53 with Bizarrap achieved 14.4 million streams or reproductions in 24 hours on Spotify, thus making it the biggest debut in the history of music in Spanish on that platform.
The most awarded latin album of all time	Her album "Las Mujeres Ya No Lloran" surpassed 100 awards, making it the most awarded Latin album in history.
The first person to reach 100 million likes on Facebook	In 2014, the Colombian artist became the first person to reach 100 million likes on Facebook.
The female latin artist with most Latin Grammys ×	Shakira is the biggest winner among female artists with a total of 16 Latin Grammy Awards. Behind her are Julieta Venegas and Natalia Lafourcade, both with 10 Latin Grammy Awards. Currently Natalia is the holder of this record.
Highest-grossing concert tour of all time by a female latin artist	Shakira's Oral Fixation Tour is to date the highest grossing tour by a Latin female artist overall with earnings of nearly $90 million grossed over 119 dates.

== Records and achievements as a Latin artist in the continents ==
=== North America ===
×	Denotes record broken by another artist
+	Denotes record tied by another artist

==== USA, Canada and Mexico ====
Country	Record title/Achievements	Notes
United States	Best Selling Latin Female Artist in USA (United States)	Shakira with 39.14 million certified sales without updating is the best-selling Latin artist in the history of the United States.
United States	Latin female artist with the highest Gold, Platinum and Multi-Platinum album certifications	Shakira is the Latin female artist with the highest Gold, Platinum and Multi-Platinum album certifications in the United States.
United States	The first Latin female artist to have a presentation completely in Spanish broadcast in the USA	Her 1999 MTV Unplugged performance became the first all-Spanish show to be broadcast in the United States.
United States	The first South American artist to reach the top position of the Billboard Hot 100	Shakira became the first South American in history to reach the prestigious first place on the Billboard Hot 100 list.
United States	Longest running song at No. 1 on Billboard's Hot Latin Songs ×	Her song "La Tortura" at one time held the record for Billboard's Hot Latin Tracks chart, appearing at number-one more than any other single with a total of 25 non-consecutive weeks, a record currently held by the Luis Fonsi song "Despacito" with 56 weeks
United States	The Latin artist with the largest upward movement in a single week	Shakira obtained this record with her song in collaboration with Beyoncé which jumped from position 94 to 3.
United States	The best performing Latin artist on all Billboard charts	Shakira is the top performing Latin artist on all of Billboard's Latin and Overall charts.
United States	The Latin female artist who has raised the most money in USA	According to the numbers reported by Billboard Boxscore, the Latin star has raised 7.9 million dollars for her personal account, thanks to the 69,552 tickets sold in the United States. It averages 1.28 million dollars per concert through the 18 presentations that it had in North America.
United States	The best performing South American female artist on the Billboard Hot 100 chart.	Shakira is the best-performing South American female artist on the chart with a total of twenty-two songs on the chart, four top 10s and one number 1.
United States	Most Certificated female latin artist in USA (United States)	Shakira held the record for the Latin female artist with the most certifying amount in the United States, with a total number of 38.22 million sales.
United States	The Latin female artist with the most No. 1 on the Billboard Latin Airplay chart	Shakira to date has a number of 15 No. 1 songs on the Billboard Latin Airplay chart, being the Latin female artist with the most No. 1s on that chart.
Canada	Best Selling Latin Female Artist in Canada	Shakira currently has 4,090,000 certified sales in Canada, making her the best-selling Latin female artist of all time in the country. She is also one of the top 15 best female seller in Canada.
Canada	Latin female artist with the most #1 singles on the "Canadian Digital Songs" chart	This record was obtained with his songs "Beautiful Liar" and "Hips don't Lie"
Mexico	The best-selling female artist Mexico's history	Shakira has 10.36 million sales in Mexico, this being the highest number for a female artist.
Mexico	Record for the highest attendance at a concert in Mexico	She broke the record for attendance at a concert in the Zócalo of the Mexican capital, the largest square in America, having gathered 400,000 people in March 2026.

==== Billboard Charts statistics ====
When she reached number one with "Hips Don't Lie" in 2006 on the Billboard Hot 100, Shakira became the first South American artist to achieve number one on the Hot 100 in history. In addition, when she released her collaboration "Girl Like Me" in 2021, she became the second Latin artist with singles within the Billboard Hot 100 in 3 different decades only behind Gloria Estefan and the first South American to achieve it. It currently has the best performance on all Billboard charts around the world. To be the Latin with the most No. 1 in Latin Airplay and to be the South American with the best performance in the Top Latin Albums list and the second Latin only behind Selena. She is currently the second Latin female artist with the most No. 1s on the list with 13, only behind Gloria Estefan who has 15, although she is the Latin female artist with the most songs on this list. In 2022, Shakira became the first artist Latin female artist to debut a Spanish song in the top 10 of the Hot 100 with Shakira: Bzrp Music Sessions, Vol. 53, 2 months later she extended her own record and became the first female Latin artist to debut 2 Spanish songs in the top 10 of the American chart with TQG.

Shakira's number-one singles on the Billboard Hot Latin Songs
1. 1990s: 2 singles (15.4%)
2. 2000s: 6 single (46.1%)
3. 2010s: 3 single (23.1%)
4. 2020s: 2 singles (15.4%)

Shakira's top 10 singles on the Billboard Hot Latin Songs chart
- 1996: "Estoy Aquí" #02
- 1996: "¿Dónde Estás Corazón?" #05
- 1997: "Se quiere, se mata" #08
- 1998: "Ciega, sordomuda" #01
- 1999: "Tú" #01
- 1999: "Inevitable" #03
- 2000: "No creo" #09
- 2001: "Suerte" #01
- 2002: "Que me quedes tú" #01
- 2005: "La Tortura" #01
- 2006: "Te Lo Agradezco, Pero No" #01
- 2006: "Hips Don't Lie" #01
- 2007: "Bello Embustero" #10
- 2009: "Loba" #01
- 2009: "Lo hecho está hecho" #06
- 2010: "Gitana" #06
- 2010: "Waka Waka" #02
- 2010: "Loca" #01
- 2011: "Sale el sol" #10
- 2011: "Rabiosa" #08
- 2012: "Addicted To You" #09
- 2014: "Nunca Me Acuerdo de Olvidarte" #06
- 2015: "Mi Verdad" #01
- 2014: "La Bicicleta" #02
- 2016: "Chantaje" #01
- 2017: "Deja Vu" #04
- 2017: "Me enamoré" #04
- 2017: "Perro Fiel" #06
- 2018: "Clandestino" #07
- 2020: "Me Gusta" #06
- 2022: "Monotonía" #03
- 2023: "Shakira: Bzrp Music Sessions, Vol. 53" #01
- 2023: "TQG" #01

=== South America ===
Record title/Achievements	Notes
The Best Selling Latin female artist in Brazil	Shakira has more than 5 million certified sales in Brazil, being one of the top 10 best selling international female singers in the country.
The best-selling Colombian and Latin female artist in the history of music	With more than 100 million certified records sold, she is considered the best-selling Colombian artist of all time..
The most screened documentary of a Latina in the history of Latin America	She achieved this record with her documentary "El Dorado World Tour" which was presented in 2,000 theaters in 60 countries.
The most successful Latin female artist in all of Latin America	Shakira is the most successful and important Latin artist in Latin territory and is the fifth Latin artist in general behind Julio Iglesias and more.
The Best Selling Latin female artist in Argentina	Shakira has more than 1,455,000 certified sales in Argentina, being the best-selling Latin woman.
The Latin female artist with the most songs and albums on the Latin American charts	Her albums and songs in Spanish have entered the majority of Latin American charts, it can be verified in the respective lists of her discography.

Shakira to date has become the Latin woman with the largest number of songs and albums in Latin American territory. From her album "Pies Descalzos" to "El Dorado" positioning herself in the top 10 or in the first place in various markets such as Venezuela, Colombia, Brazil, Chile, Argentina and several more.

=== Europe, Asia, Oceania and Africa ===
Continent	Record title/Achievements	Notes
Asia	The first Latin female artist to reach number 1 on the Billboard Japan Hot 100 Overseas	Her song "Try Everything" managed to reach number 1 on the Billboard Japan Overseas while on the Billboard Japan Hot 100 it reached the top 30.
Asia	The best-selling album of all time in Turkey	Her album "Laundry Service" thanks to its high sales in the territory became the best-selling album in the history of Turkey.
Asia	Best-selling Latin female artist in Asian history	Shakira holds certifications in India, Middle East, Hong Kong, Singapore, Taiwan and Turkey and also sales confirmed by South Korean and Japanese music certification entities. Shakira, to date, holds the record for the best-selling Latin female artist in Asian history.
Asia	The first Latin artist to perform in the Chinese New Year	Shakira in 2010 finishing her tour "The Sun Comes Out World Tour" was invited to perform at the Chinese New Year, in Nanjing, China. She's also the highest paid artist of all time.
Oceania	The Best selling latin female artist of all time in Australia	Shakira has 1,760,000 certified sales in Australia, making her the best selling latin female artist of all time in the country, the second being Jennifer Lopez.
Oceania	The Latin female artist with the most No. 1 in Australian singles chart	Shakira has a total of 3 songs at the top of the Australia song chart
Oceania	The Latin female artist with the most weeks on the No. 1 spot in Australian singles charts	Shakira has a total of 16 weeks at the top of the Australia song chart, 9 weeks with Hips Don't Lie, 6 weeks with Whenever Wherever and 1 week with Underneath Your Clothes. They are all No.1 debut singles.
Oceania	The Best selling latin female artist of all time in New Zealand	Shakira has 345,0000 certified sales in New Zealand, making her the best selling latin female artist of all time in the country.
Europe	The first Latin female artist to perform at Glastonbury	Shakira in 2010 appeared before 150,000 people at the Glastonbury festival, being the first Latin American and South American to achieve it.
Europe	The first song entirely in Spanish to be certified in the United Kingdom	Shakira achieved this record thanks to her song Chantaje, which certified Silver in 2019, being the first and only Spanish song by a female Latin artist to achieve it.
Europe	The only latin female artist to have 2 songs on UK Top 50 decade chart	Shakira is one of the only two female artists (the other one being Lady Gaga), the only latin female artist to have two songs on the UK Top 50 decade chart in the 2000s with Whenever Wherever at 38 and Hips Don't Lie at 46.
Europe	Best-selling Latin female artist in the UK	Shakira has 8.1 million certified records in the UK alone, making her the best-selling Latin female artist of all time there.
Europe	First Latin female artist to be nominated for a Brit Award	In 2009 Shakira was nominated for these awards, being the first Latin American to be so.
Europe	Best-selling Latin female artist in France	Shakira has 5.7 million certified records in France alone, making her the best-selling Latin female artist of all time there. She's also one of the top 10 most certified female artist of all time in the country.
Europe	The Latin female artist with the most No. 1 in French singles charts	Shakira has a total of 5 songs at the top of the French song charts
Europe	The best selling English song in France in 2000s	Shakira's Diamond certified single Whenever Wherever ranked as 16th best selling song in the country in 2000s. The song is also the best selling English single in the country is 2000s.
Europe	The Latin female artist with the most No. 1 in Hungary singles charts	Shakira has a total of 6 songs at the top of the Hungarian song charts making her the female latin artist with the most number 1s in that territory.
Europe	The Latin female artist with the most No. 1 in Italian singles charts	Shakira has a total of 6 songs at the top of the Italian song charts making her the female latin artist with the most number 1s in that territory.
Europe	The Latin female artist with the most No. 1 in Ireland singles charts	Shakira has a total of 4 songs at the top of the Ireland song charts making her the female latin artist with the most number 1s in that territory.
Europe	The Latin female artist with the most No. 1 in Dutch singles charts	Shakira has a total of 4 songs at the top of the Dutch song charts making her the female latin artist with the most number 1s in that territory.
Europe	The Latin female artist with the most No. 1 in UK singles charts	Shakira has a total of 2 songs at the top of the UK song charts making her the female latin artist with the most number 1s in that territory.
Europe	The Latin female artist with the most No. 1 in Danish singles charts +	Shakira has a total of 1 song at the top of the Danish song charts making her the female latin artist with the most number 1s in that territory. She only shares the title with Camila Cabello
Europe	The Latin female artist with the most No. 1 in Czech Republic singles charts	Shakira has a total of 3 songs at the top of the Czech Republic song charts making her the female latin artist with the most number 1s in that territory.
Europe	The Latin female artist with the most No. 1 in Spanish singles charts	Shakira has a total of 12 songs at the top of the Spanish song charts making her the female latin artist with the most number 1s in that territory.
Europe	Best-selling female artist in Spain	Shakira has 6.71 million certified records in Spain alone, making her the best-selling female artist of all time in the country.
Europe	Best-selling Latin female artist in Germany	Shakira has 6.4 million certified records in Germany alone, making her the best-selling Latin female artist of all time in the country. She's also one of the top 10 most certified female artists of all time in the country.
Europe	The Latin female artist with the most No. 1 in Swiss singles charts	Shakira has a total of 5 songs at the top of the Swiss song charts making her the female latin artist with the most number 1s in that territory.
Europe	The best selling Latin female artist in Switzerland	Shakira has 895,000 certified sales in Switzerland, making her the 3rd best female seller in the country after Madonna and Celine Dion (the 1st latin female artist).
Africa	Highest attendance at Egyptian concert ×	Setting the record for the highest attendance in Egyptian concert history at the time, Shakira was able to bring in 100,000 attendees at the Egyptian Pyramids plateau in just one night
Africa	The first Latina to certify a record in Africa	Shakira certified in Africa in 2001 thanks to her album Laundry Service. She became the first Latina to do so.

== See also ==
- List of best-selling albums of the 21st century
