= Tour Pies Descalzos =

1996–97 concert tour by Shakira

- Tour by Shakira
- Associated album: Pies Descalzos
- Start date: October 6, 1995
- End date: October 10, 1997
- Legs: 3
- No. of shows: Around 100

Shakira concert chronology
- Tour Pies Descalzos (1995–1997); Tour Anfibio (2000)

The Tour Pies Descalzos was the debut concert tour by Colombian singer-songwriter Shakira, launched to promote her third studio album Pies descalzos (1995). She visited many Latin American venues and some in the United States and Spain. The tour began on 6 October 1995 in Bogotá, Colombia and concluded on 10 October 1997 in Bogotá. The long series of highly popular performances on three continents contributed to the establishment of Shakira as a major international artist early in her career. Unlike her later tours, this one was not organized from the beginning as a single, continuous series of events.

== History ==
Shakira had her first official concert on 6 October 1995, the date of the release of the Pies Descalzos album, in Teatro Nacional La Castellana in Bogotá. She started performing in black boots, but kicked them off before singing "Pies Descalzos, Sueños Blancos" ('bare feet, white dreams').

On the tour, Shakira performed songs from Pies Descalzos and, only in Colombia, songs from her earlier albums, "Tú Serás la Historia de Mi Vida" from Peligro (1993) and the title track of the album Magia (1991). On 1 March 1996 in Bogotá, more than 50,000 people in the audience enthusiastically applauded her performance, anointing Shakira as Colombia's top musical phenomenon. The 1996 concerts in Ecuador were filmed and broadcast on national television. Among high-attendance recorded performances were also the shows in Mexico City (including on 22 November 1996 at Auditorio Nacional, attended by 10,000 spectators), and in Chile (part of the 1997 Viña del Mar International Song Festival). Luis Fernando Ochoa, co-author of songs on Pies Descalzos album, was responsible for music and artistic production during the tour, with Shakira's co-production. Besides singing, dancing and speaking to the assembled, Shakira played the guitar and, prominently at that time, harmonica. Her singing and movements reflected an "angry-young-woman-rock attitude", enthusiastically applauded by the audiences. "Vuelve" was the opening rock anthem salvo at concerts of the tour.

=== Stampede in Barranquilla ===
On 16 August 1996, Shakira had a concert in Barranquilla at Romelio Martínez Stadium, the first in her hometown, accompanied by Argentine rock band Vilma Palma e Vampiros. As hundreds of fans tried to enter the venue without tickets, a stampede resulted. Three people were killed and there were over one hundred injuries. In a separate incident, a girl committed suicide by ingesting cyanide in her house because her family did not allow her to attend the concert. Shakira, who was informed about what had happened only after the show, talked about the tragedy later in Brazil: "It was a very sad event in my life. There are never enough words to describe sad moments. Three people died at that show. It was quite difficult to accept, to assimilate. I found out after the concert was over. It was really, really hard. I even said that if something like that happened again, I wouldn't have the courage to go on stage again. I hope something like that never happens again, not in my career or in that of any other artist. It's not pleasant to remember."

== Set list ==
1. "Vuelve"
2. "Quiero"
3. "Un Poco de Amor"
4. "Te Espero Sentada"
5. "Pies Descalzos, Sueños Blancos"
6. "Pienso en Ti"
7. "Antología"
8. "Se Quiere, Se Mata"
9. “Estoy Aquí”
10. “Te Necesito”
11. "¿Dónde Estás Corazón?"
12. "Magia"
13. "Tú Serás la Historia de Mi Vida"

Notes

- "¿Dónde Estás Corazón?" was not performed on all dates.
- "Magia" and "Tú Serás la Historia de Mi Vida" were only performed in Colombia.

== Tour dates ==
Date	City	Country	Supporting act	Venue
Latin America
October 6, 1995	Bogotá	Colombia	—	Teatro Nacional La Castellana
November 30, 1995	Bucaramanga	Colombia	—	Coliseo Bicentenario
United States
February 3, 1996	Los Angeles	United States	—	The Garages
Latin America
February 28, 1996 (Note: Co-headlined by Shakira and Café Tacuba.)	Medellín	Colombia	Armando Manzanero	Plaza de Toros La Macarena
March 1, 1996 (Note: Co-headlined by Shakira and Café Tacuba.)	Bogotá	Colombia	Miguel Mateos	Estadio El Campín
March 2, 1996 (Note: Co-headlined by Shakira and Café Tacuba.)	Cali	Colombia	—	Coliseo El Pueblo
March 25, 1996	Caracas	Venezuela	—	Teatro Municipal of Caracas
March 27, 1996	Caracas	Venezuela	—	Poliedro de Caracas
March 28, 1996	Caracas	Venezuela	—	Poliedro de Caracas
March 29, 1996	Caracas	Venezuela	—	Poliedro de Caracas
March 30, 1996	Caracas	Venezuela	—	Súper Sábado Sensacional
April 10, 1996 (Note: Co-headlined by Shakira and Ricky Martin.)	Pereira	Colombia	—	Estadio Hernán Ramírez Villegas
April 11, 1996 (Note: Co-headlined by Shakira and Ricky Martin.)	Manizales	Colombia	—	Estadio Palogrande
April 12, 1996 (Note: Co-headlined by Shakira and Ricky Martin.)	Armenia	Colombia	—	Estadio San José
April 13, 1996 (Note: Co-headlined by Shakira and Ricky Martin.)	Ibagué	Colombia	Darío Gómez	Estadio Manuel Murillo Toro
April 17, 1996 (Note: Co-headlined by Shakira and Ricky Martin.)	Medellín	Colombia	Alejandro Martínez	Estadio Atanasio Girardot
April 18, 1996 (Note: Co-headlined by Shakira and Ricky Martin.)	Cali	Colombia	—	Estadio Olímpico Pascual Guerrero
May 26, 1996	Acapulco	Mexico	—	Forum Mundo Imperial
July 11, 1996	Quito	Ecuador	—	Coliseo General Rumiñahui
July 12, 1996	Guayaquil	Ecuador	—	Coliseo Voltaire Paladines Polo
July 13, 1996	Cuenca	Ecuador	—	Coliseo Mayor de Deportes
July 23, 1996	Caracas	Venezuela	—	Poliedro de Caracas
July 24, 1996	Caracas	Venezuela	—	Poliedro de Caracas
July 25, 1996	Porlamar	Venezuela	—	Explanada Santiago Mariño
July 28, 1996	Guatemala City	Guatemala	—	Estadio del Ejercito
July 29, 1996	San Salvador	El Salvador	—	Centro Internacional de Ferias y Convenciones
August 1, 1996	Lima	Peru	—	Feria del Hogar
August 2, 1996	Lima	Peru	—	Centro de Convenciones
August 14, 1996	Tegucigalpa	Honduras	—	Coliseo Nacional de Ingenieros
August 16, 1996	Barranquilla	Colombia	Vilma Palma e Vampiros	Estadio Romelio Martínez
August 17, 1996	Santa Marta	Colombia	Vilma Palma e Vampiros	Estadio de Base Ball Rafael Hernández Pardo
August 18, 1996	Cartagena	Colombia	Vilma Palma e Vampiros	Estadio Pedro de Heredia
August 21, 1996	Santo Domingo	Dominican Republic	—	Teatro La Fiesta
August 23, 1996	San Juan	Puerto Rico	—	Roberto Clemente Coliseum
United States
October 5, 1996	San Bernardino	United States	—	San Manuel Amphitheater
October 6, 1996	Los Angeles	United States	—	Gibson Amphitheater
Latin America
October 30, 1996	Lima	Peru	—	Estadio Universidad San Marcos
November 1, 1996	Cucuta	Colombia	—	Estadio General Santander
November 14, 1996	Medellín	Colombia	—	Estadio Atanasio Girardot
United States
November 17, 1996	New York City	United States	—	Beacon Theatre
Latin America
November 20, 1996	Mexico City	Mexico	—	Auditorio Nacional
November 21, 1996	Mexico City	Mexico	—	La Boom Disco
November 22, 1996	Mexico City	Mexico	—	Auditorio Nacional
November 23, 1996	Monterrey	Mexico	—	Auditorio Coca-Cola
November 27, 1996	Heredia	Costa Rica	—	Palacio de los Deportes
November 28, 1996	Guatemala City	Guatemala	—	Plaza de Toros Monumental
November 29, 1996	San Salvador	El Salvador	—	Gimnasio Nacional José Adolfo Pineda
November 30, 1996	Manaus	Brazil	—	Teatro Amazonas
December 1, 1996	Belém	Brazil	—	Theatro da Paz
December 2, 1996	Barretos	Brazil	—	Estádio Antônio Gomes Martins
December 3, 1996	Goiânia	Brazil	—	Estádio Antônio Accioly
December 4, 1996	Brasília	Brazil	—	Ginásio Nilson Nelson
December 5, 1996	Maringá	Brazil	—	Estádio Regional Willie Davids
December 6, 1996	Belo Horizonte	Brazil	—	Independência Stadium
December 7, 1996	Salvador	Brazil	—	Bahia Othon Palace
December 8, 1996	Recife	Brazil	—	Ginásio de Esportes Geraldo Magalhães
December 9, 1996	Belo Horizonte	Brazil	—	Ginásio Mineirinho
December 10, 1996	Florianópolis	Brazil	—	Estádio Orlando Scarpelli
Spain
February 4, 1997	Madrid	Spain	—	Raimundo Saporta Pavilion
February 6, 1997	Barcelona	Spain	—	Palau Sant Jordi
Latin America
February 19, 1997 (Note: Part of the Viña del Mar International Song Festival.)	Vina del Mar	Chile	—	Quinta Vergara
February 28, 1997	Bogotá	Colombia	—	Estadio El Campín
March 2, 1997	Santo André	Brazil	—	Clube Atlético Aramaçan
March 3, 1997	Sao Paulo	Brazil	—	Olympia
March 4, 1997	Sao Paulo	Brazil	—	Olympia
March 5, 1997	Santos	Brazil	—	Reggae Night
March 7, 1997	Sao Paulo	Brazil	—	Moinho Santo Antônio
March 9, 1997	Campinas	Brazil	—	Ginásio Guarani Futebol Clube
March 11, 1997	Santa Cruz	Bolivia	—	Estadio Ramón Tahuichi Aguilera
March 12, 1997	Curitiba	Brazil	—	Teatro Guaira
March 15, 1997	Caxias do Sul	Brazil	—	Teatro de Lona
March 20, 1997	Pelotas	Brazil	—	Associação Rural
March 21, 1997	Porto Alegre	Brazil	—	Gigantinho
March 22, 1997	Bage	Brazil	—	Ginásio Presidente Médici
March 23, 1997	Uruguaiana	Brazil	—	Ginásio Municipal
March 29, 1997	Campos do Jordão	Brazil	—	Kart Indoor Jardim Sul
April 3, 1997	Curitiba	Brazil	—	The Forum
April 4, 1997	Criciúma	Brazil	—	Estádio Engenheiro Mario Balsini
United States
April 11, 1997	Los Angeles	United States	—	Pantages Theatre
April 12, 1997	Miami	United States	—	Knight Center Complex
April 17, 1997	Chicago	United States	—	Aragon Ballroom
April 18, 1997	Houston	United States	—	Houston Music Hall
Latin America
July 31, 1997	Tegucigalpa	Honduras	—	Coliseo Nacional de Ingenieros
August 1, 1997	Managua	Nicaragua	—	Forum Mundo E
August 4, 1997	San Pedro Sula	Honduras	—	Estadio General Francisco Morazán
August 24, 1997	Barretos	Brazil	—	Parque do Peão de Barretos
August 28, 1997	Goiânia	Brazil	—	Clube Jaó
August 30, 1997	Brasilia	Brazil	—	Ginásio Nilson Nelson
September 5, 1997	Manaus	Brazil	—	Studio 5
September 7, 1997	Belém	Brazil	—	Assembléia Paraense
September 12, 1997	Novo Hamburgo	Brazil	—	Paschoal Charlemagne Theatre
September 13, 1997	Sao Paulo	Brazil	—	Olympia
September 17, 1997	Rio de Janeiro	Brazil	—	Metropolitan
September 19, 1997	Taubaté	Brazil	—	Associação de Taubaté
September 21, 1997	Sao Paulo	Brazil	—	Clube Esperia
September 27, 1997	Tigre	Argentina	—	Parque de la Costa
September 28, 1997	Tigre	Argentina	—	Parque de la Costa
October 10, 1997	Bogotá	Colombia	—	Estadio El Campín
