= Shakira in Concert: El Dorado World Tour =

Live album by Shakira
- Released: 13 November 2019
- Recorded: 28 August 2018
- Venues: The Forum, Inglewood, California
- Length: 130:00 (Film); 85:33 (Live album)
- Languages: Spanish; English
- Label: Sony Latin
- Directors: Shakira; James B. Merryman

Shakira chronology
El Dorado (2017)	Shakira in Concert: El Dorado World Tour (2019)	Las Mujeres Ya No Lloran (2024)

Shakira video chronology
Live from Paris (2011)	Shakira in Concert: El Dorado World Tour (2019)	Anniversary: Oral Fixation (20th) and Pies Descalzos (30th) Live (2025)

Singles from Shakira in Concert: El Dorado World Tour
- 1. "Chantaje (El Dorado World Tour Live)" Released: 7 November 2019

Shakira in Concert: El Dorado World Tour is the fifth live album by Colombian singer-songwriter Shakira. It was filmed at the Forum in Inglewood, California, where Shakira performed on 28 August 2018, as part of the North American leg of the El Dorado World Tour.

== Background and release ==
After the tickets of the North American leg of The El Dorado World Tour, which was launched to promote Shakira's eleventh studio album El Dorado (2017), were sold-out, she confirmed footage from the tour would be filmed and released and announced a show to be held at The Forum in Inglewood, California.

On 27 August 2018, Shakira posted a video and then made a survey on her Twitter account about which one of the three Balmain shirts she alternately wore during the first section of the concert would be chosen for a next tour date. The day after that, Hans Nelson, a tour crew member, posted on his Instagram account that indeed the two concerts to be held at The Forum, Los Angeles, California, would be taped for a future live DVD release. On the date of the rescheduled second show in the city, the singer herself confirmed through her social networks that the concert of that day would be recorded for a concert film. Soon after the tour ended, Shakira announced she has started the editing process of the tour DVD.

== Promotion ==
On 8 November 2019, Shakira confirmed the release of a live album on 13 November, along with the live version of "Chantaje" featuring Maluma as the album's lead single.

On November 13 and 15, 2019; a recording of the show in Los Angeles at The Forum was released in selected cinemas around the world.

== Critical reception ==
Nuria Net of Rolling Stone gave the film and live album a positive review calling it Shakira's "Triumphant Return to Singing". Net noted how the film was more directed towards Shakira's return and does not dwell too much on the painful episode of Shakira's vocal-cord hemorrhage injury.

Alex Stölk of Medium also gave the film and live album a positive review stating how Shakira "Shines Once Again".

== Awards ==
The movie received 5 nominations and won 2 awards at the 2020 NY TV Film Awards Shakira won 2 out of 5 awards in 2020.

Year	Ceremony	Award	Result
2020	New York Film Festival	Best Direction	Nominated
2020	New York Film Festival	Feature Documentaries	Nominated
2020	New York Film Festival	Music	Nominated
2020	New York Film Festival	Performing Arts Special	Won
2020	New York Film Festival	Special Event	Won

== Commercial performance ==
According to Pamela Bustios in an article for Billboard, "Shakira In Concert logged 2,000 SEA units, which equates to 2.9 million audio on-demand streams for its songs in its first tracking week." The same article also stated "The live album bows with a little over 2,000 equivalent album units earned in the week ending Nov. 14, according to Nielsen Music. Most of its initial sum stems from streaming activity."

== Track listing ==
Digital Download album
No.	Title	Length
1.	"Estoy Aquí/¿Dónde Estás Corazón? (Medley)"	5:05
2.	"She Wolf"	5:40
3.	"Si Te Vas"	4:12
4.	"Nada"	3:14
5.	"Perro Fiel/El Perdón (Medley)" (featuring Nicky Jam)	4:35
6.	"Underneath Your Clothes"	3:08
7.	"Me Enamoré"	2:51
8.	"Inevitable"	3:33
9.	"Chantaje" (featuring Maluma)	3:30
10.	"Whenever, Wherever"	6:21
11.	"Tú"	3:17
12.	"Amarillo"	4:14
13.	"La Tortura" (featuring Alejandro Sanz)	3:37
14.	"Antología"	4:03
15.	"Can't Remember to Forget You" (featuring Rihanna)	3:48
16.	"Loca/Rabiosa (Medley)"	3:26
17.	"La La La (Brazil 2014)/Waka Waka (This Time for Africa) (Medley)"	7:27 Encore
18.	"Toneladas"	1:50
19.	"Hips Don't Lie"	6:22
20.	"La Bicicleta" (with Carlos Vives)	5:20

== Charts ==
Chart (2019)	Peak position
US Soundtrack Albums (Billboard)	24
US Latin Pop Album (Billboard)	3
US Top Latin Albums (Billboard)	18
