= Anniversary: Oral Fixation (20th) and Pies Descalzos (30th) Live =

2025 live EP by Shakira

EP by Shakira
- Released: 22 October 2025
- Recorded: Power Station Studio A (New York City)
- Genre: Latin pop; pop rock
- Length: 16:09
- Label: Sony Latin
- Producer: Shakira; AC; Rafael Arcaute; Dave Clauss; Flambo

Shakira chronology
Las Mujeres Ya No Lloran (2024)	Anniversary: Oral Fixation (20th) and Pies Descalzos (30th) Live (2025)

Anniversary: Oral Fixation (20th) and Pies Descalzos (30th) Live (Note: Titled and stylized as Spotify Anniversary | Oral Fixation (20th) and Pies Descalzos (30th) LIVE on Spotify, and without the word "Spotify" on other platforms.) is a live extended play (EP) by Colombian singer-songwriter Shakira, released on 22 October 2025. The project serves as a retrospective triple-milestone celebration, marking the 30th anniversary of her breakthrough third studio album, Pies Descalzos (1995), alongside the 20th anniversary of her albums Fijación Oral, Vol. 1 and Oral Fixation, Vol. 2 (2005). Filmed as a Spotify Anniversary special, the EP features live recordings of five songs: "Antología", "Pies Descalzos, Sueños Blancos", "Día de Enero", "La Pared" and "Hips Don't Lie".

== Background and release ==
The year of 2025 marked the 30th anniversary of Shakira's third studio album Pies Descalzos (1995) and the 20th anniversary of Shakira's sixth and seventh studio albums Fijación Oral, Vol. 1 (2005) and Oral Fixation, Vol. 2 (2005). To honor and commemorate the anniversary, Shakira released a five-track EP on 22 October 2025, initially as a release exclusively on Spotify. The EP consists of five tracks: "Antología", "Pies Descalzos, Sueños Blancos", "Día de Enero", "La Pared", and "Hips Don't Lie" featuring Ed Sheeran and Beéle. The performances of the songs were filmed and recorded at Power Station Studio A in New York City.

== Composition ==
The new version of “La Pared” transforms the original track into an orchestral piece with a string arrangement performed by 14 women from the New York Philharmonic orchestra. The orchestra enters midway through the song. "Hips Don't Lie" features the orchestra as well, making the instrumental organic.

== Reception ==
According to Infobae, "La Pared" got "widespread applause" for "[Shakira's] vocal performance and for the orchestral accompaniment she added". Marcel Schlutt from Kaltblut Magazine called "Hips Don't Lie" the highlight of the EP, calling it a "powerful rendition" where "Shakira breathes new life into a classic that has defined her career and inspired countless generations."

== Track listing ==
No.	Title	Writer(s)	Producer(s)	Length
1.	"Pies Descalzos, Sueños Blancos"	Shakira; Luis Fernando Ochoa	Shakira; AC; Rafael Arcaute; Dave Clauss	3:04
2.	"Antología"	Shakira; Luis Fernando Ochoa	Shakira; AC; Rafael Arcaute; Dave Clauss	3:44
3.	"La Pared"	Shakira; Lester Mendez	Shakira; AC; Dave Clauss; Rafael Arcaute	2:59
4.	"Día de Enero"	Shakira	Shakira; AC; Rafael Arcaute; Dave Clauss	2:52
5.	"Hips Don't Lie" (featuring Ed Sheeran and Beéle)	Shakira; Wyclef Jean; LaTavia Parker; Beéle; Jerry Duplessis; Omar Alfanno; Luis Díazz	Shakira; AC; Rafael Arcaute; Dave Clauss; Flambo	3:28
Total length:				16:09
