= Donde Estas Corazon =

Donde Estas Corazon may refer to:

- ¿Dónde Estás Corazón?, a 1994 song by Colombian musician Shakira
- Donde Estás Corazón, a 1999 album by Mexican musician Pablo Montero
