= León Larregui =

Mexican musician

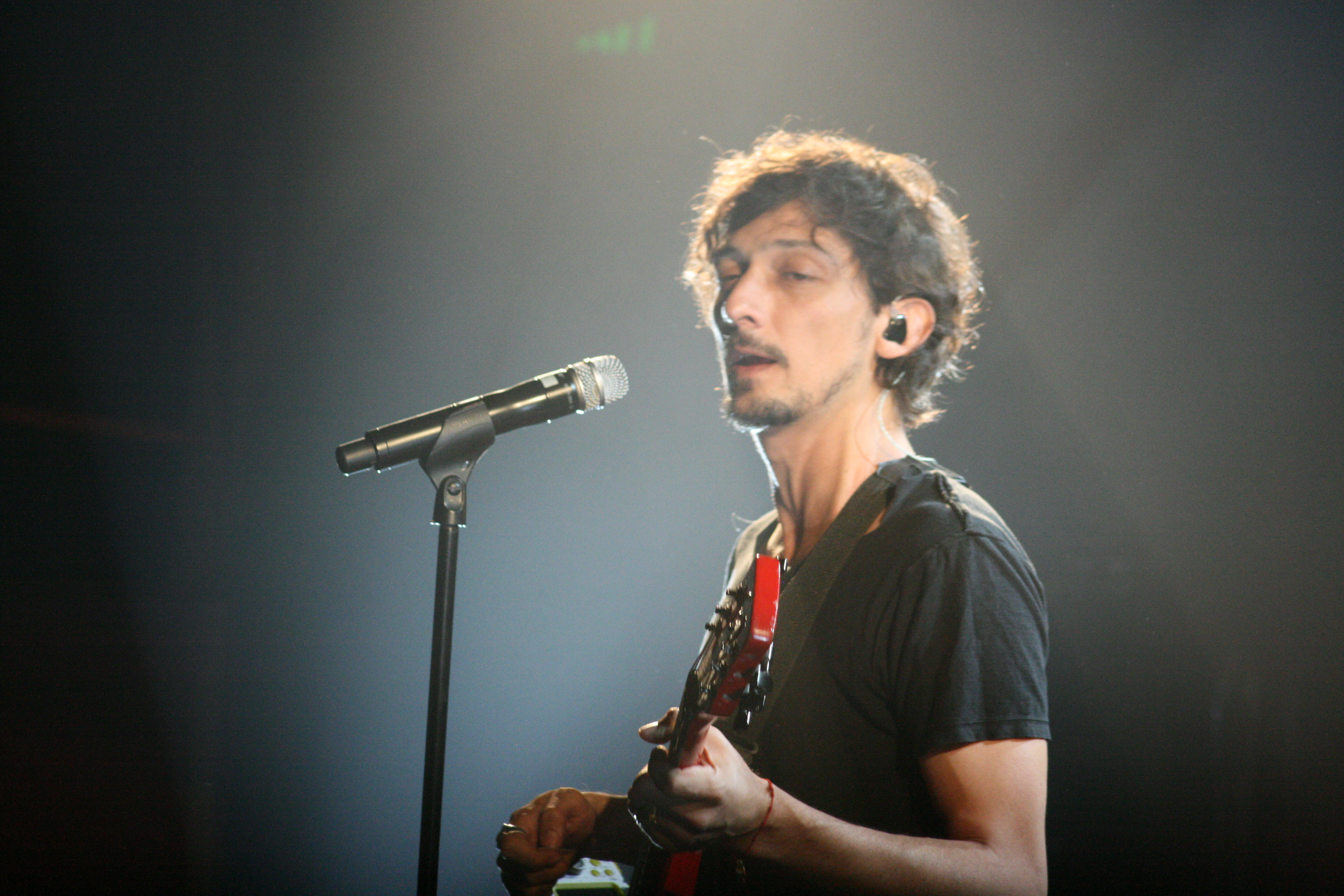

Background information
- Born: December 1, 1973 (age 52)
- Origin: Cuernavaca, Morelos, Mexico
- Genres: Alternative rock; neo-psychedelia; psychedelic rock; space rock
- Years active: 1993–present

León Rubén Larregui Marín (born December 1, 1973) is a Mexican singer, songwriter, and producer, best known as the lead vocalist of the Mexican band Zoé. As a solo artist, he has recorded three albums: in 2012 he released his debut album "Solstis", and four years later, in 2016, he released "Voluma". A year after releasing "Voluma", he reunited with Zoé to work on the album "Aztlán", which was released in 2018. Later, in 2021, Zoé released their most recent album, "Sonidos de Karmática Resonancia". In 2023, Larregui released "Prismarama", his latest solo album. Just days after its release, he began touring the album in the United States throughout the month of May, later continuing in Mexico, Colombia, and Ecuador.

== Early life ==
León Larregui is the first son of Rubén Larregui del Toro (January 11, 1943 – 2008) and María Jeannina Marín Tomassi (March 20, 1950 – March 8, 2014). Due to his father's job, the family moved frequently. Larregui spent his early years in Mexico City, then lived in Torreón, attended middle school in Cuernavaca, and later returned to Mexico City for university. Upon his return to Cuernavaca, he met Sergio Acosta, a musician from Torreón, with whom he would later team up to form what would become the band Zoé. He began studying Visual Arts at the National School of Painting, Sculpture, and Engraving "La Esmeralda." At that time, he worked as a graphic animator and was also involved in the art design for several films during that period. He appeared in the music video for the song "Se quiere, se mata" by Colombian singer Shakira, playing the role of Braulio.

== Career ==
On November 28, 1997, León Larregui, along with Sergio Acosta, Jesús Báez, and Ángel Mosqueda, formed the psychedelic rock band Zoé. The lyrics of their songs often revolve around spiritual exploration, with metaphoric references to the Universe (Larregui himself once explained that as a child he wanted to be an astronomer) and science fiction. This lyrical style has been difficult for some listeners to grasp. He also writes songs inspired by fictional stories he creates, anecdotes, films, books, or things he hears. In December 2011, he announced he would take a short break from Zoé but planned to resume work on the band's next album by mid-year, aiming for a 2013 release. After twenty years with Zoé, he began his solo career in 2012, clarifying that the band would continue.He explained his solo material would be different to avoid competing with the group's sound and announced a debut album for summer 2012. On July 10, the first single, "Como tú," was released on the radio. A new album called "Manifiesto de un Tremendo Delirio" is expected to be released in 2026, including a special vynil edition.

== Discography ==
- Solstis (2012)
- Voluma (2016)
- Volumixes (EP) (2016)
- Prismarama (2023)
- "Manifiesto de un Tremendo Delirio" (2026)
