= The Remixes (Shakira album) =

Remix album by Shakira
- Released: 21 October 1997
- Recorded: 1995–1997
- Genres: Latin pop; dance
- Length: 74:46
- Label: Sony Music Entertainment (Colombia)
- Producers: Shakira; Luis Fernando Ochoa; DJ Memê

Shakira chronology
Pies Descalzos (1995)	The Remixes (1997)	Dónde Están los Ladrones? (1998)

The Remixes is the first and only remix album by Colombian singer-songwriter Shakira, released on 21 October 1997 by Sony Music Colombia. It is composed of remixed versions of songs from her third studio album Pies Descalzos, with which she attained Latin American success two years prior. In addition to 9 extended tracks that utilize some of Pies Descalzos music in all-new arrangements and with many new vocals by Shakira, The Remixes contains 3 Pies Descalzos songs re-recorded by her in the Portuguese language.

Since its release, The Remixes, a classic example of electronic dance music, has become one of the best-selling remix albums of all time, and is the best-selling Latin remix album worldwide, with international sales exceeding 500,000 copies. It was certified 2× Platinum for shipments of 200,000 copies by the Recording Industry Association of America (RIAA).

== Track listing ==
All tracks produced by Shakira and Luis Fernando Ochoa.

No.	Title	Length
1.	"Shakira DJ Memêgamix"	6:21
2.	"Estoy Aquí" (Extended Remix)	9:31
3.	"Estou Aqui" (Portuguese version)	3:52
4.	"¿Dónde Estás Corazón?" (Dance Remix)	8:46
5.	"Un Poco de Amor" (12" Extended Dancehall Remix)	5:47
6.	"Um Pouco de Amor" (Portuguese version)	3:54
7.	"Pies Descalzos, Sueños Blancos" (Memê's Super Club mix)	8:42
8.	"Pés Descalços" (Portuguese version)	3:24
9.	"Estoy Aquí" (Timbalero Dub)	6:06
10.	"¿Dónde Estás Corazón?" (Dub-A-Pella mix)	6:40
11.	"Un Poco De Amor" (Memê's Jazz Experience mix)	4:41
12.	"Pies Descalzos, Sueños Blancos" (The Timbalero Dub 97)	6:38

Turkey reissue edition cassette
No.	Title	Length
5.	"Ojos Así" (Thunder Mix Radio Edit)	3:52
6.	"Pies Descalzos, Sueños Blancos" (Memê's Super Club mix)	8:42
7.	"Estoy Aquí" (Timbalero Dub)	6:06
8.	"¿Dónde Estás Corazón?" (Dub-A-Pella mix)	6:40
9.	"Un Poco De Amor" (Memê's Jazz Experience mix)	4:41
10.	"Pies Descalzos, Sueños Blancos" (The Timbalero Dub 97)	6:38

== Personnel ==
Names listed on The Remixes album cover:

- Shakira – vocals, producer
- Luis Fernando Ochoa – producer, remixing, keyboards and other instruments
- DJ Memê (Marcello Mansur) – remixing (of 7 tracks)
- Pablo Florez – remixing
- Jarvier Garza – remixing

== Charts ==
Chart (1997–1998)	Peak position
US Top Latin Albums (Billboard)	21
US Latin Pop Albums (Billboard)	9

== Certifications and sales ==
Region	Certification	Certified units/sales
United States (RIAA)	2× Platinum (Latin)	200,000^{^}
Summaries
Worldwide	—	500,000
^{^} Shipments figures based on certification alone.

== See also ==
- List of best-selling remix albums
