= Don't Wait Up (song) =

2021 single by Shakira

Single by Shakira
- Language: English
- Released: 16 July 2021
- Recorded: April 2021
- Genre: Electronic; dance; electropop; pop; house
- Length: 3:24
- Label: Sony Latin
- Songwriters: Shakira; Emily Warren; Ian Kirkpatrick
- Producers: Shakira; Ian Kirkpatrick

Shakira singles chronology
"Girl Like Me" (2020)	"Don't Wait Up" (2021)	"Te Felicito" (2022)

Music video
- "Don't Wait Up" on YouTube

"Don't Wait Up" is a song by Colombian singer-songwriter Shakira. It was released on July 16, 2021 through Spanish-language music label Sony Music Latin. The song marked Shakira's first all-English single since 2016's "Try Everything" and her first English-language single to not be released by a major general-market label.

== Background and release ==
Shakira initially announced that a single accompanied with a video would be released in July 2021, in the cover story of the July edition of Vogue Mexico. The singer first teased the single on 12 July, on her social media by changing her profile pictures to a summery color palette, the change resulted in the hashtag "Shakira is coming" to trend worldwide on Twitter. Upon the announcement along with the hashtag Shakira's name immediately started trending on Twitter's worldwide trends. On 13 July, the artist shared a 30-second video of what could potentially be the name and part of the lyrics of her future track. Later the same day Shakira revealed the cover artwork and its title.

== Reception ==
Laura English from Music Feeds encapsulated "Don't Wait Up" as "a club-ready banger with a classic EDM beat", calling the phrase "don't wait up" a "classic party line", and described how the song "starts as a slow burn featuring just Shakira’s iconic vocals" before "[building] into a modern-era Shakira bop once the chorus comes in though and the beat is delectable". Scott Croker from Idolator characterized how the song "starts slow being quickly speeding up and introducing listeners to an incredibly infectious and catchy chorus". The song was voted the favorite new music release of the week on a poll by Billboard.

== Music video ==
The music video for the song was released on 16 July 2021. Directed by Warren Fu, it was filmed on the Spanish island of Tenerife in June 2021. Its cinematography was handled by Carlos Veron. In the video, Shakira showcases her surfing skills and dance moves on the beach, with a choreography and style that hark back to her rise to fame in the late 90s.

== Credits and personnel ==
Credits adapted from Tidal.

- Shakira – vocals, songwriting, production
- Ian Kirkpatrick – songwriting, production, engineering, recording
- Emily Warren – songwriting, vocal production
- Adam Ayan – mastering
- Dave Clauss – mixing, engineering, recording, vocal production
- Josh Gudwin – mixing
- Andros Rodriguez – engineering, recording
- Roger Rodés – engineering, recording

== Charts ==
=== Weekly charts ===
Weekly chart performance for "Don't Wait Up"
Chart (2021)	Peak position
Argentina Airplay (Monitor Latino)	19
Belgium (Ultratop 50 Wallonia)	12
Bolivia (Monitor Latino)	16
Brazil (Top 10 Latino)	1
Brazil (Top 100 Airplay)	41
Chile Anglo (Monitor Latino)	8
CIS Airplay (TopHit)	193
Colombia Anglo (Monitor Latino)	1
Costa Rica Anglo (Monitor Latino)	5
Croatia (HRT)	31
Czech Republic Airplay (ČNS IFPI)	12
Dominican Republic Anglo (Monitor Latino)	6
Ecuador (Monitor Latino)	20
El Salvador (Monitor Latino)	10
France (SNEP)	45
Guatemala Anglo (Monitor Latino)	1
Honduras Anglo (Monitor Latino)	4
Hungary (Single Top 40)	36
Latin America Anglo (Monitor Latino)	6
Mexico (Billboard Mexican Airplay)	2
Panama (PRODUCE)	9
Panama (Monitor Latino)	13
Paraguay Anglo (Monitor Latino)	4
Peru Anglo (Monitor Latino)	13
Poland Airplay (ZPAV)	32
Russia Airplay (TopHit)	218
San Marino (SMRRTV Top 50)	27
UK Download (OCC)	95
Uruguay Anglo (Monitor Latino)	9
Venezuela Anglo (Monitor Latino)	6

=== Year-end charts ===
Year-end chart performance for "Don't Wait Up"
Chart (2021)	Position
Belgium (Ultratop Wallonia)	81
Bolivia (Monitor Latino)	94

== Certifications ==
Certifications and sales for "Don't Wait Up"
Region	Certification	Certified units/sales
Brazil (Pro-Música Brasil)	2× Platinum	80,000^{‡}
Colombia	Gold	
France (SNEP)	Platinum	200,000^{‡}
Poland (ZPAV)	Gold	25,000^{‡}
^{‡} Sales+streaming figures based on certification alone.
