= Un Poco de Amor =

- Artwork used for the US promotional maxi single remixes release

Single by Shakira

from the album Pies Descalzos
- Released: May 16, 1996
- Recorded: 1995
- Studio: Sonido Azulado Studio (Bogota, Colombia); Ocean V.U. Studio (Miami, FL)
- Genre: Latin rock; reggae
- Length: 4:04
- Label: Sony Music; Columbia
- Songwriters: Shakira; Luis Fernando Ochoa
- Producer: Luis Fernando Ochoa

Shakira singles chronology
"Pies Descalzos, Sueños Blancos" (1996)	"Un Poco de Amor" (1996)	"Antología" (1997)

Music video
- "Un Poco de Amor" on YouTube

"Un Poco de Amor" (English: A Little Love) is a song by Colombian singer-songwriter Shakira, taken from her third studio album Pies Descalzos. It was released on May 16, 1996, by Sony Music and Columbia Records as the fourth single from the album. The song was written and produced by Shakira and Luis Fernando Ochoa. "Un Poco de Amor" is a Latin pop song that incorporates reggae elements. Lyrically, it states that Shakira is waiting to find someone who loves her.

Upon its release, "Un Poco de Amor" received generally favorable reviews from music critics, who recognized it as a stand-out track from Pies Descalzos. The song peaked at number 11 on the Billboard Latin Pop Songs and Latin Songs component charts. While less successful than its preceding singles, its performance continued to aid its parent album in becoming her breakthrough record, which eventually attained platinum certifications in Argentina, Brazil, Colombia, and the United States.

A Portuguese-language translation of the track titled "Um Pouco de Amor" appeared on Shakira's first remix album The Remixes in 1997. The song has additionally been performed during two of her concert tours to date.

== Background and composition ==
Shakira released her third studio album Pies Descalzos in 1995 by Sony Music Colombia. It was her first album being released outside of Colombia via Sony Colombia's parent company Columbia Records. Assuming a prominent position in its production, she co-wrote each of the eleven tracks included on the record. Serviced as the fourth single from the project, "Un Poco de Amor" saw additional songwriting from producer Luis Fernando Ochoa. The track is heavily influenced by Latin pop elements, and additionally incorporates reggae styles. Lyrically, it states that Shakira is waiting to find someone who loves her. It became her first track to include phrases in English, performed by the Colombian reggae singer Howard Glasford., also referred to as Howard Glassfor. The Pies Descalzos CD booklet says Rasta vox, guitarra skank: Howard Glassfor (Rasta voice, guitar skank of Jamaican music).

The accompanying music video for "Un Poco de Amor" was directed by Gustavo Garzón. The clip depicts a black-haired and red-haired Shakira dancing with Glasford, in addition to members of various ethnic groups. The music video received a Billboard Latin Music Award for Pop Video of the Year. A Portuguese version of the song, entitled "Um Pouco de Amor", was included in Shakira's 1997 remix album The Remixes.

== Reception ==
Upon its release, "Un Poco de Amor" received generally favorable reviews from music critics, who recognized it as a stand-out track from Pies Descalzos. Carlos Quintana of About.com complimented the track for its reggae influences, and placed it among his personal favorites from the record. Similarly, Jose F. Promis from Allmusic praised it for being a "dancehall-lite" track, going on to select the song as an "Allmusic Pick". The song peaked at number 11 on the Billboard Latin Pop Songs and Latin Songs component charts. While less successful than its preceding singles, its performance continued to aid its parent album in becoming her breakthrough record, which eventually attained platinum certifications in Argentina, Brazil, and the United States. Pies Descalzos was also awarded the "Diamond Prism" award in Colombia.

In 1996, "Un Poco de Amor" was included in the reissue of Pies Descalzos, titled Colección de Oro. In 2002, it was featured as the third track for Shakira's first greatest hits album Grandes Éxitos. Its appearance in both records was complimented as being reminiscent of her rise to prominence.

== Live performances ==
Shakira has performed "Un Poco de Amor" during two of her concert tours thus far. She first performed the track in Mexico City during her Tour Pies Descalzos, which ran from 1996 through 1997. It was also included during the Tour of the Mongoose, held in support of her third studio album Laundry Service. The song was notably absent from her Tour Anfibio, Oral Fixation Tour, The Sun Comes Out World Tour, El Dorado World Tour and Las Mujeres Ya No Lloran World Tour.

== Track listing ==
Mexican Promo CD

1. "Un Poco De Amor"
2. "Un Poco De Amor" (Memes Dancehall Posse Mix)
3. "Un Poco De Amor" (The Extended Dancehall 12)
4. "Un Poco De Amor" (Memes Jazz Experience)
5. "Un Poco De Amor" (Instrumental)

== Charts ==
Chart (1996)	Peak position
Spain Airplay (Music & Media)	7
US Latin Pop Airplay (Billboard)	11
Venezuela (UPI)	4
