= Vilma Palma e Vampiros =

Argentine new wave rock band

- Also known as: Vilma Palma
- Origin: Rosario, Santa Fe, Argentina
- Genres: Pop rock New wave Latin rock Pop; Latin pop Alternative rock Rock en español Indie rock Power pop
- Years active: 1990–present
- Labels: Barca Discos, EMI, Sony Music, Epsa Music Discos Musart (in Mexico), BMV Producciones
- Spinoff of: Identi-Kit, Sangre Púrpura
- Members: Mario "Pájaro" Gómez (vocals); Gerardo "Largo" Pugliani (bass); Carlos "Oveja" González (drums); Karina Di Lorenzo (choruses); Pablo Cejas (guitar); Fabiana Díaz (choruses); Martín Cura (keyboards); Luciano "Lucho" Cristini (percussion)
- Past members: José Luis Roma; Raúl Roma; Jorge Risso; Luis Sánchez; Natalia Moscariello; Gustavo Sachetti; Ricardo "Vila" Vilaseca; Patricia Krebs; Berenice Ruan; Pablo Medina; Pablo Correa; Emiliano Almeida; Marcelo Cáceres; Vilma Calderón; Claudio Garbolino; Julián Baronio; Natalia Benítez; Willy Vargas; Marisa "La Rusa" Mere; Ezequiel Guillardy; Ariel Hueso

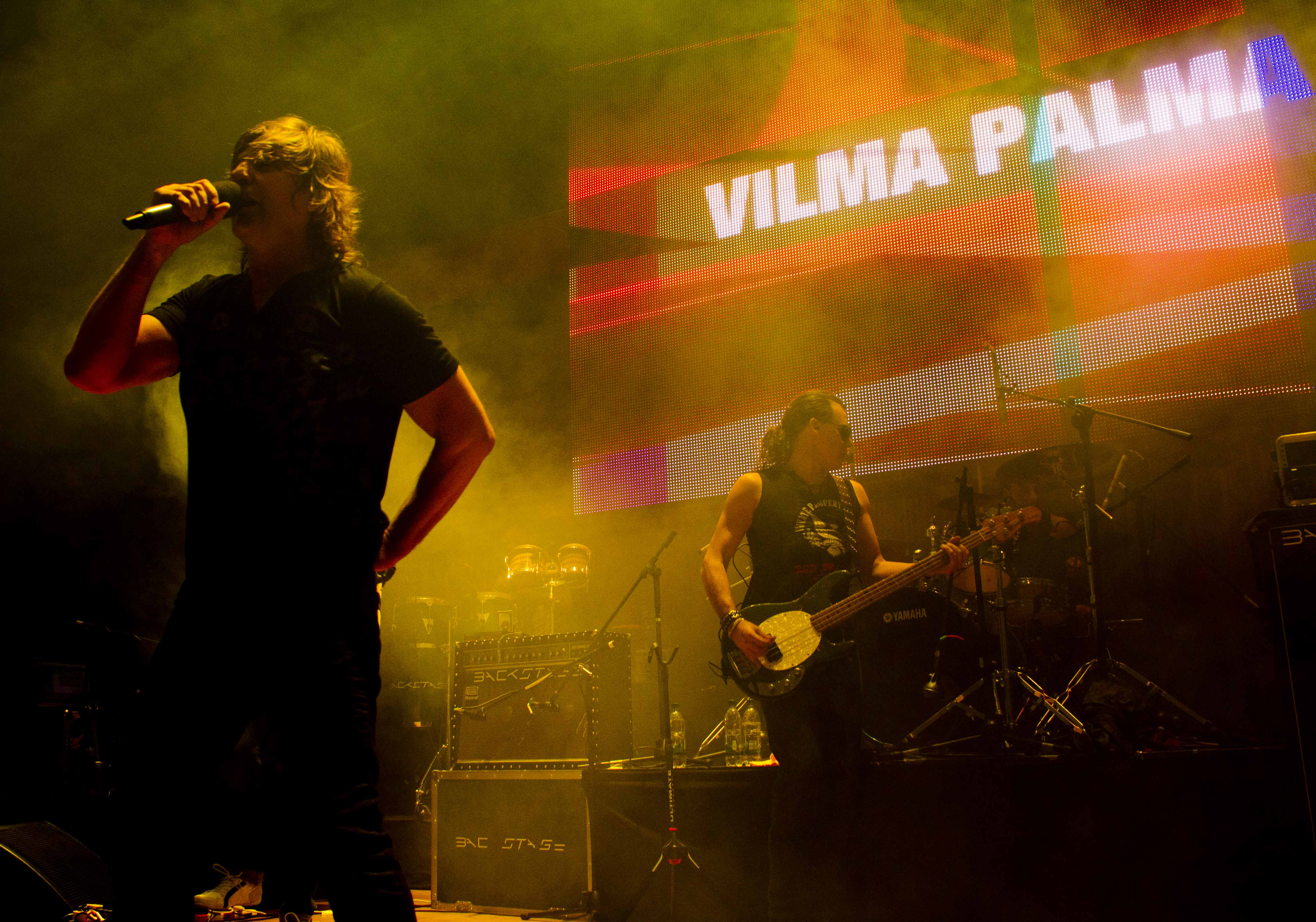
Vilma Palma e Vampiros in 2011

Vilma Palma e Vampiros is an Argentine new wave indie rock en español band from Rosario. They came to prominence in 1992 after the release of the hits "Bye, Bye" and "La Pachanga".

== Origin of the name ==
Translated as Vilma Palma and Vampires, the name was taken from a graffiti written over the metallic shutters of a closed furniture store by its former employees, calling out the manager: "Vilma Palma e Hijos Vampiros de los Obreros" (Vilma Palma and Sons, Vampires of the Workers). With time, the graffiti vanished until the words "Vilma Palma e Vampiros" remained by 1991.

This explanation makes for the grammatical error in the name: e is used instead of y (as and) only when followed by a word starting with i- or hi- (unless i- or hi- are followed by any other vowel).

== Discography ==
- 1992 – La Pachanga
- 1993 – 3980
- 1994 – Fondo Profundo
- 1995 – En vivo (Live album)
- 1996 – Sepia, Blanco y Negro
- 1997 – Ángeles & Demonios
- 1998 – Hecatombe Disco
- 2000 – 7 (siete)
- 2002 – Vuelve A Comenzar
- 2005 – Histeria
- 2008 – Grandes Éxitos En Vivo Buenos Aires (Live album)
- 2010 – 20 10
- 2012 – Agárrate Fuerte
- 2018 – Boomerang
