= Estoy Aquí =

1995 song by Shakira

- Artwork used for the French CD single

Single by Shakira

from the album Pies Descalzos
- B-side: "Te Espero Sentada"
- Released: August 29, 1995
- Recorded: 1995
- Studio: Sonido Azulado Studio (Bogota, Colombia); Ocean V.U. Studio (Miami, FL)
- Genre: Latin, dance
- Length: 3:55
- Label: Sony Music Colombia
- Composer: Luis Fernando Ochoa
- Lyricist: Shakira
- Producer: Luis Fernando Ochoa

Shakira singles chronology
"Tú Serás la Historia de Mi Vida" (1993)	"Estoy Aquí" (1995)	"¿Dónde Estás Corazón?" (1996)

Music video
- "Estoy Aquí" on YouTube

"Estoy Aquí" (English: "I'm Here") is a song by Colombian singer-songwriter Shakira, taken from her third studio album Pies Descalzos (1995). It was released in 1995 by Sony Music Colombia as the lead single from the album. The song was co-written by Shakira and Luis Fernando Ochoa and produced by the latter. "Estoy Aquí" discusses a willingness to correct a failed relationship.

Upon its release, "Estoy Aquí" received generally favorable reviews from music critics, who recognized it as a stand-out track from Pies Descalzos. Additionally, it became Shakira's first recording to attain commercial success outside her native Colombia. The song peaked at numbers 1 and 2 on the Billboard Latin Pop Songs and Latin Songs component charts and reached number 5 in Spain. Its performance aided its parent album in becoming her breakthrough record, which eventually attained Platinum certifications in Brazil, Colombia, and the United States. Its accompanying music video depicts Shakira performing the track, often pictured with her guitar.

A Portuguese-language translation of the track titled "Estou Aqui" appeared on Shakira's first remix album The Remixes in 1997. An English-language version, "I Am Here", was leaked to the internet in 2011. The song has additionally been performed during six of the seven concert tours Shakira has held to date. A remix by Papatinho was published in 2025.

== Background and composition ==
"Estoy Aquí"
A sample of "Estoy Aquí" by Shakira, which incorporates prominent elements of Latin house.

Pies Descalzos was released in 1995 by Sony Music Colombia. It was the first Shakira album to be released outside of her native Colombia. Assuming a prominent position in its production, she co-wrote each of the eleven tracks included on the record. Serviced as the lead single from the project in 1996, "Estoy Aquí" saw additional songwriting from its producer, Luis Fernando Ochoa. The track is heavily influenced by Latin house elements, and makes use of prominent guitar instrumentation. Lyrically, it states a desire to amend a failed relationship. In English, the lyrics "lo que nos pasó no repetirá jamás" and "Estoy aquí queriéndote, ahogándome" translate to "what happened to us will never be repeated" and "I'm here wanting you, drowning", respectively. After attaining success with the original Spanish-language version, "Estoy Aquí" was re-recorded in Portuguese as "Estou Aqui" for Shakira's 1997 remix album The Remixes. An English-language version "I'm Here" was leaked in early-2011, but was not made available for digital download.

== Reception ==
Upon its release, "Estoy Aquí" received generally favorable reviews from music critics, who recognized it as a stand-out track from Pies Descalzos. Carlos Quintana of About.com complimented the track for featuring a "vibrant dancing flavor", and placed it among his personal favorites from the record. Similarly, Jose F. Promis from Allmusic praised it for serving as an "infectious and melodic" opening track, going on to select the song as an album highlight. The song received a nomination for Pop Song of the Year at the 1997 Lo Nuestro Awards, but lost to "Experiencia Religiosa" by Enrique Iglesias.

"Estoy Aquí" became Shakira's first recording to attain commercial success. The song peaked at numbers 1 and 2 on the Billboard Latin Pop Songs and Latin Songs component charts. Its commercial performance aided its parent album in becoming her breakthrough record, which eventually attained Platinum certifications in Brazil, and the United States. Pies Descalzos was also awarded the "Diamond Prism" award in Colombia.

In 1996, "Estoy Aquí" was included in the reissue of Pies Descalzos, titled Colección de Oro. In 2002, it was featured as the opening track for Shakira's first greatest hits album Grandes Éxitos.

== Music video ==
"Estoy Aquí" became the first track by Shakira to receive an accompanying music video, which was directed by Simon Brand. The setting depicts a barn during the various weather seasons, and shows Shakira performing the song, accompanied with a guitar in most scenes. The clip was met with a favorable response from her label Sony Music, and was also met with commercial success. Consequentially, executives decided to place additional emphasis on promoting Pies Descalzos if it were to exceed sales of 50,000 copies. John Lannert from Billboard positively noted that her voice and appearance "jumps out at you". In Colombia, it was recognized as the "Best Video" at the Asociación Colombiana de Periodistas del Espectáculo (ACPE) Awards. After the huge success of the single in Latin America and Spain, Shakira filmed an alternate music video for the song, directed by French photographer and filmmaker Christophe Gstalder, this music video was used to promote the song in European countries and was marketed as "Estoy Aquí (European Mix)". This alternate music video depicts Shakira playing the guitar and dancing, posing seductively behind an aquarium and setting her guitar on fire. This alternate video also has the English version called "I Am Here" but was never released. However, the clip appeared on a French television interview Star Story.

== Live performances ==
Shakira has performed "Estoy Aquí" during six of her seven concert tours thus far. She first performed the track in Mexico City during her Tour Pies Descalzos, which ran from 1996 through 1997. It was also included during the Tour Anfibio and Tour of the Mongoose, held in support of her second and third studio albums Dónde Están los Ladrones? and Laundry Service, respectively. The song was additionally performed during the Oral Fixation Tour, which became her largest tour to date. In place of its inclusion in The Sun Comes Out World Tour, "Estoy Aquí" was performed in Rio de Janeiro as part of Rock in Rio in 2011. Later in 2018 the song served as an opening song for her El Dorado World Tour.

In August 1999, Shakira sang "Estoy Aquí" during an episode of MTV Unplugged in New York City. In February 2000, the performance was included in the live album of the event. At the 12th Latin Grammy Awards ceremony in 2011, Mexican singer-songwriter Aleks Syntek performed a live cover of the song as part of the Latin Grammys tribute to Shakira, where she was honored Latin Recording Academy Person of the Year.

== Papatinho Remix ==
"Estoy Aquí (Remix)"

Promotional single by Shakira and Papatinho
- Released: January 30, 2025
- Recorded: 2024
- Genre: Latin house, Funk carioca
- Length: 2:39
- Label: Sony Latin
- Composers: Shakira; Luis Fernando Ochoa
- Lyricist: Shakira
- Producers: Shakira; Papatinho; Luis Fernando Ochoa

Shakira promotional singles chronology
"Nada" (2018)	"Estoy Aquí (Remix)" (2025)	"Última" (2025)

Music video
- "Estoy Aquí (Remix - Dance Video)" on YouTube

On January 30, 2025 Shakira released a new version of the track featuring Brazilian DJ Papatinho under the title "Estoy Aquí (Remix)" or "Estoy Aquí (MTG Remix)" depending on the streaming platform. The remixed version is much shorter than the original song and it features new vocals and production by the singer. In a statement shared across her social media accounts, Shakira said this was released as a gift to her Brazilian fans explaining that this is "the song that made me fall in love with your country" and that it was an honor to start her Las Mujeres Ya No Lloran World Tour in Rio. The cover of the single utilizes a purple filter and it shows Shakira looking at what appears to be a mirror but instead of looking at her reflection, what is seen is the picture used on the cover of her 1995 album Pies Descalzos.

=== Music video ===
On February 20, 2025 a Dance video was uploaded to Shakira's official YouTube channel. The video was directed and choreographed by Brazilian social media personality Raphael Vicente, who was also one of the main dancers along with his group Dance Maré. The group had already performed the dance number for Shakira on February 9, when Shakira was a guest on the variety tv show Domingão com Huck.

== Track listings ==
French CD Single

1. "Estoy Aquí"
2. "Te Espero Sentada"

Brazilian Promo CD

1. "Estou Aqui"

Colombian 12" Vinyl

1. "Estoy Aquí" (The Love & House Mix)
2. "Estoy Aquí" (The Love & House Radio Edit)
3. "Estoy Aquí" (Extended Club Mix)
4. "Estoy Aquí" (The Radio Edit)
5. "Estoy Aquí" (Meme's Timbalero Dub)
6. "Estoy Aquí" (The Love & Tears Mix)

2025 Digital Single

1. "Estoy Aquí (Remix)" ft. Papatinho

== Cover versions ==
Mexican singer-songwriter Carla Morrison released an acoustic version of the song on February 4, 2022.

== Personnel ==
Credits adapted from the liner notes of Estoy Aquí promotional CD single.

- Shakira – vocals, lyricist
- Luis Fernando Ochoa – composer

== Charts ==
=== Weekly charts ===
Chart (1996)	Peak position
Bolivia (UPI)	3
El Salvador (UPI)	1
Mexico (UPI)	2
Peru (UPI)	1
Spain (AFYVE)	5
US Hot Latin Songs (Billboard)	2
US Latin Pop Airplay (Billboard)	1
Venezuela (UPI)	1

=== Year-end charts ===
Chart (1996)	Peak position
US Hot Latin Songs (Billboard)	32

== Certifications ==
Certifications and sales for "Estoy Aquí"
Region	Certification	Certified units/sales
Brazil (Pro-Música Brasil)	Gold	30,000^{‡}
Colombia	Platinum+Gold	
Mexico (AMPROFON)	Diamond+2× Platinum+Gold	450,000^{‡}
Spain (Promusicae)	Gold	30,000^{‡}
^{‡} Sales+streaming figures based on certification alone.

== See also ==
- List of Billboard Latin Pop Airplay number ones of 1996
