= Antología (song) =

- Artwork used for the CD single in Spain.

Single by Shakira

from the album Pies Descalzos
- Released: January 8, 1997
- Recorded: 1995
- Studio: Sonido Azulado Studio (Bogota, Colombia); Ocean V.U. Studio (Miami, FL)
- Genre: Latin pop
- Length: 4:18
- Label: Sony Music
- Songwriters: Shakira; Luis Fernando Ochoa
- Producer: Luis Fernando Ochoa

Shakira singles chronology
"Un Poco de Amor" (1996)	"Antología" (1997)	"Se Quiere, Se Mata" (1997)

Live video
- Antología on YouTube

"Antología" (English: Anthology) is a song by Colombian singer-songwriter Shakira, taken from her third studio album Pies Descalzos. It was released in 1997 by Sony Music as the fifth single from the album. The song was co-written by Shakira with producer Luis Fernando Ochoa. "Antología" is a Latin pop ballad that lyrically discusses an appreciation for the knowledge a lover has shared. It is one of Shakira's signature songs in Latin America.

== Background ==
In 1990, a 13-year-old Shakira signed a recording contract with Sony Music Colombia and released her debut studio album Magia in 1991, which largely consisted of tracks she had written since she was eight years old. Commercially, the project struggled, selling an underwhelming 1,200 copies in her native Colombia. Her follow-up record Peligro was released in 1993, and suffered a similar failure. Consequently, Shakira took a two-year hiatus, allowing her to complete her high school education.

Looking to revive her struggling career, Shakira released her third studio album Pies Descalzos in 1996 at 18 by Sony Music Colombia in her native country and by Columbia Records internationally. Assuming a prominent position in its production, she co-wrote each of the eleven tracks included on the record. Serviced as the fifth single from the project, "Antología" was produced by the single's co-songwriter, Luis Fernando Ochoa. The track is heavily influenced by Latin pop elements, and makes use of prominent guitar instrumentation. Lyrically, it discusses an appreciation of the knowledge a lover has shared.

== Music video ==
Although there is no official music video to the song, a live concert from December 2006 during the 'Oral Fixation Tour' in Miami was uploaded to Shakira's official YouTube channel in October 2009. As of December 2024, the video has accumulated over 170 million views.

== Charts ==
Chart (1997)	Peak position
US Hot Latin Songs (Billboard)	15
US Latin Pop Airplay (Billboard)	3

Chart (2025)	Peak position
Colombia (Colombia Hot 100)	71
Ecuador (Billboard)	18

== Certifications ==
Region	Certification	Certified units/sales
Mexico (AMPROFON)	4× Diamond+4× Platinum+Gold	1,470,000^{‡}
^{‡} Sales+streaming figures based on certification alone.
