= Pies Descalzos =

Studio album by Shakira
- Released: 6 October 1995
- Recorded: 1994–1995
- Studios: Sonido Azulado (Bogotá); Ocean V.U. (Miami); Fuller Sound (Miami)
- Genres: Rock; Latin rock; pop rock; alternative rock
- Length: 41:06
- Languages: Spanish; English; Portuguese
- Label: Sony Music Entertainment (Colombia)
- Producers: Luis Fernando Ochoa, Shakira Mebarak

Shakira chronology
Peligro (1993)	Pies Descalzos (1995)	The Remixes (1997)

Singles from Pies Descalzos
- 1. "Estoy Aquí" Released: 29 August 1995; 2. "¿Dónde Estás Corazón?" Released: 2 February 1996; 3. "Pies Descalzos, Sueños Blancos" Released: 15 April 1996; 4. "Un Poco de Amor" Released: 16 May 1996; 5. "Antología" Released: 8 January 1997; 6. "Se Quiere, Se Mata" Released: 10 March 1997

Pies Descalzos (transl. Bare Feet, Spanish: [pjes ðesˈkal.sos]) is the third studio album and major international debut by Colombian singer-songwriter Shakira, released on 6 October 1995 by Sony Music Colombia. It is a rock album that incorporates Latin pop styles and pop rock elements. Looking to revive her struggling career after the commercial failures of her first two studio efforts Magia and Peligro, she wrote all of the songs on the record and had a prominent role in the album's production. Luis Fernando Ochoa co-wrote each of the eleven tracks and produced the whole album.

Pies Descalzos received generally favorable reviews from music critics, who complimented it as a strong showing. Commercially, the project became Shakira's breakthrough record, with which she established notability throughout Latin America. It was awarded the "Diamond Prism" in her native Colombia, acknowledging one million copies sold in the nation. The album additionally peaked at numbers three and five on the US Billboard Latin Pop Albums and Latin Albums component charts, respectively. It was later certified platinum by the Recording Industry Association of America (RIAA) and was a breakthrough for Shakira in the country, according to John Lannert of Billboard.

Six singles were released from Pies Descalzos, all of which attained commercial success in the United States. Its lead single "Estoy Aquí" peaked at number 2 on the Billboard Latin Songs component chart, and was her first track promoted through an accompanying music video. Follow-up singles "¿Dónde Estás Corazón?", "Pies Descalzos, Sueños Blancos', "Un Poco de Amor", "Antología", and "Se Quiere, Se Mata" peaked within the top 20 of the chart. The record gave rise to the Tour Pies Descalzos, which visited countries in South and North America and in Europe from October 1995 to October 1997. The album was reissued as Colección de Oro in 2002.

== Background ==
In 1990, a 13-year-old Shakira signed a recording contract with Sony Music Colombia. Her debut studio album Magia was released in 1991; several of the tracks she had written since she was eight years old. Commercially, the project struggled, selling an underwhelming 1,200 copies in her native Colombia. The follow-up record Peligro was released in 1993 and suffered a similar failure. Shakira then tried for an acting career, starring in Colombian telenovela El Oasis. In 1994, she recorded her song "¿Dónde Estás Corazón?". It was included on a Colombian compilation album titled Nuestro Rock Volumen II and became a big hit in the country. Its success motivated Sony Music to commission Shakira to create a complete rock album, Pies Descalzos, which was produced on a budget of only $100,000.

== Composition ==
"Estoy Aquí"
A sample of "Estoy Aquí" by Shakira, which incorporates prominent elements of Latin pop.

Pies Descalzos focuses on Latin rock genres and also pop rock styles. Shakira is the principal author of each of the 11 tracks included on the record and she assumed a prominent role in its production (done primarily by Luis Fernando Ochoa). The album opens with "Estoy Aquí" ('I'm Here'), notable for its rock guitar instrumentation. Lyrically, the song discusses a willingness to correct a failed relationship. The ballad "Antología" ('Anthology') notes an appreciation of the knowledge a lover has shared. "Un Poco de Amor" ('A Little Bit of Love') is about the singer waiting to find someone who loves her. It became her first track to include phrases in English, performed by Howard Glasford. It introduces elements of reggae music.

The other songs are the guitar-driven "Quiero" ('I Want'), the mid-tempo "Te Necesito" ('I Need You'), the upbeat "Vuelve" ('Come Back'), the bossa nova "Te Espero Sentada" ('I Wait Sitting'), "Pies Descalzos, Sueños Blancos" ('Bare Feet, White Dreams') with biblical and other symbolism such as "you were dust, dust you are" or "you bit the apple" in its lyrics, "Pienso en Ti" ('I Think of You'), "¿Dónde Estás Corazón?" ('Where Are You Love?'), and "Se Quiere, Se Mata" ('If You Love, You Kill'), where Shakira poetically expresses her point of view on the abortion controversy.

== Singles ==
"Estoy Aquí" was released as the lead single from Pies Descalzos in August 1995. It was met with positive reviews from music critics, who recognized it as a stand-out track from its parent album. Successful in the US, the song peaked at numbers 1 and 2 on the Billboard Latin Pop Songs and Latin Songs component charts. "Estoy Aquí" was the first track from the album to receive an accompanying music video, directed by Simon Brand. The setting depicts a barn during the fall and wintertime, and shows a black-haired Shakira performing the song with her guitar.

After becoming Shakira's first highly successful song, "¿Dónde Estás Corazón?" was included on Pies Descalzos, re-released as the second single of the project and also embraced as a highlight from the record. The track peaked at numbers 3 and 5 on the Billboard Latin Pop Songs and Latin Songs charts, respectively. Its music video, directed by Gustavo Garzón, shows scenes of Shakira holding photographs, sitting in a red chair or singing in the rain.

"Pies Descalzos, Sueños Blancos" was serviced as the third single from its parent album and was praised for its melody and songwriting. In comparison to the preceding singles, the track slightly underperformed, reaching number 11 on the Billboard Latin Pop Songs chart. Its music video was directed by Garzón and shows Shakira singing at a masquerade ball.

"Un Poco de Amor", the fourth single from the project, was appreciated for its prominent reggae influences. It peaked at number 11 on both the Billboard Latin Songs and Latin Pop Songs charts. The music video, directed by Garzón, depicts Shakira singing and dancing with guest vocalist Howard Glasford, in addition to members of various ethnic groups.

The fifth single "Antología" peaked at numbers 3 and 15 on the Latin Pop Songs and Latin Songs charts, respectively. The track did not receive a music video, but its many live performances can be found on YouTube from 1995 on, including one in Miami during the Oral Fixation Tour, officially released in 2009. As of November 2024, it had amassed over 170 million views.

The sixth and final single "Se Quiere, Se Mata" reached numbers 1 and 8 on the Latin Pop Songs and Latin Songs charts, respectively. Its music video was directed by Juan Carlos Martin. It tells the story of Braulio and Dana, who succumb to their sexual desires, resulting in Dana's pregnancy. Dana goes to abort her unborn child and dies herself.

== Tour ==
Shakira promoted the album with the Tour Pies Descalzos that lasted for two years, from October 1995 to October 1997. On 6 October 1995, the date of the album's release, she held the first live Concierto de Lanzamiento performance with material from the record at La Castellana theater in Bogotá. During the tour, she visited most Latin American countries, the U.S. and Spain. In 1996, the concert in Ecuador and the show in Mexico City that attracted over 10,000 fans were filmed and broadcast on national televisions. By the tour's conclusion, Shakira had performed about 100 shows across three continents and was a well-established and admired artist throughout Latin America.

== Critical reception ==
Professional ratings
Review scores
Source	Rating
About.com	5/5 stars
AllMusic	4/5 stars
The New Rolling Stone Album Guide	2.5/5 stars

Pies Descalzos received generally favorable reviews from music critics, who complimented it as a strong debut showing. Carlos Quintana from About.com appreciated Shakira's "combination of styles, well thought lyrics and music arrangements". Jose F. Promis of AllMusic opined that the record balanced "heartfelt, earnest ballads with catchy, jangly pop/rock" and was a "solid debut". Billboard gave a positive review, according to which the record carries "passion, conviction, and honesty".

At the 1997 Billboard Latin Music Awards, the album received two awards: for Pop Album of the Year by a Female Artist and Pop Album of the Year by a New Artist. "Un Poco de Amor" won for Pop Video of the Year. Pies Descalzos was also nominated at the 9th Lo Nuestro Awards in 1997 for Pop Album of the Year, but lost to Enrique Iglesias's album Vivir. Shakira herself received the Lo Nuestro Awards for Pop Female Artist of the Year and Pop New Artist of the Year. "Estoy Aquí" and "Pies Descalzos, Sueños Blancos" received nominations in the categories of Pop Song of the Year and Video of the Year, respectively.

In 2015, Billboard listed Pies Descalzos as one of the Essential Latin Albums of Past 50 Years, concluding that "finally, Latin rock had found its muse".

== Commercial performance ==
Pies Descalzos became Shakira's breakthrough record, with which she established notability throughout Latin America. In Argentina, it attained double-platinum certification after passing 120,000 in sold copies. In her native Colombia, the album was awarded the "Diamond Prism" by her record label, acknowledging sales of one million units. It was awarded platinum in Ecuador, Venezuela, Peru, Chile, Mexico, and Central America. In Latin America, the album sold over 2 million copies by May 1997. As of 2008, Pies Descalzos had sold over five million copies worldwide.

The album peaked at number 71 on the German Albums Chart. In the United States, it failed to chart on the Billboard 200. However, it reached number 34 on the Billboard Hot Heatseekers Albums component chart and peaked at numbers 3 and 5 on the Latin Pop Albums and Latin Albums charts. As of October 2017, 580,000 copies were sold in the US, making it the 23rd bestselling Latin album in the country according to Nielsen SoundScan.

== Legacy ==
In the book "Shakira: Woman of Grace", Ximena Diego wrote that Pies Descalzos allowed Shakira to reinvent herself in her career, since after the commercial failure of her albums Magia (1991) and Peligro (1993), she thought about retiring from music. In an interview with El Tiempo magazine, Alberto Vásquez, manager of Sony Music Colombia's Promotion Department, stated that the album's sales exceeded expectations and allowed the singer to conquer new territories where no other Colombian artist had previously reached. According to the Colombian magazine Semana, with the new album Shakira became an "international phenomenon". El Tiempo noted that in 1996 Shakira achieved the status of teenage idol among the youth of Latin America. The magazine El Comercio stated that the album "paved the way for Latin artists in international pop". The magazine El Universo considered the album a point of reference in Spanish-language music. Hector Gaona of Teleantioquia talked about how the album "changed Colombian pop", with songs like "Antología" and "Estoy Aquí" defining a new aesthetic in Latin music. He observed that Shakira was "the voice that spoke for a generation". The newspaper Las Americas wrote that Pies Descalzos "is the flagship album of a generation, which marked a before and after in the history of Latin American pop". Señal Colombia described the album's impact as changing the history of Latin pop.

== Track listing ==
All tracks are written by Shakira and Luis Fernando Ochoa.

Pies Descalzos
No.	Title	Length
1.	"Estoy Aquí"	3:52
2.	"Antología"	4:15
3.	"Un Poco de Amor"	4:00
4.	"Quiero"	4:10
5.	"Te Necesito"	4:00
6.	"Vuelve"	3:54
7.	"Te Espero Sentada"	3:29
8.	"Pies Descalzos, Sueños Blancos"	3:28
9.	"Pienso en Ti"	2:27
10.	"¿Dónde Estás Corazón?"	3:52
11.	"Se Quiere, Se Mata"	3:39

Japanese version bonus tracks
No.	Title	Length
12.	"Estoy aquí" (The Love & House Mix)	8:31
13.	"Estoy aquí" (Radio edit)	4:40

Brazilian version bonus tracks
No.	Title	Length
12.	"Estou Aqui" (Portuguese version)	3:51
13.	"Um Pouco de Amor" (Portuguese version)	4:00
14.	"Pés Descalços" (Portuguese version)	3:25
15.	"Estoy Aquí" (Radio edit)	4:40
16.	"¿Dónde Estás Corazón?" (Remix)	3:51

== Personnel ==
Credits adapted from the album brochure and Allmusic.

- Shakira Mebarak – principal artist, songwriter, vocals, co-producer
- Luis Fernando Ochoa – songwriter, music and artistic producer, background vocals, guitars, keyboards, harmonica, percussion, programming, mixing, engineer
- Howard Glassfor – vocals, guitar
- Alvaro Farfán – executive director
- Victor Di Persia – recording and mixing engineer
- Camilo Montilla – engineer, piano
- Sonido Azulado – engineer
- Henry Gerhart – live audio engineer
- Luly Deya – assistant engineer
- José Martínez – assistant engineer
- Freddi Niño – assistant engineer
- Juan Antonio Castillo – mixing
- Michael Fuller – mastering
- Sergio Solano – guitar
- Italo Lamboglia – drums
- Gonzalo Vásquez – programming, drums, percussion, background vocals, engineer
- José Gaviria – background vocals
- Andrea Piñeros – background vocals
- Nacho Pilonieta - bass guitar
- José García – bass guitar
- Alejandro Gómez – harmonica
- Eusebio Valderrama – trumpet
- Samuel Torres – percussion
- Edwin Garzón D. – electronic pre-printing
- Felipe Dothé – graphic design
- Javier Hincapié – graphic design
- Patricia Bonilla – photography, cover
- Miguel Angel Velandia – photography

== Charts ==
=== Weekly charts ===
Chart (1996)	Peak position
US Heatseekers Albums (Billboard)	34
US Top Latin Albums (Billboard)	5
US Latin Pop Albums (Billboard)	3

Chart (2002)	Peak position
German Albums (Offizielle Top 100)	71

=== Year-end charts ===
Chart (1996)	Peak position
US Top Latin Albums (Billboard)	12
US Latin Pop Albums (Billboard)	9

Chart (1997)	Peak position
Brazil (Nopem)	22

== Certifications and sales ==
Region	Certification	Certified units/sales
Argentina (CAPIF)	2× Platinum	300,000
Brazil (Pro-Música Brasil)	Platinum	800,000 (Note: The album was certified only as Platinum in Brazil. However, various sources disagree on the number of CD sales in the country. Some values include 500,000, 750,000, 800,000, 1,200,000, and 1,500,000.)
Chile	14× Platinum	50,000
Colombia Physical sales	7× Diamond	1,000,000
Colombia Digital streams	2× Gold	
Ecuador	Platinum	15,000
Mexico (AMPROFON)	Diamond	1,000,000^{‡}
Peru	Platinum	10,000
Puerto Rico	—	15,000
Spain (Promusicae)	Gold	50,000^{^}
United States (RIAA)	Platinum	580,000
Venezuela	Platinum	69.846
Summaries
Central America (CFC)	Platinum	
Worldwide	—	4,000,000
^{^} Shipments figures based on certification alone.^{‡} Sales+streaming figures based on certification alone.

== See also ==
- 1995 in Latin music
- List of best-selling albums in Brazil
- List of best-selling albums in Colombia
- List of best-selling albums in Mexico
- List of best-selling Latin albums
- List of best-selling Latin albums in the United States
