= Se Quiere, Se Mata =

- Artwork used for the Mexican promotional CD single

Single by Shakira

from the album Pies Descalzos
- Released: March 10, 1997
- Recorded: 1995
- Studio: Sonido Azulado Studio (Bogota, Colombia); Ocean V.U. Studio (Miami, FL)
- Genre: Latin pop; pop rock
- Length: 3:39
- Label: Sony Music; Columbia
- Songwriters: Shakira; Luis F. Ochoa
- Producer: Luis F. Ochoa

Shakira singles chronology
"Antología" (1997)	"Se Quiere, Se Mata" (1997)	"Ciega, Sordomuda" (1998)

Music video
- "Se Quiere, Se Mata" on YouTube

"Se Quiere, Se Mata" (English: "It Is Loved, It Is Killed") (Note: The title is derived from the lyric "Porque lo que no se quiere, se mata", meaning "Because what is not loved, is killed".) is the sixth single released from Shakira's third studio album, Pies Descalzos (1995). Written and composed by herself, "Se Quiere, Se Mata" was a top ten hit in Mexico and on the Billboard Hot Latin Tracks in the United States. The song laments the story of a young couple, Braulio and Dana, and their choice to have an abortion. Introduced as an innocent young couple well liked by their families, the two succumb to their sexual desires, and Dana becomes pregnant. However, rather than admit this to their families and neighbors, they choose to get an abortion. The abortion ultimately goes badly, resulting in Dana's death.

== Background and composition ==
In 1990, a thirteen-year-old Shakira signed a recording contract with Sony Music and released her debut studio album Magia in 1991, which largely consisted of tracks she had written since she was eight years old. Commercially, the project struggled, as did her follow-up record Peligro (1993). Consequently, Shakira took a two-year hiatus, allowing her to complete her high school education. Looking to revive her struggling career, Shakira released her third studio album Pies Descalzos in 1996 by Sony Music Colombia in her home country and by Columbia Records internationally. Assuming a prominent position in its production, she co-wrote each of the eleven tracks included on the record.

== Music video ==
The music video was directed by Juan Carlos Martín, and reached number one on the Telehit Top 25. Current leader of the Mexican band Zoé León Larregui appears in this video, as Braulio. The video shows Shakira telling the story of Braulio and Dana; as the song goes on, there are shots of her in a short room, with a black dress, and others where she wears a red dress, in a green room covered with papers, most probably referencing the social rules. In the video, it shows in a censored way, how Braulio and Dana succumb to their sexual desires, and also a short scene of "The Doctor" who Dana goes to abort her unborn baby while Braulio is shown waiting alone in a small restroom, trying to cope with his feelings.

== Charts ==
Chart (1997)	Peak position
US Hot Latin Songs (Billboard)	8
US Latin Pop Airplay (Billboard)	1

== See also ==
- List of Billboard Latin Pop Airplay number ones of 1997
