= ¿Dónde Estás Corazón? =

- Artwork used for the 1996 promotional CD single

Single by Shakira

from the album Nuestro Rock Volumen II and the album Pies Descalzos
- Language: Spanish
- Released: 1994 (original release); 2 February 1996 (re-release)
- Recorded: 1994
- Studio: Sonido Azulado
- Genre: Pop rock; Latin pop
- Length: 3:56
- Label: Sony Colombia
- Composers: Shakira; Luis Fernando Ochoa
- Lyricist: Shakira
- Producer: Luis Fernando Ochoa

Shakira singles chronology
"Estoy Aquí" (1995)	"¿Dónde Estás Corazón?" (1994)	"Pies Descalzos, Sueños Blancos" (1996)

Music video
- "¿Dónde Estás Corazón?" on YouTube

"¿Dónde Estás Corazón?" (English: "Where Are You, My Love?") is a song by Colombian singer-songwriter Shakira, included on the various artists compilation album Nuestro Rock Volumen II (1994). It was later included on her third studio album Pies Descalzos (1995) and re-released as the second single of the project on 2 February 1996.

== Background and writing ==
In 1990, a thirteen-year-old Shakira signed a recording contract with Sony Music Colombia and released her debut studio album Magia in 1991, which largely consisted of tracks she had written since she was eight years old. Commercially, the project struggled, selling an underwhelming 1,200 copies in her native Colombia. Her follow-up record Peligro was released in 1993, and suffered a similar failure. Consequently, Shakira took a two-year hiatus, allowing her to complete her high school education.

Shakira wrote the lyrics to "¿Dónde Estás, Corazón?", re-claiming creative control over her music after not being taken seriously as a songwriter by her label in her two first albums.

== Release ==
The song was originally included on the compilation album Nuestro Rock Volumen II (English: Our Rock Volume II), released in 1994 in her homeland Colombia. The various artists compilation album was a joint project between Colombian radio station Radioactiva and Sony Music Colombia. The song turned out to be the only hit of the whole album, becoming one of the most requested songs on Colombian radio and topping the Radioactiva Top 40 chart. A music video was shot to further promote the project, which was directed by Oscar Azula and Julian Torres. This meant her breakthrough in Colombia. Due to the success of the song, Sony Music Colombia decided to partner Shakira with Luis Fernando Ochoa one more time to co-write a whole body of work. The song was included on Shakira's album Pies Descalzos, and served as the second single when it was re-released in 1996 throughout Latin America. A new music video was shot and released. The song was remixed on The Remixes (1997) and was featured on Shakira's greatest hits CD Grandes Éxitos (2002).

== Reception and commercial performance ==
Shakira and Luis Fernando Ochoa, her co-writer, earned the American Society of Composers, Authors and Publishers award for Pop/Contemporary Song in 1997 for "¿Dónde Estás Corazón?". In 2016, Revista Central listed the song as one of Shakira's seven best singles.

The 1994 physical single release sold over 15,000 copies in Colombia.

== Music videos ==
The original music video was directed by Oscar Azula and Julian Torres. This video shows Shakira performing the song in black and white, and later shows her in color dancing with a silver dress. This video was premiered in Colombia only and stopped being distributed after the second music video was released.

A second music video, directed by Gustavo Garzón, shows various scenes of Shakira holding photos, sitting in a red chair, singing in the rain, and shows other people in different scenes. This video was released in Latin America as part of the promotion of Pies Descalzos.

== Personnel ==
Credits adapted from the liner notes of Nuestro Rock Volumen II.

- Shakira – lead vocals, songwriter, backing vocals
- Luis Fernando Ochoa – songwriter, acoustic guitar, electric guitar, harmonica, bass, keyboard, programming
- Camilo Montilla – piano
- José Gaviria – backing vocals
- Andrea Piñeros – backing vocals
- J. Antonio Castillo – mixing

== Charts ==
Chart (1996)	Peak position
El Salvador (UPI)	6
US Hot Latin Songs (Billboard)	5
US Latin Pop Airplay (Billboard)	3

== Certifications ==
Region	Certification	Certified units/sales
Mexico (AMPROFON)	4× Platinum+Gold	270,000^{‡}
^{‡} Sales+streaming figures based on certification alone.
