= Luis Fernando Ochoa =

- Also known as: LuisFer; LFO
- Born: Luis Fernando Ochoa; August 16, 1968 (age 58)
- Origin: New Orleans, Louisiana, United States
- Genres: Rock; pop; pop rock; Latin pop; dance; merengue
- Occupations: Songwriter; composer; record producer; art producer; sound engineer; arranger; backing vocalist
- Instruments: bass guitar; guitar; harmonica; keyboard; percussion
- Years active: 1984–present
- Labels: Sony BMG; Columbia; Epic; Live Nation; Roc Nation; RCA

Luis Fernando Ochoa (born August 16, 1968) is an American songwriter, musician, record producer, art producer, sound engineer, arranger and backing vocalist known for his works with artists such as Shakira, Chayanne, and Ricky Martin.

== Biography ==
Luis Fernando Ochoa was born in New Orleans, Louisiana, United States on August 16, 1968. He lived in Chicago and at age 17 arrived in Medellin. From an early age, he became used to spending hours stuck to the sound system in which his parents heard songs from Elvis Presley, Engelbert Humperdinck and American folk. Although not from a musical family, his great-grandmother did play the piano very well and it was through that instrument that he began to discover the first notes.

== Career ==
In the 70s he became a fan of rock and bands such as the Rolling Stones, Pink Floyd, and in Medellín he was part of the group Nash. Later in Bogotá he joined Compañía Ilimitada, with which he was linked until 1990. Back in Medellín, he was part of Dloop and Lakesis, he started making music for advertising. His career as a producer started when a BMG label executive asked him what he was doing at Lakesis and, without knowing why, he replied: "I am the producer". Since then he started working as a producer, not only with Shakira but also with other artists like Jose Gaviria. In 1995 he produced and co wrote Pies Descalzos for Sony. Between 1996 and 1998 lived in Mexico City and Los Angeles, and since 1998, when he worked with Shakira on the production of Dónde Están los Ladrones? he established himself in Miami. "It has not been easy, in Miami it is difficult to break the mold of latin rhythms". For him, artists such as Bacilos, Polo Montañés, Juanes and Shakira have been very important because they have exposed music made in Miami to the world and have shown that in variety lies pleasure of learning, making and listening to music. Ochoa received a nomination for Producer of the Year at the 4th Annual Latin Grammy Awards.

== Discography ==
- 1990: Nash – Nash
- 1993: Compañía – Mascaras
- 1995: Aura Christina – Calor
- 1995: Jose Gaviria – Camaleón
- 1996: Shakira – Pies Descalzos
- 1996: Shakira – The Remixes
- 1996: Terry Christian – Broken Hearts
- 1996: Jose Gaviria – Mundo Nuevo
- 1997: Federico Vega – Cápsulas de Amor
- 1998: Shakira – Dónde Están los Ladrones?
- 1999: Juan David – Juan David
- 1999: El Círculo – Murió El Silencio
- 2000: Niurka – Quiero Vivir
- 2000: Shakira – MTV Unplugged
- 2001: Shakira – Laundry Service
- 2002: Anasol – Astros
- 2002: Bacilos – Caraluna
- 2003: Julio Iglesias Jr. Tercera Dimensión
- 2003: Ricky Martin – Almas del Silencio
- 2005: Shakira – Fijación Oral Vol. 1
- 2005: Shakira – Oral Fixation Vol. 2
- 2010: Shakira – Sale el Sol
- 2014: Shakira – Shakira
- 2017: Shakira – El Dorado
- 2024: Shakira – Las Mujeres Ya No Lloran
