= Gustavo Garzón =

Argentine actor

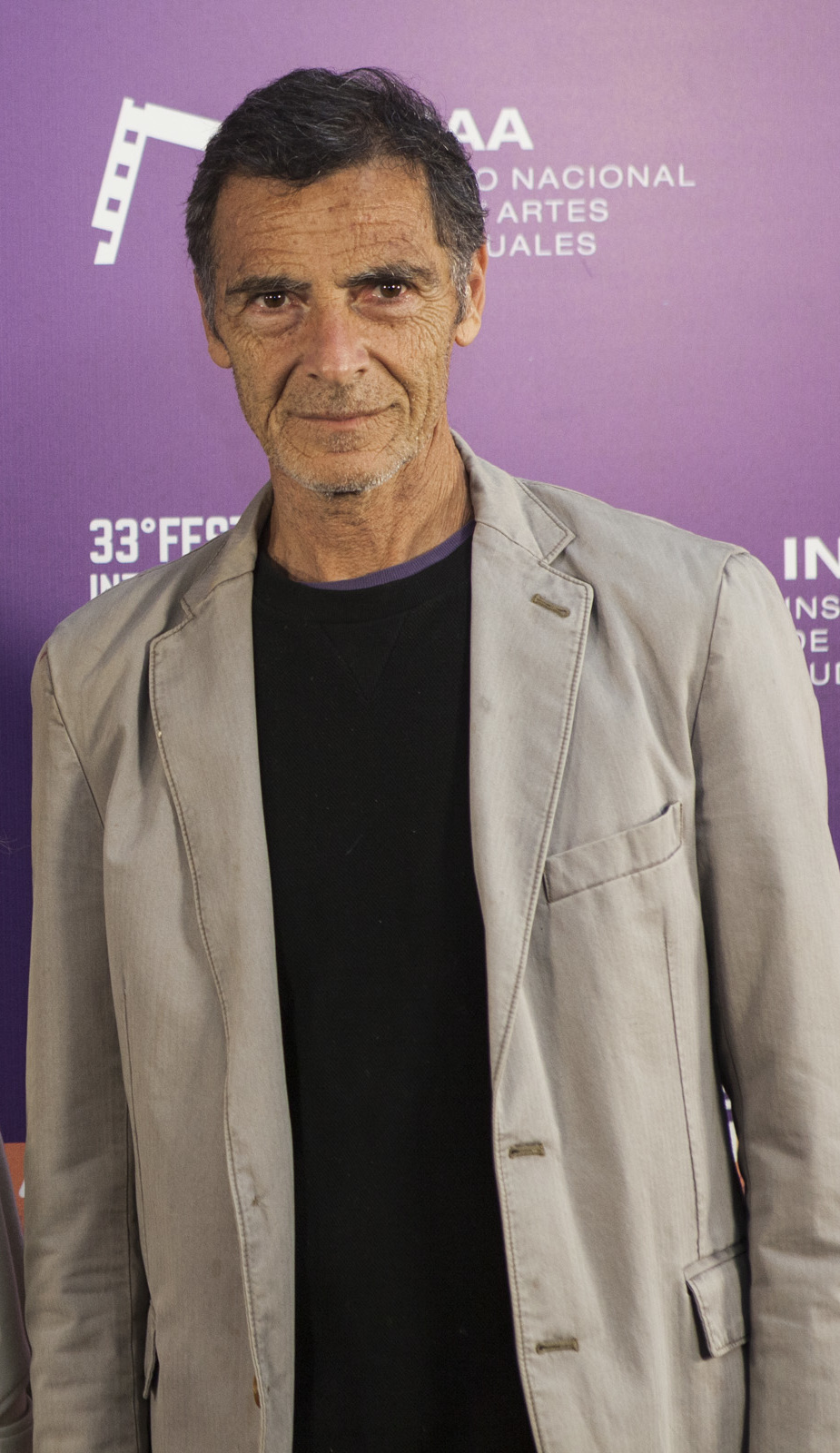
Gustavo Garzón

Gustavo Garzón (born May 25, 1955, in Buenos Aires) is an Argentine film and television actor.

He works in the cinema of Argentina.

== Filmography ==
- Cosa de locos (1981)
- Tacos altos (1985)
- Los Días de junio (1985) a.k.a. Days in June
- Sostenido en La menor (1986) a.k.a. Padre, marido y amante
- Los Amores de Laurita (1986)
- La Clínica del Dr. Cureta (1987)
- La Ciudad oculta (1989)
- Despabílate amor (1996) a.k.a. Wake Up Love
- El Mundo contra mí (1997)
- Qué absurdo es haber crecido (2000) a.k.a. How Silly We Are to Grow Up
- Gallito Ciego (2001)
- El Fondo del Mar (2003) a.k.a. The Bottom of the Sea
- Roma (2004)
- El Buen destino (2005)
- Amor en defensa propia (2006)
- Florianópolis Dream (2018)

== Television ==
- "Aprender a vivir" (1982)
- "Amada" (1983)
- "Por siempre tuyo" (1985)
- "Rossé" (1985)
- "Cuñada, La" (1987)
- "Ella contra mí" (1988)
- "Sin marido" (1988)
- "Así son los míos" (1989)
- "Extraña dama, La" (1989) a.k.a. "The Strange Lady"
- "Amándote II" (1990)
- "El Evangelio según Marcos" (1991) a.k.a. "The Gospel According to Mark"
- "Chiquilina mía" (1991)
- "Soy Gina" (1992)
- "Machos, Los" (1994)
- "Alta comedia" (1996)
- "Señoras y señores" (1997)
- "Casa natal" (1998)
- "Vulnerables" (1999)
- "Tiempofinal" (2000) a.k.a. "Final Minute"
- "Primicias" (2000)
- "Cuatro amigas" (2001) a.k.a. "Four Friends"
- "Franco Buenaventura, el profe" (2002) a.k.a. "Tango Lover"
- "Tres padres solteros" (2003)
- "Mystiko" (2004)
- "Familia especial, Una" (2005)
- "Vientos de agua" (2006)
