= Shakira discography =

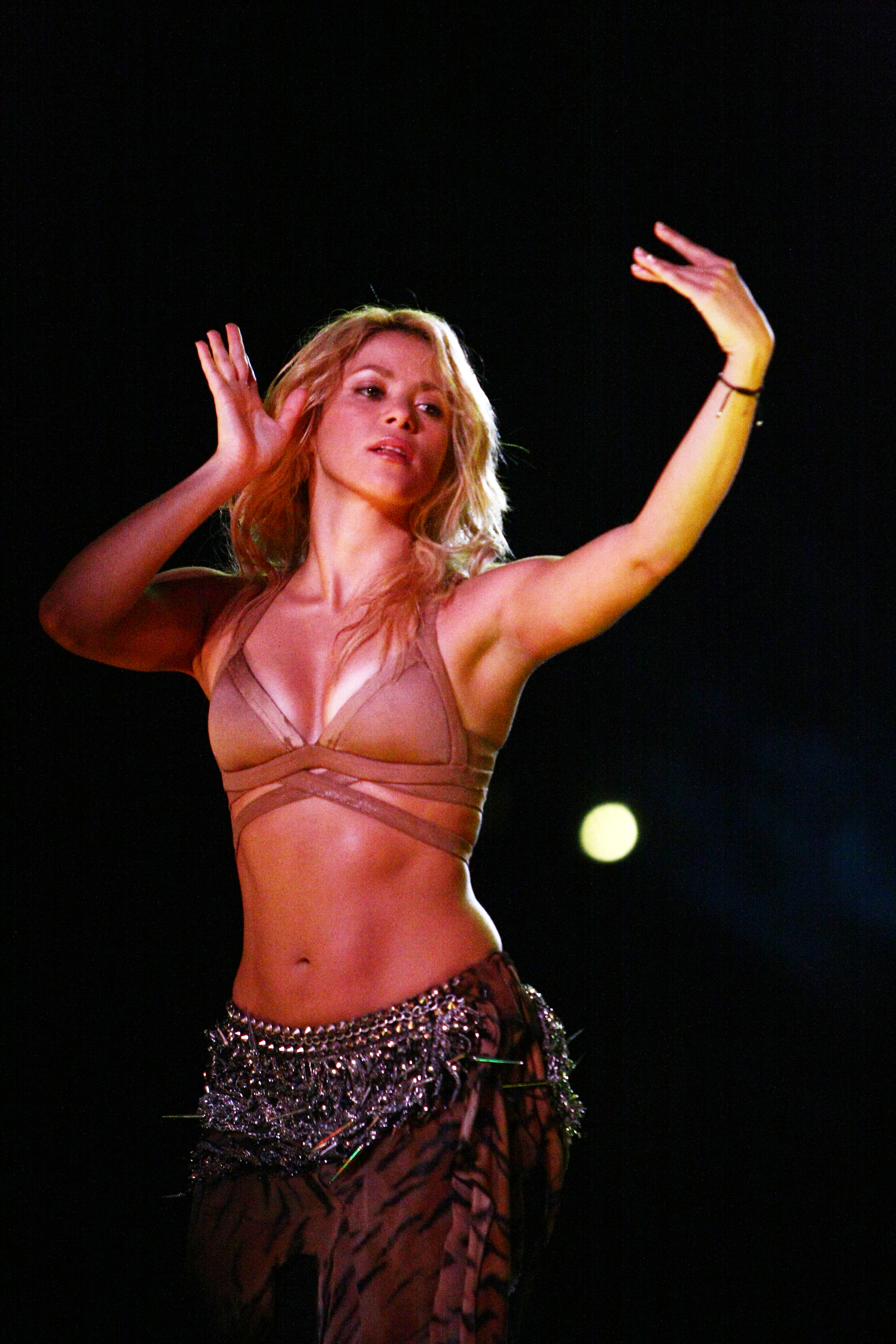
- Shakira performing during The Sun Comes Out World Tour in Singapore in 2011
- Studio albums: 12
- Live albums: 5
- Compilation albums: 4
- Singles: 76
- Music videos: 62
- Reissues: 1
- Promotional singles: 13

Colombian singer-songwriter Shakira has released 12 studio albums, one reissue, five live albums, four compilation albums, 76 singles (including 7 as a featured artist), 13 promotional singles, and 62 music videos (see Shakira videography). With 125 million certified records worldwide, she is the highest-selling Colombian artist and the best-selling female Latin artist of all time. She is the only South American artist to peak at number one on the Australian Singles Chart, the UK Singles Chart, and the US Billboard Hot 100. Her singles "Hips Don't Lie" and "Waka Waka (This Time for Africa)", have achieved sales in excess of ten million units, becoming some of the best-selling singles worldwide.

Shakira's musical career started at the age of 13 when she signed with Sony Music. Her first two studio albums, Magia and Peligro, were released in Colombia in 1991 and 1993, respectively. They performed poorly and had low sales, with the former selling fewer than 1000 copies. Fueled by the success of its lead single "Estoy Aquí", her next album Pies Descalzos (1995) became a success all across Latin America, receiving a diamond certification in Colombia. Her success in Latin America was consolidated by Dónde Están los Ladrones? (1998), which peaked atop the US Billboard Top Latin Albums chart. Like Pies Descalzos, it spawned numerous singles, including the popular "Ciega, Sordomuda". The album also spawned the top-ten hit "Ojos Así", which performed successfully in several European and Latin American countries. Dónde Están los Ladrones? is the ninth best-selling Latin album in the United States.

Motivated by Gloria Estefan, Shakira successfully crossed over into the English-language pop music scene with the release of the multi-platinum selling Laundry Service (2001) and its worldwide chart-toppers "Whenever, Wherever" and "Underneath Your Clothes". The album sold three million copies in six months of its release in the United States. By 2002, Laundry Service had sold more than four million copies across Europe and was declared the seventh best-selling album in the world in the same year by the International Federation of the Phonographic Industry (IFPI). Out of a total of 60 songs, Shakira selected 20 songs and divided them into two albums, the Spanish Fijación Oral, Vol. 1 and the English Oral Fixation, Vol. 2; both were released in 2005. The former opened at number four on the US Billboard 200 with first-week sales of 157,000 units—the highest debut of a full-length Spanish-language album in the country. It finished as the second best-selling Latin album of the decade and is the eighth best-selling Latin album in the United States. Its lead single "La Tortura" spent 25 non-consecutive weeks at number one on the US Billboard Hot Latin Songs chart. "La Tortura" held the record for longest-running number one single on the chart by nearly a decade, until it was succeeded by Enrique Iglesias's song "Bailando" in October 2014. Oral Fixation, Vol. 2 debuted within the top ten in most countries, although its sales began to decline in early 2006. Shakira's label Epic then reissued the album, adding its second single "Hips Don't Lie" to the track list; the song topped charts in 55 countries, including the UK Singles chart and the US Billboard Hot 100. One of the best-selling singles of the 21st century, "Hips Don't Lie" successfully revitalised sales of its parent album. Fijación Oral, Vol. 1 and Oral Fixation, Vol. 2 sold combined copies of over 12 million worldwide.

Shakira's eighth studio album, She Wolf (2009), deviated from her signature Latin pop and pop rock styles, instead exploring the electropop genre. It performed well in Europe and Latin America; in Mexico it was certified platinum and gold within a week of its release. However, it did not replicate its success in the United States, where it peaked at number 15 on the Billboard 200. Shakira was chosen to record the official song of the 2010 FIFA World Cup, "Waka Waka (This Time for Africa)", which was released in May 2010. It topped numerous record charts and was a multi-platinum selling single in Italy, Germany, Mexico, Spain and Switzerland. It was similarly successful in the United States, where it sold more than one million copies and was certified platinum. In the same year, her ninth studio album Sale el Sol was released. Preceded by the top ten hit "Loca", the bilingual album marked a musical return to Shakira's "roots" and retained her success in Europe and Latin America, being certified diamond in both Colombia and France. Inspired by her relationship with Spanish footballer Gerard Piqué and the birth of their son Milan Piqué Mebarak, her tenth studio album Shakira was released in 2014. It became her second consecutive diamond album in Colombia and debuted at number two on the US Billboard 200—her highest peak in the country for an album. It featured the top-ten hits "Can't Remember to Forget You" and "Dare (La La La)". Her eleventh studio album, El Dorado, was released in May 2017 and became her sixth album to reach number one on the US Billboard Top Latin Albums chart. Its lead single "Chantaje" featuring Maluma became an international success and received a 16-times platinum Latin certification from the RIAA.

Her twelfth studio album, Las Mujeres Ya No Lloran, was released in 2024 and contains the worldwide chart-toppers "Shakira: Bzrp Music Sessions, Vol. 53" and "TQG", both of which also debuted within the top ten of the Billboard Hot 100. It became her seventh album to reach number one on the US Billboard Top Latin Albums chart and received a 7-times platinum Latin certification from the RIAA. Its lead single "Te Felicito" with Rauw Alejandro also became an international success and received a 24-times platinum Latin certification from the RIAA.

== Albums ==
=== Studio albums ===
List of studio albums, with selected details, chart positions, sales, and certifications
Title	Studio album details	Peak chart positions										Sales (Note: Pure sales figures without equivalent units (streaming and song downloads))	Certifications
Title	Studio album details	ARG	FRA	GER	ITA	MEX	SPA	SWI	UK	US	US Latin	Sales	Certifications
Magia	Released: 24 June 1991; Label: Sony Colombia; Format: LP	—	—	—	—	—	—	—	—	—	—		
Peligro	Released: 25 March 1993; Label: Sony Colombia; Format: LP	—	—	—	—	—	—	—	—	—	—		
Pies Descalzos	Released: 6 October 1995; Label: Sony Colombia; Formats: CD, LP, cassette, digital download	—	—	71	—	—	—	—	—	—	5	MEX: 950,000 (Note: Sales of Pies Descalzos in Mexico as of 10 March 1996.); US: 580,000 (Note: Sales of Pies Descalzos, Dónde Están los Ladrones? and Fijación Oral, Vol. 1 in the United States as of 17 October 2017.); WW: 5,500,000 (Note: Worldwide sales of Pies Descalzos as of 23 March 2000)	AMPROFON: Diamond; CAPIF: 2× Platinum; PROMUSICAE: Gold; RIAA: Platinum
Dónde Están los Ladrones?	Released: 29 September 1998; Label: Sony Colombia; Formats: CD, LP, cassette, digital download	1	—	79	—	—	22	73	—	131	1	ARG: 365,000 (Note: Sales of Dónde Están los Ladrones in Argentina as of 29 April 2000.); US: 920,000; WW: 4,000,000 (Note: Worldwide sales of Dónde Están los Ladrones as of 28 September 2018.)	AMPROFON: Diamond+Platinum+2× Gold; CAPIF: 4× Platinum; PROMUSICAE: Platinum; RIAA: Platinum
Laundry Service (Note: Laundry Service was also released as Servicio de Lavandería in Latin America and Spain.)	Released: 13 November 2001; Label: Epic; Formats: CD, LP, cassette, digital download	3	5	2	2	—	2	1	2	3	—	MEX: 494,000 (Note: Sales of Servicio de Lavandería in Mexico as of 11 November 2021.); UK: 888,645 (Note: Sales of Laundry Service and Shakira in the United Kingdom as of 24 May 2017.); US: 3,700,000 (Note: Sales of Laundry Service in the United States as of 16 September 2009.); WW: 13,000,000 (Note: Worldwide sales of Laundry Service as of 13 January 2021.)	AMPROFON: Diamond+Gold; BPI: 3× Platinum; BVMI: 5× Gold; CAPIF: 2× Platinum; IFPI SWI: 5× Platinum; PROMUSICAE: 5× Platinum; RIAA: 4× Platinum; SNEP: 2× Platinum
Fijación Oral, Vol. 1	Released: 3 June 2005; Label: Epic; Formats: CD, LP, cassette, digital download	1	6	1	18	1	1	2	—	4	1	US: 1,019,000; WW: 5,000,000 (Note: Worldwide sales of Fijación Oral, Vol. 1 as of 2 February 2009.)	AMPROFON: Diamond+2× Platinum; BVMI: 3× Gold; CAPIF: 3× Platinum; IFPI SWI: Platinum; PROMUSICAE: 3× Platinum; RIAA: Platinum; RIAA: 11× Platinum (Diamond) (Latin); SNEP: Gold
Oral Fixation, Vol. 2	Released: 28 November 2005; Label: Epic; Formats: CD, LP, cassette, digital download	4	8	4	6	4	3	3	12	5	—	ITA: 130,000 (Note: Sales of Oral Fixation, Vol. 2 in Italy as of 2006.); US: 1,745,000 (Note: Sales of Oral Fixation, Vol. 2 in the United States as of 3 July 2014.)	AMPROFON: 2× Platinum+Gold; BPI: Platinum; BVMI: 2× Platinum; CAPIF: Platinum; IFPI SWI: Platinum; PROMUSICAE: Platinum; RIAA: 3× Platinum; SNEP: Platinum
She Wolf (Note: She Wolf was also released as Loba in Latin America and Spain.)	Released: 9 October 2009; Label: Epic; Formats: CD, LP, digital download	1	7	3	1	1	2	1	4	15	—	US: 352,000 (Note: Sales of She Wolf in the United States as of 10 October 2014.); WW: 2,000,000 (Note: Worldwide sales of She Wolf as of 27 November 2011.)	AMPROFON: 2× Platinum+Gold; BPI: Gold; BVMI: Gold; CAPIF: Gold; FIMI: Platinum; IFPI SWI: Gold; PROMUSICAE: Platinum; SNEP: Gold
Sale el Sol (Note: An English version of Sale el Sol was released under the title The Sun Comes Out.)	Released: 19 October 2010; Label: Epic; Formats: CD, digital download	5	1	6	1	1	1	2	—	7	1	WW: 4,000,000	AMPROFON: Diamond; BVMI: Platinum; CAPIF: Platinum; FIMI: 2× Platinum; IFPI SWI: 2× Platinum; PROMUSICAE: 2× Platinum; RIAA: Diamond (Latin); SNEP: Diamond
Shakira	Released: 21 March 2014; Label: RCA; Format: CD, digital download	6	6	5	3	2	2	2	14	2	—	UK: 38,975; WW: 900,000 (Note: Worldwide sales of Shakira as of 21 April 2015.)	AMPROFON: Platinum; PROMUSICAE: Gold; SNEP: Gold
El Dorado	Released: 26 May 2017; Label: Sony Latin; Format: CD, digital download, streaming	10	9	19	12	3	2	3	54	15	1		AMPROFON: 4× Platinum+Gold; FIMI: Gold; IFPI SWI: Platinum; PROMUSICAE: Gold; RIAA: Diamond (Latin); SNEP: Platinum
Las Mujeres Ya No Lloran	Released: 22 March 2024; Label: Sony Latin; Format: CD, LP, digital download, streaming	1	12	15	27	—	1	4	— (Note: "Las Mujeres Ya No Lloran" did not enter the UK Albums Chart but debuted and peaked at number 22 on the UK Albums Downloads Chart.)	13	1		AMPROFON: 3× Platinum; FIMI: Gold; PROMUSICAE: Platinum; RIAA: 7× Platinum (Latin)
"—" denotes a recording that did not chart or was not released in that territory.

=== Reissues ===
List of reissues, with selected details and chart positions
Title	Reissue details	Peak chart positions	
Title	Reissue details	FIN	US
Laundry Service: Washed and Dried	Released: 12 November 2002; Label: Epic; Formats: CD, DVD	25	112

=== Live albums ===
List of live albums, with selected chart positions and certifications
Title	Album details	Peak chart positions										Certifications
Title	Album details	BEL (WA)	FRA	GER	ITA	NLD	POR	SPA	SWI	US	US Latin	Certifications
MTV Unplugged	Released: 29 February 2000; Label: Sony Colombia; Formats: Cassette, CD, DVD, digital download, LP	—	—	91	—	—	81	—	—	124	1	AMPROFON: 3× Platinum; BVMI: Gold; PROMUSICAE: Gold; RIAA: Gold; RIAA: 4× Platinum (Latin)
Live & off the Record (Note: Live & off the Record was released as En Vivo y en Privado in some Spanish-speaking markets.)	Released: 22 March 2004; Label: Epic; Formats: CD, DVD, digital download	43	—	14	—	4	—	73	20	45	—	AFP: Gold; AMPROFON: Gold; BVMI: 3× Gold; PROMUSICAE: Gold; RIAA: Gold; SNEP: Gold
Oral Fixation Tour	Released: 13 November 2007; Label: Epic; Formats: Blu-ray, CD, DVD, digital download	—	—	71	—	5	—	—	—	—	—	PROMUSICAE: 2× Platinum; RIAA: Platinum
Live from Paris (Note: Live from Paris was released as En Vivo desde Paris in some Spanish-speaking markets.)	Released: 5 December 2011; Label: Epic; Formats: Blu-ray, CD, DVD, digital download	16	8	43	33	25	85	18	39	—	2	AMPROFON: 2× Platinum; SNEP: Platinum
Shakira in Concert: El Dorado World Tour	Released: 13 November 2019; Label: Sony Latin; Formats: Digital download, streaming	—	—	—	—	—	—	—	—	—	18	
"—" denotes a recording that did not chart or was not released in that territory.

=== Compilation albums ===
List of compilation albums, with selected chart positions and certifications
Title	Album details	Peak chart positions										Certifications
Title	Album details	ARG	BEL (FL)	BEL (WA)	ITA	POR	SPA	SWE	SWI	US	US Latin	Certifications
The Remixes	Released: 21 October 1997; Label: Sony Colombia; Formats: CD, cassette, digital download	—	—	—	—	—	—	—	—	—	21	RIAA: 2× Platinum (Latin)
Colección de Oro	Released: 22 January 2002; Label: Sony Colombia; Formats: CD	—	—	—	—	—	—	—	—	—	—	
Grandes Éxitos	Released: 5 November 2002; Label: Sony Colombia; Formats: CD, digital download	8	—	—	—	14	36	22	49	80	1	AFP: Silver; CAPIF: 3× Platinum; PROMUSICAE: Platinum; RIAA: 2× Platinum (Latin)
Oral Fixation, Vol. 1 & 2	Released: 5 December 2006; Label: Epic; Format: CD/DVD, digital download	—	47	78	86	—	25	—	91	—	27	PROMUSICAE: Gold
"—" denotes a recording that did not chart or was not released in that territory.

== Extended plays ==
=== Live extended plays ===
List of live extended plays, with selected details
Title	Extended play details
Anniversary: Oral Fixation (20th) and Pies Descalzos (30th) Live	Released: 22 October 2025; Label: Ace, Sony Latin; Formats: Streaming

== Singles ==
=== As a lead artist ===
==== 1990s ====
List of singles as lead artist, with selected chart positions, showing year released and album name
Title	Year	Peak chart positions										Certifications	Album
Title	Year	BEL (FL)	BEL (WA)	FRA	MEX	NLD	SPA	SWI	US Latin	US Latin Pop	VEN	Certifications	Album
"Magia"	1991	—	—	—	—	—	—	—	—	—	—		Magia
"Tú Serás la Historia de Mi Vida"	1993	—	—	—	—	—	—	—	—	—	—		Peligro
"Estoy Aquí"	1995	—	—	—	2	—	5	—	2	1	1	AMPROFON: Diamond+2× Platinum+Gold; PROMUSICAE: Gold	Pies Descalzos
"¿Dónde Estás Corazón?" (Note: "¿Dónde Estás, Corazón?" was first included on the compilation album Nuestro Rock Volumen II in 1994.)	1996	—	—	—	—	—	—	—	5	3	—	AMPROFON: 4× Platinum+Gold	Pies Descalzos
"Pies Descalzos, Sueños Blancos"	1996	—	—	—	5	—	—	—	—	11	—	AMPROFON: Diamond	Pies Descalzos
"Un Poco de Amor"	1996	—	—	—	—	—	—	—	—	11	1		Pies Descalzos
"Antología"	1997	—	—	—	—	—	—	—	15	3	—	AMPROFON: 4× Diamond+4× Platinum+Gold	Pies Descalzos
"Se Quiere, Se Mata"	1997	—	—	—	—	—	—	—	8	1	—		Pies Descalzos
"Ciega, Sordomuda"	1998	—	—	—	—	—	7	—	1	1	1	AMPROFON: 2× Diamond+4× Platinum; PROMUSICAE: Platinum; RIAA: Gold	Dónde Están Los Ladrones?
"Tú"	1998	—	—	—	—	—	—	—	1	1	—	AMPROFON: Diamond+Platinum+Gold	Dónde Están Los Ladrones?
"Inevitable"	1998	—	—	—	—	—	—	—	3	2	—	AMPROFON: 3× Diamond; PROMUSICAE: Platinum	Dónde Están Los Ladrones?
"No Creo"	1999	—	—	—	—	—	—	—	9	2	—		Dónde Están Los Ladrones?
"Ojos Así"	1999	29	16	15	—	25	—	33	22	9	—	AMPROFON: Diamond; RIAA: Gold	Dónde Están Los Ladrones?
"Moscas en la Casa"	1999	—	—	—	—	—	—	—	25	10	—	AMPROFON: Diamond	Dónde Están Los Ladrones?
"—" denotes a recording that did not chart or was not released in that territory.

==== 2000s ====
List of singles as lead artist, with selected chart positions, showing year released and album name
Title	Year	Peak chart positions										Certifications	Album
Title	Year	AUS	BEL (WA)	FRA	GER	ITA	SPA	SWI	UK	US	US Latin	Certifications	Album
"Whenever, Wherever" / "Suerte"	2001	1	1	1	1	1	1	1	2	6	1	AMPROFON: 3× Platinum+Gold; AMPROFON: Diamond+Platinum ("Suerte"); ARIA: 4× Platinum; BEA: 2× Platinum; BPI: 3× Platinum; BVMI: 3× Gold; FIMI: Gold; IFPI SWI: 2× Platinum; PROMUSICAE: Gold; PROMUSICAE: Platinum ("Suerte"); RIAA: 2× Platinum; NVPI: Platinum; SNEP: Diamond	Laundry Service
"Underneath Your Clothes"	2002	1	7	2	2	3	—	2	3	9	— (Note: "Underneath Your Clothes" was not allowed to chart within the Billboard Hot Latin Songs, but peaked at number 40 on the Latin Pop Songs chart.)	AMPROFON: 2× Platinum+Gold; ARIA: 2× Platinum; BEA: 2× Platinum; BPI: Gold; BVMI: Gold; IFPI SWI: Platinum; RIAA: Gold; SNEP: Gold	Laundry Service
"Objection (Tango)" / "Te Aviso, Te Anuncio (Tango)"	2002	2	8	10	19	6	—	10	17	55	16	AMPROFON: Gold; AMPROFON: 2× Platinum+Gold (Spanish version); ARIA: Platinum; SNEP: Gold	Laundry Service
"Te Dejo Madrid"	2002	—	—	—	—	—	7	—	—	—	45	AMPROFON: Platinum+Gold	Laundry Service
"Que Me Quedes Tú"	2002	—	—	—	—	—	10	—	—	—	1	AMPROFON: 4× Platinum	Laundry Service
"The One"	2003	16	21	—	39	20	—	17	—	—	—		Laundry Service
"La Tortura" (featuring Alejandro Sanz)	2005	—	5	7	4	3	1	2	—	23	1	AMPROFON: 2× Diamond+3× Platinum; BPI: Silver; BVMI: Gold; FIMI: Gold; IFPI SWI: Gold; PROMUSICAE: 2× Platinum; RIAA: Platinum; RIAA: 32× Platinum (Latin)	Fijación Oral Vol. 1
"No" (featuring Gustavo Cerati)	2005	—	—	—	—	—	—	—	—	—	11	AMPROFON: 4× Platinum	Fijación Oral Vol. 1
"Don't Bother"	2005	30	32	24	7	8	—	8	9	42	—	RIAA: Gold	Oral Fixation Vol. 2
"Día de Enero"	2006	—	—	—	—	—	—	—	—	—	29	AMPROFON: 3× Diamond+4× Platinum; PROMUSICAE: Gold	Fijación Oral Vol. 1
"Hips Don't Lie" / "Será Será (Las Caderas No Mienten)" (featuring Wyclef Jean)	2006	1	1	1	1	1	1	1	1	1	1	AMPROFON: 2× Diamond+Gold; AMPROFON: Platinum (Spanish version); AMPROFON: Platinum+Gold (Clean version); AMPROFON: 2× Gold (Bamboo); ARIA: 6× Platinum; BEA: Platinum; BPI: 5× Platinum; BVMI: 3× Platinum; FIMI: 2× Platinum; IFPI SWI: Platinum; PROMUSICAE: 3× Platinum; RIAA: 2× Platinum; SNEP: Gold	Oral Fixation Vol. 2
"Illegal" (featuring Carlos Santana)	2006	—	16	—	11	4	—	10	34	—	—		Oral Fixation Vol. 2
"Las de la Intuición" / "Pure Intuition"	2007	—	—	—	—	—	—	—	—	—	31	AMPROFON: 2× Diamond+Gold; PROMUSICAE: 7× Platinum	Fijación Oral Vol. 1
"Beautiful Liar" (with Beyoncé)	2007	5	5	1	1	1	—	1	1	3	10	ARIA: 2× Platinum; BEA: Gold; BPI: Platinum; BVMI: Gold; PROMUSICAE: 5× Platinum; RIAA: 3× Platinum	B'Day
"She Wolf" / "Loba"	2009	18	5	4	2	3	2	3	4	11	1	AMPROFON: 2× Diamond+Gold; ARIA: Gold; BPI: Platinum; BVMI: Gold; FIMI: Platinum; IFPI SWI: Gold; PROMUSICAE: Platinum; RIAA: Platinum	She Wolf
"Did It Again" / "Lo Hecho Está Hecho"	2009	—	— (Note: "Did It Again" did not chart within the Walloon Ultratop 50, but peaked at number six on the Walloon Ultratip chart.)	—	34	15	12	29	26	— (Note: "Did It Again" did not chart within the Billboard Hot 100, but peaked at number five on the Bubbling Under Hot 100 chart.)	6	AMPROFON: 2× Platinum+Gold; PROMUSICAE: Gold	She Wolf
"Give It Up to Me" (featuring Lil Wayne)	2009	— (Note: "Give It Up Again" did not chart within the Australian Top 100 Singles chart, but peaked at number 35 on the Australian Top 50 Physical Singles chart.)	—	—	—	—	—	—	—	29	—	RIAA: Gold	She Wolf
"—" denotes a recording that did not chart or was not released in that territory.

==== 2010s ====
List of singles as lead artist, with selected chart positions, showing year released and album name
Title	Year	Peak chart positions										Certifications	Album
Title	Year	BEL (WA)	FRA	GER	ITA	MEX	SPA	SWI	UK	US	US Latin	Certifications	Album
"Gypsy" / "Gitana"	2010	40	—	7	14	1	3	12	—	65	6	AMPROFON: Platinum+Gold; AMPROFON: Gold ("Gitana"); PROMUSICAE: Platinum	She Wolf
"Waka Waka (This Time for Africa)" / "Waka Waka (Ésto Es África)" (featuring Freshlyground)	2010	1	1	1	1	16	1	1	21	38	2	AMPROFON: Diamond+2× Platinum+Gold; ARIA: Gold; BEA: 2× Platinum; BPI: 3× Platinum; BVMI: 4× Platinum; FIMI: 6× Platinum; IFPI SWI: 3× Platinum; PROMUSICAE: 6× Platinum; RIAA: Platinum; SNEP: Platinum	Listen Up! The Official 2010 FIFA World Cup Album
"Loca" (featuring Dizzee Rascal or El Cata)	2010	1	2	6	1	2	1	1	—	32	1	AMPROFON: Diamond+2× Platinum; BEA: Gold; BVMI: Gold; FIMI: 2× Platinum; IFPI SWI: Platinum; PROMUSICAE: 2× Platinum	Sale el Sol
"Sale el Sol"	2011	— (Note: "Sale el Sol" did not chart within the Walloon Ultratop 50, but peaked at number 15 on the Walloon Ultratip chart.)	—	—	—	4	8	—	—	—	10	AMPROFON: Gold; PROMUSICAE: Gold; RIAA: Platinum (Latin)	Sale el Sol
"Rabiosa" (featuring Pitbull or El Cata)	2011	5	6	26	6	4	1	3	—	— (Note: "Rabiosa" did not chart within the Billboard Hot 100, but peaked at number ten on the Bubbling Under Hot 100 chart.)	8	AMPROFON: 3× Platinum+Gold; BEA: Gold; FIMI: Platinum; IFPI SWI: Gold; PROMUSICAE: Gold (English version); PROMUSICAE: 2× Platinum	Sale el Sol
"Antes de las Seis"	2011	—	—	—	—	18	—	—	—	—	21	AMPROFON: Gold	Sale el Sol
"Je L'Aime à Mourir"	2011	1	1	—	—	—	—	18	—	—	—	BEA: Gold; IFPI SWI: Gold; SNEP: Gold	Live from Paris
"Addicted to You"	2012	18	15	—	48	5	14	70	—	—	9	AMPROFON: Diamond+2× Platinum+Gold; PROMUSICAE: Gold	Sale el Sol
"Can't Remember to Forget You" / "Nunca Me Acuerdo de Olvidarte" (Note: The Spanish-language version, "Nunca Me Acuerdo de Olvidarte", does not feature Rihanna's vocals.) (featuring Rihanna)	2014	6	5	8	13	1	2	7	11	15	6	AMPROFON: Platinum; AMPROFON: Platinum (Spanish version); ARIA: Platinum; BPI: Platinum; BVMI: Gold; FIMI: Platinum; IFPI SWI: Gold; PROMUSICAE: Platinum	Shakira
"Empire"	2014	— (Note: "Empire" did not chart within the Walloon Ultratop 50, but peaked at number 29 on the Walloon Ultratip chart.)	82	—	—	— (Note: "Empire" did not chart within the Billboard Mexico Airplay chart, but peaked at number 37 on the Billboard Mexico Espanol Airplay chart.)	29	—	25	58	—	AMPROFON: Gold; RIAA: Platinum	Shakira
"Dare (La La La) / "La La La (Brazil 2014)" (featuring Carlinhos Brown)	2014	3	11	12	3	6	2	3	—	53	— (Note: "Dare (La La La)" was not allowed to chart within the Billboard Hot Latin Songs, but peaked at number five on the Latin Pop Songs chart.)	AMPROFON: Gold ("Dare (La La La)"); AMPROFON: Gold ("La La La (Brazil 2014)"); BVMI: Gold; FIMI: Platinum; IFPI SWI: Gold; PROMUSICAE: Gold; RIAA: Platinum	Shakira
"Medicine" (featuring Blake Shelton)	2014	—	—	—	—	—	—	—	—	— (Note: "Medicine" did not chart within the Billboard Hot 100, but peaked at number 16 on the Bubbling Under Hot 100 chart.)	—		Shakira
"Try Everything"	2016	— (Note: "Try Everything" did not chart within the Walloon Ultratop 50, but peaked at number nine on the Walloon Ultratip chart.)	43	54	—	—	—	55	186	63	—	BPI: Platinum; RIAA: 4× Platinum; SNEP: Gold	Zootopia
"La Bicicleta" (Note: "La Bicicleta" was first included on Carlos Vives's album Vives.) (with Carlos Vives)	2016	— (Note: "La Bicicleta" did not chart within the Walloon Ultratop 50, but peaked at number 29 on the Walloon Ultratip chart.)	31	—	75	1	1	54	—	95	2	AMPROFON: 3× Diamond+2× Platinum+Gold; FIMI: Platinum; IFPI SWI: Gold; PROMUSICAE: 7× Platinum; RIAA: 43× Platinum (Latin); SNEP: Gold	El Dorado
"Chantaje" (featuring Maluma)	2016	19	15	20	11	3	1	10	—	51	1	AMPROFON: 3× Diamond; BEA: Platinum; BPI: Gold; BVMI: Platinum; FIMI: 3× Platinum; IFPI SWI: Platinum; PROMUSICAE: 5× Platinum; RIAA: 16× Platinum (Latin); SNEP: Diamond	El Dorado
"Deja Vu" (Note: "Deja Vu" was first included on Prince Royce's album Five.) (with Prince Royce)	2017	—	106	—	—	— (Note: "Deja Vu" did not chart within the Billboard Mexico Airplay chart, but peaked at number 26 on the Billboard Mexico Espanol Airplay chart.)	16	92	—	— (Note: "Deja Vu" did not chart within the Billboard Hot 100, but peaked at number seven on the Bubbling Under Hot 100 chart.)	4	AMPROFON: Diamond+Platinum; FIMI: Gold; PROMUSICAE: 3× Platinum; RIAA: 15× Platinum (Latin)	El Dorado
"Comme moi" (Note: "Comme moi" was first included on Black M's album Éternel insatisfait.) (with Black M)	2017	— (Note: "Comme moi" did not chart within the Walloon Ultratop 50, but peaked at number eleven on the Walloon Ultratip chart.)	35	—	—	—	—	—	—	—	—	SNEP: Gold	El Dorado
"Me Enamoré"	2017	17	42	—	—	3	5	32	—	83	4	AMPROFON: Diamond+2× Platinum+Gold; FIMI: Gold; IFPI SWI: Platinum; PROMUSICAE: 3× Platinum; SNEP: Platinum	El Dorado
"Perro Fiel" (featuring Nicky Jam)	2017	— (Note: "Perro Fiel" did not chart within the Walloon Ultratop 50, but peaked at number 28 on the Walloon Ultratip chart.)	—	—	—	1	5	62	—	100	6	AMPROFON: Diamond+4× Platinum; FIMI: Gold; IFPI SWI: Gold; PROMUSICAE: 3× Platinum	El Dorado
"Trap" (featuring Maluma)	2018	—	—	—	—	25	—	—	—	—	17	AMPROFON: Platinum+Gold	El Dorado
"Clandestino" (with Maluma)	2018	— (Note: "Clandestino" did not chart within the Walloon Ultratop 50, but peaked at number 14 on the Walloon Ultratip chart.)	—	—	76	1	13	32	—	— (Note: "Clandestino" did not chart within the Billboard Hot 100, but peaked at number 15 on the Bubbling Under Hot 100 chart.)	7	AMPROFON: Diamond+2× Platinum+Gold; PROMUSICAE: 2× Platinum	Non-album single
"Nada"	2018	—	—	—	—	—	—	—	—	—	47	AMPROFON: Platinum	El Dorado
"—" denotes a recording that did not chart or was not released in that territory.

==== 2020s ====
List of singles as lead artist, with selected chart positions, showing year released and album name
Title	Year	Peak chart positions										Certifications	Album
Title	Year	COL	ARG	FRA	ITA	MEX	SPA	SWI	US	US Latin	WW	Certifications	Album
"Me Gusta" (with Anuel AA)	2020	3	18	—	62	4	2	42	— (Note: "Me Gusta" did not chart within the Billboard Hot 100, but peaked at number 16 on the Bubbling Under Hot 100 chart.)	6	—	AMPROFON: 4× Platinum+Gold; FIMI: Gold; PROMUSICAE: 3× Platinum	Non-album single
"Girl Like Me" (with Black Eyed Peas)	2020	16	53	2	—	2	79	28	67	— (Note: "Girl Like Me" was not allowed to chart within the Billboard Hot Latin Songs, but peaked at number one on the Latin Airplay chart.)	39	AMPROFON: Diamond+3× Platinum+Gold; BPI: Silver; IFPI SWI: 2× Platinum; FIMI: Platinum; PROMUSICAE: Platinum; RIAA: Platinum; SNEP: Diamond	Translation
"Don't Wait Up"	2021	— (Note: "Don't Wait Up" did not chart within the Colombian Top 20 Airplay chart, but peaked at number one on the Colombian Top 20 Anglo Airplay chart.)	—	45	—	2	—	—	—	—	—	SNEP: Platinum	Non-album single
"Te Felicito" (with Rauw Alejandro)	2022	8	1	53	—	5	2	71	67	10	11	AMPROFON: Diamond+3× Platinum; FIMI: Gold; IFPI SWI: Gold; PROMUSICAE: 7× Platinum; RIAA: 24× Platinum (Latin); SNEP: Gold	Las Mujeres Ya No Lloran
"Don't You Worry" (with Black Eyed Peas and David Guetta)	2022	— (Note: "Don't You Worry" did not chart within the Colombian Top 20 Airplay chart, but peaked at number 18 on the Colombian Top 20 Anglo Airplay chart.)	—	14	15	2	69	69	— (Note: "Don't You Worry" did not chart within the Billboard Hot 100, but peaked at number 22 on the Bubbling Under Hot 100 chart.)	—	103	IFPI SWI: Gold; FIMI: 2× Platinum; PROMUSICAE: Platinum; SNEP: Diamond	Elevation
"Monotonía" (with Ozuna)	2022	3	7	137	67	2	2	3	65	3	18	AMPROFON: 4× Platinum+Gold; FIMI: Gold; PROMUSICAE: 4× Platinum; RIAA: 16× Platinum (Latin); SNEP: Gold	Las Mujeres Ya No Lloran
"Shakira: Bzrp Music Sessions, Vol. 53" (with Bizarrap)	2023	1	1	20	1	1	1	2	9	1	2	AMPROFON: Diamond+Platinum+Gold; FIMI: 3× Platinum; PROMUSICAE: 7× Platinum; RIAA: Gold; SNEP: Platinum	Las Mujeres Ya No Lloran
"TQG" (Note: "TQG" was first included on Karol G's album Mañana Será Bonito.) (with Karol G)	2023	1	2	30	44	1	1	5	7	1	1	FIMI: Platinum; PROMUSICAE: 8× Platinum; SNEP: Diamond; IFPI SWI: Gold	Las Mujeres Ya No Lloran
"Acróstico"	2023	1	11	—	—	10	1	41	84	16	12	AMPROFON: 3× Platinum; PROMUSICAE: 3× Platinum; RIAA: 4× Platinum (Latin)	Las Mujeres Ya No Lloran
"Copa Vacía" (with Manuel Turizo)	2023	13	36	—	—	— (Note: "Copa Vacía" did not chart within the Billboard Mexico Songs, but peaked at number two on the Monitor Latino Mexico Airplay chart.)	16	100	—	31	55	AMPROFON: Platinum+Gold; PROMUSICAE: 2× Platinum; RIAA: 5× Platinum (Latin)	Las Mujeres Ya No Lloran
"El Jefe" (with Fuerza Regida)	2023	7	43	—	—	10	12	—	55	4	24	AMPROFON: 2× Platinum+Gold; PROMUSICAE: Gold; RIAA: 8× Platinum (Latin)	Las Mujeres Ya No Lloran
"Puntería" (with Cardi B)	2024	14	61	—	—	— (Note: "Puntería" did not chart within the Billboard Mexico Songs, but peaked at number 19 on the Monitor Latino Mexico Airplay chart.)	37	62	72	3	69	AMPROFON: Gold; PROMUSICAE: Gold; RIAA: 3× Platinum (Latin)	Las Mujeres Ya No Lloran
"(Entre Paréntesis)" (with Grupo Frontera)	2024	—	—	—	—	— (Note: "(Entre Paréntesis)" did not chart within the Billboard Mexico Songs, but peaked at number one on the Monitor Latino Mexico Airplay chart.)	—	—	— (Note: "(Entre Paréntesis)" did not chart within the Billboard Hot 100, but peaked at number 20 on the Bubbling Under Hot 100 chart.)	22	—	AMPROFON: Platinum+Gold; RIAA: 4× Platinum (Latin)	Las Mujeres Ya No Lloran
"Soltera"	2024	5	7	—	—	25	4	—	— (Note: "Soltera" did not chart within the Billboard Hot 100, but peaked at number 13 on the Bubbling Under Hot 100 chart.)	9	28	PROMÚSICA: Platinum; AMPROFON: 3× Platinum; PROMUSICAE: 2× Platinum; RIAA: Platinum (Latin)	Non-album single
"Bésame" (with Alejandro Sanz)	2025	— (Note: "Bésame" did not chart within the Billboard Colombia Hot 100 chart, but peaked at number four on the Monitor Latino Colombian Top 20 Airplay chart.)	9	—	—	— (Note: "Bésame" did not chart within the Billboard Mexico Songs chart, but peaked at number 16 on the Monitor Latino Mexico Airplay chart.)	66	—	—	— (Note: "Bésame" did not chart within the Billboard Hot Latin Songs, but peaked at number seven on the Latin Airplay chart.)	—	AMPROFON: Gold; PROMUSICAE: Gold; RIAA: Gold (Latin)	¿Y Ahora Qué?
"Hips Don't Lie" (with Ed Sheeran and Beéle)	2025	21	73	101	—	— (Note: "Hips Don't Lie (Anniversary Version)" did not chart within the Billboard Mexico Songs chart, but peaked at number four on the Monitor Latino Mexico Pop Airplay chart.)	—	—	—	—	—		Anniversary: Oral Fixation (20th) and Pies Descalzos (30th) Live
"Zoo"	2025	— (Note: "Zoo" did not chart within the Billboard Colombia Hot 100 chart, but peaked at number 13 on the Monitor Latino Colombian Anglo Top 20 Airplay chart.)	— (Note: "Zoo" did not chart within the Billboard Argentina Hot 100 chart, but peaked at number 16 on the Monitor Latino Argentine Anglo Top 20 Airplay chart.)	16	—	— (Note: "Zoo" did not chart within the Billboard Mexico Songs chart, but peaked at number 17 on the Monitor Latino Mexican Anglo Top 20 Airplay chart.)	—	39	73	—	17	BPI: Silver; SNEP: Diamond	Zootopia 2
"Algo Tú" (with Beéle)	2026	10	69	—	—	— (Note: "Algo Tú" did not chart within the Billboard Mexico Songs chart, but peaked at number five on the Monitor Latino Mexico Pop Airplay chart.)	84	—	—	26	—		Non-album single
"Choka Choka" (with Anitta)	2026	—	—	—	—	—	—	—	—	— (Note: "Choka Choka" did not chart within the Billboard Hot Latin Songs, but peaked at number five on the Latin Digital Songs chart.)	—		Equilibrium
"Dai Dai" (with Burna Boy)	2026	1	1	1	1	— (Note: "Dai Dai" did not chart within the Billboard Mexico Songs chart, but peaked at number ten on the Monitor Latino Mexico Airplay chart.)	2	1	17	— (Note: "Dai Dai" was not allowed to chart within the Billboard Hot Latin Songs, but peaked at number one on the Latin Airplay chart.)	1	BPI: Gold; PROMÚSICA: Gold; FIMI: Gold; PROMUSICAE: 2× Platinum; RIAA: 19× Platinum (Latin); SNEP: Diamond	Official FIFA World Cup 2026 Album
"Agua" (with Maluma)	2026	5	3	—	—	—	12	—	—	19	—		Non-album single
"—" denotes a recording that did not chart or was not released in that territory.

=== As a featured artist ===
List of singles as a featured artist, with selected chart positions, showing year released and album name
Title	Year	Peak chart positions									Certifications	Album
Title	Year	FRA	AUS	ITA	MEX	SPA	SWI	UK	US	US Latin	Certifications	Album
"Te Lo Agradezco, Pero No" (Alejandro Sanz featuring Shakira)	2007	—	—	—	—	—	—	—	— (Note: "Te Lo Agradezco, Pero No" did not chart within the Billboard Hot 100, but peaked at number 24 on the Bubbling Under Hot 100 chart.)	1	PROMUSICAE: Platinum	El Tren de los Momentos
"Si Tú No Vuelves" (Miguel Bosé featuring Shakira)	2007	—	—	—	—	—	—	—	—	—	PROMUSICAE: Gold	Papito
"Sing" (Annie Lennox featuring various artists)	2007	—	—	—	—	—	—	161	—	—		Songs of Mass Destruction
"Get It Started" (Pitbull featuring Shakira)	2012	57	31	42	22	14	32	64	89	48	AMPROFON: Gold; ARIA: Gold	Global Warming
"Dançando" (Ivete Sangalo featuring Shakira)	2013	—	—	—	—	—	—	—	—	—		Real Fantasia
"Mi Verdad" (Maná featuring Shakira)	2015	—	—	—	5	20	—	—	— (Note: "Mi Verdad" did not chart within the Billboard Hot 100, but peaked at number 19 on the Bubbling Under Hot 100 chart.)	1	AMPROFON: Gold; PROMUSICAE: 2× Platinum; RIAA: 5× Platinum (Latin)	Cama Incendiada
"Y, ¿Si Fuera Ella? (+ Es +)" (Alejandro Sanz featuring various artists)	2017	—	—	—	—	16	—	—	—	—	PROMUSICAE: Gold	+ Es +
"—" denotes a recording that did not chart or was not released in that territory.

=== Charity singles ===
List of charity singles with chart positions, showing year released and notes
Title	Year	Peaks		Notes
Title	Year	SPA	US Bub.	Notes
"El Ultimo Adios (The Last Goodbye)" (among Artists for 9/11 attacks)	2001	—	—	To commemorate the September 11 attacks and support the families of the victims. Proceeds of the recording went to the American Red Cross and the United Way.
"What More Can I Give" (among the All Stars)	2003	—	—	To commemorate the victims of 11 September attacks.
"Somos El Mundo 25 Por Haiti" (among Artists for Haiti)	2010	31	15	To raise money for Haitian earthquake victims.
"Ay Haiti" (among Artists for Haiti)	2010	—	—	To raise money for Haitian earthquake victims.
"Gracias a la Vida" (among Artists for Chile)	2010	—	—	To raise money for the 2010 Chile earthquake victims.
"—" denotes a recording that did not chart or was not released in that territory.

=== Promotional singles ===
List of promotional singles, with selected chart positions, showing year released and album name
Title	Year	Peak chart positions					Certifications	Album
Title	Year	CIS	SPA	SWE	URU	US Latin Pop	Certifications	Album
"Eres"	1993	—	—	—	—	—		Peligro
"Quiero"	1996	—	—	—	—	18		Pies Descalzos
"Dónde Están los Ladrones?"	1998	—	—	—	—	—		Dónde Están los Ladrones?
"Si Te Vas"	1999	—	—	—	—	—	AMPROFON: Diamond+2× Platinum; PROMUSICAE: Gold	Dónde Están los Ladrones?
"Octavo Día"	2000	—	—	—	—	—		Dónde Están los Ladrones?
"Ask for More"	2001	—	—	—	—	—		Non-album promotional single
"Fool"	2001	—	—	—	—	—		Laundry Service
"Knock on My Door"	2002	—	—	—	—	—		Non-album promotional single
"Poem to a Horse"	2004	—	—	—	1	—		Live & Off the Record
"Hay Amores"	2008	147	—	—	—	—		Love in the Time of Cholera
"Good Stuff"	2009	—	49	—	—	—		She Wolf
"I'll Stand by You" (featuring The Roots)	2010	—	—	53	—	—		Hope for Haiti Now
"Blanca Mujer" (Draco Rosa featuring Shakira)	2013	—	—	—	—	—		Vida
"—" denotes a title that did not chart, or was not released in that territory.

== Other charted and certified songs ==
List of other charted and certified songs, with selected chart positions, showing year released and album name
Title	Year	Peak chart positions										Certifications	Album
Title	Year	ARG	MEX Español	NOR	NZ Hot	SPA	SWE	UK	US Bub.	US Latin	US Latin Pop	Certifications	Album
"Día Especial"	2005	—	—	—	—	—	—	—	—	—	26		Fijación Oral, Vol. 1
"Despedida"	2008	—	—	—	—	—	—	—	—	— (Note: "Despedida" did not chart within the Billboard Hot Latin Songs, but peaked at number 32 on the Latin Digital Songs chart.)	—		Love in the Time of Cholera
"Gordita" (featuring Calle 13)	2010	—	27	—	—	—	—	—	—	— (Note: "Gordita" did not chart within the Billboard Hot Latin Songs, but peaked at number 10 on the Latin Digital Songs chart.)	—	AMPROFON: 2× Platinum	Sale el Sol
"Lo Que Más"	2010	—	—	—	—	—	—	—	—	— (Note: "Lo Que Más" did not chart within the Billboard Hot Latin Songs, but peaked at number 28 on the Latin Digital Songs chart.)	—		Sale el Sol
"Islands"	2010	—	—	—	—	—	—	—	—	— (Note: "Islands" did not chart within the Billboard Hot Latin Songs, but peaked at number 39 on the Latin Digital Songs chart.)	—		Sale el Sol
"Devoción"	2010	—	—	—	—	—	—	—	—	— (Note: "Devoción" did not chart within the Billboard Hot Latin Songs, but peaked at number 40 on the Latin Digital Songs chart.)	—		Sale el Sol
"Mariposas"	2010	—	—	—	—	—	—	—	—	— (Note: "Mariposas" did not chart within the Billboard Hot Latin Songs, but peaked at number 47 on the Latin Digital Songs chart.)	—		Sale el Sol
"Loca por Ti" / "Boig per Tu"	2014	—	—	—	—	1	—	—	—	— (Note: "Loca por Ti" / "Boig per Tu" did not chart within the Billboard Hot Latin Songs, but peaked at number 19 on the Latin Digital Songs chart.)	—		Shakira
"Amarillo"	2017	—	—	—	—	—	—	—	—	—	—	AMPROFON: Platinum+Gold	El Dorado
"Tutu (Remix)" (with Camilo and Pedro Capó)	2019	—	—	—	—	98	—	—	—	—	—	PROMUSICAE: Gold	Por Primera Vez
"La Fuerte" (with Bizarrap)	2024	95	—	—	—	67	—	—	—	—	—	RIAA: Gold (Latin)	Las Mujeres Ya No Lloran
"Cohete" (with Rauw Alejandro)	2024	—	—	—	—	28	—	—	—	48	—	RIAA: Platinum (Latin)	Las Mujeres Ya No Lloran
"Cómo Dónde y Cuándo"	2024	—	—	—	—	—	—	—	—	—	—	RIAA: Gold (Latin)	Las Mujeres Ya No Lloran
"Nassau"	2024	—	—	—	—	—	—	—	—	—	—	RIAA: Gold (Latin)	Las Mujeres Ya No Lloran
"Última"	2024	—	—	—	—	—	—	—	—	— (Note: "Última" did not chart within the Billboard Hot Latin Songs, but peaked at number 9 on the Latin Digital Songs chart.)	18	RIAA: Platinum (Latin)	Las Mujeres Ya No Lloran
"Eurosummer" (with Zara Larsson)	2026	—	—	93	16	—	17	83	14	—	—		Midnight Sun: Girls Trip
"—" denotes a title that did not chart, or was not released in that territory.

== Other appearances ==
Title	Year	Other artist(s)	Album
"Amor (Celos de Ti)"	1996	—N/a	Al Compas de un Sentimiento
"Always on My Mind"	2002	—N/a	Divas Las Vegas
"King and Queen"	2007	Wyclef Jean	Carnival Vol. II: Memoirs of an Immigrant
"La Maza"	2009	Mercedes Sosa	Cantora 1
"Todos Juntos"	2011	Dora the Explorer	We Did It! Dora's Greatest Hits
"Ven Devórame Otra Vez"	2023	Jonathan Enrique	—N/a
"Eurosummer" (Girls Trip)	2026	Zara Larsson	Midnight Sun: Girls Trip

== Footnotes ==
Notes for peak chart positions

== See also ==
- List of best-selling music artists
- List of best-selling albums in Argentina
- List of best-selling albums in Colombia
- List of best-selling albums in Chile
- List of best-selling albums in France
- List of best-selling albums in Mexico
- List of best-selling albums in Portugal
- List of best-selling Latin albums in the United States
- List of best-selling Latin music artists
- List of best-selling albums of the 21st century
- List of best-selling remix albums
- Shakira videography
- List of songs recorded by Shakira
