= List of number-one Billboard Latin Pop Airplay songs of 2017 =

The Billboard Latin Pop Airplay is a chart that ranks the best-performing Spanish-language Pop music singles of the United States. Published by Billboard magazine, the data are compiled by Nielsen SoundScan based collectively on each single's weekly airplay.

== Chart history ==
Issue date	Song	Artist	Ref
January 7	"Chantaje"	Shakira featuring Maluma	
January 14	"Chantaje"	Shakira featuring Maluma	
January 21	"Chantaje"	Shakira featuring Maluma	
January 28	"Chantaje"	Shakira featuring Maluma	
February 4	"Chantaje"	Shakira featuring Maluma	
February 11	"Chantaje"	Shakira featuring Maluma	
February 18	"Chantaje"	Shakira featuring Maluma	
February 25	"Reggaetón Lento (Bailemos)"	CNCO	
March 4	"Despacito"	Luis Fonsi featuring Daddy Yankee	
March 11	"Despacito"	Luis Fonsi featuring Daddy Yankee	
March 18	"Despacito"	Luis Fonsi featuring Daddy Yankee	
March 25	"Despacito"	Luis Fonsi featuring Daddy Yankee	
April 1	"Despacito"	Luis Fonsi featuring Daddy Yankee	
April 8	"Despacito"	Luis Fonsi featuring Daddy Yankee	
April 15	"Despacito"	Luis Fonsi featuring Daddy Yankee	
April 22	"Despacito"	Luis Fonsi featuring Daddy Yankee	
April 29	"Despacito"	Luis Fonsi featuring Daddy Yankee	
May 6	"Despacito"	Luis Fonsi and Daddy Yankee featuring Justin Bieber	
May 13	"Despacito"	Luis Fonsi and Daddy Yankee featuring Justin Bieber	
May 20	"Despacito"	Luis Fonsi and Daddy Yankee featuring Justin Bieber	
May 27	"Despacito"	Luis Fonsi and Daddy Yankee featuring Justin Bieber	
June 3	"Despacito"	Luis Fonsi and Daddy Yankee featuring Justin Bieber	
June 10	"Despacito"	Luis Fonsi and Daddy Yankee featuring Justin Bieber	
June 17	"Despacito"	Luis Fonsi and Daddy Yankee featuring Justin Bieber	
June 24	"Despacito"	Luis Fonsi and Daddy Yankee featuring Justin Bieber	
July 1	"Despacito"	Luis Fonsi and Daddy Yankee featuring Justin Bieber	
July 8	"Me Enamoré"	Shakira	
July 15	"Me Enamoré"	Shakira	
July 22	"Me Enamoré"	Shakira	
July 29	"Me Enamoré"	Shakira	
August 5	"Me Enamoré"	Shakira	
August 12	"Felices Los 4"	Maluma	
August 19	"Felices Los 4"	Maluma	
August 26	"Felices Los 4"	Maluma	
September 2	"Felices Los 4"	Maluma	
September 9	"Felices Los 4"	Maluma	
September 16	"Mi Gente"	J Balvin & Willy William	
September 23	"Mi Gente"	J Balvin & Willy William	
September 30	"Mi Gente"	J Balvin & Willy William	
October 7	"Mi Gente"	J Balvin & Willy William	
October 14	"Mi Gente"	J Balvin & Willy William	
October 21	"Mi Gente"	J Balvin and Willy William featuring Beyoncé	
October 28	"Mi Gente"	J Balvin and Willy William featuring Beyoncé	
November 4	"Mi Gente"	J Balvin and Willy William featuring Beyoncé	
November 11	"Mi Gente"	J Balvin and Willy William featuring Beyoncé	
November 18	"Mi Gente"	J Balvin and Willy William featuring Beyoncé	
November 25	"Mi Gente"	J Balvin and Willy William featuring Beyoncé	
December 2	"Perro Fiel"	Shakira featuring Nicky Jam	
December 9	"Perro Fiel"	Shakira featuring Nicky Jam	
December 16	"Perro Fiel"	Shakira featuring Nicky Jam	
December 23	"Perro Fiel"	Shakira featuring Nicky Jam	
December 30	"Perro Fiel"	Shakira featuring Nicky Jam	
