= List of number-one Billboard Latin Pop Airplay songs of 2018 =

The Billboard Latin Pop Airplay is a chart that ranks the best-performing Spanish-language Pop music singles of the United States. Published by Billboard magazine, the data are compiled by Nielsen SoundScan based collectively on each single's weekly airplay.

== Chart history ==
Issue date	Song	Artist	Ref
January 3	"Perro Fiel"	Shakira featuring Nicky Jam	
January 6	"Perro Fiel"	Shakira featuring Nicky Jam	
January 13	"Perro Fiel"	Shakira featuring Nicky Jam	
January 20	"Echame La Culpa"	Luis Fonsi featuring Demi Lovato	
January 27	"Echame La Culpa"	Luis Fonsi featuring Demi Lovato	
February 3	"Echame La Culpa"	Luis Fonsi featuring Demi Lovato	
February 10	"Echame La Culpa"	Luis Fonsi featuring Demi Lovato	
February 17	"Echame La Culpa"	Luis Fonsi featuring Demi Lovato	
February 24	"Echame La Culpa"	Luis Fonsi featuring Demi Lovato	
March 3	"Echame La Culpa"	Luis Fonsi featuring Demi Lovato	
March 10	"Echame La Culpa"	Luis Fonsi featuring Demi Lovato	
March 17	"Echame La Culpa"	Luis Fonsi featuring Demi Lovato	
March 24	"Echame La Culpa"	Luis Fonsi featuring Demi Lovato	
March 31	"El Baño"	Enrique Iglesias featuring Bad Bunny	
April 7	"Echame La Culpa"	Luis Fonsi featuring Demi Lovato	
April 14	"Dura"	Daddy Yankee	
April 21	"Dura"	Daddy Yankee	
April 28	"Dura"	Daddy Yankee	
May 5	"Dura"	Daddy Yankee	
May 12	"Dura"	Daddy Yankee	
May 19	"Dura"	Daddy Yankee	
May 26	"Me Niego"	Reik featuring Ozuna & Wisin	
June 2	"X"	Nicky Jam and J Balvin	
June 9	"X"	Nicky Jam and J Balvin	
June 16	"Me Niego"	Reik featuring Ozuna & Wisin	
June 23	"Me Niego"	Reik featuring Ozuna & Wisin	
June 30	"X"	Nicky Jam and J Balvin	
July 7	"X"	Nicky Jam and J Balvin	
July 14	"X"	Nicky Jam and J Balvin	
July 21	"X"	Nicky Jam and J Balvin	
July 28	"Dura"	Daddy Yankee	
August 4	"Dura"	Daddy Yankee	
August 11	"Sin Pijama"	Becky G and Natti Natasha	
August 18	"X"	Nicky Jam and J Balvin	
August 25	"X"	Nicky Jam and J Balvin	
September 1	"X"	Nicky Jam and J Balvin	
September 8	"X"	Nicky Jam and J Balvin	
September 15	"X"	Nicky Jam and J Balvin	
September 22	"X"	Nicky Jam and J Balvin	
September 29	"Clandestino"	Shakira and Maluma	
October 6	"Clandestino"	Shakira and Maluma	
October 13	"Clandestino"	Shakira and Maluma	
October 20	"Se Vuelve Loca"	CNCO	
October 27	"Se Vuelve Loca"	CNCO	
November 3	"Clandestino"	Shakira and Maluma	
November 10	"Mala Mia"	Maluma	
November 17	"Amigos Con Derechos"	Reik & Maluma	
November 24	"No Es Justo"	J Balvin & Zion & Lennox	
December 1	"No Es Justo"	J Balvin & Zion & Lennox	
December 8	"Taki Taki"	DJ Snake featuring Selena Gomez, Ozuna and Cardi B	
December 15	"Ya No Tiene Novio"	Sebastian Yatra + Mau y Ricky	
December 22	"Hola"	Zion and Lennox	
December 29	"Mia"	Bad Bunny featuring Drake	
