= Trap (song) =

Single by Shakira featuring Maluma

from the album El Dorado
- Released: 26 January 2018
- Recorded: September 2016
- Genre: R&B; Latin trap
- Length: 3:21
- Label: Sony Latin
- Composers: Shakira; Juan Luis Londoño Arias; Rene Cano Rios; The Rudeboyz
- Lyricists: Shakira; Juan Luis Londoño Arias
- Producers: Shakira; Maluma; The Rudeboyz; Luis Fernando Ochoa

Shakira singles chronology
"Perro Fiel" (2017)	"Trap" (2018)	"Clandestino" (2018)

Maluma singles chronology
"Hola" (2017)	"Trap" (2018)	"Sólo Mía" (2018)

Music video
- "Trap" on YouTube

"Trap" is a song by Colombian singer-songwriter Shakira released as the fourth and final single from El Dorado on 26 January 2018. The track features Colombian singer Maluma; both had previously worked on "Chantaje", the lead single of the album, and the remix of Carlos Vives and Shakira's single "La Bicicleta", also included on El Dorado. Its lyrics were written by Shakira and Maluma. Its musical composition was done by Shakira, Maluma, Rene Cano Rios, Kevin Mauricio Jiménez Londoño and Bryan Snaider Lezcano Chaverra.

== Background and release ==
"Trap" was created in Barcelona in September 2016. In an interview, Shakira and Maluma shared that working on "Trap" together put them in a kind of trance. Shakira said that it's one of her most daring songs, describing it as "carnal, raw, and super sensual."

The song was released as a single on 26 January 2018. The music video for the song was released on the same day.

== Music video ==
Shakira and Maluma filmed the music video for "Trap" in Barcelona in March 2017. It was filmed on the same day as Shakira's album photoshoot. It was directed by her longtime collaborator Jaume de Laiguana. Shakira began posting different teases of the video on her social networks on 23 January 2018, and Maluma did the same on his social media the following day. Shakira announced the release of the video the day before its release. It was eventually released on 26 January.

Filmed in black and white, the video showcases Shakira and Maluma surmerging into and emerging from steamy water. Infobae described the video as "one of the most powerful and unforgettable short films in the career of this acclaimed artist".

The video got over 13 million views on YouTube in two days after release, and 70 million in less than a month.

== Charts ==
Chart (2018)	Peak position
Mexico (Billboard Mexican Airplay)	25
Romania (Airplay 100)	98
US Hot Latin Songs (Billboard)	17
US Latin Digital Song Sales (Billboard)	14
US Latin Airplay (Billboard)	34
US Latin Rhythm Airplay (Billboard)	18

== Certifications ==
Region	Certification	Certified units/sales
Mexico (AMPROFON)	Platinum+Gold	90,000^{‡}
^{‡} Sales+streaming figures based on certification alone.
