= Clandestino (Shakira and Maluma song) =

Single by Shakira and Maluma
- Released: 8 June 2018
- Genre: Reggae; reggaeton
- Length: 3:52
- Label: Sony Latin
- Songwriters: Shakira; Juan Luis Londoño; Edgar Barrera
- Producers: Shakira; Maluma; Edgar Barrera

Shakira singles chronology
"Trap" (2018)	"Clandestino" (2018)	"Nada" (2018)

Maluma singles chronology
"Hands on Me" (2018)	"Clandestino" (2018)	"Todo el Amor" (2018)

Music video
- "Clandestino" on YouTube

"Clandestino" (English: "Clandestine") is a song by Colombian singers Shakira and Maluma, released on 8 June 2018 as a stand-alone single. Shakira and Maluma worked on the song in April 2018 in Spain. It was written and produced by the two singers and Edgar Barrera. The song reached number one in Colombia, Costa Rica, Bolivia, Mexico, Panama, Paraguay, Puerto Rico and Uruguay. Additionally, it went diamond in Brazil and Mexico. The single was later included on the vinyl version (2024) of Shakira's eleventh studio album El Dorado.

== Background ==
Shakira and Maluma worked on the song in April 2018 in Barcelona, Spain, while Maluma was there for a Billboard photoshoot with Shakira. This is the fourth collaboration between the two Colombian artists, following the remix of Carlos Vives and Shakira's "La Bicicleta", "Chantaje" and "Trap". The song was speculated by Rolling Stone to be the lead single from Shakira's upcoming twelfth studio album, but was ultimately not included on the final tracklist. However, the song was included on the 2024 vinyl release of El Dorado as the 14th and final track.

== Music video ==
The music video was filmed between June 26 and 27 on a beach in Sitges, a town near Barcelona, the location of the song's recording, and was released on July 27, 2018. The video was directed by Jaume de la Iguana. Its cinematography was handled by Nono Arruga.

== Commercial performance ==
In the United States, "Clandestino" debuted at number 17 on the Hot Latin Songs chart, with first week sales of 5,000 copies. In Spain, the song debuted at number 24 on the Promusicae official singles chart and reached number 13. In Italy, it debuted at number 76, while in Switzerland, the song entered at number 32.

== Reception ==
Rolling Stone ranked the song at number six on their list of "20 Best Latin Singles of 2018". The song made Idolator's list of "The 100 Best Singles Of 2018" at number 18 calling it "the ultimate grower". The song was also ranked at number 14 on Billboard's critics' picks "The 20 Best Latin Songs of 2018".

== Accolades ==
Year	Ceremony	Award	Result
2019	Billboard Latin Music Awards	Latin Pop Song of the Year	Nominated
2019	iHeartRadio Music Awards	Latin Song of the Year	Nominated
2019	Lo Nuestro Awards	Pop/ Rock Collaboration of the Year	Nominated
2020	BMI Latin Awards	Winning song	Won

== Charts ==
=== Weekly charts ===
Chart (2018)	Peak position
Argentina (Argentina Hot 100)	8
Belgium (Ultratip Bubbling Under Flanders)	16
Belgium (Ultratip Bubbling Under Wallonia)	14
Bolivia (Monitor Latino)	1
Brazil (Top 100 Brasil)	76
Chile (Monitor Latino)	3
Colombia (Monitor Latino)	2
Colombia (National-Report)	1
Costa Rica (Monitor Latino)	1
Croatia International Airplay (HRT)	28
Dominican Republic (SODINPRO)	16
Ecuador (National-Report)	7
El Salvador (Monitor Latino)	7
France (SNEP)	79
Guatemala (Monitor Latino)	5
Greece (IFPI)	60
Hungary (Single Top 40)	11
Italy (FIMI)	76
Mexico (Billboard Mexican Airplay)	1
Panama (Monitor Latino)	1
Paraguay (Monitor Latino)	1
Peru (Monitor Latino)	13
Poland Dance (ZPAV)	14
Portugal (AFP)	40
Puerto Rico (Monitor Latino)	1
Slovakia Singles Digital (ČNS IFPI)	80
Spain (PROMUSICAE)	13
Switzerland (Schweizer Hitparade)	32
Uruguay (Monitor Latino)	1
US Bubbling Under Hot 100 (Billboard)	15
US Hot Latin Songs (Billboard)	7
US Latin Airplay (Billboard)	1
US Latin Rhythm Airplay (Billboard)	1
Venezuela (National-Report)	29

=== Year-end charts ===
Chart (2018)	Position
Argentina (Monitor Latino)	31
Bolivia (Monitor Latino)	24
Chile (Monitor Latino)	40
Colombia (Monitor Latino)	22
Costa Rica (Monitor Latino)	17
Ecuador (Monitor Latino)	59
El Salvador (Monitor Latino)	55
Guatemala (Monitor Latino)	49
México (Monitor Latino)	20
Panama (Monitor Latino)	22
Paraguay (Monitor Latino)	4
Perú (Monitor Latino)	85
Puerto Rico (Monitor Latino)	10
Spain (PROMUSICAE)	41
Uruguay (Monitor Latino)	13
US Hot Latin Songs (Billboard)	24

== Certifications ==
Region	Certification	Certified units/sales
Argentina (CAPIF)	Gold	20,000
Brazil (Pro-Música Brasil)	Diamond	160,000^{‡}
Canada (Music Canada)	Gold	40,000^{‡}
Greece (IFPI Greece)	Platinum	
Mexico (AMPROFON)	Diamond+2× Platinum+Gold	450,000^{‡}
Poland (ZPAV)	Gold	10,000^{‡}
Spain (Promusicae)	2× Platinum	80,000^{‡}
^{‡} Sales+streaming figures based on certification alone.

== See also ==
- List of Billboard number-one Latin songs of 2018
