= Comme moi =

2017 single by Black M and Shakira

Single by Black M featuring Shakira

from the album Éternel insatisfait
- Language: English; French
- Released: 31 March 2017
- Recorded: 2016
- Genre: Pop; hip hop
- Length: 3:08
- Label: Wati-B
- Songwriters: Diallo; Shakira; Nasti; Dadju; Dany Synthé
- Producers: Shakira; Black M; Supa Dups; Synthé; Dadju

Shakira singles chronology
"Deja Vu" (2017)	"Comme moi" (2017)	"Me Enamoré" (2017)

Music video
- "Comme moi" on YouTube

Audio video
- "What We Said" on YouTube

"Comme moi" (English: "Like Me") is a song by French-Guinean rapper and songwriter Black M featuring Colombian singer-songwriter Shakira. It was released on March 31, 2017 as the fifth official single from Éternel insatisfait. It was also included on Shakira's album El Dorado. Included on the latter album is also an English version of the song titled "What We Said" by Shakira featuring Magic!.

== Background and release ==
On 16 October 2016, Black M revealed that he has a collaboration with Shakira titled "Comme moi" on his second studio album Éternel Insatisfait, and that the song will be released as a single later. On 25 October 2016, Black M released an exclusive preview of "Comme Moi" on NRJ.

The song starts with Shakira singing in a romantic pop music style in English, before it switches up to a hip hop beat and Black M's rap rhymes in French.

== Music video ==
The music video for "Comme moi", filmed in November 2016, was released on 31 March 2017 and features Shakira in a blonde wig and Black M in a black tang top. It had a purple set and a black and white set. The video was viewed over 2 million times in the first 24 hours on YouTube.

== English version ==
The English version of the track, titled "What We Said", was released on May 26, 2017 on Shakira’s eleventh studio album El Dorado. It features Canadian reggae fusion band Magic!. This is the second collaboration between the two as the band was featured on Shakira’s 2014 self titled tenth studio album on a track called "Cut Me Deep".

== Charts ==
Chart (2017)	Peak position
ERROR in "CIS": Invalid position: 326. Expected number 1–200 or dash (–).
Belgium (Ultratip Bubbling Under Wallonia)	11
France (SNEP)	35

== Certification ==
Certifications and sales for "Comme Moi"
Region	Certification	Certified units/sales
France (SNEP)	Platinum	200,000^{‡}
^{‡} Sales+streaming figures based on certification alone.
