= Nada (Shakira song) =

Promotional single by Shakira

from the album El Dorado
- Released: 19 May 2017
- Recorded: 2016
- Genre: Rock; Ballad
- Length: 3:11
- Label: Sony Latin
- Composers: Shakira; Luis Fernando Ochoa
- Lyricist: Shakira
- Producers: Shakira; Ochoa; Supa Dups

Shakira chronology
"Clandestino" (2018)	"Nada" (2017)	"Tutu" (2019)

Music video
- "Nada" on YouTube

"Nada" (English: "Nothing") is a song by Colombian singer-songwriter Shakira released as a promotional single on 19 May 2017. Its lyrics were written by Shakira. Its musical composition was done by Shakira and her longtime collaborator Luis Fernando Ochoa.

== Release ==
The song was released as a promotional single for "El Dorado" on 19 May 2017, just a week before the album's release. The song was well received by both critics and fans who applauded Shakira for returning to her 90s rock ballad roots. It was considered to be an "epic house ballad".

== Music video ==
The official music video for the song was released on 3 November 2018 for the final night of her El Dorado World Tour. The video premiered during a show in Bogotá, Colombia and was then uploaded to YouTube after the show.

== Charts ==
=== Weekly charts ===
Chart (2017-2018)	Peak position
France (SNEP)	181
Romania (Airplay 100)	88
Spain (PROMUSICAE)	46
US Hot Latin Songs (Billboard)	47
US Latin Digital Song Sales (Billboard)	10

=== Year-end charts ===
Chart (2019)	Position
Venezuela Pop (Monitor Latino)	81

== Certifications ==
Region	Certification	Certified units/sales
Mexico (AMPROFON)	Platinum	60,000^{‡}
^{‡} Sales+streaming figures based on certification alone.
