= Amarillo (Shakira song) =

2017 song by Shakira

Song by Shakira

from the album El Dorado
- Genre: Latin pop; ballad
- Length: 3:40
- Label: Sony Latin
- Composers: Shakira; Luis Fernando Ochoa
- Lyricist: Shakira
- Producers: Shakira; Ochoa; Supa Dups; A.C.; Stephen McGregor

Audio video
- "Amarillo" on YouTube

"Amarillo" (English: "Yellow") is a Latin pop ballad by Colombian singer-songwriter Shakira, taken from her eleventh studio album, El Dorado (2017). The lyrics were written by Shakira. The music was composed by Shakira and Luis Fernando Ochoa, with Supa Dups as co-producers, and A.C. and Stephen McGregor as additional producers. The song was certified Platinum+Gold in Mexico.

== Composition ==
"Amarillo" is a Latin pop ballad. Lyrically the song discusses love, adoration and admiration with metaphors employing different colors. It was initially rumored that "Amarillo" was written by Shakira for Gerard Piqué, her partner at the time, due to the song's lyrics being applicable and being interpreted as referring to a romantic relationship. What fueled the rumors was also the Catalan phrase "t'estimo" ("I love you") in the lyrics, as it is Piqué's native language, and Shakira sharing a video clip of her performing the song on social media amidst separation rumors with Piqué in 2017, to which he replied with heart emojis. The song is also Piqué's favorite. However, in 2023, it was revealed by Shakira's pianist Laura Andrés in an interview that the song is in fact not written for Piqué, but "solely and exclusively" for their son Sasha.

== Live performances ==
Shakira performed "Amarillo" on the El Dorado World Tour. She played an acoustic guitar when she performed the song. The live performance of the song filmed during the tour dates in Los Angeles is featured on the live album Shakira in Concert: El Dorado World Tour (2019).

== Reception ==
Stephanie Penman from We Plug GOOD Music described the song as "a toe-tapping finger clicking mix of gorgeous penetrative drum beats, clubbed together with Shakira’s exquisite voice". Journalist Pável Gavona praised "Amarillo" as one of "the best ballads in recent history". Alejandro Gómez Lizarraga from Los 40 called the song "one of the most liked songs" from the album, noting the "very beautiful metaphors related to colors" in the lyrics. Joan Wallace from Latin Times assessed "Amarillo" as "one of the best titles along", encapsulating the song as an "up-tempo pop track with a great verse and playful chorus". Si Hawkins from The National compared the song to "Papa Don't Preach" by Madonna, but with a "pumping Europop chorus". A comparison to the Madonna song was also made by Allan Raible from ABC News, who additionally depicted how "the song blossoms into much more as it progresses". Chuck Campbell from Knoxville News Sentinel characterized "Amarillo" as "vibrant", with a "Disney-esque anthem chorus". Mike Wass from Idolator called "Amarillo" a "highlight" in his live album review.

== Certifications ==
Region	Certification	Certified units/sales
Mexico (AMPROFON)	Platinum+Gold	90,000^{‡}
^{‡} Sales+streaming figures based on certification alone.
