= Me Enamoré (Shakira song) =

Single by Shakira

from the album El Dorado
- Language: Spanish
- English title: "I Fell in Love"
- Released: 7 April 2017
- Genre: Reggaeton; rock
- Length: 3:45
- Label: Sony Latin
- Composers: Shakira; Rayito
- Lyricist: Shakira
- Producers: Shakira; Rayito; The Rudeboyz; A.C.

Shakira singles chronology
"Comme moi" (2017)	"Me Enamoré" (2017)	"Perro Fiel" (2017)

Music video
- "Me Enamoré" on YouTube

"Me Enamoré" (English: "I Fell in Love") is a song by Colombian singer-songwriter Shakira. The song was released as the second single to anticipate Shakira's eleventh studio album El Dorado on 7 April 2017, by Sony Music Latin. Its lyrics were written by Shakira. Its musical composition was done by Shakira and Rayito, who also produced the song along the co-production of The Rudeboyz and A.C.

== Artwork and release ==
On April 6, 2017, Shakira teased the song by sending personalized postcards to fans around the world revealing the cover artwork for the single, where she appears hugging a tree. She wrote in the card: "[I'm] very happy to share with all of you my new single 'Me Enamoré.' This song narrates a moment in my life when I was so in love that I was literally climbing trees". The same day she tweeted teasing "tomorrow more." The original photo used for the cover art is a nonprofessional snapshot taken in 2010, when Shakira first met her then-partner Gerard Piqué.

=== Reactions to cover art ===
The cover art's reception was negative, with memes being shared on social media and being parodied by users online. Miguel Ángel Bargueño of El País asked: "Has Shakira made the worst [single] cover art in history?". Spanish illustrator and art director Sergio Mora, who won the Latin Grammy Award for Best Recording Package in 2016 for the album artwork for El Poeta Halley by the band Love of Lesbian, stated: "It is so hideous that it turns around and borders on genius." Album cover art designer Rafa Sañudo said: "It's tacky as hell." Mario Feal noted: "Precisely the opposite of the overproduced image expected of an international star". Domingo J. Casas pointed out: "As a photo it’s ugly. As a family snapshot, it has value."

== Composition ==
"Me Enamoré" tells the story of when she fell in love with her former partner Gerard Piqué, whom she met in 2010 on the set of the music video for "Waka Waka (This Time for Africa)", the official song of the 2010 FIFA World Cup.

== Music video ==
The "Me Enamoré" official lyric video was released via Shakira's Vevo the day of the release of the song. Directed by James Zwadlo, it features the Spanish-language words along watercolor painted images, presumably for the non-Spanish speaking people to understand the song.

The music video was directed by Jaume de la Iguana and shot in Barcelona and was released on 12 May 2017. Its cinematography was handled by Nono Arruga.

The music video for the song garnered media attention due to the appearance of her former partner Gerard Piqué and became her twenty-first Vevo Certified video (collaborations included).

== Chart performance ==
In France, "Me Enamoré" debuted at number 72 on 14 April 2017, and eventually peaked at number 13. In the United States, the song debuted at number 100 on the Billboard Hot 100, where later peaked at number 83, and it peaked number 4 on the Hot Latin Songs chart. "Me Enamoré" peaked at number 3 in Spain, and has been certified three times Platinum for sales of 120,000 copies in the country.

== Accolades ==
Year	Ceremony	Award	Result
2017	Los 40 Music Awards	Los 40 Global Show Award	Nominated
2017	Your World Awards	Party-Starter Song	Nominated
2018	Billboard Latin Music Awards	Latin Pop Song of the Year	Nominated

== Live performances ==
Shakira performed live "Me Enamoré" for the first time at Univision's Upfront on 16 May 2017. Then, she performed the song ten days later at her El Dorado Album Release Party at The Temple House in Miami on 26 May 2017. She also performed the song at the El Dorado Album Launch in Barcelona on 8 June 2017. She performed the song on the sixth season finale of The Voice: la plus belle voix in June 2017 in Paris. She also performed with Coldplay's lead vocalist Chris Martin at Global Citizen Festival Hamburg on 6 July 2017.

== Credits and personnel ==
Credits adapted from Tidal and Qobuz.

- Shakira – vocals, composer, producer
- Antonio Rayo Gibo – composer, producer
- A.C. – co-producer
- Kevin ADG (The Rudeboyz) – co-producer
- Chan el Genio (The Rudeboyz) – producer
- Dave Clauss – mixing engineer, recording engineer
- Adam Ayan – mastering engineer
- Carlos Hernández Carbonell – recording engineer

== Charts ==
=== Weekly charts ===
Weekly chart performance for "Me Enamoré"
Chart (2017–20)	Peak position
Argentina (Monitor Latino)	3
Belgium (Ultratop 50 Flanders)	28
Belgium (Ultratop 50 Wallonia)	17
Bolivia (Monitor Latino)	4
Colombia (National-Report)	11
Costa Rica (Monitor Latino)	2
Chile (Monitor Latino)	2
Dominican Republic (Monitor Latino)	18
Ecuador (Monitor Latino)	12
Ecuador (National-Report)	1
El Salvador (Monitor Latino)	11
Finland Download (Latauslista)	27
France (SNEP)	13
Guatemala (Monitor Latino)	2
Latin America (Monitor Latino)	3
Mexico (Billboard Mexican Airplay)	4
Netherlands (Single Tip)	24
Panama (Monitor Latino)	5
Peru (Monitor Latino)	9
Poland Airplay (ZPAV)	1
Poland Dance (ZPAV)	2
Portugal (AFP)	48
Romania Airplay (Media Forest)	7
Scottish Singles Sales (Official Charts)	76
Spain (PROMUSICAE)	3
Switzerland (Schweizer Hitparade)	32
Ukraine Airplay (TopHit)	180
Uruguay (Monitor Latino)	2
UK Singles Downloads (OCC)	85
US Billboard Hot 100	83
US Hot Latin Songs (Billboard)	4
US Latin Airplay (Billboard)	2
US Latin Pop Airplay (Billboard)	1
Venezuela (National-Report)	27

=== Year-end charts ===
2017 year-end chart performance for "Me Enamoré"
Chart (2017)	Position
Argentina (Monitor Latino)	10
Belgium (Ultratop Wallonia)	66
Bolivia (Monitor Latino)	8
Chile (Monitor Latino)	16
Ecuador (Monitor Latino)	25
El Salvador (Monitor Latino)	21
France (SNEP)	188
Guatemala (Monitor Latino)	10
Panama (Monitor Latino)	26
Paraguay (Monitor Latino)	47
Peru (Monitor Latino)	16
Poland (ZPAV)	21
Romania (Airplay 100)	53
Spain (PROMUSICAE)	14
Switzerland (Schweizer Hitparade)	100
Uruguay (Monitor Latino)	6
US Hot Latin Songs (Billboard)	11

2018 year-end chart performance for "Me Enamoré"
Chart (2018)	Position
Argentina (Monitor Latino)	78
Romania (Airplay 100)	78

2020 year-end chart performance for "Me Enamoré"
Chart (2020)	Position
Honduras Pop Airplay (Monitor Latino)	99
Panama Pop Airplay (Monitor Latino)	79

== Certifications ==
Certifications and sales for "Me Enamoré"
Region	Certification	Certified units/sales
Argentina (CAPIF)	Platinum	40,000
Brazil (Pro-Música Brasil)	2× Platinum	120,000^{‡}
Canada (Music Canada)	Gold	40,000^{‡}
France (SNEP)	Platinum	200,000^{‡}
Italy (FIMI)	Gold	25,000^{‡}
Mexico (AMPROFON)	Diamond+2× Platinum+Gold	450,000^{‡}
Poland (ZPAV)	Platinum	50,000^{‡}
Spain (Promusicae)	3× Platinum	120,000^{‡}
Switzerland (IFPI Switzerland)	Platinum	30,000^{‡}
^{‡} Sales+streaming figures based on certification alone.

== Release history ==
Release dates for "Me Enamoré"
Region	Date	Format	Label	Ref.
Italy	7 April 2017	Digital download	Sony Latin; Ace Entertainment	
Italy	21 April 2017	Contemporary hit radio	Sony	
