= La Bicicleta =

2016 song by Carlos Vives and Shakira

Single by Carlos Vives and Shakira

from the album Vives
- Released: 27 May 2016
- Recorded: 2016
- Studio: Criteria Studios (Miami, FL)
- Genre: Vallenato; pop; reggaeton
- Length: 3:47
- Label: Sony Music Latin
- Composers: Carlos Vives; Andrés Castro
- Lyricists: Carlos Vives; Shakira
- Producers: Shakira; Carlos Vives; Andrés Castro; Luis Fernando Ochoa

Carlos Vives singles chronology
"Las Cosas de la Vida" (2015)	"La Bicicleta" (2016)	"Al Filo de tu Amor" (2017)

Shakira singles chronology
"Try Everything" (2016)	"La Bicicleta" (2016)	"Chantaje" (2016)

Music video
- "La Bicicleta on YouTube

"La Bicicleta" (transl. "The Bicycle") is a song by Colombian singer-songwriters Carlos Vives and Shakira. The track was released on May 27, 2016, as the lead single from Vives' fifteenth studio album Vives (2017). It was written by both singers and Andrés Castro, and produced by the three along with Luis Fernando Ochoa. It marks Shakira's first collaboration with a fellow Colombian artist. "La Bicicleta" was intended to be representative of both singers' homelands musical styles in Colombia. It is a track with a mixture of various musical genres – vallenato, pop and reggaeton – and it features indigenous Colombian wind instruments and accordions. Lyrically, it is a nostalgic song, describing the duo's excursion on bikes to places of their childhood. Music critics reviewed the song positively, praising it for its catchiness and inclusion of various Colombian music elements. The song won two Latin Grammy Awards at the 17th Latin Grammy Awards for Song of the Year and Record of the Year. It was later included as an album track on Shakira's eleventh studio album El Dorado (2017).

Upon its release, the single managed to peak within the top ten on numerous Billboard Latin charts, including No. 2 on the Hot Latin Songs and one on Latin Pop Airplay. A music video for "La Bicicleta" was filmed on 19 May 2016 in Barranquilla and Santa Marta under the direction of Jaume de Laiguana. The clip premiered on 8 July 2016 and it features Shakira and Vives traveling with bikes along the Caribbean coast of Colombia, visiting their hometowns Santa Marta and Barranquilla and engaging with locals in dance battles. Upon its release it was positively received by critics due to its playful nature and accurate representation of Colombian culture. The visual received the Video of the Year award at the Premio lo Nuestro in 2017. A remix version of "La Bicicleta" featuring new verses sung by Colombian singer Maluma was uploaded online on 19 August 2016.

== Background and conception ==
Prior to collaborating on "La Bicicleta", Carlos Vives wanted to collaborate musically with Shakira for a long time. The song came about after Vives presented material for his upcoming album Vives to his record label Sony Music Latin, which was interested in partnering him with Shakira. He also sent his work to Shakira, including a demo for "La Bicicleta" which was titled "Vallenato Desesperado" at the time. That was when Shakira had the first opportunity to listen to the song; she instantly liked it and accepted the offer of collaborating with Vives. Shakira added several lines to the song, which was co-produced by Andrés Castro, a long-time collaborator of Vives. She was the one who proposed that it be named "La Bicicleta" due to the numerous times the word was mentioned throughout.

The track marks Shakira's first collaboration with a fellow Colombian singer. During an interview, Vives revealed, "I've always dreamt of writing, producing and recording a song with Shakira so that together we can show our Colombia to the world. She has taken our country's music to unimaginable heights, and finally being able to collaborate with her is a realization of this dream." Shakira also said that the song was representative of both artists. On 21 May 2016, she sat for a press release in Barranquilla, where she talked about the experience of collaborating with Vives on the song, which she described as a "tribute to Colombia in many ways". Shakira posted a snippet of "La Bicicleta" along with its cover art on 24 May 2016, revealing that the song will premiere on 27 May. The cover art for the song features a beach shot with a vintage look; Leila Cabo of Billboard compared it to an old vinyl cover. "La Bicicleta" was available for digital download on 27 May 2016. "La Bicicleta" was released globally to radio stations on 20 June. Part of its promotion was extensively done by both singers' social media accounts. The song was also included as the tenth song on Shakira's eleventh studio album El Dorado (2017).

The final version of the song was written by Shakira, Vives and Andrés Castro with the same team of people handling its production along with musician Luis Fernando Ochoa. Afo Verde served as the executive producer, Dave Claus as the mixer and Adam Ayan was responsible for the audio mastering. The recording engineering was completed by Luis Barrera Jr., Carlos Hernandez Carbonell, Gustavo Celis and Andre Nascimben with the latter also handling Shakira's vocal recording. Olgui Chirino completed the additional vocal arrangement of the track. As for the instrumentation, the song features numerous instruments as part of its backing track: guitar by Ochoa, accordion by Christian Camilo Peña, caña de millo by Tato Marenco and caja and guacharaca both played by Alfredo Rosado.

== Composition ==
"La Bicicleta" opens with an indigenous Colombian wind instrument and it features elements of vallenato, pop, reggaeton and cumbia. A writer of El Universal further found Gaita in the song. Speaking about its composition, Vives noted how the duo wanted to use millo flutes characteristic of music from Barranquilla and the carnivals organized there, as well as vallenato accordions (played by Egidio Cuadrado) typical of Santa Marta. He said, "It is truly a modern song but in its content and essence, it has many elements of our region, and that connected us". According to Ana Marcos of El País the reggaeton is prominent throughout the whole song in order to increase its appeal in disco stations outside of Colombia. According to Sofía Gómez G. from the newspaper El Tiempo, dancehall elements can also be heard in the song.

Lyrically, "La Bicicleta" describes the duo's bike ride beside the beach, as they also sing about the region and its people. It was noted for being nostalgic, as its lyrics invoke images of both singers' hometown places. Their long-time friendship and love is also alluded through the lyrics of "La Bicicleta". Shakira mentions her boyfriend Gerard Piqué during her lines, saying that if he visits the Tayrona National Natural Park, he "wouldn't want to return to Barcelona" with the lyrics translating: "If you show my Piqué, Tayrona, then he won't want to go back to Barcelona". Vives, during his solo part sings about Shakira's most famous traits. Willy Varela Pupo of El Heraldo found similarities between "La Bicicleta" and Shakira's own collaboration with Spanish singer Alejandro Sanz, "La Tortura" (2005), due to the similar blend of Colombian and urban rhythms.

== Reception ==
=== Critical reception ===
Upon release, "La Bicicleta" was met with positive reviews from music critics. Writer Leila Cabo of Billboard deemed the song to be "catchy". Natalie Roterman from the Latin Times also called it "catchy and joyful". Ana Marcos of El País called "La Bicicleta" a candidate for song of the summer. She noted how it managed to return Colombian music to the forefront of the Latin genre, following the structural formula of songs by other contemporary Latin artists. Javier Soto of Univision noted how the opening lines, "Nada voy a hacer, rebuscando en las heridas del pasado", were sung with a lot of passion by Vives, and added that later on, the song managed to "perfectly combine" the elements of vallenato and reggaeton. A writer of El Tiempo opined that "La Bicicleta" showcased Vives's characteristic sound - a mixture of national Colombian music with urban beats. A Clarín writer felt that the name-dropping of Piqué was a promotional strategy to increase the song's sales.

Eliana Lopez from Variety Latino acknowledged how "La Bicicleta" was representative of both artists' styles and a fusion of musical styles combined "to perfection". She added that it was a "fresh and simple song, perfect to dance to for the summer". A writer of E! Online echoed her statements, writing that the song "promises to make the whole world dance". In another article for the same publication, called it "song of the summer" which acted as a soundtrack for parties, strolls and gyms at the right time of the year. Willy Varela Pupo of El Heraldo deemed the track a "historical collaboration". A Tiempo.com.mx writer who described "La Bicicleta" as amusing, felt that the duo not only showcased their singing talents in it, but their "beautiful friendship" as well. A more mixed review for the song came from Chuck Campbell from Knoxville News Sentinel who felt that Shakira and Vives didn't match and that the former was the more "dexterous" one in the song. At the 17th Annual Latin Grammy Awards held on 17 November 2016, "La Bicicleta" won in two main categories, namely, Record of the Year and Song of the Year. It also won in the categories for Single of the Year and Tropical Song of the Year at the Premio Lo Nuestro 2017.

Billboard included "La Bicicleta" among the 50 essential Latin songs of the 2010s decade.

=== Commercial performance ===
In the US, "La Bicicleta" appeared at No. 22 on the Bubbling Under Hot 100 Singles, a 25-song chart extension of the main Billboard Hot 100. The single managed to top the Latin Airplay chart for the week ending 18 June 2016 with 17 million audience impressions. "La Bicicleta" marked Vives's third number one debut, and Shakira's second; it was his twelfth overall No. 1 hit on the chart, making him the third male artist with most number-ones behind Ricky Martin and Enrique Iglesias and for Shakira it was the eleventh, tying her with Gloria Estefan. It also topped the Billboard Tropical Songs chart, while also appearing at Nos. 4 and 3 on the Hot Latin Songs and Latin Pop Songs charts respectively. It sold 7,000 downloads in its first week for the chart ending 2 June 2016, debuting on top of the Latin Digital Songs chart. During the week of its official music video release, "La Bicicleta" made a new peak on the Hot Latin Songs, moving to No. 2, with 2.2 million streams and 8,000 digital copies. Subsequently, it debuted at No. 95 on the Billboard Hot 100, becoming Vives's first entry on that chart and Shakira's eighteenth. "La Bicicleta" sold 110,000 digital copies according to the Billboard Latin Year-End Chart published in 2016 and another 48,000 copies in 2017.

In France, "La Bicicleta" debuted at the position of 168 on 4 June 2016 and later peaked at 30. In Spain, it debuted at No. 7 on the chart issue dated 5 June 2016. In its fourth week on the chart, on 26 June 2016, "La Bicicleta" moved to No. 5 in that country and later at No. 3 on 3 July. On 17 July 2016, the song topped the chart, where it reigned for 13 consecutive weeks. The Productores de Música de España (PROMUSICAE) certified the single five times platinum for sales of 200,000 copies in that country. It has become one of the best selling singles of Spain. In Italy the song debuted at No. 83 and peaked at 75, and in late November it was certified Platinum by FIMI for sales exceeding 50,000 copies.

== Music video ==
=== Background and release ===
A music video for the song was filmed on 19 May 2016 in both singers' hometowns - Shakira's Barranquilla, Colombia and Vives's Santa Marta. It was directed by Spanish director and photographer Jaume de Laiguana. Its cinematography was handled by Rafa Lluch. Some of the locations where it was filmed included Pescaíto and Shakira's college. The concept behind it was to follow the song's lyrics and allow Vives to take Shakira for a ride in the most important places where they grew up. The duo also wanted to show Colombian culture to its viewers, including "unforgettable places", beaches, football fields. Various images were uploaded by both artists on their respective Instagram accounts prior to the clip's release. Prior to its release, Vives and Shakira shared numerous images showing them riding bicycles and being surrounded by fans. During an interview with the Associated Press, Vives described the shooting as both fun and emotional for the singers as they felt like "kids again". He further elaborated,

"The work was intense but also delightful. Both for Shaki and for me, being back in our territory, plus the emotional load that this had for us, it was wonderful. We were really happy riding our bikes, singing on our bikes. We wanted to do everything barefoot. We strolled happily to several places... And watching Shaki contented, happy, reuniting with her friends, with her people, I think that the video registered a very, very special energy."

A lyric video for the song was uploaded on Vives's official Vevo account on 10 June 2016. It features images of various places in Colombia throughout, with vintage effects and postcard stamps of different places around the world. On 6 July 2016 Shakira shared a teaser clip of the music video for "La Bicicleta" on her Instagram account, revealing that it would be released two days later. The snippet featured her shaking her hips and Vives putting two bicycles on the back of a truck.

=== Synopsis ===
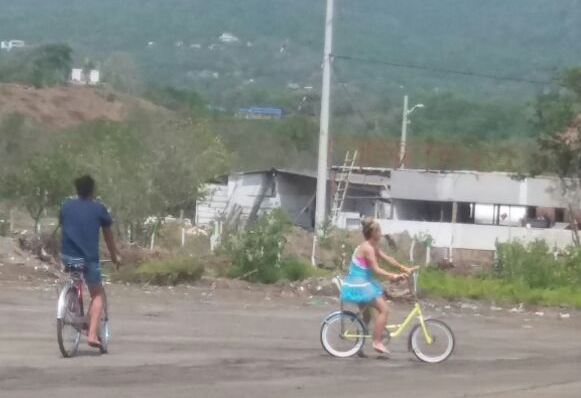
Vives and Shakira during the filming of the video in Puerto Velero.

The video for "La Bicicleta" premiered on Vives' Vevo account on 8 July 2016. It opens with shots of Vives leaning on a wall and Shakira in the middle of a group of people who shout out her name and clap their hands while she dances with her hips. It shows Shakira get stuck in traffic while traveling with a jeep and deciding to continue walking. Carlos Vives then appears offering her a bike to continue their Caribbean coast trip. During their stroll, they view various landscapes of Colombia, including the Pumarejo bridge, Shakira's college La Enseñanza and beaches where people are seen playing soccer. Shakira and Vives join them by wearing jerseys of teams Junior F.C. and Unión Magdalena respectively. Several scenes also show the duo engage in a "dance battle" where Shakira's dances include moving her hips. The clip also features fans of the singers and various scenery intertwined throughout. It ends with Shakira and Vives hugging each other.

=== Reception ===
Diana Marti, writing for E! Online noted how the clip would make viewers "fall in love" with Colombia and the beauty of its towns and beaches. Griselda Flores from Billboard was also positive of the beautiful landscapes and described the clip as "colorful and fun". Latina magazine's Nichole Fratangelo concluded how the duo looked like "feeling back at home with friends and fans" and noted "As if the two singers weren't lively enough, they're also seen sporting FC Barcelona soccer jerseys, in support of Shak's hubby Gerard Pique". She finished her review by advising readers to view the clip in order to catch a glimpse of "all the beauty and fun that is Colombia". A journalist of El Tiempo felt that Shakira stole everybody's attention with her "unforgettable hip movements". Suzette Fernández, writing for Telemundo deemed it a "beautiful stroll" across Colombia, its culture and people, with a "special touch" of Shakira's hip dances. A writer of E! Online described it as an "unforgettable" trip through Colombia, its landscapes and culture. Variety Latino's Eliana Lopez noted how the clip contained "a very trocipal and fresh vibe" much as the song itself. Mónica Quintero Restrepo of the newspaper El Colombiano, described the video as "agile and playful" and in the style of the two singers. A Colombia.com writer found various "spontaneous" scenes featured in it. A journalist from Musica Terra highlighted Shakira's "sexy" dancing in the video, which included the "explosive" hip movement. A. Marcos from El País noted how unlike Vives's previous video for "La Tierra del Olvido", which served as a touristic promotion for Colombia, the one for "La Bicicleta" was a more intimate video which showed how Colombians lived. He further noted how the duo used various football references to "agglutinate" its viewers. At the Premio Lo Nuestro 2017, the clip received the award for Video of the Year. As of July 2025, the video has received over 1.7 billion views on YouTube.

== Accolades ==
Year	Ceremony	Award	Result
2016	Latin Grammy Awards	Record of the Year	Won
2016	Latin Grammy Awards	Song of the Year	Won
2016	Kids' Choice Awards Colombia	Favorite Latin Song	Nominated
2016	LOS40 Music Awards	50th Anniversary Golden Music Award	Won
2016	LOS40 Music Awards	Los 40 Global Show Award	Nominated
2016	Shock Awards	Best Radio Song	Won
2017	Billboard Music Awards	Top Latin Song	Nominated
2017	Billboard Latin Music Awards	Hot Latin Song of the Year	Nominated
2017	Billboard Latin Music Awards	Vocal Event	Nominated
2017	Billboard Latin Music Awards	Airplay Song of the Year	Nominated
2017	Billboard Latin Music Awards	Digital Song of the Year	Nominated
2017	Billboard Latin Music Awards	Latin Pop Song of the Year	Nominated
2017	MTV Millennial Awards	Best Party Anthem	Nominated
2017	Premios Juventud	The Perfect Combination	Nominated
2017	Premios Juventud	Best Song For "Chillin"	Nominated
2017	Lo Nuestro Awards	Single of the Year	Won
2017	Lo Nuestro Awards	Video of the Year	Won
2017	Lo Nuestro Awards	Tropical Song of the Year	Won
2018	BMI Latin Awards	Winning song	Won

== Live performances and other versions ==
It was announced that Vives and Shakira would perform the song together at the American Music Awards of 2016 and the 17th Annual Latin Grammy Awards, however Shakira canceled both performances due to personal matters. Vives appeared the song alone on the latter award show taking place on 17 November 2016 in Paradise, Nevada backed by numerous dancers. He also gave another performance of "La Bicicleta" on the Argentinian TV show Susana Giménez in the month of November of the same year. This song would be included in both of Shakira's tours after its release.

Beto Perez, a Zumba dancer invented a workout with a dance choreography for the song, gathering more than 4,000 people in Argentina; his videos of the event were uploaded on Shakira's official YouTube channel.

Colombian singer Maluma posted a snippet of a remix version of "La Bicicleta" featuring his vocals on his Instagram account on 21 July 2016, which included him name-listing the singers. The entire remix version was uploaded on Vevo on 19 August 2016. It opens with new lyrics sang by Maluma, contains elements of urban dembow and lasts for a duration of 4:15. A writer of the magazine People en Español opined that Maluma added a "fresher imprint" to the song that made it more danceable than the original. The singer sang the remix version of "La Bicicleta" during his performance at the 2017 Viña del Mar International Song Festival on 24 February in Viña del Mar, Chile.

On 28 October 2023, Shakira surprised Vives and the audience in his concert at Kaseya Center while singing "La Bicicleta" by entering in the middle of the song without anyone knowing it and finishing the song, making it the very first time they performed the song together. After "La Bicicleta", Vives performed "Currambera", a tribute to Shakira made by Vives.

They performed the song together for the second time during the 13 April 2025 concert of Shakira’s Las Mujeres Ya No Lloran World Tour in Medellin.

== Credits and personnel ==
Credits and personnel adapted from El Dorado booklet.

Recording and management

- Mixed at Lula Recording (Jersey City, New Jersey)
- Mastered at Gateway Mastering Studios (Portland, Maine)
- MyMPM Music — administered by Sony/ATV Songs (BMI) — EMI Blackwood Music Inc., Write Bright Publishing (BMI) and Baluarte Music Publishing Inc. (ASCAP) — administered by Sony/ATV Discos Music Publishing LLC
- Carlos Vives appears courtesy of Sony Music Entertainment US Latin LLC

Personnel

- Carlos Vives – songwriting, vocals, production
- Shakira – songwriting, vocals, production
- Andrés Castro – songwriting, production, guitar, bass, keyboards, programming, vocals recording (Carlos Vives), recording engineering
- Luis Fernando Ochoa – production, guitar
- Christian Camilo Peña – accordion
- Tato Marenco – flauta de millo
- Alfredo Rosado – caja, guacharaca
- Afo Verde — executive producer
- Olgui Chirino – additional vocal arrangement
- Andre Nascimbeni – vocals recording (Shakira), recording engineering
- Luis Barrera Jr. – recording engineering
- Carlos Hernandez Carbonell – recording engineering
- Gustavo Celis – recording engineering
- Dave Claus – mixing
- Adam Ayan – mastering

== Charts ==
=== Weekly charts ===
Chart (2016–17)	Peak position
Argentina (Monitor Latino)	2
Argentina Digital Songs (CAPIF)	1
Belgium (Ultratip Bubbling Under Wallonia)	29
Chile (Monitor Latino)	1
Colombia (National-Report)	1
Dominican Republic (Monitor Latino)	19
Ecuador (Monitor Latino)	1
Ecuador (National-Report)	1
France (SNEP)	30
Guatemala (Monitor Latino)	1
Italy (FIMI)	75
Mexico (Mexico Airplay)	1
Panama (Monitor Latino)	9
Paraguay (Monitor Latino)	2
Portugal (AFP)	17
Romania Airplay (Media Forest)	1
Spain (Promusicae)	1
Switzerland (Schweizer Hitparade)	54
Uruguay (Monitor Latino)	1
US Billboard Hot 100	95
US Hot Latin Songs (Billboard)	2
US Latin Airplay (Billboard)	1
US Latin Pop Airplay (Billboard)	1
US Tropical Airplay (Billboard)	1
Venezuela (Monitor Latino)	1

=== Year-end charts ===
Chart (2016)	Position
Argentina (CAPIF)	2
Argentina (Monitor Latino)	4
Spain (PROMUSICAE)	3
US Hot Latin Songs (Billboard)	4
US Latin Airplay (Billboard)	3
Chart (2017)	Position
Argentina (Monitor Latino)	14
Chile (Monitor Latino)	19
Ecuador (Monitor Latino)	65
Guatemala (Monitor Latino)	20
Panama (Monitor Latino)	23
Paraguay (Monitor Latino)	31
Peru (Monitor Latino)	73
Spain (PROMUSICAE)	40
Uruguay (Monitor Latino)	9
US Hot Latin Songs (Billboard)	46
Chart (2018)	Position
Chile (Monitor Latino)	80

== Certifications ==
Region	Certification	Certified units/sales
Brazil (Pro-Música Brasil)	3× Platinum	180,000^{‡}
Canada (Music Canada)	Platinum	80,000^{‡}
France (SNEP)	Platinum	200,000^{‡}
Italy (FIMI)	Platinum	50,000^{‡}
Mexico (AMPROFON)	3× Diamond+2× Platinum+Gold	1,050,000^{‡}
Portugal (AFP)	Platinum	10,000^{‡}
Poland (ZPAV)	Gold	25,000^{‡}
Spain (Promusicae)	7× Platinum	280,000^{‡}
Switzerland (IFPI Switzerland)	Gold	15,000^{‡}
United States (RIAA)	43× Platinum (Latin)	2,580,000^{‡}
^{‡} Sales+streaming figures based on certification alone.

== See also ==
- List of number-one songs of 2016 (Mexico)
- List of number-one singles of 2016 (Spain)
- List of Billboard Hot Latin Songs and Latin Airplay number ones of 2016
- List of most-viewed YouTube videos
