= Perro Fiel =

Single by Shakira featuring Nicky Jam

from the album El Dorado
- Language: Spanish
- English title: "Faithful Dog"
- Released: 29 September 2017
- Recorded: 2016
- Genre: Pop; reggaeton
- Length: 3:16
- Label: Sony Latin
- Composers: Shakira; Nick Caminero; Cristhian Mena; Juan Medina
- Lyricists: Nick Caminero; Shakira
- Producers: Shakira; Nicky Jam; Saga WhiteBlack

Shakira singles chronology
"Me Enamoré" (2017)	"Perro Fiel" (2017)	"Trap" (2018)

Nicky Jam singles chronology
"Si Tú la Ves" (2017)	"Perro Fiel" (2017)	"Bella y Sensual" (2017)

Music video
- "Perro Fiel" on YouTube

"Perro Fiel" (English: "Faithful Dog") is a song by Colombian singer Shakira, featuring American singer Nicky Jam. It was written by Shakira, Nicky Jam, Saga WhiteBlack and Juan Medina, and produced by the former three. The song was released on 29 September 2017 as the third single from Shakira's eleventh studio album, El Dorado (2017).

Commercially, the single fared well, notably reaching number one in Argentina, Lebanon, Mexico and Paraguay. (Note: See #Charts)

== Background ==
The song was first recorded by American singer Nicky Jam on his own, recording the track as a demo for his album Fénix, though it was never fully executed for the album and was presented later to Shakira, who wrote new lyrics for the song and made it a part of her album. The original demo was leaked on the Internet in late 2016.

== Chart performance ==
As of September 2017, the song has moved almost 19,000 copies in the United States according to Nielsen SoundScan.

== Music video ==
The music video was filmed and directed by Jaume de Laiguana in late July 2017 in Barcelona and was released on 15 September 2017. Its cinematography was handled by Nono Arruga.

== Accolades ==
Year	Ceremony	Award	Result
2018	Latin American Music Awards	Favorite Song - Pop	Nominated

== Charts ==
=== Weekly charts ===
Chart (2017)	Peak position
Argentina (Monitor Latino)	1
Belgium (Ultratip Wallonia)	39
Bolivia (Monitor Latino)	3
Chile (Monitor Latino)	6
Colombia (National-Report)	21
Costa Rica (Monitor Latino)	4
Dominican Republic (Monitor Latino)	19
Ecuador (Monitor Latino)	8
Ecuador (National-Report)	6
El Salvador (Monitor Latino)	12
France (SNEP)	83
Guatemala (Monitor Latino)	4
Lebanon (The Official Lebanese Top 20)	1
Mexico (Billboard Mexican Airplay)	1
Nicaragua (Monitor Latino)	3
Panama (Monitor Latino)	7
Paraguay (Monitor Latino)	1
Peru (Monitor Latino)	2
Poland Airplay (ZPAV)	25
Poland Dance (ZPAV)	10
Portugal (AFP)	80
Spain (Promusicae)	3
Switzerland (Schweizer Hitparade)	62
Uruguay (Monitor Latino)	2
US Billboard Hot 100	100
US Hot Latin Songs (Billboard)	6
US Latin Airplay (Billboard)	1
US Latin Rhythm Airplay (Billboard)	1
Venezuela (National-Report)	23

=== Year-end charts ===
Chart (2017)	Position
Argentina (Monitor Latino)	66
Bolivia (Monitor Latino)	20
Chile (Monitor Latino)	45
El Salvador (Monitor Latino)	17
Guatemala (Monitor Latino)	34
Nicaragua (Monitor Latino)	5
Paraguay (Monitor Latino)	41
Peru (Monitor Latino)	93
Spain (PROMUSICAE)	45
Uruguay (Monitor Latino)	77
US Hot Latin Songs (Billboard)	49

Chart (2018)	Position
Argentina (Monitor Latino)	20
Spain (PROMUSICAE)	90
US Hot Latin Songs (Billboard)	27

== Certifications ==
Region	Certification	Certified units/sales
Brazil (Pro-Música Brasil)	2× Platinum	80,000^{‡}
Canada (Music Canada)	Gold	40,000^{‡}
Italy (FIMI)	Gold	25,000^{‡}
Mexico (AMPROFON)	Diamond+4× Platinum	540,000^{‡}
Spain (Promusicae)	3× Platinum	120,000^{‡}
Switzerland (IFPI Switzerland)	Gold	10,000^{‡}
^{‡} Sales+streaming figures based on certification alone.

== See also ==
- List of number-one songs of 2017 (Mexico)
- List of airplay number-one hits of the 2010s (Argentina)
- List of Billboard number-one Latin songs of 2017
- List of Billboard number-one Latin songs of 2018
