= Chantaje =

2016 single by Shakira featuring Maluma

Single by Shakira featuring Maluma

from the album El Dorado
- Language: Spanish
- Released: 28 October 2016
- Recorded: September 2016
- Genre: Pop; reggaeton
- Length: 3:16
- Label: Sony Latin
- Composers: Shakira; Maluma; Kenai; The Rudeboyz
- Lyricists: Kenai; Shakira; Maluma
- Producers: Shakira; Maluma; The Rudeboyz

Shakira singles chronology
"La Bicicleta" (2016)	"Chantaje" (2016)	"Deja Vu" (2017)

Maluma singles chronology
"Sim ou Não / Sí o No" (2016)	"Chantaje" (2016)	"Me Llamas (Remix)" (2016)

Music video
- "Chantaje" on YouTube

"Chantaje" (Spanish pronunciation: [tʃanˈtaxe]; English: "Blackmail") is a song by the Colombian singer-songwriter Shakira featuring Maluma. It was released on October 28, 2016, via Sony Music Latin, as the lead single from Shakira's eleventh album, El Dorado (2017). The song was written by Shakira and Maluma and produced by them and the Rudeboyz, with musical composition assistance from Kenai. The song is Maluma and Shakira's second collaboration after a remix of Carlos Vives' single "La Bicicleta".

"Chantaje" is a pop and reggaeton song. Lyrically, the song was considered a "battle of the sexes", where the male protagonist is not sure where he stands with his lover, and the female protagonist does not exactly clear things up. The music video for "Chantaje" was filmed in Barcelona, Spain, with video director Jaume de Laiguana, Shakira's long-time collaborator.

Commercially, the song topped the Brazil, Ecuador, Guatemala, Spain, Uruguay, and US Billboard Latin Songs charts, while also reaching the top five in nine additional countries. Maluma called it his "first global hit". It became the most successful Latin single of the decade by a female artist in the United States. The track is also certified Platinum or higher in ten countries, including Diamond in Argentina, Brazil (three times), Colombia, France, Mexico and United States (Latin). The song was nominated for Record of the Year, Song of the Year and Best Urban Fusion Performance at the 18th Latin Grammy Awards.

== Background and release ==
Puerto Rican composer and recording artist Kenai had the word "Chantaje" in his mind months before the idea of a collaboration with Shakira and Maluma emerged. He stated in an interview that the idea of the song was intended to be his own single. While working on music demos in Colombia with The Rudeboyz, he received a call from the production duo to work on a collaborative single between Shakira and Maluma that was intended to be presented to the artists the next day. They were supposed to offer three different demos to Shakira and Maluma, but ended up working on just one feeling confident enough about its potential. The three worked together on the demo one night in Colombia. The Rudeboyz traveled without Kenai the next day to Barcelona, Spain to meet with Shakira and Maluma to keep working on the song together.

Before collaborating with Shakira in "Chantaje", Maluma served guest vocals for the official remix of Carlos Vives and Shakira's 2016 song "La Bicicleta". Later, Maluma travelled to Barcelona in early September 2016 to work with Shakira, along with his production team. He confessed to Billboard that "he couldn't miss the opportunity to work with [her] again." The pairing was possible due to Sony Music Latin, who proposed the idea for both artists working together again after the remix of "La Bicicleta". Maluma also commented about Shakira, stating: "It was an amazing experience. [...] She's a great artist, but she's also a composer. I learned a lot."

Before releasing the song, Shakira shared clues on her Instagram account on 25 October 2016, and if someone solved the mystery, they would get a personal message from the singer confirming the correct answer. The first photo had Shakira "wearing a magician's hat and holding a rabbit," which meant "Magic", name of both Shakira's and Maluma's first albums; the second photo had a drawing of a crown in a white board, meaning Maluma's crown tattoo; and the third photo was Shakira holding a poster with a photo of Alejandro Sanz (which stands for his nickname "Chan") + TA + G, which was the title of the track: "Chantaje", literally "blackmail." Later, the singer shared the artwork of the single, featuring both artists. Eventually, the song was released on 28 October 2016 through digital download by Ace Entertainment.

== Composition ==
"Chantaje" was written by Shakira, Maluma, Kenai and production duo The Rudeboyz. It was also produced by Shakira and Maluma with The Rudeboyz. "Chantaje" is a pop and reggaeton song, with tropical synths in its background. The song is built from a "pitched-up vocal" saying "Hola, mira" ("Hello, look"). Lyrically, the song is a chase "between a lustful man and an unattainable woman," where "he’s not sure where he stands with her, and she's not exactly clearing things up." "Yo soy masoquista" ("I'm a masochist"), he says, and she responds, "Con mi cuerpo, un egoísta" ("With my body, [you're] a selfish [man]"); later, she reassures him: "Te dicen [...] que en esta relación, soy yo la que manda [...] esa mala propaganda" ("They say that... in this relationship, I’m in command... that's just evil propaganda"). In the chorus, to the contrary, she asserts: "No soy de ti ni de nadie" ("I'm not yours or anyone else's").

== Critical reception ==
Jon Pareles of The New York Times was positive, noting that "Shakira gets even more intense when she sings in Spanish, nervier and more committed," and calling the song "a sparse, insinuatingly catchy reggaetón battle of the sexes." Jeff Nelson of People named it "a sexy, buoyant jam," while Diana Martin of E! Online wrote that the song is "all sorts of sexy and infectious." Lucy Morris of Digital Spy admitted: "We may have no clue what the lyrics mean, but the song is infectious." Mike Wass of Idolator opined that the song "is instantly hummable regardless of your Spanish language skills and will have you moving before the end of the first verse. It’s a winner and has the potential to be a 'La Tortura'-sized crossover hit." Lucas Villa of AXS said that the song "plays to Shakira's strengths as a global seductress with a banger that's ready to make club-goers bend to its will."

Billboard included Chantaje among the 50 essential Latin songs of the 2010s decade.

== Commercial performance ==
In the United States, the song became the second track to ever debut atop Billboard Top Latin Songs after Shakira's and Maná's "Mi Verdad", after the chart became a multi-metric chart. With its first-week sales of 13,000 digital downloads, 1.6 million streams and 13.8 million audience impressions in the US, the song became the second highest sales week for a Spanish-language track in 2016. The single was "only the 14th track to debut atop the chart in its 30-year history"Chantaje", as reported by Billboard. It is also Shakira's eleventh number-one on the chart, and Maluma's first. "Chantaje" also debuted at number 96 on the Billboard Hot 100 chart, becoming Shakira's 19th entry there and Maluma's first. In its eighth charting week, the song managed to jump from number 65 to number 51, becoming her highest Hot 100 Spanish-language single after "La Tortura" (2005). In the same week, the song spent its eighth non-consecutive week at the top of the Latin Songs, matching the amount of time that "Hips Don't Lie" spent in 2006, while also becoming her second longest chart reign, spending eleven weeks at number one. It has been certified 16× Platinum by the RIAA's Latin certifications program, denoting sales of over 960,000 units. According to the 2017 year-end Nielsen Canada report, the song has sold 177,000 units in the country. "Chantaje" went on to become the most successful Latin single of the decade by a female artist in the United States, according to Billboard.

In the United Kingdom, the single became the first Spanish song by a female artist in history to be certified Silver for surpassing 200,000 equivalent units in the country.

In France, the song debuted at number 36 on the week of 11 November 2016. Later, it fell to numbers 91 and 126 in the following weeks, before climbing once again to number 76. After spending three weeks climbing on the charts, "Chantaje" cracked the top-forty for the second time, going to number forty. Five weeks later, the song managed to climb from number 22 to number 14, becoming Shakira's fifteenth top-twenty single and highest since "Dare (La La La)" (2014).

In Italy, "Chantaje" debuted at number 15 and peaked at number 11 for two weeks.

In Netherlands, "Chantaje" managed to peak at number 18, becoming her highest-charting single since "Waka Waka (This Time for Africa)" (2010).

In Switzerland, the song peaked at number 10, becoming Shakira's fifteenth top-ten single.

In Spain, "Chantaje" entered the PROMUSICAE chart at number eight and reached number-one the following week, becoming Shakira's eighth number-one single.

== Music video ==
The music video was shot in Barcelona, on 13 and 14 October 2016, and it was directed by Spanish director and photographer Jaume de Laiguana, who has already directed various Shakira's music videos. Cinematography was handled by Spanish cinematographer Xavi Giménez. The official lyric video to the song was released on 16 November, while the official music video was released on 18 November 2016. In the beginning of the music video, as described by Rolling Stone's Sarah Grant, "Shakira strolls through a bodega with her pet pig on a leash and her wild mane of hair hidden under a pink wig." "She then lures him in to an underground bar", as Billboard added, while also "swivel[ing] her hips from the top of the bar to the men's bathroom, where she winds, kicks and grinds solo amid the urinals."

=== Reception ===
The music video earned 100 million views in just 19 days, breaking the previous 21 days record, and becoming the fastest Spanish video ever to do so. On 7 April 2017, it reached 1 billion views, becoming the fastest Spanish video to hit the billion visits landmark. It was also the second-most viewed video on Vevo in 2017, after "Despacito".

=== Salsa version ===
On 2 February, Shakira celebrated her birthday with a salsa version of "Chantaje" with Chelito de Castro.

== Accolades ==
Year	Ceremony	Award	Result
2017	Billboard Music Awards	Top Latin Song	Nominated
2017	Latin American Music Awards	Favorite Song Pop/Rock	Nominated
2017	Latin American Music Awards	Favorite Collaboration	Nominated
2017	Latin American Music Awards	Song of the Year	Nominated
2017	Latin Grammy Awards	Record of the Year	Nominated
2017	Latin Grammy Awards	Song of the Year	Nominated
2017	Latin Grammy Awards	Best Urban Fusion/Performance	Nominated
2017	MTV Millennial Awards	Collaboration of the Year	Nominated
2017	Premios Juventud	Best Song For Dancing	Nominated
2017	Premios Juventud	The Perfect Combination	Nominated
2017	Teen Choice Awards	Choice Latin Song	Nominated
2018	Billboard Latin Music Awards	Hot Latin Song of the Year, Vocal Event	Nominated
2018	Billboard Latin Music Awards	Streaming Song of the Year	Nominated
2018	Billboard Latin Music Awards	Digital Song of the Year	Nominated
2018	Billboard Latin Music Awards	Latin Pop Song of the Year	Nominated
2018	BMI Latin Awards	Winning Song	Won
2018	MTV Video Music Awards	Best Latin	Nominated

== Live performances ==
Maluma performed the song in Valparaíso at the Viña del Mar International Song Festival in February 2017, then on his various tours since, where he typically has a female vocalist stand-in for Shakira's vocals.

Shakira performed "Chantaje" with Coldplay's lead vocalist Chris Martin at the Global Citizen Festival in Hamburg in July 2017. She tried to get him to sing and understand the Spanish words. Shakira subsequently performed the song, solo, during her El Dorado World Tour in 2018.

Shakira performed a shortened, Salsa-inspired version of the song with Bad Bunny during her medley of songs at the Super Bowl LIV halftime show in 2020.

On 12 April 2025, Shakira and Maluma performed the song together for the very first time during Shakira’s Las Mujeres Ya No Lloran World Tour in Medellin.

== Credits and personnel ==
Credits adapted from Tidal.

- Shakira – lead vocals, composer, producer
- Maluma – lead vocals, composer, producer
- Joel Antonio López Castro "Kenai" – composer
- Kevin Mauricio Jiménez Londoño "Kevin ADG" (The RudeBoyz) – composer, producer
- Bryan Snaider Lezcano Chaverra "Chan 'El Genio'" (The RudeBoyz) – composer, producer
- Dave Clauss – mixing engineer
- Adam Ayan – mastering engineer

== Charts ==
=== Weekly charts ===
Chart (2016–17)	Peak position
Argentina (Monitor Latino)	4
Argentina Digital Songs (CAPIF)	1
Austria (Ö3 Austria Top 40)	41
Belgium (Ultratop 50 Flanders)	11
Belgium (Ultratop 50 Wallonia)	19
Bulgaria Airplay (BAMP)	3
Brazil (Hot 100 Airplay)	1
Canada Hot 100 (Billboard)	50
Colombia (National-Report)	2
Czech Republic Singles Digital (ČNS IFPI)	35
Dominican Republic (Monitor Latino)	10
Ecuador (National-Report)	1
Finland Download (Latauslista)	23
France (SNEP)	13
Germany (GfK)	20
Guatemala (Monitor Latino)	1
Hungary (Single Top 40)	29
Israel International Airplay (Media Forest)	8
Ireland (IRMA)	91
Italy (FIMI)	11
Mexico (Billboard Mexican Airplay)	3
Netherlands (Dutch Top 40)	25
Netherlands (Single Top 100)	18
Panama (Monitor Latino)	3
Paraguay (Monitor Latino)	2
Portugal (AFP)	3
Romania (Media Forest)	2
Slovakia Singles Digital (ČNS IFPI)	11
Slovenia (SloTop50)	26
Spain (Promusicae)	1
Sweden (Sverigetopplistan)	54
Switzerland (Schweizer Hitparade)	10
Uruguay (Monitor Latino)	1
US Billboard Hot 100	51
US Hot Latin Songs (Billboard)	1
US Latin Airplay (Billboard)	1
US Latin Rhythm Airplay (Billboard)	1
Venezuela (National-Report)	2

Chart (2020)	Peak position
US Billboard Latin Digital Songs Sales	8

Chart (2026)	Peak position
Greece International (IFPI)	95

=== Year-end charts ===
Chart (2016)	Position
Spain (PROMUSICAE)	77
Chart (2017)	Position
Argentina (Monitor Latino)	13
Belgium (Ultratop Flanders)	60
Belgium (Ultratop Wallonia)	77
Bolivia (Monitor Latino)	24
Brazil (Pro-Música Brasil)	57
Chile (Monitor Latino)	9
Ecuador (Monitor Latino)	41
France (SNEP)	39
Germany (Official German Charts)	100
Guatemala (Monitor Latino)	7
Israel (Media Forest)	10
Italy (FIMI)	39
Netherlands (Single Top 100)	100
Panama (Monitor Latino)	6
Paraguay (Monitor Latino)	13
Peru (Monitor Latino)	33
Portugal (AFP)	25
Romania (Airplay 100)	16
Spain (PROMUSICAE)	11
Switzerland (Schweizer Hitparade)	26
Uruguay (Monitor Latino)	3
US Hot Latin Songs (Billboard)	3
US Latin Pop Songs (Billboard)	11

=== Decade charts ===
Chart (Dec. 2009–19)	Peak position
US Hot Latin Songs (Billboard)	18

=== All-time charts ===
Chart (2021)	Position
US Hot Latin Songs (Billboard)	48

== Certifications ==
Region	Certification	Certified units/sales
Argentina (CAPIF)	Diamond	250,000
Belgium (BRMA)	Platinum	20,000^{‡}
Brazil (Pro-Música Brasil)	3× Diamond	750,000^{‡}
Canada (Music Canada)	2× Platinum	177,000
Colombia	Diamond	
Denmark (IFPI Danmark)	Gold	45,000^{‡}
France (SNEP)	Diamond	233,333^{‡}
Germany (BVMI)	Platinum	400,000^{‡}
Greece (IFPI Greece)	Platinum	
Italy (FIMI)	3× Platinum	150,000^{‡}
Mexico (AMPROFON)	3× Diamond	900,000^{‡}
Norway (IFPI Norway)	Platinum	60,000^{‡}
New Zealand (RMNZ)	Gold	15,000^{‡}
Poland (ZPAV)	2× Platinum	100,000^{‡}
Portugal (AFP)	Platinum	10,000^{‡}
Spain (Promusicae)	5× Platinum	200,000^{‡}
Sweden (GLF)	Platinum	40,000^{‡}
Switzerland (IFPI Switzerland)	Platinum	30,000^{‡}
United Kingdom (BPI)	Gold	400,000^{‡}
United States (RIAA)	16× Platinum (Latin)	960,000^{‡}
Streaming
Chile (PROFOVI)	2× Platinum	16,000,000
Greece (IFPI Greece)	Platinum	2,000,000^{†}
^{‡} Sales+streaming figures based on certification alone.^{†} Streaming-only figures based on certification alone.

== Release history ==
Region	Date	Format	Label	Ref.
United States	28 October 2016	Digital download	Ace Entertainment	
Italy	28 October 2016	Contemporary hit radio	Sony Music	

== See also ==
- List of number-one singles of 2016 (Spain)
- List of number-one singles of 2017 (Spain)
- List of number-one Billboard Hot Latin Songs of 2016
- List of number-one Billboard Hot Latin Songs of 2017
- List of most liked YouTube videos
- List of best-selling singles in Spain
