= El Dorado World Tour =

2018 concert tour by Shakira

- Tour by Shakira
- Location: Asia; Europe; North America; South America
- Associated album: El Dorado
- Start date: 3 June 2018
- End date: 3 November 2018
- No. of shows: 54
- Box office: $75 million (estimation)

Shakira concert chronology
- The Sun Comes Out World Tour (2010–2011); El Dorado World Tour (2018); Las Mujeres Ya No Lloran World Tour (2025-2026)

The El Dorado World Tour was the sixth world tour by Colombian singer Shakira, in support of her eleventh studio album, El Dorado. Comprising a total of 54 shows, It was her first tour in seven years, the last being The Sun Comes Out World Tour. The tour began on 3 June 2018, in Hamburg, Germany and ended on 3 November 2018 in Bogotá, Colombia. The tour was set to begin in November 2017, but due to a hemorrhage at Shakira's right vocal cord acquired at her last round of rehearsals, the entire tour was postponed to start mid-2018.

== Background ==
After an anticipation tweet from Shakira's official account featuring the flags of 18 countries and a link to a newsletter subscription to her music label, the tour was announced three days later, on 27 June 2017, primarily sponsored by Rakuten. Also teaming on the tour were Live Nation Entertainment's Global Touring Division (that had previously collaborated with Shakira on her The Sun Comes Out World Tour) and Citi, which were, respectively, the producer and the credit card for the North American leg of the tour. As part of the tour introduction, Live Nation posted a video via their official social networks as a further reminder.

The tour was planned to begin on 8 November, in Cologne, Germany, but due to vocal strain during her tour rehearsals, the date was cancelled one day prior to the original tour schedule. On 9 November she announced the postponement of the dates for both shows in Paris, as well as the ones in Antwerp and Amsterdam. On 14 November, she announced through her social networks that she had acquired a haemorrhage on her right vocal chord at the end of October during her last batch of rehearsals, and needed to rest her voice to be cured; so all the European legs were postponed until 2018. On 27 December 2017, she also announced the postponement of all North American dates, and the rescheduling of all announced dates so far; the tour officially started in June 2018.

Shakira in New York City's Madison Square Garden, where she sold out the venue for the 5th time and became the first Latin artist to gross over 2 million US dollars from a US arena.

On 22 January 2018, she announced three additional European dates for the cities of Hamburg, London and Bordeaux. A second Los Angeles show was added on 9 May; and, a day after, Shakira announced a date for Istanbul, 11 years after visiting Turkey with her Oral Fixation Tour, as well as the Latin American dates. After these, it was announced that the Colombian singer would visit Lebanon, to perform at the Cedars International Festival. Although some Israeli media had reported a concert would be held on 9 July 2018 in Tel Aviv, which caused some negative reactions, and a threat of boycotting her Lebanese concert, supported by BDS, Live Nation confirmed through their Twitter account that no date had been set for Israel.

On 29 June 2018, it was confirmed by the mayor of Shakira's hometown Barranquilla, Alejandro Char, that the native singer would perform at the inauguration of 2018 edition of the Central American and Caribbean Games, to be held in the Colombian city. For this special event, Shakira performed 3 songs ("Me Enamoré," "Hips Don't Lie," and "La Bicicleta") in the Estadio Metropolitano Roberto Meléndez on 19 July.

== Development ==
Preparations for the tour as originally scheduled started in late August 2017, with rehearsals taking place in Barcelona, as revealed by the singer herself. Shakira posted through her social networks a series of videos documenting the creative process of the tour from its earliest stages. Among the first videos was one where she introduced part of her crew, and one posted a day later showed her working out. As rehearsals continued during October, more videos from backstage and rehearsals came out. One of the videos most commented on by the press was one posted by Shakira's partner, Gerard Piqué, of him attending her performance of her 1997 single, "Antología". After the tour hiatus for the singer's recovery, rehearsals resumed on 9 May 2018, and Shakira continued documenting her tour preparation through her social networks.

As part of her interaction with fans during the original tour preparation and anticipation, on 7 August 2017 Shakira urged her followers through her social networks to collaborate in the selection of the songs that would be featured on tour, expressing a desire for "this tour to be particularly special for her fans". In this way, Viber, a subsidiary of official tour sponsor Rakuten, carried out a poll to help her pick out some tracks. The winning choices were announced a week later on the mobile platform. Seconding this research, Shakira joined Viber again to promise a surprise contest for fans, on 10 October, that was announced two days later, on the same instant messenger application. One of the prizes was a trip to Barcelona to attend rehearsals. Rakuten Spain delivered a similar prize contest (valid only for Spanish residents), in which the winners were able to watch a private show by Shakira's team also in Barcelona, on 4 November, a few days before the tour was to have kicked off originally. As for 2018 resuming rehearsals, the official Spanish tour sponsor kept on posting anticipation notes through their social networks, and the partnership with Viber for exclusive content from tour was kept too.

Crew members were announced by Shakira little by little, one of the first ones being Anna Kaiser, her personal trainer, through videos and photos of the singer's AKT InMotion workout sessions. On 30 October 2017, Shakira herself revealed band members, including her longtime fellow musicians guitarist Tim Mitchell, keyboard player Albert Menendez and drummer Brendan Buckley. Besides them, there were, debuting on a Shakira tour, bass player Erik Kertes and violinist Caitlin Evanson. As for the actual tour start in mid-2018, all band members remained the same except bassist Joe Ayoub who joined to replace Kertes. Production design company Vita Motus was commissioned for stage design, and Syndrome Studio was in charge as the graphic design for screen backdrops. Longtime Shakira contributor Marjan Malakpour was the executive stylist for tour, and among those in charge of designing costumes for tour were French fashion house Balmain, American fashion designer Brian Lichtenberg, and fellow Colombian fashion designer Juan Carlos Obando. For most of the Spanish concerts, she wore a belt with feathers designed by Hawaiian-based online clothing store Iheartpolynesia, adapted from the same type of piece this shop had previously designed for Miss Latina Hawaii 2018.

== Commercial performance ==
=== Ticket sales ===
Tickets for first 33 announced dates went on sale on 30 June 2017, two days after a Viber presale valid for just one day. Live Nation and Citi also offered presales after rescheduling, although the presale by Citi was valid only for performances within United States. Shakira also teamed up with Ticketmaster to sell tickets. Ticket prices ranged from US$40 to over 2000 USD for both European and North American dates. second dates were added to cities such as Paris, Barcelona, Miami, Los Angeles, and Mexico City. The pre-sale tickets for the show in Ecuador grossed over $500,000 in its first 6 hours, and the show was almost sold out on the first day. Ticket News reported that the show in Capital One Arena took the best-seller spot on Thursday, July 5.

=== Accolades ===
A second date was added due to overwhelming demand, making Shakira the first female artist in history to add a second consecutive date in this stadium. In Ecuador, she broke the record previously held by Bruno Mars, of having sold the most tickets during a pre-sale period. She is also the first artist to perform in Rosario's Estadio Gigante de Arroyito. Based on the Live Music annual report published by the Spanish Musical Promoters Association (APM), all five performances in Spain had over 71,000 attendees. In New York City, she is the second Latin artist to gross over 2 million in one night in American concert history after Romeo Santos's Yankee Stadium show in 2014. In Miami and Los Angeles, she is the only female artist to have two shows in both American Airlines Arena and The Forum in 2018. The two shows in Miami extended her record of having the most concerts in American Airlines Arena, 9 shows since Tour of the Mongoose, more than any artist. According to Billboard, the two sold out nights in Miami were the venue's biggest in 2018 with almost 3 million dollars.

=== Revenue ===
Pollstar initially estimated that the tour grossed around $75 million over 52 shows. Based on their 2018 year-end report the tour grossed $40.7 million worldwide in 28 shows, with an average of $1.6 million per show. Billboard reported that the North American leg of tour grossed $28.2 million. The revenue for her Bsharri, Lebanon, concert totaled $2 million according to some Middle East media. The organizers of the Ecuador show reported that the quick sale of presale tickets grossed over $500,000 in only 6 hours.

== Concert synopsis ==
The show starts by a flash of light appearing on the big screen, as Shakira's voice can be heard repeating "estoy aquí" (Spanish, "I am here"); at the same time, on the side round screens, a series of black and white pictures of hers is displayed in chronological order to showcase an infant Shakira growing up and becoming the superstar she is now. Once the slideshow is over, a victorious and smiling Shakira runs on stage waving at fans (with a firework rain at the back of the stadiums for the Latin American dates), opening the setlist with an EDM medley of her 1995 breakthrough hits "Estoy Aquí" and "¿Dónde Estás Corazón?." She plays a synth keyboard in between the songs and a confetti shower explodes once the second song of medley is played. The costumes of this act are designed by Balmain, Brian Lichtenberg, and Black Majesty. After the "memorabilia medley," an intermission comes: Shakira is seen sitting on a rock chair with chains around her; the entertainer starts dancing, chest pumping and hair whipping, to finally succeed in breaking the chains, and her 2009 hit "She Wolf" begins. After its second chorus, she plays again the synth keyboard and walks through the catwalk right to the B-stage, asking to the women in the crowd to howl à la "She-wolf style." The concert continues with a rockified version of her 2000 hit "Si Te Vas" (a traditional feature for most of her stage tours), what is followed by two recent El Dorado singles: "Nada" and "Perro Fiel;" the latter as a mash-up with another Nicky Jam's single, "El Perdón." The two artists (him on background) sing both songs of mash-up, and pyrotechnique effects appear throughout this number. In sequence, she introduces her band, and they play a R&B version of her English-speaking 2002 tune "Underneath Your Clothes." A slightly edited version of "Me Enamoré" comes after. Then, the Latin songwriter takes an electric guitar to play her 1998 rock hit "Inevitable." The act ends with 2016 megahit "Chantaje," where Maluma appears for a moment in the central screen.

With the first costume change, an "Interlude of the Gods" is presented, recreating in animation the story of the creation of universe according to the Pre-Columbian Andean traditions (specifically from the mythology of the Muisca civilization, who populated part of what is nowadays Colombian territory - this is the same people from whom arose the El Dorado legend), being narrated by an indigenous child, as excerpts of her 2008 single "Despedida" are heard. The little child finishes its tale with the story of the birth of the Mother Goddess, Bachué, who was in charge to populate the Earth. Shakira, as in a Bachué embodiment, returns to stage wearing a golden belly dancing attire with her back to the crowd and a mask on the back of her head; all costume pieces are designed by Laurel Dewitt. Right after this dance personification, she executes her signature belly dancing and sings the Sahara Mix of her 2001 smash hit "Whenever, Wherever" (that previously served as the encore act for her Tour of the Mongoose); in the halfway, one more belly dance break is done, this in a very similar way of the one happened during "Ojos Así" at her immediately previous tour.

Seconding this one-song act, an "Underwater interlude" is shown as a backdrop consisting of outtake scenes of Shakira's underwater videos shot for "Trap" music clip, along with her disserting about the meaning of life. The third act comes out when Cuban percussionist Albert Menéndez, a longtime contributor of her band, plays a piano, and Shakira is spotted at a corner of stage singing her 1998 ballad "Tú" (in its most known MTV Unplugged live incarnation, but missing second verse and chorus), whilst dressed up with black outfits designed by fashion houses Agent Provocateur and Koral, along with chain bracelets by Elena Staun and a long avantgarde jacket by Israeli fashionist Liona Taragan. Following this up, "Amarillo" comes, with her playing a drawing-decorated acoustic guitar. When she sings the chorus of the song, colors start displaying in the background. She said the visuals for this act were inspired by the work of Dutch photographer Anton Corbijn, from whose she's a big fan. The guitar is raised at the end of song, revealing a picture of her partner, the Spanish football player Gerard Piqué, along with their 2 sons, Milan and Sasha. She takes off the Taragan jacket soon as her smash hit duet with Alejandro Sanz, "La Tortura," starts. Both Sanz (in-off) and Menéndez do the male lyrics. Soon, Shakira brings most part of her band to the B-stage to join her to perform altogether an early tune of hers, "Antología," in a reminder of the same song rendition at selected dates of the Oral Fixation Tour. When it is over, the band returns to their original places, while she has a short talk to her drummer Brendan Buckley, that leads to 2014 hit "Can't Remember to Forget You," in a new reggae arrangement. Towards its final, the song turns into a heavier rock version as Shakira plays frenzily the drums, in company of Rihanna singing part of chorus on the sidescreens. This section ends thereafter with a merengue medley of two Sale El Sol hits, "Loca" and "Rabiosa."

As Shakira leaves the stage, an instrumental-only violin version interlude of her 2016 comeback hit, "La Bicicleta," is played by band member Caitlin Evanson, while the other musicians play characteristic samples of Queen's worldwide hit "We Will Rock You." Four big drums are put in the front of main stage (one for each musician except the bassist), and Shakira goes back, wearing a red and yellow (signing colors shared by the flags of Colombia and Spain, besides Catalonia) ostrich skirt, designed by Hawaiian clothing line Iheartpolynesia, to dance and sing a medley of her World Cup hits "La La La (Brazil 2014)" (2014) and "Waka Waka" (2010).

For the encore, there is an "Education Interlude:" a short movie to raise awareness for children who are deprived of any kind of education, portraiting the daily fight of kids around the world in the most underprivileged areas putting maximum efforts to receive education. As it ends, Shakira arrives to a small round stage located in the middle of the crowd in a gold dress and sings a shortened version of "Toneladas" (being this song removed on both Istanbul and Bsharri nights - same happened to "Antología"); after that, she removes her golden dress to reveal a pink Colombian dress (being both outfits designed by Barranquilla-born stylist Juan Carlos Obando), and runs through the crowd greeting and hugging her fans, returning to the main stage to perform her 2006 Billboard Hot 100 chart topper "Hips Don't Lie;" closing the concert, she tells the audience about her hometown roots and does an a cappella snippet of "La Bicicleta," which is succeeded by a full-length, full band accompanied version of the duet with fellow Colombian Carlos Vives, who has also his presence on the circular screens. As Shakira says goodbye to the audience, colorful confetti showers explode as an extra thanks to fans (firework shows were added for this part during the Latin American concerts too).

== Critical reception ==
=== Eurasia ===
The tour received general to universal acclaim. Reviewing the London show The Times gave the show a five star out of five rating, describing Shakira as "raunchy rock chick, a fiery temptress." The Guardian gave the tour a four out of five star review, complimenting Shakira's ability to fill arenas after 3 decades by pleasing her Latin fans and not leaving behind her massive English hits saying "she-wolf still has sharp teeth." Sonia De la Forterie from French radio station NRJ called the atmosphere of the shows in Paris a "boiling arena," highlighting Shakira's rendition of "Je l'aime à mourir." Florian Koch from Abendzeitung gave the show in Munich also a five star out of five, highlighting Shakira's emotional state after the recovery, and highlighting "Whenever, Wherever" by calling it "seductive." The Spanish/Galician newspaper La Opinión A Coruña acclaimed the show in A Coruña, praising Shakira's vocals, "messages of solidarity," and her "electric dance moves," acclaiming the entirety of the show by saying "The Colombian star fills the Coliseum with a vibrant show." The concert in the Cedars of Lebanon was met with critical acclaim by Isra Hassan from Lebanese newspaper An-Nahar; in her review of the tour stop at the Lebanese World Heritage Site, she called it a once in a lifetime experience, besides calling Shakira "Queen of stage" and stating that few deserve the title "global superstar" and Shakira is one of them.

=== North America ===
Suzy Exposito from Rolling Stone reviewed the New York show saying "she asserted her rank as an international pop goddess," further complimenting Shakira for filling up the stage alone with no backup dancers, and asserting herself as a rock chick when playing the guitar and drums. Reviewing the Los Angeles show, Mike Wass from Idolator said "The end result is an intoxicating, electric live experience that feels both intimate and epic. From the opening number to her final bow, the Colombian superstar had last night [August 28]'s sold-out crowd completely under her spell." to later acclaim the artist by saying "Long may her reign as the Queen of Latin pop continue." A further Los Angeles Times review acclaimed the same concert for having "the feel of a hero's return." The Anaheim show was acclaimed by Lucas Villa from AXS.com complementing Shakira for putting on a show without relying on huge production to amaze a crowd writing, "instead of relying on a big production, she used her best instrument, her body, to capture the audience and shine as the gold standard of a performer." They add by saying that the show reaffirms Shakira's status as a "global icon." The Washington Post praised Shakira for her ability to gain back her voice after the vocal injury acclaiming the show by stating "Shakira launches ‘El Dorado’ with real and vocal fireworks" they further acclaimed her three decade spanning and diverse catalog, her signature vibrato, and massive pyrotechnics. Natalie Weiner from The New York Times called the show "The return of a titan of Latin pop, a dance festival" giving Shakira the title "Titan of Latin Pop" for her crossover that stands out among all other Latin crossover artists. Reviewing the show in Phoenix, Anthony Sandoval from azcentral called Shakira's 2018 rendition of her 2001 hit "Whenever, Wherever" a "cinematic sequence," complimenting her signature belly dance and the concept of the mask, therefore acclaiming the show, calling it "a performance that was endearing, fierce and downright majestic." Lilia O'Hara from The San Diego Union-Tribune described the connection between Shakira and her fans by "great maturity", and later praised the artist for being "one of the most versatile" songwriters in Latin music, also applauding Shakira for her dancing, singing and her ability to play multiple instruments.

=== Latin America ===
Sebastián Peña from the Colombian blog Shock called the Mexico City shows "the return of living and golden legend of music." EFE also commented on the show in Mexico describing Shakira as "authentic owner of the stage" for filling the stage alone without the need of backup dancers also calling the night "magical". João Pinheiro from the Brazilian blog Tenho Mais Discos que Amigos! acclaimed the show in São Paulo calling it "rapturous," wowing the 45,000 attendees, highlighting the "She Wolf" performance calling it "hypnotizing" and "theatrical" and praising her ability to dance and sing "perfectly" at the same time. Notife.com (a digital news page in Santa Fe, Argentina) said Shakira "captivated" the crowd of 40,000 during the Rosario step with her "eccentric voice" and "frantic dance steps". The Ecuadorian newspaper El Comercio reported that the show in Guayaquil had "stunning sound, lights, and fires," later highlighting the "Antología" performance describing it as "intimate" with the entire stadium singing along with her. When reviewing the last concert of tour in Bogotá, Sebastián Peña from El Espectador named her trek "the golden return of Shakira", also asserting that Shakira is the only Latin artist to fill stadiums along with legends like Michael Jackson, Paul McCartney, and U2.

== Philanthropy on tour ==
Shakira, as a UNICEF goodwill ambassador and an advocate for free and quality education, invited this organization to be present during the tour to collect donations from fans. UNICEF was on the road with Shakira throughout the tour. The tour also included an interlude before the encore called the "education interlude" to raise awareness for the difficulty of receiving basic education in the world's most remote areas that are conquered by poverty and inequality. During her visit to Montreal, staff from LCI Education Network of LaSalle College met with Shakira to announce their collaboration with Shakira's Barefoot Foundation in the "Institución Educativa Fundación Pies Descalzos El Bosque project". Shakira asked fans to donate $10 to One Drop Foundation for a chance to meet her in Las Vegas. Before the tour's last stop in Bogotá, Shakira had a quick visit to her hometown Barranquilla to set the first stone for 2 new schools by her foundation one in Barranquilla, and another one in Cartagena. Billboard reports the costs of the schools being over $4 million each.

== Honors and awards ==
=== Honors ===
- On 13 July, during her visit to Lebanon, a ceremony was held for Shakira in the Cedars reserve of Tannourine where her paternal grandmother was born. During the ceremony a square was named "Shakira Isabel Mebarak" after the singer, and two cedar trees were planted in honor of her and her father.
- During the visit to Buenos Aires in Argentina, Shakira was declared as "Guest of Honor" to the city by the town's legislator.

=== Awards and nominations ===
Year	Category	Award ceremony	Result	Ref.
2018	Tour of the Year	LOS40 Music Awards	Nominated	
2019	Best Latin Tour	30th Annual Pollstar Awards	Won	
2019	Tour of the Year	Premio Lo Nuestro	Nominated	
2019	Tour of the Year	Latin Billboard Music Awards	Nominated	

== Incidents ==
- The concert in Istanbul's Vodafone Park stadium caused the grass of the stadium to be seriously damaged from overcrowding of fans, and the management had to repair the grass. The same incident happened in Mexico's Estadio Azteca where the overcrowding of the two concerts left the grass with "severe" damages. NFL had to move their premiere match between Kansas City Chiefs and Los Angeles Rams to a different stadium in Los Angeles.
- Lebanese police arrested 2 crazed fans who illegally entered to a ceremony held for Shakira in the Cedars reserve in Tannourine hours before her concert.
- During the concert in Toronto heavy rain started to fall outside the arena, the rain caused floods in the city, Scotiabank Arena was flooded as well due to drainage failure.
- An overly excited fan stormed on stage at the end of the concert in Mexico City, Shakira hugged and took a picture with the fan while security tried to escort him off stage.

== Set list ==
This set list was used for the show held on June 3, 2018 in Hamburg, Germany. It does not represent all dates of the tour.

1. "Estoy Aquí" / "¿Dónde Estás Corazón?"
2. "She Wolf"
3. "Si Te Vas"
4. "Nada"
5. "Perro Fiel" (contains elements of "El Perdón" by Nicky Jam)
6. "Underneath Your Clothes"
7. "Me Enamoré"
8. "Inevitable"
9. "Chantaje"
10. "Whenever, Wherever" (contains elements of "Ojos Así" and "Despedida")
11. "Tú"
12. "Amarillo"
13. "La Tortura"
14. "Antología"
15. "Can't Remember to Forget You"
16. "Loca" / "Rabiosa"
17. "La La La (Brazil 2014)" / "Waka Waka (This Time for Africa)" (preceded by an instrumental interlude that contains elements of "La Bicicleta" and "We Will Rock You")
  Encore
18. "Toneladas"
19. "Hips Don't Lie"
20. "La Bicicleta"
Notes
- During the tour's performances in the Francophone (French-speaking) regions of Antwerp, Bordeaux, Luxembourg, Montpellier, Montreal, Paris and Zürich, Shakira performed a cover of Francis Cabrel's "Je l'aime à mourir" in the place of "Toneladas".
- On select dates in the Hispanosphere, Shakira opted to perform the original Spanish versions of several of her more well-known English songs.
- In Bilbao, Basque Country, "La La La (Brazil 2014)" was performed in Spanish, while on the rest of the Hispanosphere, Shakira sang the English version.
- During her second show in Barcelona, Shakira performed a cover of Sau's "Boig per Tu", in Catalan, as a dedication to her then-father-in-law, Joan Piqué.

== Broadcasts and recordings ==
On 27 August 2018, Shakira posted a video and then made a survey on her Twitter account about which one of the three Balmain shirts she alternately wore during first section of concert would be chosen for a next tour date. The day after that, Hans Nelson, a tour crew member, posted on his Instagram account that indeed the two concerts to be held at The Forum, Los Angeles, California, would be taped for a future live DVD release. On the date of the rescheduled second show in the city, the singer herself confirmed through her social networks that the concert of that day would be recorded for a concert film. Soon after the tour ended, Shakira announced she has started the editing process of the tour DVD.

On November 13 and 15, 2019 was released in selected cinemas around the world the recording of the show in Los Angeles at The Forum. It's called Shakira In Concert: El Dorado World Tour. The concert film grossed $294,677 worldwide.

== Shows ==
List of concerts, showing date, city, country, venue, opening acts, tickets sold, number of available tickets and amount of gross revenue
Date	City	Country	Venue	Opening act(s)	Attendance	Revenue
Eurasia (Note: All the European and North American dates are postponed from their original events for vocal rest after a haemorrhage acquired in Shakira's right vocal chord in October 2017.)
3 June 2018	Hamburg	Germany	Barclaycard Arena	Salva	—N/a	—N/a
5 June 2018	Cologne	Germany	Lanxess Arena	Salva	12,643 / 15,183 (83.27%)	$986,682
7 June 2018	Antwerp	Belgium	Sportpaleis	Salva	—N/a	—N/a
9 June 2018	Amsterdam	Netherlands	Ziggo Dome	Salva	—N/a	—N/a
11 June 2018	London	England	The O_{2} Arena	Salva	14,119 / 17,804 (79.30%)	$1,203,810
13 June 2018	Paris	France	AccorHotels Arena	Salva	29,067 / 31,701 (91.69%)	$2,235,262
14 June 2018	Paris	France	AccorHotels Arena	Salva	29,067 / 31,701 (91.69%)	$2,235,262
17 June 2018	Munich	Germany	Olympiahalle	Salva	—N/a	—N/a
19 June 2018	Esch-sur-Alzette (Note: Labelled as Luxembourg in promotional material.)	Luxembourg	Rockhal	Salva	—N/a	—N/a
21 June 2018	Assago (Note: Labelled as Milan in promotional material.)	Italy	Mediolanum Forum	Salva	—N/a	—N/a
22 June 2018	Zürich	Switzerland	Hallenstadion	Salva	13,893 / 13,893 (100%)	$1,062,990
24 June 2018	Bordeaux	France	Bordeaux Métropole Arena	Salva	—N/a	—N/a
25 June 2018	Montpellier	France	Sud de France Arena	Salva	—N/a	—N/a
28 June 2018	Lisbon	Portugal	Altice Arena	Salva	17,219 / 18,565 (92.75%)	$1,153,896
30 June 2018	Bilbao	Spain	Bizkaia Arena	Salva	—N/a	—N/a
1 July 2018	La Coruña	Spain	Coliseum da Coruña	Salva	—N/a	—N/a
3 July 2018	Madrid	Spain	WiZink Center	Salva	15,810 / 15,961 (99%)	$1,510,116
6 July 2018	Barcelona	Spain	Palau Sant Jordi	Salva	30,128 / 32,260 (93%)	$2,940,115
7 July 2018	Barcelona	Spain	Palau Sant Jordi	Salva	30,128 / 32,260 (93%)	$2,940,115
11 July 2018	Istanbul	Turkey	Vodafone Park	—N/a	—N/a	—N/a
13 July 2018 (Note: The concert of 13 July 2018 at Cedars Of God, Bsharri, was part of the Cedars International Festival.)	Bsharri	Lebanon	Cedars International Festival Plateau	—N/a	—N/a	—N/a
North America
3 August 2018	Chicago	United States	United Center	Salva	12,698 / 13,555 (93.68%)	$1,495,163
4 August 2018	Detroit	United States	Little Caesars Arena	Salva	8,555 / 12,291 (85.91%)	$691,327
7 August 2018	Toronto	Canada	Scotiabank Arena	Salva	13,703 / 13,703 (100%)	$1,224,134
8 August 2018	Montreal	Canada	Bell Centre	Salva	11,625 / 11,625 (100%)	$1,149,640
10 August 2018	New York City	United States	Madison Square Garden	Salva	12,921 / 12,921 (100%)	$2,003,172
11 August 2018	Washington, D.C.	United States	Capital One Arena	Salva	12,954 / 13,596 (96.62%)	$1,430,669
14 August 2018	Orlando	United States	Amway Center	Salva	11,024 / 11,024 (100%)	$1,056,389
15 August 2018	Sunrise	United States	BB&T Center	Salva	10,693 / 10,693 (100%)	$1,058,920
17 August 2018	Miami	United States	American Airlines Arena	Salva	23,399 / 23,399 (100%)	$2,824,054
18 August 2018	Miami	United States	American Airlines Arena	Salva	23,399 / 23,399 (100%)	$2,824,054
21 August 2018	Dallas	United States	American Airlines Center	Salva	12,265 / 13,027 (94.86%)	$1,331,059
22 August 2018	Houston	United States	Toyota Center	Salva	11,085 / 11,467 (96.53%)	$1,486,730
24 August 2018	San Antonio	United States	AT&T Center	Salva	12,967 / 13,750 (94.31%)	$1,417,604
26 August 2018	Phoenix	United States	Talking Stick Resort Arena	Salva	11,952 / 12,049 (99.20%)	$1,223,755
28 August 2018	Inglewood (Note: Labelled as Los Angeles in promotional material.)	United States	The Forum	Salva	25,134 / 25,134 (100%) (Note: The score data is combined from the shows held at The Forum on August 28 and September 3.)	$2,386,573
31 August 2018	Anaheim	United States	Honda Center	Salva	12,169 / 14,457 (84%)	$1,095,346
1 September 2018	Las Vegas	United States	MGM Grand Garden Arena	Salva	11,851 / 11,851 (100%)	$1,331,232
3 September 2018 (Note: The show of September 3, 2018 at The Forum in Inglewood was originally scheduled on 29 August 2018 but was postponed to 3 September 2018 due to a virus infection acquired by Shakira.)	Inglewood (Note: Labelled as Los Angeles in promotional material.)	United States	The Forum	Salva	—	—
5 September 2018	San Diego	United States	Valley View Casino Center	Salva	9,539 / 9,539 (100%)	$1,186,387
6 September 2018	San Jose	United States	SAP Center	Salva	11,514 / 11,514 (100%)	$1,357,728
7 September 2018 (Note: The concert of 7 September 2018 at Bill Graham Civic Auditorium in San Francisco is part of the Rakuten Optimism 2018.)	San Francisco	United States	Bill Graham Civic Auditorium	—N/a	—N/a	—N/a
11 October 2018	Mexico City	Mexico	Estadio Azteca	—N/a	—N/a	—N/a
12 October 2018	Mexico City	Mexico	Estadio Azteca	—N/a	—N/a	—N/a
14 October 2018	Guadalajara	Mexico	Estadio Tres de Marzo	—N/a	—N/a	—N/a
16 October 2018	Monterrey	Mexico	Estadio Universitario	—N/a	—N/a	—N/a
18 October 2018	Punta Cana	Dominican Republic	Hard Rock Hotel & Casino	—N/a	—N/a	—N/a
South America
21 October 2018	São Paulo	Brazil	Allianz Parque	Cat Dealers	44,084 / 44,084 (100%)	$3,087,197
23 October 2018	Porto Alegre	Brazil	Arena do Grêmio	Cat Dealers	28,268 / 28,268 (100%)	$2,092,641
25 October 2018	Buenos Aires	Argentina	Estadio Vélez Sarsfield	Marko Silva	—N/a	—N/a
27 October 2018	Rosario	Argentina	Estadio Gigante de Arroyito	Marko Silva	—N/a	—N/a
30 October 2018	Santiago	Chile	Estadio Nacional de Chile	Francisca Valenzuela	51,382 / 51,382 (100%)	$3,591,447
1 November 2018	Guayaquil	Ecuador	Estadio Modelo Alberto Spencer	Naíza	—N/a	—N/a
3 November 2018	Bogotá	Colombia	Parque Simón Bolívar	Systema Solar	—N/a	—N/a
Total					491,561 / 528,654 (93%)	$33,783,011

== Cancelled shows ==
List of cancelled concerts, showing date, city, country, venue and reason for cancellation
Date	City	Country	Venue	Reason
28 November 2017	Lyon	France	Halle Tony Garnier	Cancelled due to vocal chord injury
