= AKT (disambiguation) =

Protein kinase B, also known as Akt, is a serine/threonine-specific protein kinase.

AKT, Akt or akt may also refer to:

== Organizations and companies ==
- AKT motos, a Colombian motorcycle company
- akt (charity), a British charity for LGBTQ+ young people
- AKT InMotion, an American fitness company
- AKT II, a British construction and civil engineering company
- Agder Kollektivtrafikk (AKT), a Norwegian public transport administrator
- Akita Television (AKT), a Japanese television station
- Finnish Transport Workers' Union (Finnish: Auto- ja Kuljetusalan Työntekijäliitto AKT)
- Musiikkituottajat (formerly known as Suomen Ääni- ja kuvatallennetuottajat ÄKT), a Finnish music organization
- Karat (airline) (ICAO: AKT), in Russia

== Other uses ==
- AKT1, AKT2, or AKT3, enzymes
- Erich Akt (1898–?), German politician
- Akolet language (ISO 639-3: akt), an Austronesian language
- RAF Akrotiri (IATA: AKT), an airport in Cyprus

== See also ==
- ACT (disambiguation)
