= Dare (La La La) =

2014 single by Shakira

Single by Shakira

from the album Shakira
- Released: 28 March 2014
- Recorded: 2012
- Studio: Cia dos Tecnicos Studios (Rio de Janeiro); Estudio Avioes do Forro (Fortaleza); Groove Studios (Salvador)
- Genre: Electro house; dance-pop
- Length: 3:06 (original version); 3:17 (Brazil 2014 version)
- Label: RCA
- Songwriters: Shakira; Jay Singh; Lukasz Gottwald; Mathieu Jomphe-Lepine; Max Martin; Henry Walter; Raelene Arreguin; John J. Conte, Jr.
- Producers: Dr. Luke; Shakira; J2; Cirkut; Billboard

Shakira singles chronology
"Empire" (2014)	"Dare (La La La)" (2014)	"Mi Verdad" (2015)

Carlinhos Brown singles chronology
"Vc, o Amor e Eu" (2014)	"La La La (Brazil 2014)" (2014)	"Faz Um" (2014)

Music videos
- "Dare (La La La)" on YouTube; "La La La (Spanish)" on YouTube; "La La La (Brazil 2014)" on YouTube; "La La La (Brasil 2014)" on YouTube

"Dare (La La La)" is a song recorded by Colombian singer-songwriter Shakira from her self-titled tenth studio album Shakira (2014). The song was first released to contemporary hit radio in Italy on 28 March 2014, as the third single from the album, and was later released in a remix bundle in the United States via RCA Records. The song was co-written by Shakira, Jay Singh (J2), Dr. Luke, Mathieu Jomphe-Lepine, Max Martin, Cirkut, Raelene Arreguin and John J. Conte, Jr. while the production was handled by J2, Dr. Luke, Shakira, Cirkut and Billboard. The song is an uptempo dance-pop song built over drums and chants. A Spanish-language translation of the song, titled "La La La", was also released in Mexico, Guatemala, El Salvador, Honduras, Nicaragua, Costa Rica, Panama, Dominican Republic, Puerto Rico, Cuba, Colombia, Venezuela, Peru, Chile, Bolivia, Paraguay, Uruguay, Argentina, Ecuador, and Spain.

A reworked version of the song titled "La La La (Brazil 2014)" was released on 27 May as the second theme song for the 2014 World Cup Official Album. This was Shakira's second time singing a theme song for the FIFA World Cup (the first being in 2010); she also sang the 2006 World Cup theme song, "Hips Don't Lie/Bamboo" (featuring Wyclef Jean), which was a remake of her worldwide hit "Hips Don't Lie". The song included new lyrics and features Brazilian musician Carlinhos Brown. The version was praised by music critics and fared well commercially. An accompanying video was directed by Shakira's long time collaborator Jaume de Laiguana, the music video is influenced by Afro-Brazilian heritage and tribal imagery and features cameos from a variety of football players including Lionel Messi, Neymar, Cesc Fàbregas, Sergio Agüero, Radamel Falcao, James Rodríguez, Eric Abidal, Shakira's then-boyfriend Gerard Piqué and their son Milan. Both versions of the song are Shakira's only collaborations with Dr. Luke.

Commercially, the single fared well, notably reaching number one in Brazil and Greece, as well as entering the top ten in several other countries, including Colombia and Lebanon. (Note: See #Charts)

== Background ==
After the success of her ninth studio album, Sale el Sol (2010), Shakira revealed in November 2011, "I've begun to explore in the recording studio whenever I have time in Barcelona and here in Miami. I'm working with different producers and DJs, and I try to feed off from that and find new sources of inspiration and new musical motivation. I'm anxious to return to the studio." In 2012, it was reported that Shakira was shooting the video for the tentative-first single "Truth or Dare" in Lisbon, Portugal. However, due to Shakira's pregnancy, the song was not released. Later, in March 2014, Shakira explained to Billboard that, "It's been two-and-a-half years of making songs, trashing them, doing them again, doing eight versions of each song, having a baby, doing The Voice, coming back to the studio, reconnecting with my songs".

== Release and remix ==
After a 2012 leak of the filming of the first version of the video, speculation arose that the song would be her comeback single. The song was finally premiered in March 2014, prior to the album release, in the Activia launch commercial for the "Dare to feel good" campaign, directed by Jaume Delaiguana.

After release the first two singles from the album, "Can't Remember to Forget You" and "Empire". RCA chose "Dare (La La La)" as third single. The song was first released to contemporary hit radio in Italy on 28 March 2014. Only on 12 May 2014 the song was officially released worldwide with extended play remixed by Chuckie and Chus & Ceballos. On 20 May, the song was released in Germany as double single with the "La La La (Brazil 2014)" version. The World Cup version was officially released on 27 May to impact radio stations, features Brazilian musician Carlinhos Brown. In the United Kingdom the song was released on 28 May.

About a year after its release, the original recordings of the song, in both English and Spanish, were leaked in HQ on SoundCloud, entitled "Truth or Dare" and "Adentro" respectively. The two versions are extended out to 4:43 (which was the original length when the song was announced) with an extended intro and outro. The two versions have Shakira's voice more pronounced during the "La la la" chorus and a slightly different instrumentation.

== Composition ==
"Dare (La La La)" is an uptempo dance track that contains Brazilian beats and takes influence from electro house, with a Spanish version of the song also recorded for the album. The song is built over big drums, and chants. The song was originally named "Truth Or Dare (On The Dancefloor)". The shooting of the music video was leaked in 2012 with half of the song being leaked in LQ. Since the leak fans took Twitter and Facebook making trending topics for Shakira to release the song. The singer announced the official track list of her 10th studio album Shakira in 2014 and the song was featured on the track list with a new title "Dare (La La La)" and a Spanish version titled "La La La". The song fully leaked one day before the European album release date.

In January 2014, FIFA and Sony Music announced that the official song for the tournament will be "We Are One (Ole Ola)" by Pitbull, Jennifer Lopez and Claudia Leitte. A customized version of the song "Dare (La La La)" by Shakira, who provided the official song of the 2010 tournament, will be used as a secondary theme song. Shakira featured Brazilian musician Carlinhos Brown for a re-worked version of the song which is entitled "La La La (Brasil 2014)". The song is included on the Latin American, Spanish, and international (Note: Only physical copies of the international deluxe edition feature La La La (Brasil 2014)) deluxe editions of the album and features new lyrics for the 2014 World Cup.

The song was first released as a CD in Germany on 23 May 2014, shortly after the single was sent to Contemporary Hit Radio in Italy on 28 May 2014, the following day the single was released for digital download in the United Kingdom. Upon release "La La La (Brazil) was met with positive reviews from music critics. Digital Spy praised the song's music video and production in particularly the song's "chants" and drums", the publication also placed the song at number six on their list of "8 World Cup Anthems of 2014". The online publication Idoltor praised the song and its "catchy" composition.

== Music videos ==
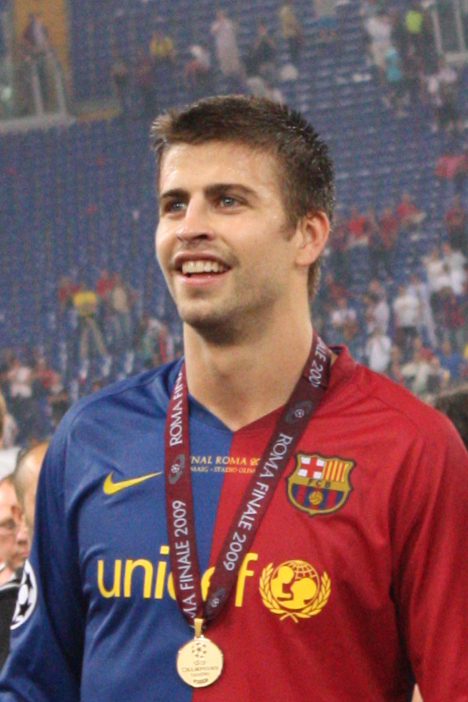
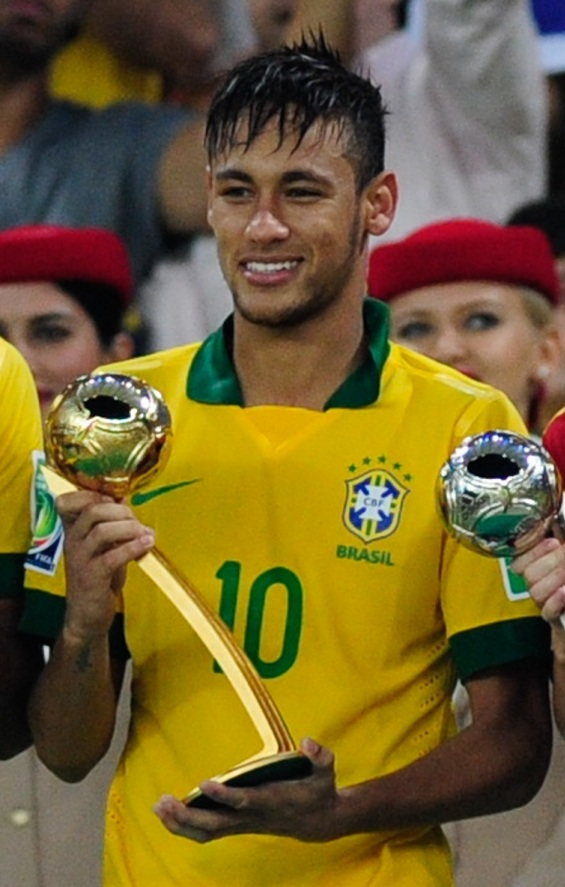
Gerard Piqué (left) and Neymar (right) were two of many footballers to appear in the Brazil 2014 version official video.

The music videos for "Dare (La La La)" and "La La La" (Spanish version) were premiered on 7 May 2014 via Shakira's VEVO channel on YouTube. A portion of the recording of the chorus part video was leaked in mid-2012, proving the video was recorded before Shakira got pregnant, and a leak of nearly half the song followed. The videos were recorded in Lisbon, Portugal. Both versions were directed by Anthony Mandler.

The original music video sees Shakira dancing while wearing a black leather bra top and a matching maxiskirt, the video continues with Shakira dancing up a multicolored awl and on top of a building. The video also features street parties and crowds, with carnival themes. Online publication Idolator praised the video saying, the video is a "typical Shakira fashion" based around "an exotic location, bizarre dance moves and her now trademark stroll through a field," they further more praised the carnival scenes which "suits" the song.

The music video for the World Cup version was premiered on 22 May 2014, which was directed by Jaume de Laiguana, who had previously worked with Shakira on a variety of music videos including "Don't Bother", "Gypsy", "Loca", "Sale el Sol", "Rabiosa". The song's accompanying video was produced with Activia in support of the World Food Programme's School Meals Program. Shakira and Activia donated funds to support the program. On 30 May 2014, Spanish version of the video was premiered.

The video is a "consciously surreal video" that takes influence from Afro-Brazilian heritage with tribal imagery, combining capoeira and footballer moves for an "artsy athletic displays". After the release of the video, it came to light that the video featured nearly shot-for-shot recreations of French artist WoodKid's video for his song "Iron". WoodKid denied having given permission to use these images in the video.

During the video Shakira balances a ball wearing a long black skirt. The video includes footballers Lionel Messi, Neymar, Cesc Fàbregas, Sergio Agüero, Radamel Falcao, James Rodríguez and Eric Abidal. Shakira's then-boyfriend Gerard Piqué and their son Milan appear in the video as well. 40 days after release the video hit 200 million views, and as of May 2024, it has received over 1.3 billion views.

== Live performances ==
Shakira performed the song for the first time on 10 July on a Brazilian show called Fantástico, which aired on 13 July 2014, the same day that Shakira performed the song at the 2014 World Cup Closing Ceremony, confirmed by FIFA and herself. The song was also included as part of the El Dorado World Tour setlist in 2018.

== Track listing ==
CD single – Original version

1. "Dare (La La La)" – 3:06

CD single – Brazil 2014 version

1. "La La La (Brazil 2014)" (featuring Carlinhos Brown) – 3:17

Spanish CD single – Original version

1. "La La La (Spanish version)" – 3:06

Spanish CD single – Brazil 2014 version

1. "La La La (Brasil 2014) [Spanish version]" (featuring Carlinhos Brown) – 3:17

European CD single

1. "Dare (La La La)" – 3:06
2. "La La La (Brazil 2014)" (featuring Carlinhos Brown) – 3:17

Remixes

1. "Dare (La La La) [Chuckie Remix]" – 4:20
2. "Dare (La La La) [Chus & Ceballos Brazil Fiesta Remix]" – 4:45

== Charts ==
=== Weekly charts ===
Weekly chart performance for "Dare (La La La)"
Chart (2014)	Peak position
Austria (Ö3 Austria Top 40)	14
Belgium (Ultratop 50 Flanders)	9
Belgium (Ultratop 50 Wallonia)	3
Belgium Dance (Ultratop Flanders)	15
Belgium Dance (Ultratop Wallonia)	1
Brazil (Billboard Brasil Hot 100)	1
Bulgaria Airplay (BAMP)	27
Canada Hot 100 (Billboard)	80
CIS Airplay (TopHit)	4
Colombia (National-Report)	3
Czech Republic Airplay (ČNS IFPI)	20
Czech Republic Singles Digital (ČNS IFPI)	44
Denmark (Tracklisten) Brazil 2014 remix	33
Dominican Republic (Monitor Latino)	3
Finland (Suomen virallinen lista)	7
France (SNEP)	11
Germany (GfK)	12
Greece (Billboard)	1
Hungary (Single Top 40)	11
Hungary (Stream Top 40)	8
Ireland (IRMA)	53
Italy (FIMI)	3
Lebanon (The Official Lebanese Top 20)	7
Luxembourg (Billboard)	4
Mexico (Billboard Mexican Airplay)	6
Netherlands (Dutch Tipparade 40)	8
Netherlands (Single Tip)	4
Poland Airplay (ZPAV)	5
Poland Dance (ZPAV)	1
Russia Airplay (TopHit)	3
Slovakia Airplay (ČNS IFPI)	12
Slovenia (SloTop50)	9
South Korea (Gaon International Chart)	10
Spain (Promusicae) Brasil 2014 remix	2
Switzerland (Schweizer Hitparade)	3
Ukraine Airplay (TopHit)	4
US Billboard Hot 100	53
US Hot Dance/Electronic Songs (Billboard)	5
US Dance Club Songs (Billboard)	1
US Latin Airplay (Billboard)	5

Chart (2016)	Peak position
Ukraine Airplay (TopHit)	96

=== Year-end charts ===
2014 year-end chart performance for "Dare (La La La)"
Chart (2014)	Position
Austria (Ö3 Austria Top 40)	54
Belgium (Ultratop Flanders)	59
Belgium (Ultratop Wallonia)	29
France (SNEP)	52
Germany (Official German Charts)	76
Hungary (Single Top 40)	73
Italy (FIMI)	49
Poland (Dance Top 50)	12
Poland (ZPAV Digital sales)	9
Poland (ZPAV/BMAT Airplay)	47
Russia Airplay (TopHit)	62
Spain (PROMUSICAE) Brazil 2014 remix	7
Switzerland (Schweizer Hitparade)	40
Ukraine Airplay (TopHit)	32
US Hot Dance/Electronic Songs (Billboard)	20

== Certifications ==
Certifications and sales for "Dare (La La La)"
Region	Certification	Certified units/sales
Canada (Music Canada)	Platinum	80,000^{‡}
Germany (BVMI)	Gold	150,000^{^}
Italy (FIMI)	Platinum	30,000^{‡}
Mexico (AMPROFON)	Gold	30,000^{*}
Spain (Promusicae)	Platinum	60,000^{‡}
Switzerland (IFPI Switzerland)	Gold	15,000^{^}
United States (RIAA)	Platinum	1,000,000^{‡}
^{*} Sales figures based on certification alone.^{^} Shipments figures based on certification alone.^{‡} Sales+streaming figures based on certification alone.

Certifications and sales for "La La La (Brazil 2014)"
Region	Certification	Certified units/sales
Brazil (Pro-Música Brasil)	Diamond	250,000^{‡}
Mexico (AMPROFON)	Gold	30,000^{*}
United States	—	78,000
Streaming
Spain (Promusicae)	2× Platinum	16,000,000^{†}
^{*} Sales figures based on certification alone.^{†} Streaming-only figures based on certification alone.

== Release history ==
Release dates for "Dare (La La La)"
Country	Date	Format
Italy	28 March 2014	Contemporary hit radio
United States	12 May 2014	Remixes EP
Australia	12 May 2014	Remixes EP
Austria	12 May 2014	Remixes EP
Canada	12 May 2014	Remixes EP
German	12 May 2014	Remixes EP
Denmark	12 May 2014	Remixes EP
France	12 May 2014	Remixes EP
Ireland	12 May 2014	Remixes EP
Italy	12 May 2014	Remixes EP
Norway	12 May 2014	Remixes EP
Spanish	12 May 2014	Remixes EP
Sweden	12 May 2014	Remixes EP
Swiss	12 May 2014	Remixes EP
United Kingdom	12 May 2014	Remixes EP

Release dates for "La La La (Brazil 2014)"
Country	Date	Format
Germany	23 May 2014	CD single
Italy	27 May 2014	Contemporary Hit Radio
United Kingdom	28 May 2014	Digital download
