= Medicine (Shakira song) =

Promotional single by Shakira featuring Blake Shelton

from the album Shakira
- Released: 14 April 2014
- Studio: Estudios Estopa (Barcelona, Spain); Ocean Way Nashville (Nashville, TN)
- Genre: Country pop
- Length: 3:18
- Label: RCA
- Songwriters: Shakira; Mark Bright; Hillary Lindsey
- Producers: Shakira; busbee

Shakira promotional singles chronology
"Blanca Mujer" (2013)	"Medicine" (2014)	"Nada" (2017)

Audio video
- "Medicine" on YouTube

"Medicine" is a song recorded by Colombian singer-songwriter Shakira. It was released as promotional single from her tenth studio album Shakira (2014). Featuring guest vocals from American country music singer Blake Shelton, the song was performed on the 49th Annual Academy of Country Music Awards on April 6, 2014, and spent one week on the country charts at number 57 from unsolicited airplay. The song was written by Shakira alongside Mark Bright and Hillary Lindsey, while the production was handled by Shakira and busbee.

Upon release of the album, "Medicine" debuted (and peaked) on the US Country Airplay chart at number 57 for the week April 12, 2014, giving Shakira her first song to appear on the chart. It also reached the top 20 in Lebanon. (Note: See #Charts)

== Background ==
After the success of her ninth studio album, Sale el Sol (2010), Shakira revealed in November 2011, "I've begun to explore in the recording studio whenever I have time in Barcelona and here in Miami. I'm working with different producers and DJs, and I try to feed off from that and find new sources of inspiration and new musical motivation. I'm anxious to return to the studio. My body is asking for it." In 2012, it was reported that Shakira was shooting the video for the tentative-first single "Truth or Dare" in Lisbon, Portugal. However, due to Shakira's pregnancy, the song was not released. Later, in March 2014, Shakira explained to Billboard that, "It's been two-and-a-half years of making songs, trashing them, doing them again, doing eight versions of each song, having a baby, doing The Voice, coming back to the studio, reconnecting with my songs."

In December 2013, Sony Music Entertainment reported that Shakira's new single would be released in January 2014, and that it was supposed to be a duet with Barbadian recording artist Rihanna. On January 13, 2014, "Can't Remember to Forget You" was released and indeed features Rihanna, which was followed by the release of the second single "Empire".

== Writing ==
The initial idea for the song came about when Shakira told Shelton that she wanted to work with Nashville musicians due to growing tired of L.A. perspective, Shakira's aim was to get "another point of view" from "real people with roots with whom I feel comfortable working in the same room." Shakira added that she has told Shelton that she wanted to do a song that had "the narrative of a country song, that was picturesque, that was a real song," But also needed to "suit" her due to her Colombian roots.

Speaking on the writing of the song Shakira revealed that she has folk roots in her previous albums and wanted to incorporate those elements into her self-titled album, when writing the song Shakira tried many different genres saying "When I wrote ['Medicine'], I didn't know what direction to go in and I did, like, eight versions … dance, pop. But, I said, no, this is a country song." She later contacted Shelton and told him that a country song is what type of song she wanted to do due to the "acoustic guitars, that type of narrative, songs that have a traditional structure."

In the Spanish version of the track-by-track interview, Shakira herself stated that country music was not completely foreign to her, since she had used similar sounds in previous Spanish songs.

== Release and promotion ==
"Medicine" was made available on 4 April 2014 via streaming.

Shakira promoted the track with live performances. She and Blake Shelton performed "Medicine" together at the 49th Annual Academy of Country Music Awards on April 6, 2014. They both also performed the song on 'The Voice.'

== Critical reception ==
The Boston Globe gave the song a negative review calling it a "misstep" and felt that Shakira did not sound "at home" on the song. Kate Wills of The Independent gave a similar review to the latter calling the duet a "step too far."

== Charts ==
Chart performance for "Medicine"
Chart (2014)	Peak position
Canada Hot 100 (Billboard)	90
Lebanon (The Official Lebanese Top 20)	17
US Bubbling Under Hot 100 (Billboard)	16
US Country Airplay (Billboard)	57
