= The One Thing (Shakira song) =

2014 song by Shakira

Song by Shakira

from the album Shakira
- Released: 21 March 2014
- Recorded: 2013
- Studio: The Ox (North Hollywood, CA); Estopa Estudios (Barcelona, Spain); Sant Feliu de Llobregat (Barcelona, Spain)
- Genre: Pop rock, reggae
- Length: 3:12
- Label: Ace; RCA
- Songwriters: Shakira; Nasri Atweh
- Producers: Shakira; Messinger; Nasri

"The One Thing" is a song by Colombian singer-songwriter Shakira from her tenth, self-titled studio album, Shakira (2014). A guitar based pop rock and reggae song, Shakira dedicated the song for her oldest son Milan. Created by Shakira and The Messengers, the song was praised by critics for its catchy melody and Shakira's vocal performance.

== Background and release ==
In November 2012, Shakira revealed in an interview with Billboard magazine that she had begun writing new material and working with various producers for a new record. The following year, she ended her recording contract with Epic Records and signed under Roc Nation for management purposes. In December 2013, it was announced that Shakira had signed a recording contract with RCA Records, under which the record would be released. On March 21, 2014, the album was released under the eponymous title Shakira. "This album is very close to my heart and reflects a stage in my life", commented Shakira on the album's content. "The One Thing" was the last song Shakira wrote for it.

In November 2020, a fan-made video for "The One Thing" went viral and Shakira shared it on social media. The video consists of clips showing Shakira together with Milan. She showed the video to him, and he loved it.

== Composition ==
"The One Thing" is an anthemic, upbeat pop rock and reggae song with a natural, stripped-down guitar-driven sound. Its chorus is bright and easy to sing along with. The song features lively hand-claps and foot-stomps that add to the infectiousness of its rhythm. The song has been compared to Taylor Swift's album Red and Avril Lavigne's song "My Happy Ending".

Shakira wrote the song for her oldest son Milan, whose early life inspired the song. The lyrics talk about how his birth brought "a new dawn" into her life, turning a childhood dream of hers into reality: "You are the one thing that I got right / It's a fickle world, it's a fickle world / You turned the darkness into sunlight / I'm a lucky girl, yeah I'm a lucky girl."

== Reception ==
"The One Thing" has been praised by critics for its catchy, anthemic qualities, infectious rhythms, and personal, endearing lyrics. Mike Wass from Idolator highlighted that the song has "a sunny sing-a-long chorus", "infectious hand-claps and foot-stomps" and that it is "relentlessly adorable and utterly irresistible." ABC News described the song as big and anthemic and further elaborated stating that it is "built for playing in stadiums." The University News wrote that the song features powerful guitar rhythms that introduce a fresh rock ’n’ roll vibe to Shakira's music and highlight her full-bodied vocals. Rania Aniftos from Neon Tommy considered the song a standout on the album, calling it personal and comparing its sound to Shakira's 2001 single "Whenever, Wherever". Zenaida Gorbea from The Young Folks called the lyrics of the song endearing.

== Live performances ==
Shakira performed "The One Thing" with Kristen Marlin and Tess Boyer from her team on The Voice in April 2014.
