= My Diet Is Better Than Yours =

2016 American reality television series

- Genre: Reality competition
- Presented by: Shaun T
- Country of origin: United States
- Original language: English
- No. of seasons: 1
- No. of episodes: 8

Production
- Executive producers: Kelly Ripa; Mark Consuelos
- Production companies: Kinetic Content; Milojo Productions; Greengrass Productions

Original release
- Network: ABC
- Release: January 7 – February 25, 2016

My Diet Is Better Than Yours is an American reality competition television series which premiered on ABC on January 7, 2016. The weight-loss series features five contestants who each picks a trainer and a type of diet that they believe are the most suitable for them; the competitors subsequently drop their trainers in the elimination process if the results are not satisfactory.

== Trainers ==
The trainers, their background and their method of dieting chosen throughout the program are:

- Shaun T – Host
- Anna Kaiser – Co-host
- Dawn Jackson Blatner
- Abel James
- Carolyn Barnes
- Rob Sulaver
- Jovanka Ciares
- Jennifer Cassetta
- Jay Cardiello

== Contestant Progress ==
Contestant	Age	Diet	Starting Weight	Weight Lost By Week								Total Lost	Ending Weight	Result
Contestant	Age	Diet	Starting Weight	1	2	3	4	5	6	7	8-14	Total Lost	Ending Weight	Result
Jasmin	37	The Superfood Swap Diet	200	-9	-3	-4	-2	-6	-1	-5	-23	-53 lbs (-26.5%)	147	$50,000
Kurt	47	The Paleolithic Wild Diet	352	-16	-5	-11	-5	-7	-6	-7	-30	-87 lbs (-24.72%)	265	RUNNER-UP
Latasha	35	The Clean Momma Plan (In Episode 5, changed to); The Nutrient Timing Plan	243	-6	-3	-1	-1	-5	-4	-4	-21	-45 lbs (-18.52%)	198	THIRD
Jeff	35	The No Diet Plan	359	-10	-7	-1	-8	-6	-3	-5	-24	-64 lbs (-17.83%)	295	FOURTH
Taj	37	The Wellness Smackdown (In Episode 3, changed to); The Strong, Safe, Sexy Plan	213	-6	-0	-4	-3	-2	-1	QUIT		-16 lbs (7.51%)	197	FIFTH

Jasmin with The Superfood Swap Diet won the competition and won $50,000.

== Episodes ==
No.	Title	Original release date	U.S. viewers (millions)
1	"Let the Diets Begin"	January 7, 2016	2.42
The contestants meet experts and start working to lose weight.
2	"Cookiegate"	January 7, 2016	2.42
The contestants get frustrated and tensions build.
3	"Strong, Safe & Sexy"	January 14, 2016	2.11
The contestants try to adapt to their new lives with the diets.
4	"The One Month Mark"	January 14, 2016	2.11
The experts try to push their contestants to meet their goal, but not everyone is pleased.
5	"The Dreaded 5K"	January 21, 2016	2.22
The contestants get ready to run 5 km.
6	"Fight for Your Life"	January 21, 2016	2.22
Contestants are successful with their plans and exercise while others struggle.
7	"Run for Your Life"	January 28, 2016	2.08
The experts say goodbye to their contestants who are ready to compete the half marathon.
8	"The Final Weigh In"	January 28, 2016	2.08
The pressure becomes too much for some people.
