= Shakira (album) =

- Standard cover

Studio album by Shakira
- Released: 21 March 2014
- Recorded: 2012–2013
- Studios: Estudios Estopa (Barcelona, Spain); Harpoon Club House (London, England); Sonora Recorders (Los Angeles, CA); Westlake (Los Angeles, CA); Mesk (Cairo, Egypt); The Ox (Hollywood, CA); Cia dos Tecnicos (Rio de Janeiro, Brazil); Estudio Avioes do Forro (Fortaleza, Brazil); Groove (Salvador, Brazil); Swing House (Los Angeles, CA); Ocean Way Nashville (Nashville, TN); Echo (Los Angeles, CA); Platinum Sound (New York, NY); Record Plant (Los Angeles, CA); Luke's in the Boo (Malibu, CA)
- Genre: Pop
- Length: 41:45
- Languages: English; Spanish; Catalan
- Label: RCA
- Producers: Roy "Battleroy" Battle; Billboard; Busbee; Cirkut; Fernando Garibay; Dr. Luke; John Hill; J2; Kid Harpoon; Kosakovsky; Greg Kurstin; Steve Mac; Adam Messinger; Nasri; Luis Fernando Ochoa; Shakira

Shakira chronology
| Live from Paris (2011) | Shakira (2014) | El Dorado (2017) |

Singles from Shakira
- 1. "Can't Remember to Forget You" Released: 13 January 2014; 2. "Empire" Released: 24 February 2014; 3. "Dare (La La La)" Released: 25 March 2014

Shakira is the tenth studio album and fourth English-language album by Colombian singer-songwriter Shakira. It was released on 21 March 2014, via RCA Records, her first English-language album since her eighth studio album, She Wolf (2009). Shakira revealed in November 2011 that she had begun work on the album, which continued into 2013. The album was initially set to be released in 2012, but was delayed because of Shakira's pregnancy, which caused her to scrap most of the recorded songs and start making new ones. Since starting the album, Shakira departed Epic Records, signed a new management deal with Roc Nation and subsequently signed to Epic's sister label, RCA Records.

A pop album, Shakira has a diverse musical style that incorporates a range of genres such as reggae and rock, as well as dance and country elements. Its production is characterized by lean, tender verses and muscular, ecstatic choruses, that incorporate swirling, crashing sounds. The album's lyrics explore motherhood, the complexities of romantic relationships, stages of love and the search for personal happiness. Most of the album was written by Shakira, along with Nasri and Adam Messinger, with all the previous predominantly producing the album.

Upon release Shakira was met with positive reviews from music critics, praising its lyrical content, while others stated that Shakira was trying to "Americanize her sound". Commercially, the album debuted at number two on the US Billboard 200 chart with first week sales of 85,000 copies. By doing so, Shakira became the singer's highest-charting album on the chart, although it also achieved her lowest first-week sales figure (for an English-language album). The album campaign started in 2014, with the release of its first single, "Can't Remember to Forget You", followed by the singles "Empire" and "Dare (La La La)". The album has sold 900,000 copies worldwide in the year of 2014 according to PROMUSICAE, the organisation responsible for the Spanish Albums Chart.

== Background ==
In October 2010, Shakira released her ninth studio album, Sale el Sol. The record marked a return to her musical roots after her experimentation with electronic music and was primarily a Latin pop album with influences of rock and merengue music. It garnered critical acclaim and was a commercial success internationally. A year later in November, Shakira revealed in an interview with Billboard magazine that she had begun writing new material and working with various producers for a new record. The following year, she ended her recording contract with Epic Records and signed under Roc Nation for management purposes. In December 2013, it was announced that Shakira had signed a recording contract with RCA Records, under which the record would be released.

== Recording ==
"I already started to write new material. I've begun to explore in the recording studio whenever I have time in Barcelona and here in Miami. I'm working with different producers and DJs, and I try to feed off from that and find new sources of inspiration and new musical motivation. I'm anxious to return to the studio. My body is asking for it."

— Shakira describing the artistic transition she experienced during the production of Shakira.

In November 2011, Shakira said about her tenth album: "I already started to write new material. I've begun to explore in the recording studio whenever I have time in Barcelona and here in Miami. I'm working with different producers and DJs, and I try to feed off from that and find new sources of inspiration and new musical motivation. I'm anxious to return to the studio. My body is asking for it". In February 2012, Shakira revealed a picture of herself, LMFAO and Akon working in the studio together, it was also revealed she was working with other producers such as Benny Blanco, Tiësto, RedOne, Max Martin, Dr. Luke. The following month, Shakira took to Twitter to reveal she has been working with American singer and songwriter Ester Dean, as well as working with other producers including Fernando Garibay, Sia. The same month it was revealed once again via Twitter Shakira had been working with The Runners, The Dream, Shea Taylor and Billboard.

Blake Shelton, Rihanna and Magic! are all known to make guest appearances on the album. The initial idea for the song with Blake Shelton came about when Shakira told Shelton that she wanted to work with Nashville musicians due to growing tired of L.A. perspective, Shakira's aim was to get "another point of view" from "real people with roots with whom I feel comfortable working in the same room." Shakira added that she has told Shelton that she wanted to do a song that had "the narrative of a country song, that was picturesque, that was a real song," But also needed to "suit" her due to her Colombian roots. Speaking on the writing of the song Shakira revealed that she has folk roots in her previous albums and wanted to incorporate those elements into her self-titled album, when writing the song Shakira tried a large style of different genres saying "When I wrote ['Medicine'], I didn't know what direction to go in and I did, like, eight versions ... dance, pop. But, I said, no, this is a country song." She later contacted Shelton and told him that a country song is what type of song she wanted to do due to the "acoustic guitars, that type of narrative, songs that have a traditional structure."

On 1 September 2013, Shakira gave an update on her album, stating: "Amazing day in the studio! 2 years and I finally feel in these songs as comfortable as [I do] in my torn jeans!". In November, she confirmed via her official Facebook that she was writing the final lyrics for the record. In January 2014, Shakira spoke on the album's recording and production, saying that she was "so happy" to be sharing her album "with you all", Shakira continued to speak about the album; saying it was something she had "been working on for over two years now." In the same interview Shakira elaborated saying "The work on this album has spanned a very eventful time, with many ups and downs but ultimately, the happiest period in my life thus far, including the birth of my son. I've explored many different directions, worked with many different people, and written many, many demos before arriving at the finished product I will soon be presenting to you." In January 2014, Shakira released a statement through her Facebook regarding the album's recording process:

"In the end, what I realized is that throughout the course of creating this body of work, I learned a lot about myself. Though I didn't realize it at the time, all the directions I began exploring in the initial phases of recording were helping to pave a path for me of rediscovery. In the end I realized that I will always be a little bit of everything and I don't have to choose, I am sometimes extremely sensitive, sometimes upbeat, others dreamy and romantic, and even at times a little melodramatic. (Call it the Caribbean blood.) But always authentic and always sincere. Most importantly, I am enough., imperfections and all. So what I am offering you now is just that."

== Music and lyrics ==
"I realized that it's not exactly a thematic album, though love is and always has been one of my main subjects and sources for inspiration. It's also not necessarily conceptual, as some of my albums have been in the past"

— Shakira describing the album's musical themes.

Musically the album was described as an "uneasy bargain" between a "rootsy, often acoustic-based pop with a rangy feel and an affinity for early Alanis Morissette" that Shakira wanted and the producers' desire for hits. Emily Mackay of Digitalsy characterised the album as being a "fine balance" between Shakira's style and "what's best about" her and trying to stay relevant in the music industries rat race. When first announcing the record, Shakira described its sound as being "a little bit of rock, a little bit of folk, a little reggae and naturally some dance." On Shakira, she blends an "array" of musical influences and flavors that follow in the same vein as previous albums. Mixing a variety of genres including "dance-pop, Spanish, reggae and rock," the album lyrically talks about how she loves, both in her relationship and as a mother.

Mike Wass from Idolator described Shakira as being a blend of experimental "poetic pop" songs that take influence from a range of genres including reggae, dance, rock and country. Kevin Harley of the Independent described the album's musical content as being built upon "reggae-tinged, bouncy melodies," and noted the album's lyrics as being "absurd" and "occasionally quite poetic." Lyrically the album focus on topics including love and motherhood, whilst the album's music was described by Leila Cobo from Billboard as being "cohesive" with an "organic set" that's roots "lie mostly in melodic pop-rock and unexpected touches from multiple influences." Shakira is built on "lean, tender" verses and "muscular, ecstatic" choruses, and incorporate "swirling, crashing" sounds noted on "Spotlight". Throughout the album Shakira sings about searching for "realization of personal happiness," which was noted as a "recurring topic".

According to James Reed of The Boston Globe, Shakira is the singer's most "personal effort in years", Reed continued to praise Shakira and the album's lyrical content which he described, saying "She sounds at ease and reborn on this new album, proudly addressing the joy of new love from both her child and partner." Leila Cobo from Billboard noted the change in the album's lyrical and musical style to that of She Wolf (2009), Cobo said "Instead, get ready for a set of convincing, honest music, on which the Colombian star often unabashedly professes her love for boyfriend Gerard Pique. Perhaps love is what makes this album soar."

== Songs ==
"Can't Remember to Forget You" (2014)
A 42-second sample of the song featuring Rihanna and Shakira where the chorus of the song "I Can't Remember to Forget You" is heard.

The album opens with "Dare (La La La)", the song an uptempo dance track that contains Brazilian beats and takes influence from electronica, with a Spanish version of the song also recorded for the album. The following track, "Can't Remember to Forget You", is an uptempo new wave and reggae rock track that incorporates elements of ska. The song opens with a "low-slung, reggae-tinged verse" before moving into a "guitar-heavy" chorus which contains "ska guitars and horns" and a "chunky rock arrangement". Lyrically, the song concerns a man that Shakira can not get off her mind, discussing how easy it is to forget how bad someone is for you when you still love them. "Empire" is a mid-tempo rock-influenced song, described as being Shakira's biggest rock transition in a long time since her earlier music. The song begins with an acoustic "sparse" intro and builds up to an anthemic rock tune. Lyrically, the track talks about a bursting passion that the singer simply cannot express in words.

The track "You Don't Care About Me" is a bruised and moody midtempo Latin pop song. The song contains "syncopated beats" and a "slightly retro 60s sound", that lyrically discusses "spite". "Cut Me Deep", a collaboration between Shakira and MAGIC!, is a reggae-pop song. The song is built over a reggae beat, steel drums and horns pick and contain a mixture of ska and rock. The following track "Spotlight" is a pop rock song that and has been compared to the work of Katy Perry and Carly Rae Jepsen. "Spotlight" takes influence from heavy rock tracks, with power guitars that lyrically delivers a "crushing message". "Broken Record" is a love song that follows in the vein as "Empire", the song contains a guitar, before breaking into a power ballad with "grandiose strings". "Medicine" that features Blake Shelton is a country pop ballad, with lyrics such as: "I won't reach for the bottle of whisky/ You won't see me popping the pills. The song "23", is heavily inspired by her boyfriend Gerard Piqué, is a melodic pop rock song with lyrics as; "Hey, do you believe in destiny? 'Cause I do as I did then, when you were only 23."

"The One Thing" is a guitar based pop song that features hand-claps and foot-stomps and takes influence from Shakira's son and motherhood. "Loca por Ti" is a Catalan song (originally by Sau) that pays "homage" to Pique. The Catalan version "Boig per Tu" is available on the Spanish deluxe edition of the album. "Chasing Shadows" is the second of three bonus tracks, an electropop song built over "soaring synths". Lyrically, the song is a "musical love letter:" "It's just you and me and we chase our shadows, just waiting for the sun to go down." "La La La (Brazil 2014)" is included on the Latin American and Spanish deluxe edition of the album; it is a re-worked version of the song "Dare (La La La)" with new lyrics for the 2014 World Cup.

== Singles ==
"Can't Remember to Forget You" served as the lead single from Shakira. The song was released on 13 January 2014, and features Barbadian recording artist Rihanna. The song was met with positive reviews from critics who praised the singers' chemistry. It entered at number 28 on the U.S. Billboard Hot 100, becoming her highest-debuting track in the United States. Its highest Billboard Hot 100 chart position so far is at number 15. As of March 2014, the song has sold 376,000 digital copies in the US. Its accompanying music video was directed by Joseph Kahn, and was premiered through Vevo on 30 January. A solo Spanish-language version of the song, titled "Nunca Me Acuerdo de Olvidarte", was released on 21 January.

"Empire", which was released on 22 February 2014 alongside the album's iTunes pre-order, and served as the album's second Top 40/mainstream single in the US and the UK. It officially impacted Hot Adult Contemporary radio in the U.S. on 22 April 2014. Additionally, it was released in the UK on 5 May 2014. "Empire" was critically acclaimed, with most critics praising the singer for returning to her rock roots. Commercially "Empire" debuted at number 29 on the PROMUSICAE chart, while in France, the song managed to debut at number 82.

"Dare (La La La)" serves as the third single. The song was first released to contemporary hit radio in Italy on 24 April 2014. On 12 May 2014 a remix EP including mixes by Chuckie and Chus & Ceballos was released worldwide. New version of the song titled "La La La (Brazil 2014)" featuring Carlinhos Brown, were released in June for the 2014 FIFA World Cup. Both versions were also released in Spanish, titled "La La La" and "La La La (Brasil 2014)".

== Release and promotion ==
In December 2012, it was reported that Shakira would release a track, named "Truth or Dare" by fans, as the lead single from her record; an accompanying music video was reportedly filmed in Lisbon earlier that year. However, after becoming pregnant by footballer Gerard Piqué, said plans were indefinitely postponed, and never came to fruition. The song was later included on the final track listing of the album, the real name being "Dare (La La La)". In October 2013, Peter Edge from RCA Records announced intentions to premiere an "event single" by Shakira by the end of the year, although this release never occurred. On 6 December 2013, a Twitter page named @ShakiraSpace announced the duet between Shakira and Rihanna. Then, on 8 December 2013, Shakira's body double Alexita Ortiz wrote on social networking site Twitter that she had been working with her on the set for a music video, and mentioned that Rihanna was also involved. The tweet was subsequently removed. Later, Sony Music Entertainment announced that the first single would be released in early 2014.

On 22 January 2014, Shakira announced that the album would be titled Shakira. She elaborated that during the recording process she realized that it was neither "thematic" or "conceptual" as she felt her earlier projects were, instead opining that its production "[helped] to pave a path for me of rediscovery." It was additionally announced that the record would be released on 25 March 2014 in the United States. Shakira later revealed that a Target-exclusive deluxe version of the record would be made available for pre-order on 26 January. Its cover artwork shows Shakira dressed in a sheer cardigan and bra while holding a red guitar. The cover for the standard version features the same image, although the guitar is brown instead of red.

On 25 March 2014, Shakira held an iHeartRadio album release party which was presented by Target and hosted by Ryan Seacrest, live from the iHeartRadio Theater Los Angeles. During the release party Shakira performed four songs from the album; "Empire", "Can't Remember to Forget You", "You Don't Care About Me" and "23". The following day Shakira performed the song "Empire", during a promotional interview with Jimmy Fallon on The Tonight Show Starring Jimmy Fallon. The same day Shakira performed "Hips Don't Lie", "Empire" and "Can't Remember to Forget You" during a live set on The Today Show at the Rockerfella stadium. On 28 March 2014, Shakira performed the album's lead single "Can't Remember to Forget You" at the German music award show Echo. On 29 March 2014, Shakira performed "Empire" on the British version of The Voice. On 18 May 2014, Shakira performed "Empire" once again at the 2014 Billboard Music Awards.

== Commercial performance ==
Shakira entered the UK Albums Chart at number 14, while the album entered the Argentine's weekly chart at number 6. Upon release in the United States, the album debuted at number 2 on the US Billboard 200, with first week sales of 85,000 copies, and in doing so became the singer's highest-charting album on the chart, surpassing the number three peak of Laundry Service (2001), but her lowest first-week sales of her English albums. This sales figure was slightly better than initially predicted in the US for Shakira, which was initially expected to sell 75,000 to 80,000 copies in its first week. It dropped 66% to 29,000 in sales in the second week in the United States, falling from the second place to the fifth place.

== Critical reception ==
Professional ratings
Aggregate scores
| Source | Rating |
|---|---|
| Metacritic | 69/100 |
Review scores
| Source | Rating |
| AllMusic | 3.5/5 stars |
| Billboard | 88/100 |
| Cuepoint (Expert Witness) | A− |
| Digital Spy | 4/5 stars |
| The Independent | 3/5 stars |
| Los Angeles Times | 1.5/4 stars |
| PopMatters | 7/10 |
| Rolling Stone | 3.5/5 stars |
| The Telegraph | 4/5 stars |
| USA Today | 3.5/4 stars |

Shakira garnered generally positive reviews from most music critics. At Metacritic, which assigns a weighted mean rating out of 100 to reviews from mainstream critics, the album received an average score of 69, based on eleven reviews. Leila Cobo of Billboard rated the album 88 out of 100 praising its "convincing, honest music" continuing to say that the album "works on the strength of the songs." At USA Today, Elysa Gardner rated the album three-and-a-half out of four stars, naming it album of the week and stating that, "Hips still don't lie, but Shakira also extols the more settled sense of joy that comes from finding what you were looking for." Emily Mackay of Digital Spy describes the album as "unmistakably Shakira" and "[it] ranges wide across Shakira's styles". At AllMusic, Stephen Thomas Erlewine praised Shakira's presence on the album, commending her for being a "rare" singer who is able to "pull an album together through sheer force of personality", and continuing to praise Shakira's ability to be "comfortable" and sound "powerful". James Reed of The Boston Globe gave a positive review of the album, writing that the release "is a more middle-of-the-road affair, but it's also more revealing."

Kate Wills of The Independent gave the album three out of five stars praising the album's "reggae-tinged," production but was less favorable about the duet with Blake Shelton. In a less positive review Mikeal Woods from the Los Angeles Times felt there was not enough "Shakira in Shakira" and described the album as "predictable and flavorless", Woods continued to say that he feared that Shakira was attempting to "Americanize her sound (or had been coerced into doing so by forces in the music industry)".

== Track listing ==
Standard edition (physical version)
| No. | Title | Writer(s) | Producer(s) | Length |
|---|---|---|---|---|
| 1. | "Can't Remember to Forget You" (featuring Rihanna) | Shakira; John Hill; Tom Hull; Daniel Alexander; Erik Hassle; Robyn Fenty | Shakira; Hill; Kid Harpoon; Kuk Harrell (vocal) | 3:26 |
| 2. | "Empire" | Steve Mac; Ina Wroldsen | Mac; Shakira | 4:03 |
| 3. | "You Don't Care About Me" | Nasri Atweh; Adam Messinger; Chantal Kreviazuk | Shakira; Messinger; Nasri | 3:42 |
| 4. | "Dare (La La La)" | Shakira; Jay Singh; Lukasz Gottwald; Mathieu Jomphe-Lepine; Max Martin; Henry Walter; Raelene Arreguin; John J. Conte, Jr. | Dr. Luke; Shakira; J2; Cirkut; Billboard | 3:08 |
| 5. | "Cut Me Deep" (featuring Magic!) | Atweh; Mark Pellizzer; Alex Tanas; Ben Spivak; Messinger; Shakira | Messinger; Nasri | 3:15 |
| 6. | "23" | Shakira; Luis Fernando Ochoa | Shakira; Busbee; Ochoa (add.) | 4:00 |
| 7. | "The One Thing" | Shakira; Atweh | Shakira; Messinger; Nasri | 3:12 |
| 8. | "Medicine" (featuring Blake Shelton) | Shakira; Hillary Lindsey; Mark Bright | Shakira; Busbee | 3:20 |
| 9. | "Spotlight" | Shakira; Lindsey; Bright | Shakira; Greg Kurstin | 3:23 |
| 10. | "Broken Record" | Shakira; Busbee | Shakira; Busbee | 3:14 |
| 11. | "Nunca Me Acuerdo de Olvidarte" | Shakira; Jorge Drexler; Hill; Hull; Alexander; Hassle | Shakira; Hill; Kid Harpoon | 3:28 |
| 12. | "Loca por Ti" | Shakira; Josep Bellavista; Carlos Hernandez; Juan Clapera; Alberto Herrera | Shakira; Ochoa | 3:41 |
| Total length: | | | | 41:40 |

Standard edition (digital version)
| No. | Title | Writer(s) | Producer(s) | Length |
|---|---|---|---|---|
| 1. | "Dare (La La La)" | Shakira; Singh; Gottwald; Jomphe-Lepine; Max Martin; Walter; Arreguin; Conte, Jr. | Dr. Luke; Shakira; J2; Cirkut; Billboard | 3:08 |
| 2. | "Can't Remember to Forget You" (featuring Rihanna) | Shakira; Hill; Hull; Alexander; Hassle; Fenty | Shakira; Hill; Kid Harpoon; Harrell (vocal) | 3:26 |
| 3. | "Empire" | Mac; Wroldsen | Mac; Shakira | 3:59 |
| 4. | "You Don't Care About Me" | Atweh; Messinger; Chantal Kreviazuk | Shakira; Messinger; Nasri | 3:41 |
| 5. | "Cut Me Deep" (featuring Magic!) | Atweh; Pellizzer; Tanas; Spivak; Messinger; Shakira | Messinger; Nasri | 3:15 |
| 6. | "Spotlight" | Shakira; Lindsey; Bright | Shakira; Kurstin | 3:23 |
| 7. | "Broken Record" | Shakira; Busbee | Shakira; Busbee | 3:14 |
| 8. | "Medicine" (featuring Blake Shelton) | Shakira; Lindsey; Bright | Shakira; Busbee | 3:18 |
| 9. | "23" | Shakira; Ochoa | Shakira; Busbee; Ochoa (add.) | 3:59 |
| 10. | "The One Thing" | Shakira; Atweh | Shakira; Messinger; Nasri | 3:12 |
| 11. | "Nunca Me Acuerdo de Olvidarte" | Shakira; Drexler; Hill; Hull; Alexander; Hassle | Shakira; Hill; Kid Harpoon | 3:26 |
| 12. | "Loca por Ti" | Shakira; Bellavista; Hernandez; Clapera; Herrera | Shakira; Ochoa | 3:41 |
| Total length: | | | | 41:40 |

Deluxe edition
| No. | Title | Writer(s) | Producer(s) | Length |
|---|---|---|---|---|
| 13. | "La La La" | Shakira; Singh; Gottwald; Jomphe-Lepine; Max Martin; Walter; Arreguin; Conte, Jr. | Dr. Luke; Shakira; J2; Cirkut; Billboard | 3:06 |
| 14. | "Chasing Shadows" | Sia Furler; Fernando Garibay; Kurstin | Fernando Garibay; Kurstin | 3:31 |
| 15. | "That Way" | Shakira; Olivia Waithe; Roy "Battleroy" Battle | Shakira; Roy "Battleroy" Battle | 3:08 |
| Total length: | | | | 51:25 |

International physical deluxe edition
| No. | Title | Length |
|---|---|---|
| 13. | "La La La (Brazil 2014)" (featuring Carlinhos Brown) | 3:19 |
| 14. | "Chasing Shadows" | 3:31 |
| 15. | "That Way" | 3:08 |
| Total length: | | 53:36 |

2024 expanded edition
| No. | Title | Length |
|---|---|---|
| 16. | "La La La (Brazil 2014)" (English version) (featuring Carlinhos Brown) | 3:19 |
| 17. | "La La La (Brasil 2014)" (Spanish version) (featuring Carlinhos Brown) | 3:19 |
| Total length: | | 58:03 |

Japanese edition
| No. | Title | Length |
|---|---|---|
| 16. | "Can't Remember to Forget You" (Tokyo Ska Paradise Orchestra Club Mix) (featuring Rihanna) | 3:34 |
| Total length: | | 54:59 |

Latin America and Spain deluxe edition
| No. | Title | Length |
|---|---|---|
| 1. | "Nunca Me Acuerdo de Olvidarte" | 3:26 |
| 2. | "Empire" | 3:59 |
| 3. | "You Don't Care About Me" | 3:41 |
| 4. | "La La La" | 3:06 |
| 5. | "Cut Me Deep" (featuring Magic!) | 3:15 |
| 6. | "23" | 3:59 |
| 7. | "The One Thing" | 3:12 |
| 8. | "Medicine" (featuring Blake Shelton) | 3:18 |
| 9. | "Loca por ti" | 3:41 |
| 10. | "Spotlight" | 3:23 |
| 11. | "Broken Record" | 3:14 |
| 12. | "Boig per Tu" | 3:44 |
| 13. | "La La La (Brasil 2014)" (featuring Carlinhos Brown) | 3:17 |
| 14. | "Chasing Shadows" | 3:31 |
| 15. | "Can't Remember to Forget You" (featuring Rihanna) | 3:26 |
| Total length: | | 52:12 |

Latin America and Spain physical deluxe edition
| No. | Title | Length |
|---|---|---|
| 1. | "Nunca Me Acuerdo de Olvidarte" | 3:26 |
| 2. | "Empire" | 3:59 |
| 3. | "You Don't Care About Me" | 3:41 |
| 4. | "La La La" | 3:06 |
| 5. | "23" | 3:59 |
| 6. | "The One Thing" | 3:12 |
| 7. | "Medicine" (featuring Blake Shelton) | 3:18 |
| 8. | "Loca por Ti" | 3:41 |
| 9. | "Spotlight" | 3:23 |
| 10. | "Broken Record" | 3:14 |
| 11. | "Boig per Tu" | 3:44 |
| 12. | "Can't Remember to Forget You" (featuring Rihanna) | 3:26 |
| 13. | "La La La (Brasil 2014)" (featuring Carlinhos Brown) | 3:17 |
| 14. | "Chasing Shadows" | 3:31 |
| 15. | "Cut Me Deep" (featuring Magic!) | 3:15 |
| Total length: | | 52:12 |

=== Notes ===
- The standard editions of Shakira include the same twelve tracks, although they are ordered differently on the physical and digital versions.

== Credits and personnel ==
Credits were adapted from the liner notes and Allmusic.

=== Recording locations ===
- Estudios Estopa (Barcelona, Spain)
- Harpoon Club House (London, England)
- Sonora Recorders (Los Angeles, CA)
- Westlake Recording Studios (Los Angeles, CA)
- Mesk Studios (Cairo, Egypt)
- The Ox (Hollywood, CA)
- Cia dos Tecnicos (Rio de Janeiro, Brazil)
- Estudio Avioes do Forro (Fortaleza, Brazil)
- Groove Studios (Salvador, Brazil)
- Swing House Studios (Los Angeles, CA)
- Ocean Way Nashville (Nashville, TN)
- Echo Studios (Los Angeles, CA)
- Platinum Sound Studios (New York, NY)
- Record Plant (Los Angeles, CA)
- Luke's in the Boo (Malibu, CA)

=== Personnel ===
- Josep Baiges – assistant engineer
- Jeff Balding – engineering
- Anye Bao – drums
- Roland Barthes – quotation author
- Billboard – instrumentation, production, programming
- Delbert Bowers – assistant, mixing assistant
- Carlinhos Brown – percussion arrangement
- Busbee – bass, acoustic guitar, production, programming, string arrangements
- Mateo Camargo – engineering, keyboards
- Cirkut – instrumentation, production, programming
- Dave Clauss – drum engineering, engineering, guitar, mixing, mixing engineering, programming
- Rob Cohen – assistant, assistant engineering, mixing assistant
- Joel Condal – assistant, mixing Assistant
- Dr. Luke – guitar, instrumentation, production, programming
- Nadine Eliya – project supervisor
- Rachael Findlen – assistant
- Jordi Fontanals – hair stylist, make-up
- Jake Gable – assistant
- Chris Galland – assistant, mixing assistant
- Paul Gendler – guitar
- Clint Gibbs – assistant engineering, engineering
- Erwin Gorostiza – creative director
- Mariel Haenn – stylist
- Kuk Harrell – vocal production
- John Hill – bass, drums, guitar, keyboards, production, programming
- The Hossam Ramzy String Orchestra – strings
- Ghazi Hourani – assistant
- Victor Indrizzo – drums
- J2 – instrumentation, production, programming
- Kid Harpoon – drums, guitar, keyboards, production
- Chantal Kreviazuk – background vocals
- Greg Kurstin – bass, drums, engineering, guitar, keyboards, production, programming
- David Levita – guitar, acoustic guitar, electric guitar
- Nicole Levy – marketing
- Alexandre Lins – choir production, engineering
- Federico Lorusso – piano
- Steve Lu – production, string arrangements
- Steve Mac – production, string arrangements, vocal production
- Magic! – featured artist
- Stephen Marcussen – mastering
- Manny Marroquin – mixing
- Sam Martin – drum engineering
- Maria P. Marulanda – design
- Lester Mendez – programming
- Adam Messinger – engineering, guitar, instrumentation, mixing, production, programming
- Nasri – instrumentation, production, programming, background vocals
- Justin Niebank – mixing
- Luis Fernando Ochoa – additional production, bass, guitar, production
- Alex Pasco – engineering
- Mark Pellizzer – guitar
- Lance Powell – assistant, mixing assistant
- Dann Pursey – engineering
- Hossam Ramzy – conducting, production
- Irene Richter – production coordination
- Rihanna – vocals
- David Rodriguez – assistant, mixing assistant
- Stephen Rusch – assistant engineering
- Alejandro Serrano – flugelhorn, trumpet
- Shakira – vocals, production, cajon, horn arrangements, percussion arrangement, string arrangements
- Blake Shelton – vocals
- Laura Sisk – engineering
- Gerges Sobhy – string engineering
- Ben Spivak – bass
- Aaron Sterling – drums
- Chris Stevens – programming
- Alex Tanas – drums
- Pablo Uribe Trujillo – guitar, mandolin
- David Cardenas Vasquez – engineering, keyboards
- Derek Wells – banjo, acoustic guitar, electric guitar, mandolin
- Ina Wroldsen – background vocals
- Rob Zangardi – stylist

== Charts ==
=== Weekly charts ===
Weekly chart performance for Shakira
| Chart (2014) | Peak position |
|---|---|
| Argentine Albums (CAPIF) | 6 |
| Australian Albums (ARIA) | 8 |
| Austrian Albums (Ö3 Austria) | 3 |
| Belgian Albums (Ultratop Flanders) | 11 |
| Belgian Albums (Ultratop Wallonia) | 11 |
| Brazilian Albums (Billboard) | 2 |
| Canadian Albums (Billboard) | 3 |
| Czech Albums (ČNS IFPI) | 17 |
| Croatian International Albums (HDU)ERROR in "Croatia": Missing parameters: id. | 8 |
| Danish Albums (Hitlisten) | 18 |
| Dutch Albums (Album Top 100) | 15 |
| Finnish Albums (Suomen virallinen lista) | 7 |
| French Albums (SNEP) | 6 |
| German Albums (Offizielle Top 100) | 5 |
| Greek Albums (IFPI) | 1 |
| Hungarian Albums (MAHASZ) | 12 |
| Irish Albums (IRMA) | 10 |
| Italian Albums (FIMI) | 3 |
| Japanese Albums (Oricon) | 50 |
| Mexican Albums (AMPROFON) | 2 |
| New Zealand Albums (RMNZ) | 17 |
| Norwegian Albums (VG-lista) | 10 |
| Polish Albums (ZPAV) | 4 |
| Portuguese Albums (AFP) | 6 |
| Scottish Albums (Official Charts) | 16 |
| Spanish Albums (Promusicae) | 2 |
| Swedish Albums (Sverigetopplistan) | 14 |
| Swiss Albums (Schweizer Hitparade) | 2 |
| UK Albums (Official Charts) | 14 |
| US Billboard 200 | 2 |

=== Year-end charts ===
2014 year-end chart performance for Shakira
| Chart (2014) | Position |
|---|---|
| Belgian Albums (Ultratop Flanders) | 114 |
| Belgian Albums (Ultratop Wallonia) | 80 |
| French Albums (SNEP) | 100 |
| Italian Albums (FIMI) | 96 |
| Mexican Albums (AMPROFON) | 38 |
| Swiss Albums (Schweizer Hitparade) | 67 |
| US Billboard 200 | 75 |

== Certifications and sales ==
Certifications and sales for Shakira
| Region | Certification | Certified units/sales |
|---|---|---|
| Brazil (Pro-Música Brasil) Digital and Physical Versions | Platinum | 40,000^{‡} |
| Brazil (Pro-Música Brasil) Streaming | Gold | 20,000^{‡} |
| Chile | Gold | |
| Colombia Physical sales | Platinum | |
| Colombia Digital stream | Gold | |
| France (SNEP) | Gold | 50,000^{*} |
| Mexico (AMPROFON) | Platinum | 60,000^{‡} |
| Poland (ZPAV) | Platinum | 20,000^{*} |
| Spain (Promusicae) | Gold | 20,000^{^} |
| United Kingdom | — | 38,975 |
| United States | — | 114,000 |
^{*} Sales figures based on certification alone.^{^} Shipments figures based on certification alone.^{‡} Sales+streaming figures based on certification alone.

== Release history ==
Release history and formats for Shakira
| Country | Date | Version | Format | Label | Ref. |
|---|---|---|---|---|---|
| Germany | 21 March 2014 | Standard; deluxe | CD; digital download | Sony Music Germany | |
| United Kingdom | 24 March 2014 | Standard; deluxe | CD; digital download | RCA Records UK | |
| Mexico | 24 March 2014 | Standard; deluxe | CD; digital download | Sony Music Mexico | |
| Colombia | 25 March 2014 | Standard; deluxe | CD; digital download | Sony Music Mexico | |
| Various | 25 March 2014 | Standard; deluxe | CD; digital download | RCA Records | |

== See also ==
- 2014 in American music
- List of best-selling albums in Colombia
