= Empire (Shakira song) =

Single by Shakira

from the album Shakira
- Released: 22 February 2014
- Recorded: 2013
- Studio: Mesk Studios (Cairo, Egypt)
- Genre: Rock
- Length: 3:59
- Label: RCA
- Songwriters: Steve Mac; Ina Wroldsen
- Producers: Steve Mac; Shakira

Shakira singles chronology
"Can't Remember to Forget You" (2014)	"Empire" (2014)	"Dare (La La La)" (2014)

Music video
- "Empire" on YouTube

"Empire" is a song recorded by Colombian singer-songwriter Shakira for her self-titled tenth studio album, Shakira (2014). It was written by Steve Mac and Ina Wroldsen, while production was handled by Mac and Shakira. The song was released as the second single from the album on 22 February 2014. "Empire" is a downtempo rock ballad about finding a love so powerful their empire could make "the world unite". Her vocals on the track were compared to those of Tori Amos, Jewel, Joni Mitchell and Alanis Morissette.

Upon its release, "Empire" was acclaimed by music critics, who commended the singer for getting back to her rock roots. The song reached the top ten in Lebanon and charted moderately in countries like France, South Korea and Spain. In the United States, it peaked at number 58 on the Billboard Hot 100 chart. The song's accompanying video was released on 25 March 2014 and portrays Shakira playing a runaway bride unharmed by fire and on the side of the Montserrat mountain, near Barcelona. Shakira performed the song in a number of places, including The Voice (both U.S. and UK), Billboard Music Awards, The Tonight Show Starring Jimmy Fallon, iHeartRadio Music Awards and others.

== Background and release ==
After the success of her ninth studio album, Sale el Sol, in 2010, Shakira revealed in November 2011, "I've begun to explore in the recording studio whenever I have time in Barcelona and here in Miami. I'm working with different producers and DJs, and I try to feed off from that and find new sources of inspiration and new musical motivation. I'm anxious to return to the studio. My body is asking for it." In 2012, it was reported that Shakira was shooting the video for the tentative-first single "Truth or Dare" in Lisbon, Portugal. However, due to Shakira's pregnancy, the song was not released. Later, in March 2014, Shakira explained to Billboard that, "It's been two-and-a-half years of making songs, trashing them, doing them again, doing eight versions of each song, having a baby, doing The Voice, coming back to the studio, reconnecting with my songs".

In December 2013, Sony Music Entertainment reported that Shakira's new single would be released in January 2014, and that it was supposed to be a duet with Barbadian recording artist Rihanna. On 13 January 2014, "Can't Remember to Forget You" was released and indeed featured Rihanna. On 24 February 2014, Popjustice announced that "Empire" would be the album's second single. The cover art features Shakira in a white strapless dress and hair pulled back. Shakira also premiered the track on Vevo on the same day, and it was offered as a free download with a pre-order of Shakira. Shakira's official Facebook page announced it as the second single from the album.

== Composition ==
"Empire" was written by British songwriter Steve Mac and Norwegian Ina Wroldsen, while Mac produced the song. "Empire" is a rock ballad, beginning in acoustic mode with a sparse intro before Shakira unleashes her "inner head-banger" and "howls her way" through the chorus, according to Idolator's Mike Wass. Lyrically, "Empire" talks about a bursting passion that the singer simply cannot express in words.

Billboard's Leila Cobo points out that "Empire" sounds a little like a Tori Amos song, writing that, "the fragility in Shakira's voice, the background strings and captivating hook are all eerily reminiscent of Amos's Little Earthquakes." Maggie Pannacione of Artistdirect compared the song to the works of Joni Mitchell and Alanis Morissette, but "in the Shakira Latina way."

The song is written in the key of both C minor and C major at a tempo of 80 beats per minute, following a chord progression of C-Fm/Ab-Bb

== Critical reception ==
"Empire" was critically acclaimed, with most critics praising the singer for getting back to her rock roots. Leila Cobo of Billboard called the track "a gorgeous rock ballad that harks back to Shakira's earliest work." Jason Lipshut also of Billboard called it a "downtempo, downright emo track". Jazz Tangcay of So So Gay named it a "thumping ballad" that "takes a few listens but it seems rock guitar and a thumping sound is the direction Shakira is going with her forthcoming self-titled album." Mike Wass of Idolator wrote that 'Empire' "is her rowdiest rock adventure by far".

Emily Mackay of Digital Spy described the track as "a more mature, classic, piano-led sort of pop with a star-gazing, philosophical rush", with "a cosmic-orgasmic chorus". Maggie Pannacione of ArtistDirect simply called it "flawless and unique", while Jamieson Cox of Time magazine complimented the track for having "Bond-theme grandeur and a spotlight on Shakira's rich, soaring vocals", noting that, "If you're going to give your single an imperial moniker, it'd better come with tons of space and an explosive climax; Shakira delivers on both counts."

== Music video ==
On 10 March, Shakira posted to her social media pictures of herself shooting the video for "Empire". The pictures find the singer wearing a white wedding dress. On 13 March 2014, a lyric video was uploaded to her YouTube account. Mike Wass of Idolator called it "a beautifully shot nature documentary with a rather incredible soundtrack." He went on to describe the lyric video, stating that, "The visual feast features slow motion photography of seeds sprouting and flowers blooming — an exceedingly good fit for the Colombian's kooky lyrics about stars making love to the universe."

The official music video was released on 25 March 2014, directed by Darren Craig, Jonathan Craven and Jeff Nicholas from the Uprising Creative. In the video, Shakira emerges as a beautiful bride in white about to walk down the aisle in a flower-decked church. But in a dreamy twist, Shakira has a change of heart and is seen picking up her skirts and running away across a green sunlit field. Later, she's seen standing on the church steps with her ruffled train catching fire.

The Empire music video filmed in the city of Esparreguera (Spain), near an abandoned suburb.

== Live performances ==
On 25 March 2014, Shakira held an iHeartRadio album release party which was presented by Target, live from the iHeartRadio Theater Los Angeles. During the release party, Shakira performed four songs from the album, which included "Empire". The following day, Shakira performed the song, during a promotional interview with Jimmy Fallon on The Tonight Show Starring Jimmy Fallon. The same day, Shakira performed "Hips Don't Lie" and "Empire" during a live set on The Today Show at the Rockerfella stadium. On 29 March 2014, Shakira performed "Empire" live on The Voice UK. On 22 April 2014, she performed the song on The Voice, on which she is a judge. On 1 May 2014, she performed the song at the first annual iHeartRadio Music Awards. On 10 May 2014, she performed the song at the Wango Tango. On 18 May 2014, she performed at the Billboard Music Awards.

The song was performed by Shakira during the Super Bowl LIV halftime show.

== Charts ==
=== Weekly charts ===
Chart (2014)	Peak position
Belgium (Ultratip Bubbling Under Wallonia)	15
CIS Airplay (TopHit)	170
Canada Hot 100 (Billboard)	92
France (SNEP)	82
Hungary (Rádiós Top 40)	17
Ireland (IRMA)	60
Lebanon (The Official Lebanese Top 20)	8
Mexico (Billboard Mexican Espanol Airplay)	37
Scotland Singles (OCC)	21
Slovakia Airplay (ČNS IFPI)	55
South Korea (Gaon International Digital Chart)	97
Spain (PROMUSICAE)	29
UK Singles (OCC)	25
US Billboard Hot 100	58
US Pop Airplay (Billboard)	26

=== Year-end charts ===
Chart (2014)	Position
Hungary (Rádiós Top 40)	86

== Certifications ==
Region	Certification	Certified units/sales
Brazil (Pro-Música Brasil)	Gold	30,000^{‡}
Canada (Music Canada)	Gold	40,000^{‡}
Mexico (AMPROFON)	Gold	30,000^{‡}
United States (RIAA)	Platinum	1,000,000^{‡}
^{‡} Sales+streaming figures based on certification alone.

== Release history ==
Country	Date	Format	Label
Austria	22 February 2014	Digital download	Sony
Belgium	22 February 2014	Digital download	Sony
Canada	22 February 2014	Digital download	Sony
Finland	22 February 2014	Digital download	Sony
France	22 February 2014	Digital download	Sony
Germany	22 February 2014	Digital download	Sony
Ireland	22 February 2014	Digital download	Sony
Italy	22 February 2014	Digital download	Sony
Luxembourg	22 February 2014	Digital download	Sony
Netherlands	22 February 2014	Digital download	Sony
Norway	22 February 2014	Digital download	Sony
Portugal	22 February 2014	Digital download	Sony
Spain	22 February 2014	Digital download	Sony
Sweden	22 February 2014	Digital download	Sony
Switzerland	22 February 2014	Digital download	Sony
United States	25 February 2014	Digital download	RCA; Sony Latin Iberia
New Zealand	26 February 2014	Digital download	Sony
United States	22 April 2014	Hot AC radio	RCA; Sony Latin Iberia
Germany	28 November 2014	CD single	Sony
