= 23 (Shakira song) =

2014 song by Shakira

Song by Shakira

from the album Shakira
- Recorded: 2013
- Studio: Estopa Estudios (Sant Feliu de Llobregat)
- Genre: Pop rock, country, folk
- Length: 4:00
- Label: Ace; RCA
- Songwriter(s): Shakira; Luis Fernando Ochoa
- Producer(s): Shakira; Busbee; Ochoa

"23" is a song recorded by Colombian songwriter Shakira for her eponymous album (2014). It was written by Shakira and Luis Fernando Ochoa and produced by Busbee and Shakira together with Ochoa. "23" is a pop rock song with country and folk influences. The song received generally positive reviews from music critics. The song is written about Shakira's relationship with her then-boyfriend Gerard Piqué.

== Background and composition ==
"Since Milan was born, I have been in the happiest moment of my life, the most complete. I dedicated '23' to Gerard because that is the age he was when I met him, he was 23 and I was 33".

—Shakira for Primer Impacto.

In November 2012, Shakira revealed in an interview with Billboard magazine that she had begun writing new material and working with various producers for a new record. The following year, she ended her recording contract with Epic Records and signed under Roc Nation for management purposes. In December 2013, it was announced that Shakira had signed a recording contract with RCA Records, under which the record would be released. On March 21, 2014, the album was released under the eponymous title Shakira. "This album is very close to my heart and reflects a stage in my life", commented Shakira on the album's content.

"23" was written by Shakira together with Luis Fernando Ochoa. The song was produced by Busbee and Shakira, while Luis Fernando Ochoa provided additional production. "23" was recorded at Estopa Estudios in Sant Feliu de Llobregat, Barcelona by Dave Clauss and Eric Eylands served as engineering assistant. Also Clauss mixed the song at Grabaciones Silvestres in Sant Quirze Safaja, Barcelona and Joel Condal who served as mixing assistant. Busbee provided the programming and the bass, David Levita provided the guitar while Alejandro Serrano the flugelhorn. The song also had the participation by Shakira's son Milan who provided the backing vocals. Milan was in the studio as Shakira recorded the song, and his laughter can be heard at the end. "I put a pair of headphones on him and he was listening really intently and after I finished the last little bit of the song ... he goes 'muau' and he just stayed there on the final recording, just like it happened. It was very emotional, it brought tears to my eyes," Shakira emphasized on the recording process.

Lyrically, "23" honors Shakira's relationship with Piqué and reflects on his impact on her life. In the song, she reflects on the moment she first met Piqué, expressing that she felt an immediate connection between them and that fate played a role in bringing them together when he was just 23. Shakira commented that it's "one of the most personal songs" she has ever written.

== Critical reception ==
Direct Lyrics review the song positively by saying it was "Without a doubt Shakira's most-personal song on the album". Leila Cobo at the Billboard said that the song is "The overall effect is one of innocence and vulnerability". At Sputnikmusic, Brendan Schroer review the instrumentation of the song like an "Shakira's highly honest and reflective performances". Elysa Gardner of USA Today defines the song as "a gently blissed-out track" and praised the fact that Shakira credited her son Milan as the "youngest background vocalist in the world!". At The New York Times' Jon Pareles said that "23" shows "her professions of love sound both innocent and obsessive, and the idiosyncrasies of her English lyrics". David Ferrell at PopMatters concludes that "motherhood seems to have brought out Shakira’s soft side on the charming "23"". Silvio Essinger from O Globo commented that the song is written "with just the right amount of sugar and affection."

== Live performances ==
Shakira first performed "23" at the album launch parties in Barcelona on 20 March 2014, and at the iHeartRadio Theater in Burbank, California on 24 March 2014. On 10 May 2014, Shakira performed the song alongside other songs at the Wango Tango concert in Los Angeles, as she did on 10 July, when she performed it on Fantástico at the TV Globo studios in Jardim Botânico, Rio de Janeiro. She also performed the song at Al Rojo Vivo in Miami, Florida on 12 June 2014.

== Credits and personnel ==
Recording and mixing

- Recorded at Estopa Estudios, Sant Feliu de Llobregat, Barcelona, Spain; mixed at Grabaciones Silvestres, Sant Quirze Safaja, Barcelona.

Personnel

- Songwriting – Shakira, Luis Fernando Ochoa
- Production – Shakira, Busbee
- Additional production – Luis Fernando Ochoa
- Recording - Dave Clauss
- Mixing – Dave Clauss
- Mixing assistant – Joel Condal
- Programming – Busbee

Credits adapted from the liner notes of Shakira, RCA Records, Sony Music Latin.
