= Boig per Tu =

2014 song by Shakira

"Boig per Tu" / "Loca por Ti"

Song by Shakira

from the album Shakira
- Recorded: 2014
- Studio: Estudios Estopa (Barcelona, Spain)
- Genre: Rock
- Length: 3:44 (Boig per Tu); 3:41 (Loca por Ti)
- Label: RCA
- Songwriters: Alberto Herrera; Carlos Hernandez; Josep Bellavista; Juan Clapera; Shakira
- Producers: Shakira; Luis Fernando Ochoa

Live video
- "Boig per Tu" on YouTube

"Boig per Tu" (English: "Mad about You") is a song recorded by Colombian singer-songwriter Shakira from her self-titled tenth studio album Shakira (2014). Featured on the album is also a version of the song in Spanish titled "Loca por Ti". The song is a rework of Catalan rock band Sau's similarly titled song from 1990. Despite not being released as a single, "Boig per Tu" debuted atop of the songs chart in Spain.

== Background and release ==
"Boig per Tu" is a rock ballad sang in Catalan that was initially released by the Catalan rock band Sau as a single from their third studio album "Quina nit" in 1990. In November 2010, shortly after she started dating Catalan football player Gerard Piqué, Shakira stated to the press that she is learning Catalan language and would "love to sing 'Boig per Tu'" one day.

In 2014, Shakira announced that she has recorded "Boig per Tu" and that it will be on her new album Shakira, an album that she described as being "close to her heart" and "reflecting a stage in her life". Featured on the album is also "Loca por Ti", a Spanish version of the song. After recording the song, she played it as a surprise to Piqué, who fell in love with it and who made the decision to have it included on the album. Shakira characterized the song as an homage to the two most important Catalans of her life, Piqué and their son Milan. The song also acts as a tribute to the Catalan roots of her mother.

"Boig per Tu" is a rock ballad that features completely reworked lyrics compared to the original by Sau. The lyrics describe much Shakira loves Piqué, being "crazy in love and drinking in celebration to that love". The song was produced by Shakira and her long-time collaborator Luis Fernando Ochoa and features guitar as the only instrument. Shakira stated that a friend of hers helped with her accent when recording in Catalan.

Shakira performed "Boig per Tu" live on the second Barcelona date of the El Dorado World Tour. She dedicated the performance to her in-laws at the time. The performance was recorded so that her partially Catalan mother can see it, and it was uploaded to Shakira's YouTube account.

== Reception and commercial performance ==
In an album review, Leila Cobo from Billboard commented "Loca por Ti" to be "the ultimate homage to Piqué", stating that the version in Catalan, "Boig per Tu", is a favorite song of his. Josh Haggis from Attitude described "Loca por Ti" as a sweet song with a lovely melody, despite not knowing Spanish to comment on the lyrics. Mike Wass from Idolator characterized the song as a "serene, breezy guitar ballad" that is "an absolute winner". Amandine Dayre from SensCritique described "Loca por Ti" as one of the most touching tracks on the album. Rania Aniftos from Neon Tommy stated that the song is sonically similar to Shakira's 2010 single "Gypsy", and noted that "the sensuality and emotion in her voice" can be felt by people who don't speak Spanish, and that the song is a "perfect ending to an overall romantic record".

Shakira recording a song in Catalan resulted in her being attacked on Twitter. Shakira replied to the claims stating that "as a foreigner, she can't be categorical about the Catalan topic". Additionally, she was accused of "abandoning her roots", despite her herself having Catalan ancestry from her mother's side.

After the album Shakira was released, "Boig per Tu" became the top-selling song in Spain for week. The song debuted atop of the songs chart in Spain and spent six weeks on the chart. The song's success in Spain was dubbed as a demonstration of Shakira's power of "building bridges of understanding between rivals" with her music.

== Charts ==
=== Weekly charts ===
Weekly chart performance for "Boig per Tu"
Chart (2014)	Peak position
Spain (Promusicae)	1

Weekly chart performance for "Loca por Ti"
Chart (2014)	Peak position
US Latin Digital Songs (Billboard)	19

=== Year-end charts ===
Year-end chart performance for "Boig Per Tu"
Chart (2014)	Position
Spain (PROMUSICAE)	34
