= Toneladas (song) =

2017 song by Shakira

Song by Shakira

from the album El Dorado
- Recorded: 2016–2017
- Genre: Latin pop; ballad
- Length: 3:12
- Label: Sony Latin
- Songwriters: Shakira; Luis Fernando Ochoa
- Producers: Shakira; A.C.

Audio video
- "Toneladas" on YouTube

"Toneladas" (English: "Tonnes") is a piano ballad by Colombian singer-songwriter Shakira, taken from her eleventh studio album, El Dorado (2017). The lyrics are written by Shakira, and the song is composed by Shakira and Luis Fernando Ochoa, and produced by Shakira with A.C. as an additional producer.

== Background ==
"Toneladas" was first teased on 16 May 2017 via a game where fans were able to unlock exclusive material from Shakira's eleventh studio album El Dorado. On 17 May, Shakira shared a preview clip of the song on YouTube. The preview video got over a million views in less than 24 hours from its release. Based on the preview alone, Yare Grau from CiberCuba predicted that the song "will surely become the favorite for many of the singer's followers".

"Toneladas" is a piano ballad, and only the second song of the album that Shakira started to work on after "La Bicicleta". It was released alongside the album El Dorado on 26 May 2017 and is the closing track on the album. Lyrically the song is about Shakira being happy with "toneladas masivas de amor”" ("massive tons of love"). Shakira commented on the lyrics that she "can handle hyperboles" and that she "is exaggerated from head to toe" and has "no choice not to be".

According to Shakira, "Toneladas" is the favorite song of her son Milan on the album. Shakira explained that the song went through various iterations, including reggae, rock, and pop versions, before she decided on a simple arrangement with only piano accompaniment: "this song can only exist on piano and voice", she explained.

== Live performances ==
"Toneladas" was first performed live by Shakira at a surprise pop-up show at The Wynwood Yard in Miami on 27 May, where she performed two songs, "Toneladas" and "Me Enamoré". She performed it also during the El Dorado album launch party at the Convent del Ángels in Barcelona on 9 June, where she dedicated the song to her eldest son Milan.

"Toneladas" was the third last song overall and the first encore track on the El Dorado World Tour setlist. During the performances of the song, Shakira climbed onto a makeshift platform at the back of the audience, and performed "Toneladas" together with the crowd while being close to them. After taking off her golden dress worn exclusively for the song, she walked back to the main stage through a corridor of fans, stopping for hugs and pictures along the way. The live performance of the song filmed during the tour dates in Los Angeles is featured on the live album Shakira in Concert: El Dorado World Tour as the 18th track.

== Reception ==
Stephanie Penman from We Plug GOOD Music emphasized that "Toneladas" is "heavenly elegant in every way", "a song that is there to fully appreciate the majestic and compelling vocal of Shakira", explaining how the "vulnerable song [...] oozes emotion" and "is one to put on repeat when you need an element of pure class in your life". Albert Domènech from La Vanguardia described the song as a "heartfelt love ballad sung to the company of a piano", noting how Shakira "leaves behind the most danceable side of hers to play with the emotions and the most sentimental part of hers", and praised the song calling it "one of those perfect songs to dedicate to the people you love with a positive message". Rodrigo Rojas from La Voz del Interior characterized "Toneladas" as "that perfect piano ballad to dedicate to everyone you love", portraying how on the song "the weight of love collapses on Shakira". Si Hawkins form The National reflected on the piano ballad being "beautifully understated". Chuck Campbell from Knoxville News Sentinel encapsulated the song as a "gorgeous piano-based closer" and called it a highlight on the album.
