= Anna Kaiser =

American Personal Trainer

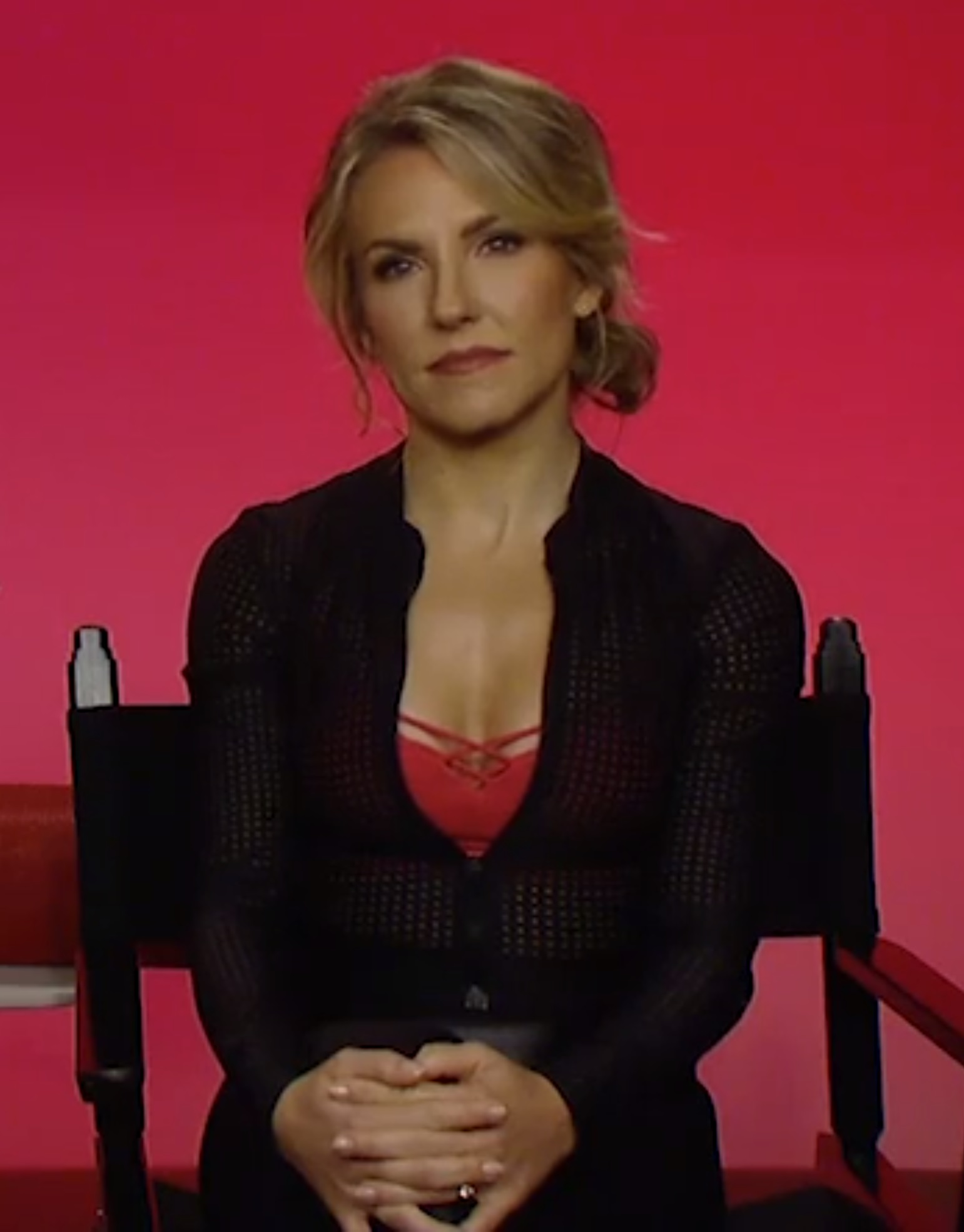
- Kaiser appears for the "More for MBC" initiative for metastatic breast cancer in 2018
- Born: Anna Kaiser; Calgary, Canada
- Occupation(s): Fitness professional Choreographer; Entrepreneur

Anna Kaiser is an American fitness professional, choreographer, and entrepreneur. She works as the personal trainer to Kelly Ripa, Shakira, Alicia Keys, and Sarah Jessica Parker and is the founder & CEO of Anna Kaiser Studios, which has locations in New York, Hamptons, and Connecticut.

== Career ==
Kaiser co-hosted the television show My Diet Is Better Than Yours and had a fashion line at Target in 2016.

In 2011, Kaiser started a fitness company, AKT InMotion, first operating studios in New York City, Connecticut, the Hamptons, and pop ups in Los Angeles. In 2018, Kaiser franchised this fitness concept. In 2020, Kaiser launched Anna Kaiser Studios.

== Personal life ==
Kaiser married Carlos Wesley in 2012, and they have two children.
