= AKT motos =

AKT Motos
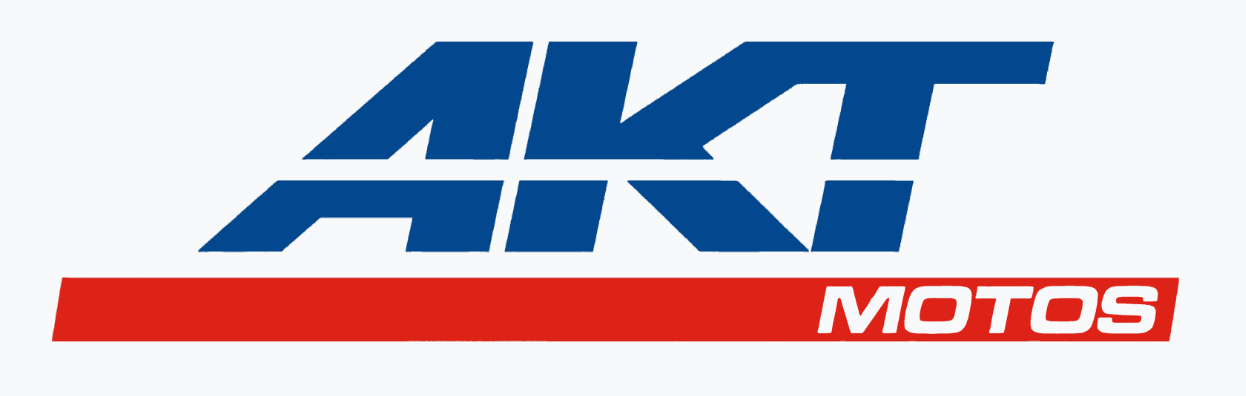

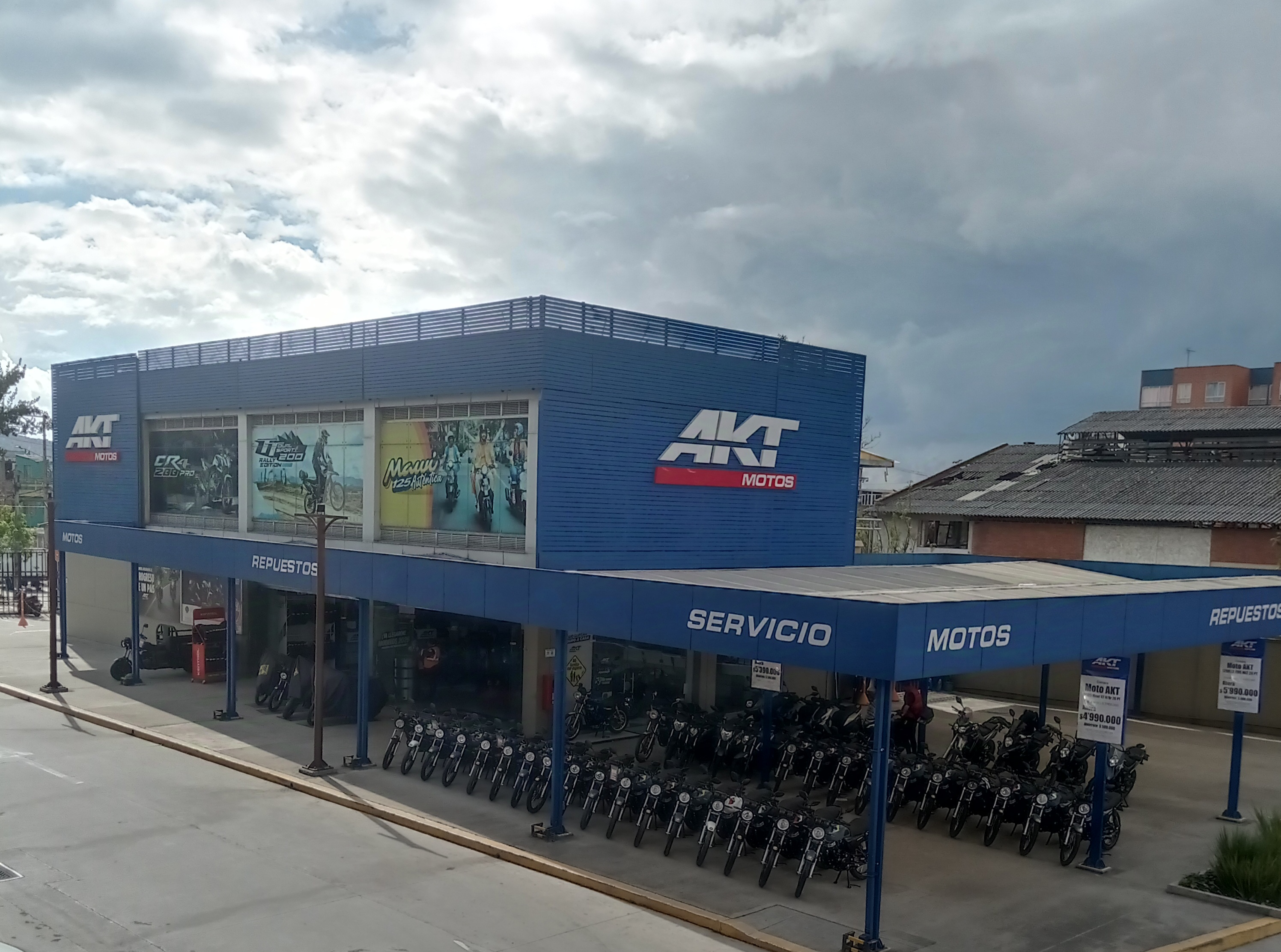
- Industry: Motorcycles; Quads
- Founded: Envigado, Colombia, 2004
- Website: www.aktmotos.com

AKT Motos (formerly Ensambladora Corbeta S. A.), is a Colombian company headquartered in Envigado, Antioquia, part of the Grupo Corbeta (Colombiana de Comercio S. A.), specialized in the manufacture and assembly of motorcycles and quads. It was established in 2004 by a group of Colombian businessmen.

== History ==
The Colombian motorcycle market had been dominated by Japanese, European, and regional (Brazil, Chile) manufacturers. Noting this, a group of Colombian businessmen formed an association on 16 April 2004 to purchase Chinese technology for motors, chassis, and economical designs.

== Present activities ==
In the seven years following their founding, AKT came to capture 15% of the Colombian market. As of 2012 it is one of the top five motorcycle brands in Colombia, and sold 80,000 motorbikes in 2011, of 510,000 sold nationwide.

AKT imports motorcycles from Chinese and Taiwanese factories such as Loncin Holdings, Qjiang Motors and SYM Motors as knock-down kits, then assembles them in a local Colombian factory.

In January 2012 AKT became a sponsor of the Colombian first division soccer team Santa Fe Corporación Deportiva.
