= Brian Lichtenberg =

American fashion designer

- Labels: Brian Lichtenberg; BLTEE

Brian Lichtenberg is an American fashion designer and founder-creator of the label Brian Lichtenberg, and the streetwear brand BLTEE.

== Career ==
Lichtenberg began designing in summer 2000. His clothes are sold through specialty boutiques and top department stores in Los Angeles, London, Paris and Milan.

In September 2013 he made his first New York Fashion Week presentation at Pier 59 for his Spring-Summer 2014 collection. His second presentation was held on 9 February 2014 at The Hub, in The Hudson Hotel.

=== Parody sportswear ===
In 2006, Lichtenberg designed the "BRIANEL No. 1" T-shirt, the first a line of T-shirts, sweatshirts and other sportswear garments bearing logos that parodied those of major established brands such as Chanel (Brianel), Balmain (Ballin), and Hermès (Homiès). They have been seen on celebrities such as Miley Cyrus.

In 2013, Lichtenberg designed a line of sweatshirts similar to American football jerseys for the Los-Angeles based boutique Kitson, but with the names of pharmaceutical drugs "Adderall", "Vicodin" and "Xanax" across the backs at shoulder level with a two-digit-number. They were advertised with the slogan "Pop one on and you'll feel better, just what the doctor ordered", and were criticised for trivializing prescription drug abuse and mental illness. The drug companies also threatened to sue unless the shirts were taken off the market, and the Partnership at Drugfree.org charity released a statement disassociating themselves from the line and refusing to accept any direct donations of funds raised through the shirt sales.

Lichtenberg released a statement saying:

I have created a collection of t-shirts that are a parody of pop culture. This particular collection of prescription tee's is simply a commentary on what I see happening in our society. Call it what you may, but art in all forms is created off of pop culture and the social situations that surround it. A large percentage of Americans are prescribed these drugs by doctors everyday for legitimate reasons . These are not illegal substances. These tee's are not meant to encourage prescription drug abuse, but if they open the door to a much needed dialogue, as they seem to be doing now, then mission accomplished.

=== Performance costumes ===
Lichtenberg has worked closely with a number of singers and rappers on their performance attire. Among his best known designs are Lady Gaga's crime scene tape outfit for the music video to Telephone, and Katy Perry's scuba-inspired 'Freakum' dress from 3OH!3's Starstrukk video. His hologrammatic leggings became a signature stage look for the rapper M.I.A. at the time of her successful 2007 song Paper Planes. At one point M.I.A. was wearing his designs almost exclusively. Other singers who have worked with him for their performance costumes include Beyoncé and Nicki Minaj, and he counts Kanye West, Peaches, Ciara, Yelle, Ke$ha and Keri Hilson among his clients. His more mainstream designs, including one-shouldered minidresses, have been worn by celebrities such as Shakira, Paris Hilton and Kim Kardashian.

== Lawsuit ==
In September 2013, Lichtenberg filed a US$100 million lawsuit in Federal Court in Los Angeles against his brother Christopher and other parties, alleging trademark infringement, unfair competition and defamation among other claims. In reporting on the lawsuit, Vanity Fair described Lichtenberg as "sort of like the Weird Al Yankovic of fashion designers".
