= Can't Remember to Forget You =

Single by Shakira featuring Rihanna

from the album Shakira
- Released: 13 January 2014
- Recorded: 2013
- Studio: Estudios Estopa (Barcelona, Spain); Harpoon Club House (London, England); Sonora Recorders (Los Angeles, CA); Westlake Recording Studios (Los Angeles, CA)
- Genre: New wave; reggae rock; pop rock
- Length: 3:26
- Label: RCA
- Songwriters: Shakira; John Hill; Tom Hull; Daniel Alexander; Erik Hassle; Robyn Fenty
- Producers: John Hill; Kid Harpoon; Shakira

Shakira singles chronology
"Dançando" (2013)	"Can't Remember to Forget You" (2014)	"Empire" (2014)

Rihanna singles chronology
"The Monster" (2013)	"Can't Remember to Forget You" (2014)	"FourFiveSeconds" (2015)

Music videos
- "Can't Remember to Forget You" on YouTube; "Nunca Me Acuerdo de Olvidarte" on YouTube

"Can't Remember to Forget You" is a song by Colombian singer Shakira featuring Barbadian singer Rihanna from the former's eponymous tenth studio album, Shakira. It was written by Shakira, John Hill, Tom "Kid Harpoon" Hull, Daniel Alexander, Erik Hassle, and Rihanna, while production was handled by the former three. The song was released as the lead single of the album on 13 January 2014 through RCA Records. A solo Spanish-language version of the song, entitled "Nunca Me Acuerdo de Olvidarte", was released on 24 January 2014 via Sony Music Latin.

The song is an uptempo track that fuses reggae, rock, and new wave pop. Lyrically the song revolves around forgetting someone who is bad even though you love the person. Upon its release, "Can't Remember to Forget You" was met with mixed reviews from critics; while critics praised the ska influences, they felt that the song overall was not memorable. Other critics noted similarities between the song and the music of the Police and Bruno Mars.

Commercially, the single fared very well, reaching number one in Greece and Lebanon and the top ten in twenty-seven additional countries. In the US, the song debuted on the Billboard Hot 100 at twenty-eight and later went on to peak at fifteen on the chart, becoming Shakira's highest-debuting track in the region until "Shakira: Bzrp Music Sessions, Vol. 53" in 2023. The track is certified Double Diamond in Brazil, five times Platinum in Norway, and Gold or Platinum in nine additional countries. The music video, which was shot in a Los Angeles mansion, was directed by Joseph Kahn and was premiered and uploaded to YouTube on 30 January 2014. The accompanying video featured both Shakira and Rihanna in revealing outfits, dancing, smoking cigars, and a "naked embrace". The video has more than one billion views on YouTube. The song was performed live for the first time on iHeartRadio.

== Background ==
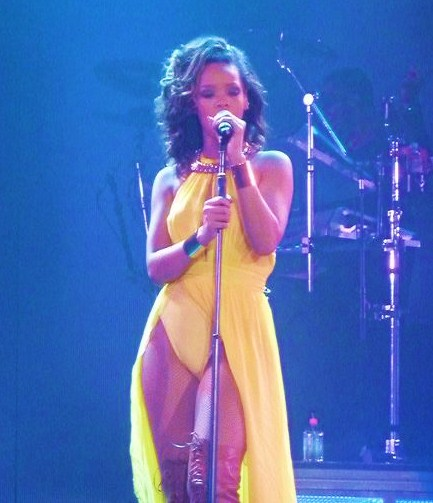
The song features guest vocals from Barbadian singer Rihanna.

In October 2010, Shakira released her ninth studio and Spanish-language album, Sale el Sol. The record marked a return to her musical roots after her experimentation with electronic music and was primarily a Latin pop album with influences of rock and merengue music. It garnered critical acclaim and was a commercial success internationally. A year later in November, Shakira revealed in an interview with Billboard magazine that she had begun writing new material and working with various producers for a new record. Shakira began planning to make new music in 2011: work continued into 2012, at which time she left her previous label Epic Records and joined RCA Records. Initially in 2012, it was expected that the first single from the singer's album would be a song titled "Truth or Dare". In June, Colombian newspaper El Heraldo reported that Shakira had been filming the music video for the song in Lisbon, Portugal, and speculated that it would be in late 2012. "Truth or Dare", however, was not released.

On 6 December 2013, a Twitter page named @ShakiraSpace announced the duet between Shakira and Rihanna. Then, on 8 December 2013, Shakira's body double Alexita Ortiz wrote on social networking site Twitter that she had been working with her on the set for a music video, and mentioned that Rihanna was also involved. The tweet was subsequently removed. The speculation regarding the collaboration of the two singers increased after Cuban-American rapper Pitbull, in a radio interview on Kidd Kraddick in the Morning, commented that Rihanna wasn't able to appear as the featured artist in his song "Timber" as she had "something she had to do with Shakira." Later, Sony Music announced that the first single would be in early 2014.

== Release and artwork ==
On 6 January 2014, the title of the song was revealed to be "Can't Remember to Forget You" and Rihanna confirmed that she would be contributing her vocals on the track. She also mentioned that it would be on 13 January 2014, although it was initially going to be one day later. The next day, Shakira also confirmed the date of the duet and posted a promotional cover. "Nunca Me Acuerdo de Olvidarte", the Spanish version, was on 21 January 2014, which does not feature Rihanna. A physical single in Germany is set to be out on 14 February 2014.

The actual artwork of the single was on 9 January 2014, and depicts Shakira wearing a black cut-out body piece with a gold and black medallion. Rihanna is seen lying on her lap, dressed in a strapless body suit and costume jewels. Jordana Ossad from E! Online called the duo "radiant and sultry" and complimented their pose. Two days before the release of the song, a "grainy" snippet of the recording in which Shakira could be heard singing the title of the song leaked online. On 13 January 2014, "Can't Remember to Forget You" was premiered on American syndicated radio program On Air with Ryan Seacrest. The audio of the song was also uploaded to Shakira's Vevo account and as of November 2019 has amassed over 1.0 billion views.

== Composition ==
"I'm going through a completely different experience right in relation to the song. The song is about that guy that just gets under your skin and you can't leave alone. I think every woman has been through that. This song is not exactly a reflection of my personal life right now."

— Shakira, explaining the lyrical meaning of the song

"Can't Remember to Forget You" is an uptempo track that incorporates elements of ska and reggae and has a length of three minutes and 28 seconds. The Guardian characterised the song as a "new wave pop" track containing a "guitar-tinged" beat. Rap-Up said the song is an "upbeat" track containing a "reggae-tinged" beat. The song opens with a "-slung, reggae-tinged verse", which The Guardian compared to the work of the Police, the song moves into a "guitar-heavy" chorus which contains "ska guitars and horns" and a "chunky rock arrangement". Complex described the song as a pop rock track.

"Can't Remember to Forget You" (2014)
A 20-second sample of the song featuring Rihanna and Shakira where the chorus of the song "I Can't Remember to Forget You" is heard.

Lyrically, the song concerns a man that Shakira cannot get off her mind, discussing how easy it is to forget how bad someone is for you when you still love them. The lyrics were noted by E! Online as describing a woman who will follow her man, the concept of the song is introduced in lyrics such as "keep(s) forgetting I should let you go/ But when you look at me/ The only memory is us kissing in the moonlight." Lewis Corner of Digital Spy commented on the lyric; "I keep forgetting I should let you go" as the singers telling their "no-good lothario, who seems to still have a hefty grip on their hearts," continuing to say the song's lyrics are "romantic pitfall." Musically, the song is written in the key of B minor, and set in common time signature with a moderately fast tempo of 138 beats per minute. It follows a chord progression of Bm-Em-A-D. Shakira and Rihanna's vocals span from the note of B_{3} to the high note of D_{5}.

== Critical reception ==
The song received mixed reviews from critics. MTV praised the song and complimented its "Latin and Island flourishes", continuing to compare the song to "Locked Out of Heaven" by Bruno Mars and Shakira's previous collaboration with Beyoncé "Beautiful Liar". The Guardian found its melodies catchy, and praised the song for keeping away from electronic dance music, noting Shakira's return to "guitar-tinged new wave pop". Vibe praised the duet calling it a "powerhouse collaboration", concluding, "The she-wolf and Bajan bombshell's chemistry seeps through the bass line and their accented vocals, sure to make both stanbases happy." Jason Lipshutz of Billboard noted the song as being "enjoyably grandiose", praising the "ska-punk guitar riff" and its "chunky rock arrangement."'PopjusticeSon gave the song a positive review saying, "You cannot go wrong with a bit of Shakira. You cannot go wrong with a bit of Rihanna. Two facts for you there ladies and gents."

Bradley Stern of MuuMuse felt the song was not consequential, despite praising the song as something different from contemporary radio. Despite saying that "elements" of the song "feel worldly and memorable", Lindsey Weber of Vulture called the song "ironically forgettable" due to Shakira's and Rihanna's vocal similarity and the "-tempo reggae-rock beat." Additionally, Gerrick D. Kennedy of the Los Angeles Times said the single "could use more steam", summarising with, "Here’s one thing about hype: It’s almost impossible to live up to." Claire Lobenfield of Complex wrote, "As evidenced by the title, it's a song about lingering heartache. But instead of making it a melancholic affair, the duet is full pop-rock a la Bruno Mars."

== Commercial performance ==
On its first day of the song had 1,172 spins on 143 stations, equating to an audience of 11 million. "Can't Remember To Forget You" debuted at number 28 on the Billboard Hot 100 chart and number 25 on Latin Pop Songs chart. The Spanish version debuted at number 11 on the Hot Latin Songs chart. With the song debuting at number 28 in on the US Billboard Hot 100 it became Shakira's highest-debuting track in the United States. It also became Shakira 10th song to hit the top 40 in the US. Its highest Billboard Hot 100 chart position so far is at number fifteen. As of March 2014, the song has sold 376,000 digital copies in the US.

The song made its chart debut in Ireland where it debuted at number seventeen on the Irish Singles Chart. In the UK the single debuted at number eleven on the UK Singles Chart, giving Shakira her eleventh UK top forty and Rihanna her thirty-ninth top forty. In France, the song entered the singles chart at number six and peaked at number 5 three week later, becoming Shakira's eleventh top ten and Rihanna's seventeenth. The single debuted at number 20 in Germany, and climbed to number nine a few weeks later then peaked at number eight. Elsewhere, in Europe, the song was commercially successful, reaching the top 10 in more than 20 countries. In Latin American, the single fared pretty well reaching the top 10 in many territories. The song went number one in Lebanon, Greece Digital Songs, Mexican Airplay, Polish Dance Top 50, and US Dance Club Songs charts. The song peaked at 85 on Billboard Hot 100 year end chart. It was Shakira's only song in the 2010s to do so. The Spanish version of the song ended up being number one in Venezuela.

== Music video ==
The accompanying music video for "Can't Remember to Forget You" was filmed by American director Joseph Kahn. On 8 December 2013, Shakira tweeted that she had finished shooting the video with Kahn. The premiere of the video took place on 30 January 2014, and debuted during "Shakira: Off the Charts" a 30-min special 8:pm ET/PT on E! Online. The video was made available for streaming on Shakira's Vevo profile on YouTube where it received more than 17.1 million views during its first 24 hours of availability. On 9 February 2014, the video reached 100 million views, becoming Shakira's eighth Vevo Certified music video. As of November 2019, it has received over 1 billion views.

== Fedde Le Grand remix ==
On 12 February 2014, Dutch DJ Fedde Le Grand an EDM remix to the song, the remix revived praise with critics saying "his electro-house makeover turns the song into perfect club fodder."

== Live performances ==
On 25 March 2014, Shakira held an iHeartRadio album party which was presented by Target, live from the iHeartRadio Theater in Los Angeles. During the party Shakira performed "Can't Remember To Forget You," along with other songs from the album. On 28 March 2014 Shakira performed the song at the German award show Echo Music Prize. She also performed the song on Today in the US and on Le Grand Journal in France. Also, she performed the song on Wango Tango. Also, she performed the song for a mini-concert in a Brazilian TV show called Fantástico, which aired on 13 July 2014.

The song was included in her 2018 El Dorado World Tour, her 2019 live album accompanying the tour, and during her Copacabana show, plus the World Cup leg of her 2025-2026 Las Mujeres Ya No Lloran World Tour.

== Track listing ==
- Digital download
1. "Can't Remember to Forget You" (featuring Rihanna) – 3:26
- Digital download (Spanish)
1. "Nunca Me Acuerdo de Olvidarte" – 3:26
- CD
1. "Can't Remember to Forget You" (featuring Rihanna) – 3:26
2. "Nunca Me Acuerdo de Olvidarte" – 3:26
- Digital download (Fedde Le Grand remix)
1. "Can't Remember to Forget You" (Fedde Le Grand remix; featuring Rihanna) – 5:13
- Digital download (Wideboys remix)
1. "Can't Remember to Forget You" (Wideboys remix) – 3:35

== Charts ==
=== Weekly charts ===
Weekly chart performance
Chart (2014)	Peak position
Australia (ARIA)	18
Austria (Ö3 Austria Top 40)	4
Belgium (Ultratop 50 Flanders)	9
Belgium (Ultratop 50 Wallonia)	6
Bulgaria Airplay (BAMP)	2
Brazil (Billboard Brasil Hot 100)	34
Brazil Hot Pop Songs	7
Canada Hot 100 (Billboard)	19
Canada CHR/Top 40 (Billboard)	26
CIS Airplay (TopHit)	5
Colombia (National-Report)	4
Croatia International Airplay (HRT)	1
Czech Republic Singles Digital (ČNS IFPI)	23
Denmark (Tracklisten)	11
Dominican Republic (Monitor Latino) Spanish version	2
Euro Digital Song Sales (Billboard)	5
Finland (Suomen virallinen lista)	6
Finland Airplay (Radiosoittolista)	11
France (SNEP)	5
Germany (GfK)	8
Greece (Billboard)	1
Hungary (Rádiós Top 40)	5
Hungary (Single Top 40)	6
Iceland (Lagalistinn)	7
Ireland (IRMA)	7
Israel (Media Forest)	6
Italy (FIMI)	13
Japan Hot 100 (Billboard)	22
Lebanon (The Official Lebanese Top 20)	1
Luxembourg (Billboard)	3
Mexico (Billboard Mexican Airplay)	1
Mexico (Monitor Latino)	6
Netherlands (Dutch Top 40)	15
Netherlands (Single Top 100)	26
New Zealand (Recorded Music NZ)	32
Norway (VG-lista)	5
Poland Airplay (ZPAV)	2
Poland Dance (ZPAV)	1
Portugal (Billboard)	7
Romania (Airplay 100)	5
Russia Airplay (TopHit)	5
Scottish Singles Sales (Official Charts)	6
Slovakia Airplay (ČNS IFPI)	7
Slovenia (SloTop50)	2
South Africa Airplay (EMA)	6
South Korea (Circle Chart)	3
Spain (Promusicae)	2
Sweden (Sverigetopplistan)	8
Switzerland (Schweizer Hitparade)	7
Turkey (Turkish Singles Chart)	3
UK Singles (Official Charts)	11
Ukraine Airplay (TopHit)	2
US Billboard Hot 100	15
US Adult Pop Airplay (Billboard)	36
US Dance Club Songs (Billboard)	1
US Latin Airplay (Billboard)	9
US Pop Airplay (Billboard)	23
US Rhythmic Airplay (Billboard)	32
US Hot Latin Songs (Billboard) Spanish version	6
Venezuela (Record Report)	2

=== Year-end charts ===
Year-end chart performance
Chart (2014)	Position
Austria (Ö3 Austria Top 40)	69
Belgium (Ultratop Flanders)	85
Belgium (Ultratop Wallonia)	62
Brazil (Crowley)	67
France (SNEP)	56
Germany (Official German Charts)	51
Hungary (Rádiós Top 40)	49
Hungary (Single Top 40)	52
Italy (FIMI)	53
Japan (Billboard Japan Adult Contemporary Airplay)	37
Japan (Billboard Japan Hot Top Airplay)	84
Netherlands (Dutch Top 40)	85
Perú Airplay (APDAYC)	108
Poland (Dance Top 50)	3
Poland (ZPAV Digital Sales)	7
Poland (ZPAV/BMAT Airplay)	25
Russia Airplay (TopHit)	90
Slovenia (SloTop50)	10
Spain (PROMUSICAE)	20
Sweden (Sverigetopplistan)	68
Switzerland (Schweizer Hitparade)	59
Ukraine Airplay (TopHit)	34
US Billboard Hot 100	85
US Dance Club Songs (Billboard)	26
US Latin Songs (Billboard)	36
Venezuela Pop/Rock General (Record Report)	1

== Certifications and sales ==
Certifications and sales
Region	Certification	Certified units/sales
Australia (ARIA)	Platinum	70,000^{^}
Brazil (Pro-Música Brasil)	2× Diamond	500,000^{‡}
Canada (Music Canada)	2× Platinum	160,000^{‡}
Germany (BVMI)	Platinum	300,000^{‡}
Italy (FIMI)	Platinum	30,000^{‡}
Mexico (AMPROFON)	Platinum	60,000^{*}
Norway (IFPI Norway)	5× Platinum	50,000^{‡}
New Zealand (RMNZ)	Platinum	30,000^{‡}
Spain (Promusicae)	Platinum	60,000^{‡}
Sweden (GLF)	Platinum	40,000^{‡}
Switzerland (IFPI Switzerland)	Gold	15,000^{^}
United Kingdom (BPI)	Platinum	600,000^{‡}
United States	—	2,000,000
Streaming
Denmark (IFPI Danmark)	Platinum	2,600,000^{†}
Spain (Promusicae)	Platinum	8,000,000^{†}
^{*} Sales figures based on certification alone.^{^} Shipments figures based on certification alone.^{‡} Sales+streaming figures based on certification alone.^{†} Streaming-only figures based on certification alone.

== Release history ==
Release history
Region	Date	Format	Version(s)	Label	Ref.
Various	13 January 2014	Digital download	Original	RCA	
Italy	13 January 2014	Radio airplay	Original	Sony Italy	
United States	14 January 2014	Contemporary hit radio	Original	RCA	
Various	21 January 2014	Digital download	Spanish	RCA	
Germany	14 February 2014	CD	Original; Spanish	Sony Germany	
Poland	18 February 2014	CD	Original; Spanish	Sony Poland	
