= AKT InMotion =

Fitness company

AKT InMotion is a New York City-based fitness company founded by fitness expert Anna Kaiser. Founded in 2013, the AKT program consists of a mixture of circuit training, HIIT, strength, toning, dance cardio, Pilates and yoga.

== Services and operations ==
AKT InMotion offers classes, private training, sessions with a staff nutritionist, Transformation Programs, On Demand streaming, retreats, intensives, pre- and post-natal programs, and a clothing line. Clients can pay for classes by using a drop-in pay method or by buying a membership. In addition, streaming memberships are available for on-the-go workouts, as well as DVDs of classes and a YouTube channel.

With a flagship location on the Upper East Side, the company has studios in NoMad, Manhattan, Los Angeles, Connecticut, and East Hampton.

== Clients ==
Clients include celebrities such as Drew Barrymore, Karlie Kloss, and Shakira. Kelly Ripa cites the AKTechnique as her favorite workout.
