= List of awards and nominations received by Shakira =

Shakira awards and nominations
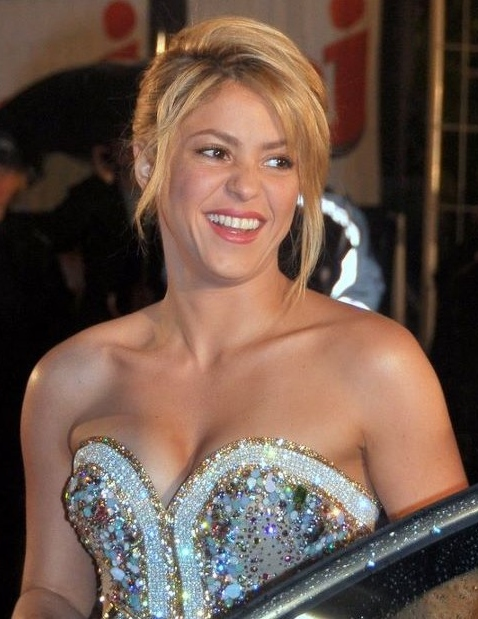
- Shakira during the NRJ Music Awards 2012
Awards and nominations
Award	Wins	Nominations
American Music Awards	6	9
Bambi Award	1	1
Billboard Latin Music Awards	44	117
Billboard Music Awards	6	26
Brit Awards	0	2
BMI Latin Awards	24	25
Emmy Awards	0	1
Golden Globe Awards	0	1
Grammy Awards	4	7
Latin Grammy Awards	16	34
MTV Europe Music Awards	2	18
MTV Video Music Awards	6	31
NRJ Music Awards	7	22
Premios MTV Latinoamérica	12	18
World Music Awards	7	17

Totals (Note: Certain award groups do not simply award one winner. They acknowledge several different recipients, have runners-up, and have third place. Since this is a specific recognition and is different from losing an award, runner-up mentions are considered wins in this award tally. For simplification and to avoid errors, each award in this list has been presumed to have had a prior nomination.)
- Wins: 455
- Nominations: 1012

Shakira is a Colombian singer-songwriter, recipient of various accolades in her career spanning four decades. With 100 million records sold, Shakira is one of the best-selling recording artists of all time.

Shakira won her first awards at a young age, winning Telecaribe's Buscando Un Artista Infantil contests in 1988, 1989 and 1990. Shakira's debut album, Magia (1991), helped her win the Super Estrella de Oro award for the Best New Barranquilla Singer in 1992. The album also allowed her to take part in festivals such as the Festival de la Canción (1991) in Buga, Colombia, and the Festival de la Independencia Cubana (1992) in Miami. Shakira performed the song "Eres" from her second album, Peligro (1993), at Viña del Mar International Song Festival of 1993 representing her native country. She won the third place, and was named the Best Vocalist/Popular Artist.

Shakira's third album, Pies Descalzos (1995), helped her win major awards and nominations in Latin America, becoming the first up-and-coming artist to win three awards at the inaugural Billboard Latin Music Awards. Her following record, Dónde Están Los Ladrones? (1998) garnered her first Grammy Awards nomination. After the release of her first crossover record, Laundry Service (2001), Shakira has since obtained several other major awards and nominations at the international level. She is the most awarded artist ever on the Los 40 Music Awards, the most awarded Latin female singer at the Billboard Latin Music Awards, and the most awarded female artist in the Latin Grammy Awards history before being overtaken by Natalia Lafourcade. Her success and career have been honored with various special awards, being named Artist of the Millennium by Colombian magazines Shock and Artist of the Century by TVyNovelas in 1999, a special Ivor Novello Awards in 2022, a Lifetime Award by France's NRJ Music Awards in 2019, and the MTV Video Vanguard Award in 2023, becoming the first South American artist to receive the award. The same year, she became the first recipient of the Billboard Latin Women of the Year.

Outside of her work in music, Shakira has won various accolades for her charitable endeavours by various major international organizations, including UNICEF Germany, World Economic Forum, International Labour Organization, United Nations and the World Literacy Foundation. In 2012, Shakira was condecored with Ordre des Arts et des Lettres by French government, in addition to be named Artist of the Year by the Harvard Foundation in 2011. In 2009, she became the youngest Person of the Year by the Latin Recording Academy. She also won awards by her fragrances, including some Academia del Perfume accolades.

== Awards and nominations ==
Award/organization (Note: Charts are not included, unless they are explicitly described as "awards" or specific trophies are given.)	Year	Nominee/work	Category	Result	Ref.
Academia de la Música de España	2006	Shakira	Latin Award of Honor	Honoree	
Academia del Perfume (Spain)	2010	S by Shakira	Best Feminine Fragrance	Won	
Academia del Perfume (Spain)	2012	Elixir by Shakira	Best Feminine Fragrance	Won	
Academia del Perfume (Spain)	2024	Red by Shakira	Lifetime Femenine	Won	
ALMA Award	2002	Shakira	Outstanding Female Performer, Female	Won	
ALMA Award	2002	Laundry Service	Album of the Year	Won	
ALMA Award	2002	"Whenever, Wherever"	Song of the Year	Nominated	
ALMA Award	2006	Shakira	Outstanding Female Performer, Female	Won	
ALMA Award	2006	Fijacion Oral Vol. 1	Album of the Year	Won	
ALMA Award	2008	Shakira	Humanitarian Award	Honoree	
ALMA Award	2011	Shakira	Favorite Female Music Artist	Nominated	
Amadeus Austrian Music Awards	2002	"Whenever, Wherever"	International Single of the Year	Won	
Amadeus Austrian Music Awards	2007	"Hips Don't Lie" (Shakira featuring Wyclef Jean)	International Single of the Year	Nominated	
American Music Awards	2001	Shakira	Favorite Latin Artist	Nominated	
American Music Awards	2002	Shakira	Favorite Latin Artist	Nominated	
American Music Awards	2003	Shakira	Favorite Latin Artist	Nominated	
American Music Awards	2005	Shakira	Favorite Latin Artist	Won	
American Music Awards	2006	Shakira	Favorite Latin Artist	Won	
American Music Awards	2010	Shakira	Favorite Latin Artist	Won	
American Music Awards	2012	Shakira	Favorite Latin Artist	Won	
American Music Awards	2017	Shakira	Favorite Latin Artist	Won	
American Music Awards	2025	"Soltera"	Favorite Latin Song	Won	
American Music Awards	2025	Shakira	Favorite Female Latin Artist	Nominated	
American Music Awards	2026	"Las Mujeres Ya No Lloran World Tour"	Tour of the Year	Won	
American Music Awards	2026	Shakira	Best Female Latin Artist	Won	
Asociación Latina de Periodistas de Entretenimiento de Estados Unidos	2006	Shakira	Corazones Estrellas Awards	Won	
Asociación de Periodistas del Espectáculo, ACPE (Colombia)	1996	Shakira	Best Colombian Songwriter	Won	
Asociación de Periodistas del Espectáculo, ACPE (Colombia)	1996	Shakira	Best Singer	Won	
Asociación de Periodistas del Espectáculo, ACPE (Colombia)	1996	Pies Descalzos	Best Album	Won	
Association of Latin Entertainment Critics (ACE, New York)	1997	Shakira	Female Revelation of the Year	Nominated	
Association of Latin Entertainment Critics (ACE, New York)	1999	Shakira	Favorite Female Artist	Nominated	
Association of Latin Entertainment Critics (ACE, New York)	2002	Shakira	Favorite Female Artist	Nominated	
Bambi Award	2009	Shakira	International Pop Artist	Won	
Barranquilla Carnival	1998	Shakira	Super Congo de Oro	Gold	
BDSCertified Spin Awards	2002	"Objection/Te Aviso, Te Anuncio"	50,000 Spins	Won	
BDSCertified Spin Awards	2002	"Underneath Your Clothes"	100,000 Spins	Won	
BDSCertified Spin Awards	2004	"Whenever, Wherever"	300,000 Spins	Won	
BDSCertified Spin Awards	2005	"Que Me Quedes Tú"	50,000 Spins	Won	
BDSCertified Spin Awards	2006	"La Tortura" (with Alejandro Sanz)	100,000 Spins	Won	
BDSCertified Spin Awards	2007	"Beautiful Liar" (With Beyoncé)	50,000 Spins	Won	
BDSCertified Spin Awards	2009	"She Wolf"	100,000 Spins	Won	
BDSCertified Spin Awards	2011	"Hips Don't Lie" (Shakira featuring Wyclef Jean)	500,000 Spins	Won	
BDSCertified Spin Awards	2011	"Loca" (Shakira featuring El Cata)	100,000 Spins	Won	
BET Awards	2007	"Beautiful Liar" (with Beyoncé)	Video of the Year	Nominated	
Billboard Latin Music Awards	1997	Shakira	Best New Artist	Won	
Billboard Latin Music Awards	1997	"Un Poco de Amor"	Best Pop Video of the Year	Won	
Billboard Latin Music Awards	1997	Pies Descalzos	Best Pop Album	Won	
Billboard Latin Music Awards	1999	Dónde Están los Ladrones?	Pop Album of the Year, Female	Won	
Billboard Latin Music Awards	2001	Shakira	Billboard 50 Artist of the Year	Nominated	
Billboard Latin Music Awards	2001	MTV Unplugged	Latin Rock Album of the Year	Won	
Billboard Latin Music Awards	2001	MTV Unplugged	Pop Album of the Year, Female	Nominated	
Billboard Latin Music Awards	2002	"Suerte"	Latin Pop Airplay Track of the Year	Nominated	
Billboard Latin Music Awards	2002	Shakira	Telemundo Viewer's Choice Award	Won	
Billboard Latin Music Awards	2003	Grandes Éxitos	Latin Greatest Hits Album Of The Year	Nominated	
Billboard Latin Music Awards	2003	Shakira	Latin Tour of the Year	Nominated	
Billboard Latin Music Awards	2004	"Que Me Quedes Tú"	Latin Pop Airplay Track of the Year, Female	Nominated	
Billboard Latin Music Awards	2006	Grandes Éxitos	Latin Greatest Hits Album Of The Year	Nominated	
Billboard Latin Music Awards	2006	"No"	Latin Pop Airplay Song Of The Year, Female	Nominated	
Billboard Latin Music Awards	2006	Fijación Oral, Vol. 1	Latin Pop Album of the Year, Female	Won	
Billboard Latin Music Awards	2006	Shakira	Spirit of Hope	Honoree	
Billboard Latin Music Awards	2006	Shakira	Top Latin Albums Artist Of The Year	Nominated	
Billboard Latin Music Awards	2006	Shakira	Hot Latin Songs Artist of the Year	Nominated	
Billboard Latin Music Awards	2006	"La Tortura" (with Alejandro Sanz)	Hot Latin Song of the Year	Won	
Billboard Latin Music Awards	2006	"La Tortura" (with Alejandro Sanz)	Hot Latin Song of the Year, Vocal Duet	Won	
Billboard Latin Music Awards	2006	"La Tortura" (with Alejandro Sanz)	Latin Pop Airplay Song Of The Year, Duo or Group	Won	
Billboard Latin Music Awards	2006	"La Tortura" (with Alejandro Sanz)	Latin Ringtone of the Year	Won	
Billboard Latin Music Awards	2007	Shakira	Latin Tour of the Year	Nominated	
Billboard Latin Music Awards	2007	"Hips Don't Lie" (with Wyclef Jean)	Latin Pop Airplay Song Of The Year, Duo Or Group	Nominated	
Billboard Latin Music Awards	2007	"Hips Don't Lie" (with Wyclef Jean)	Hot Latin Song Of The Year, Vocal Duet	Won	
Billboard Latin Music Awards	2007	"Hips Don't Lie" (with Wyclef Jean)	Hot Latin Song of the Year	Nominated	
Billboard Latin Music Awards	2008	"Te Lo Agradezco, Pero No"	Hot Latin Song Of The Year, Vocal Duet	Nominated	
Billboard Latin Music Awards	2008	"Hips Don't Lie" (Shakira featuring Wyclef Jean)	Latin Ringtone of the Year	Nominated	
Billboard Latin Music Awards	2009	Shakira	Latin Digital Download Artist	Nominated	
Billboard Latin Music Awards	2010	Shakira	Hot Latin Songs Artist of the Year, Female	Won	
Billboard Latin Music Awards	2010	Shakira	Latin Pop Airplay Artist of the Year, Female	Nominated	
Billboard Latin Music Awards	2010	Shakira	Tropical Airplay Artist of the Year, Female	Won	
Billboard Latin Music Awards	2010	"Loba"	Latin Pop Airplay - Song of the year	Nominated	
Billboard Latin Music Awards	2010	"Loba"	Latin Digital Download - Song of the Year	Nominated	
Billboard Latin Music Awards	2011	Shakira	Latin Artist of the Year	Nominated	
Billboard Latin Music Awards	2011	Shakira	Hot Latin Songs Artist of the Year, Female	Won	
Billboard Latin Music Awards	2011	Shakira	Top Latin Albums Artist of the Year, Female	Won	
Billboard Latin Music Awards	2011	Shakira	Latin Pop Airplay Artist of the Year, Solo	Won	
Billboard Latin Music Awards	2011	Shakira	Latin Pop Albums Artist of the Year, Solo	Nominated	
Billboard Latin Music Awards	2011	Shakira	Latin Touring Artist of the Year	Nominated	
Billboard Latin Music Awards	2011	Shakira	Latin Social Artist of the Year	Won	
Billboard Latin Music Awards	2011	Sale el Sol	Latin Album of the Year	Nominated	
Billboard Latin Music Awards	2011	Sale el Sol	Latin Pop Album of the Year	Nominated	
Billboard Latin Music Awards	2011	Sale el Sol	Latin Digital Album of the Year	Won	
Billboard Latin Music Awards	2011	"Loca"	Hot Latin Song of the Year, Vocal Event	Nominated	
Billboard Latin Music Awards	2011	"Loca"	Latin Digital Download of the Year	Nominated	
Billboard Latin Music Awards	2011	"Waka Waka (This Time for Africa)"	Latin Digital Download of the Year	Won	
Billboard Latin Music Awards	2012	Shakira	Artist of the Year	Nominated	
Billboard Latin Music Awards	2012	Shakira	Songs Artist of the Year, Female	Won	
Billboard Latin Music Awards	2012	Shakira	Albums Artist of the Year, Female	Won	
Billboard Latin Music Awards	2012	Shakira	Latin Pop Albums Artist of the Year, Solo	Nominated	
Billboard Latin Music Awards	2012	Shakira	Latin Pop Songs Artist of the Year, Solo	Won	
Billboard Latin Music Awards	2012	Shakira	Tropical Songs Artist of the Year, Solo	Nominated	
Billboard Latin Music Awards	2012	Shakira	Social Artist of the Year	Nominated	
Billboard Latin Music Awards	2012	"Rabiosa"	Digital Song of the Year	Nominated	
Billboard Latin Music Awards	2012	"Waka Waka (This Time for Africa)"	Digital Song of the Year	Nominated	
Billboard Latin Music Awards	2012	Sale el Sol	Digital Album of the Year	Nominated	
Billboard Latin Music Awards	2013	Shakira	Social Artist of the Year	Won	
Billboard Latin Music Awards	2013	Shakira	Songs Artist of the Year, Female	Won	
Billboard Latin Music Awards	2013	Shakira	Streaming Artist of the Year	Nominated	
Billboard Latin Music Awards	2013	Shakira	Albums Artist of the Year, Female	Nominated	
Billboard Latin Music Awards	2013	Shakira	Latin Pop Songs Artist of the Year, Solo	Won	
Billboard Latin Music Awards	2013	Shakira	Latin Pop Albums Artist of the Year, Solo	Nominated	
Billboard Latin Music Awards	2013	"Addicted to You"	Latin Pop Song of the Year	Nominated	
Billboard Latin Music Awards	2014	Shakira	Social Artist of the Year	Won	
Billboard Latin Music Awards	2015	Shakira	Social Artist of the Year	Won	
Billboard Latin Music Awards	2015	Shakira	Hot Latin Songs Artist of the Year, Female	Nominated	
Billboard Latin Music Awards	2016	Shakira	Social Artist of the Year	Won	
Billboard Latin Music Awards	2016	Shakira	Hot Latin Songs Artist of the Year, Female	Won	
Billboard Latin Music Awards	2016	"Mi Verdad" (Maná featuring Shakira)	Latin Pop Song of the Year	Won	
Billboard Latin Music Awards	2016	"Mi Verdad" (Maná featuring Shakira)	Hot Latin Song of the Year, Vocal Event	Nominated	
Billboard Latin Music Awards	2017	Shakira	Social Artist of the Year	Nominated	
Billboard Latin Music Awards	2017	Shakira	Hot Latin Songs Artist of the Year, Female	Won	
Billboard Latin Music Awards	2017	Shakira	Latin Pop Songs Artist of the Year, Solo	Nominated	
Billboard Latin Music Awards	2017	"La Bicicleta" (with Carlos Vives)	Latin Pop Song of the Year	Nominated	
Billboard Latin Music Awards	2017	"La Bicicleta" (with Carlos Vives)	Digital Song of the Year	Nominated	
Billboard Latin Music Awards	2017	"La Bicicleta" (with Carlos Vives)	Airplay Song of the Year	Nominated	
Billboard Latin Music Awards	2017	"La Bicicleta" (with Carlos Vives)	Hot Latin Song of the Year	Nominated	
Billboard Latin Music Awards	2017	"La Bicicleta" (with Carlos Vives)	Hot Latin Song of the Year, Vocal Event	Nominated	
Billboard Latin Music Awards	2017	"Chantaje" (featuring Maluma)	Hot Latin Song of the Year, Vocal Event	Nominated	
Billboard Latin Music Awards	2018	Shakira	Social Artist of the Year	Nominated	
Billboard Latin Music Awards	2018	Shakira	Hot Latin Songs Artist of the Year, Female	Won	
Billboard Latin Music Awards	2018	Shakira	Top Latin Album Artist of the Year, Female	Won	
Billboard Latin Music Awards	2018	Shakira	Latin Pop Artist of the Year, Solo	Won	
Billboard Latin Music Awards	2018	"Chantaje" (featuring Maluma)	Hot Latin Song of the Year, Vocal Event	Nominated	
Billboard Latin Music Awards	2018	"Chantaje" (featuring Maluma)	Streaming Song of the Year	Nominated	
Billboard Latin Music Awards	2018	"Chantaje" (featuring Maluma)	Digital Song of the Year	Nominated	
Billboard Latin Music Awards	2018	"Chantaje" (featuring Maluma)	Latin Pop Song of the Year	Nominated	
Billboard Latin Music Awards	2018	"Me Enamoré"	Latin Pop Song of the Year	Nominated	
Billboard Latin Music Awards	2018	"Deja Vu" (with Prince Royce)	Tropical Song of the Year	Won	
Billboard Latin Music Awards	2018	El Dorado	Top Latin Album of the Year	Nominated	
Billboard Latin Music Awards	2018	El Dorado	Latin Pop Album of the Year	Won	
Billboard Latin Music Awards	2019	Shakira	Latin Pop Artist of the Year, Solo	Won	
Billboard Latin Music Awards	2019	Shakira	Top Latin Albums Artist of the Year, Female	Won	
Billboard Latin Music Awards	2019	Shakira	Tour of the Year	Nominated	
Billboard Latin Music Awards	2019	"Clandestino" (Shakira featuring Maluma)	Latin Pop Song of the Year	Nominated	
Billboard Latin Music Awards	2020	Shakira	Latin Pop Artist of the Year, Solo	Nominated	
Billboard Latin Music Awards	2020	Shakira	Top Latin Albums Artist of the Year, Female	Nominated	
Billboard Latin Music Awards	2021	Shakira	Top Latin Albums Artist of the Year, Female	Nominated	
Billboard Latin Music Awards	2021	Shakira	Latin Pop Artist of the Year, Solo	Won	
Billboard Latin Music Awards	2021	"Me Gusta" (with Anuel AA)	Latin Pop Song of the Year	Nominated	
Billboard Latin Music Awards	2022	"Te Felicito" (with Rauw Alejandro)	Latin Pop Song of the Year	Nominated	
Billboard Latin Music Awards	2023	Shakira	Hot Latin Songs Artist of the Year	Nominated	
Billboard Latin Music Awards	2023	Shakira	Latin Pop Artist of the Year, Solo	Won	
Billboard Latin Music Awards	2023	"TQG" (with Karol G)	Hot Latin Song of the Year	Nominated	
Billboard Latin Music Awards	2023	"TQG" (with Karol G)	Hot Latin Song of the Year, Vocal Event	Nominated	
Billboard Latin Music Awards	2023	"TQG" (with Karol G)	Latin Airplay Song of the Year	Nominated	
Billboard Latin Music Awards	2023	"TQG" (with Karol G)	Sales Song of the Year	Nominated	
Billboard Latin Music Awards	2023	"TQG" (with Karol G)	Latin Pop Song of the Year	Nominated	
Billboard Latin Music Awards	2023	"Shakira: Bzrp Music Sessions, Vol. 53" (with Bizarrap)	Latin Pop Song of the Year	Won	
Billboard Latin Music Awards	2023	"Shakira: Bzrp Music Sessions, Vol. 53" (with Bizarrap)	Sales Song of the Year	Nominated	
Billboard Latin Music Awards	2023	"Shakira: Bzrp Music Sessions, Vol. 53" (with Bizarrap)	Latin Airplay Song of the Year	Nominated	
Billboard Latin Music Awards	2023	"Monotonía" (with Ozuna)	Latin Airplay Song of the Year	Nominated	
Billboard Latin Music Awards	2024	Shakira	Hot Latin Songs Artist of the Year, Female	Nominated	
Billboard Latin Music Awards	2024	Shakira	Top Latin Albums Artist of the Year, Female	Nominated	
Billboard Latin Music Awards	2024	Shakira	Latin Pop Artist of the Year	Won	
Billboard Latin Music Awards	2024	Las Mujeres Ya No Lloran	Latin Pop Album of the Year	Nominated	
Billboard Latin Music Awards	2025	"Soltera"	Airplay Song of the Year	Nominated	
Billboard Latin Music Awards	2025	"Soltera"	Latin Pop Song of the Year	Won	
Billboard Latin Music Awards	2025	Shakira	Hot Latin Songs Artist of the Year, Female	Nominated	
Billboard Latin Music Awards	2025	Shakira	Latin Pop Artist	Won	
Billboard Latin Music Awards	2025	Shakira	Top Latin Albums Artist of the Year, Female	Nominated	
Billboard Latin Music Awards	2025	Shakira	Tour of the Year	Won	
Billboard Latin Music Awards	2026	"Algo Tú"	Latin Pop Song of the Year	Pending	
Billboard Latin Music Awards	2026	Shakira	Hot Latin Songs Artist of the Year, Female	Pending	
Billboard Latin Music Awards	2026	Shakira	Latin Pop Artist of the Year	Pending	
Billboard Latin Music Awards	2026	Shakira	Global 200 Latin Artist of the Year	Pending	
Billboard Latin Music Awards	2026	Shakira	Tour of the Year	Pending	
Billboard Latin Women in Music	2023	Shakira	Woman of the Year	Won	
Billboard Live Music Awards	2006	Shakira	Breakthrough Act	Nominated	
Billboard Music Awards	2005	Fijación Oral Vol. 1	Latin Album of the Year	Won	
Billboard Music Awards	2005	"La Tortura" (with Alejandro Sanz)	Latin Song of the Year	Won	
Billboard Music Awards	2005	Shakira	Latin Pop Albums Artist of the Year	Won	
Billboard Music Awards	2006	"Hips Don't Lie" (Shakira featuring Wyclef Jean)	Pop Single of the Year	Nominated	
Billboard Music Awards	2011	Shakira	Top Streaming Artist	Nominated	
Billboard Music Awards	2011	Shakira	Top Latin Artist	Won	
Billboard Music Awards	2011	Shakira	Fan Favorite Award	Nominated	
Billboard Music Awards	2011	"Waka Waka (This Time for Africa)"	Top Latin Song	Won	
Billboard Music Awards	2011	"Waka Waka (This Time for Africa)"	Top Streaming Song (Video)	Nominated	
Billboard Music Awards	2011	Sale el Sol	Top Latin Album	Nominated	
Billboard Music Awards	2011	"Loca" (Shakira featuring El Cata)	Top Latin Song	Nominated	
Billboard Music Awards	2011	"Gypsy"	Top Latin Song	Nominated	
Billboard Music Awards	2012	Shakira	Top Social Artist	Nominated	
Billboard Music Awards	2012	Shakira	Top Latin Artist	Won	
Billboard Music Awards	2013	Shakira	Top Latin Artist	Nominated	
Billboard Music Awards	2017	"Chantaje" (featuring Maluma)	Top Latin Song	Nominated	
Billboard Music Awards	2017	"La Bicicleta" (with Carlos Vives)	Top Latin Song	Nominated	
Billboard Music Awards	2018	El Dorado	Top Latin Album	Nominated	
Billboard Music Awards	2023	Shakira	Top Latin Female Artist	Nominated	
Billboard Music Awards	2023	"TQG" (with Karol G)	Top Latin Song	Nominated	
Billboard Music Awards	2023	"Shakira: Bzrp Music Sessions, Vol. 53" (with Bizarrap)	Top Dance/Electronic Song	Nominated	
Billboard Music Awards	2024	Shakira	Top Latin Female Artist	Nominated	
Blockbuster Entertainment Awards	2001	Shakira/MTV Unplugged	Favorite Artist — Latino (Internet Only)	Nominated	
BMI Latin Awards	2000	Shakira	Songwriter of the Year	Won	
BMI Latin Awards	2000	"Ciega, Sordomuda"	Most-Performed Songs/Winning Songs	Won	
BMI Latin Awards	2000	"Tú"	Most-Performed Songs/Winning Songs	Won	
BMI Latin Awards	2000	"Inevitable"	Most-Performed Songs/Winning Songs	Won	
BMI Latin Awards	2001	"No Creo"	Most-Performed Songs/Winning Songs	Won	
BMI Latin Awards	2002	"Ojos Así"	Most-Performed Songs/Winning Songs	Won	
BMI Latin Awards	2003	"Suerte"	Most-Performed Songs/Winning Songs	Won	
BMI Latin Awards	2003	"Te Aviso, Te Anuncio (Tango)"	Most-Performed Songs/Winning Songs	Won	
BMI Latin Awards	2004	"Que Me Quedes Tú"	Most-Performed Songs/Winning Songs	Won	
BMI Latin Awards	2007	"La Tortura" (with Alejandro Sanz)	Most-Performed Songs/Winning Songs	Won	
BMI Latin Awards	2007	"No"	Most-Performed Songs/Winning Songs	Won	
BMI Latin Awards	2010	"Las de la Intuición"	Most-Performed Songs/Winning Songs	Won	
BMI Latin Awards	2011	"Loba"	Most-Performed Songs/Winning Songs	Won	
BMI Latin Awards	2011	"Lo Hecho Está Hecho"	Most-Performed Songs/Winning Songs	Won	
BMI Latin Awards	2013	"Rabiosa"	Most-Performed Songs/Winning Songs	Won	
BMI Latin Awards	2013	"Sale el Sol"	Most-Performed Songs/Winning Songs	Won	
BMI Latin Awards	2014	"Addicted to You"	Most-Performed Songs/Winning Songs	Won	
BMI Latin Awards	2018	"Chantaje"	Most-Performed Songs/Winning Songs	Won	
BMI Latin Awards	2018	"La Bicicleta"	Most-Performed Songs/Winning Songs	Won	
BMI Latin Awards	2019	"Me Enamoré"	Most-Performed Songs/Winning Songs	Won	
BMI Latin Awards	2019	"Perro Fiel"	Most-Performed Songs/Winning Songs	Won	
BMI Latin Awards	2020	"Clandestino"	Most-Performed Songs/Winning Songs	Won	
BMI Latin Awards	2024	"TQG" (with Karol G)	Most-Performed Songs/Winning Songs	Won	
BMI Latin Awards	2024	"Shakira: Bzrp Music Sessions, Vol. 53" (with Bizarrap)	Most-Performed Songs/Winning Songs	Won	
BMI Latin Awards	2025	"Monotonía" (with Ozuna)	Most-Performed Songs	Nominated	
BMI London Awards	2008	"Beautiful Liar" (with Beyoncé)	Pop Award	Won	
BMI London Awards	2008	"Beautiful Liar" (with Beyoncé)	Dance Award	Won	
BMI London Awards	2015	"Can't Remember to Forget You" (with Rihanna)	Winning Song	Won	
BMI Pop Awards	2003	"Whenever, Wherever"	Winning Songs	Won	
BMI Pop Awards	2003	"Underneath Your Clothes"	Winning Songs	Won	
BMI Pop Awards	2007	"Hips Don't Lie"	Winning Songs	Won	
BMI Urban Awards	2006	"Hips Don't Lie"	Winning Songs	Won	
Bravo Otto (Germany)	2001	Shakira	Shooting-Star Solo	Gold	
Bravo Otto Awards (Hungary)	2006	Shakira	Best Foreign Female Singer	Won	
Brit Awards	2003	Shakira	Breakthrough Act	Nominated	
Brit Awards	2010	Shakira	Brit Award for International Female Solo Artist	Nominated	
Buscando Un Artista Infantil (Colombia)	1988	Shakira	Contestant Winner	Won	
Buscando Un Artista Infantil (Colombia)	1989	Shakira	Contestant Winner	Won	
Buscando Un Artista Infantil (Colombia)	1990	Shakira	Contestant Winner	Won	
Danish Music Awards	2011	"Waka Waka (This Time for Africa)"	International Hit of the Year	Nominated	
Do Something Awards	2010	Shakira	Do Something Musical Artist	Nominated	
Do Something Awards	2012	Shakira	Do Something Musical Artist	Nominated	
Dorian Awards	2020	Super Bowl LIV halftime show	Best TV Musical Performance	Nominated	
E! Entertainment Awards	2011	Shakira	Celebrity E!	Nominated	
ECHO Music Prize	2003	Shakira	Best International Female Artist	Won	
ECHO Music Prize	2003	Shakira	Best International Newcomer	Nominated	
ECHO Music Prize	2003	"Whenever, Wherever"	Best International Single	Nominated	
ECHO Music Prize	2006	Shakira	Best International Female Artist	Nominated	
ECHO Music Prize	2007	"Hips Don't Lie" (featuring Wyclef Jean)	Best International Single	Nominated	
ECHO Music Prize	2007	Shakira	Best International Female Artist	Nominated	
ECHO Music Prize	2011	"Waka Waka (This Time For Africa)"	Hit Song of the Year	Nominated	
ECHO Music Prize	2011	Shakira	Best International Female Artist	Nominated	
ECHO Music Prize	2015	Shakira	Best International Female Artist	Nominated	
Ein Herz für Kinder	2007	Shakira	Charity Award	Honoree	
Eres Award (Mexico)	1997	Shakira	Best Female Singer	Won	
Eres Award (Mexico)	1998	Shakira	Best Female Singer	Won	
Eres Award (Mexico)	1999	Shakira	Best Female Singer	Won	
Fan Choice Awards (Mexico) (Note: A Mexican fan-voted award.)	2021	Shakira	Urban Artist - Female	Nominated	
Fan Choice Awards (Mexico)	2021	Shakira	Best Collaborative Video - Female	Nominated	
FMDOS Awards	2023	"TQG" (with Karol G)	Collaboration of the Year	Won	
FiFi Awards	2011	S by Shakira	Women's Broad Appeal	Nominated	
Fundación Liderazgo y Democracia/Semana	2014	Shakira	Mejores Líderes de Colombia	Won	
Fundación para la Integración y Desarrollo de América Latina (FIDAL)	2017	Barefoot Foundation	Nôus Trayectoria de Vida	Honoree	
Galardón a los Grandes (Mexico) (Note: Award original given by Raul Velasco in Siempre en Domingo.)	2010	Shakira	Pop Female Artist	Nominated	
Galardón a los Grandes (Mexico)	2010	"Loba"	Most Popular Song	Nominated	
Galardón a los Grandes (Mexico)	2010	"Waka Waka (This Time for Africa)"	Most Popular Pop Song	Nominated	
Globo Awards (New York) (Note: transl. Globe Awards)	1999	Dónde Están los Ladrones?	Best Pop Album — Female Artist	Won	
Globo Awards (New York)	2001	MTV Unplugged	Best Female Pop Album	Won	
Goldene Europa	2002	Shakira	Shooting Star of the Year	Won	
Golden Globe Awards	2008	"Despedida"	Best Original Song - Motion Picture	Nominated	
Grammy Awards	1999	Dónde Están Los Ladrones?	Best Latin Rock or Alternative Album	Nominated	
Grammy Awards	2001	MTV Unplugged	Best Latin Pop Album	Won	
Grammy Awards	2006	Fijación Oral, Vol. 1	Best Latin Rock/Alternative Album	Won	
Grammy Awards	2007	"Hips Don't Lie" (with Wyclef Jean)	Best Pop Collaboration with Vocals	Nominated	
Grammy Awards	2008	"Beautiful Liar" (with Beyoncé)	Best Pop Collaboration with Vocals	Nominated	
Grammy Awards	2018	El Dorado	Best Latin Pop Album	Won	
Grammy Awards	2025	Las Mujeres Ya No Lloran	Best Latin Pop Album	Won	
Groovevolt Music Awards	2006	Fijación Oral, Vol. 1	Best Latin Album	Won	
Grupo Hachette	2008	Shakira + SEAT Ibiza	Best Commercial	Won	
Grupo Hachette	2011	Shakira + SEAT	Best Commercial	Won	
Harvard Foundation	2011	Shakira	Artist of the Year	Won	
Heat Latin Music Awards	2015	Shakira	Best Female Artist	Nominated	
Heat Latin Music Awards	2021	Shakira	Best Female Artist	Nominated	
Heat Latin Music Awards	2021	"Shakira: Bzrp Music Sessions, Vol. 53" (with Bizarrap)	Song of the Year	Nominated	
Heat Latin Music Awards	2021	"TQG" (with Karol G)	Best Collaboration	Nominated	
Heat Latin Music Awards	2024	Shakira	Best Female Artist	Nominated	
Heat Latin Music Awards	2024	"Puntería" (with Cardi B)	Best Video	Nominated	
Heat Latin Music Awards	2024	Las Mujeres Ya No Lloran	Best Album	Nominated	
Heat Latin Music Awards	2025	Shakira	Best Female Artist	Nominated	
Hispanic magazine	2006	Shakira	Hispanic of the Year	Won	
HTV Awards	2006	Shakira	Most Popular Artist	Won	
Hollywood Music in Media Awards	2025	"Zoo" (from Zootopia 2)	Best Original Song in an Animated Film	Nominated	
Hollywood Walk of Fame	2011	Shakira	Walk of Star	Won	
Hungarian Music Awards	2003	Laundry Service	International Modern Pop/Rock Album	Nominated	
Hungarian Music Awards	2011	Sale el Sol	International Modern Pop/Rock Album	Nominated	
iHeartRadio Music Awards	2016	"Mi Verdad" (Maná featuring Shakira)	Latin Song of the Year	Won	
iHeartRadio Music Awards	2018	Shakira	Latin Artist of the Year	Nominated	
iHeartRadio Music Awards	2018	El Dorado	Latin Album of the Year	Won	
iHeartRadio Music Awards	2019	"Clandestino" (Shakira featuring Maluma)	Latin Song of the Year	Nominated	
iHeartRadio Music Awards	2023	"Don't You Worry" (with Black Eyed Peas & David Guetta)	Best Music Video — Fan Vote	Nominated	
iHeartRadio Music Awards	2024	Shakira	Artist of the Year	Nominated	
iHeartRadio Music Awards	2024	Shakira	Latin Pop / Urban Artist of the year	Nominated	
iHeartRadio Music Awards	2024	"TQG" (with Karol G)	Best Collaboration	Nominated	
iHeartRadio Music Awards	2024	"TQG" (with Karol G)	Best Music Video	Nominated	
iHeartRadio Music Awards	2024	"TQG" (with Karol G)	Latin Pop / Urban Song of the Year	Nominated	
iHeartRadio Music Awards	2024	"Shakira: Bzrp Music Sessions, Vol. 53" (with Bizarrap)	Latin Pop / Urban Song of the Year	Won	
International Dance Music Awards	2003	"Objection"	Best Latin Track	Nominated	
International Dance Music Awards	2006	"La Tortura" (with Alejandro Sanz)	Best Latin Track	Won	
International Dance Music Awards	2007	"Hips Don't Lie" (Shakira featuring Wyclef Jean)	Best Latin/Reggaeton Track	Won	
International Dance Music Awards	2010	"She Wolf"	Best Latin/Reggaeton Track	Nominated	
International Dance Music Awards	2011	"Loca"	Best Latin/Reggaeton Track	Nominated	
International Dance Music Awards	2011	"Waka Waka (This Time for Africa)"	Best Latin/Reggaeton Track	Nominated	
International Dance Music Awards	2012	"Rabiosa"	Best Latin/Reggaeton Track	Nominated	
International Dance Music Awards	2013	"Addicted to You"	Best Latin/Reggaeton Track	Nominated	
International Dance Music Awards	2015	"La La La (Brazil 2014)"	Best Latin/Reggaeton Track	Nominated	
International Labour Organization	2010	Shakira	Justice Award	Honoree	
International Reggae & World Music Awards	2006	Shakira	Best Latin Entertainer	Won	
International Reggae & World Music Awards	2007	Shakira	Best Latin Entertainer	Won	
International Reggae & World Music Awards	2009	Shakira	Best Latin Entertainer	Won	
International Reggae & World Music Awards	2011	Shakira	Best Latin Entertainer	Won	
International Reggae & World Music Awards	2014	Shakira	Best	Won	
Ivor Novello Awards	2008	"Beautiful Liar" (with Beyoncé)	Best-selling British Song	Won	
Ivor Novello Awards	2022	Shakira	Special International Award	Honoree	
Jovenes Líderes	2010	Shakira	Joven Líder (Young Leader)	Honoree	
Juno Awards	2003	Laundry Service	International Album of the Year	Nominated	
Juventud Awards	2004	Shakira	She's Totally Red Carpet	Nominated	
Juventud Awards	2004	Shakira	Dream Chic	Nominated	
Juventud Awards	2004	Shakira	Best Moves	Nominated	
Juventud Awards	2004	Shakira	All Over the Dial	Nominated	
Juventud Awards	2004	Shakira	My Idol Is	Nominated	
Juventud Awards	2004	Shakira & Antonio De La Rua	Hottest Romance	Nominated	
Juventud Awards	2005	Shakira	Favorite Rock Star	Won	
Juventud Awards	2005	Shakira	Favorite Pop Star	Won	
Juventud Awards	2005	Shakira	My Idol Is..	Nominated	
Juventud Awards	2005	Shakira	Best Moves	Won	
Juventud Awards	2005	Shakira	I Hear Her Everywhere	Won	
Juventud Awards	2005	Fijación Oral Vol. 1	CD to Die For	Nominated	
Juventud Awards	2005	"La Tortura" (with Alejandro Sanz)	Catchiest Tune	Nominated	
Juventud Awards	2005	Shakira and Alejandro Sanz	Dynamic Duet	Won	
Juventud Awards	2006	Shakira	Favorite Rock artist	Won	
Juventud Awards	2006	Shakira	Favorite pop star	Nominated	
Juventud Awards	2006	Shakira	Best Moves	Won	
Juventud Awards	2007	Shakira	Favorite Pop star	Nominated	
Juventud Awards	2007	Shakira	My Favorite Concert	Nominated	
Juventud Awards	2007	Shakira	Best Moves	Nominated	
Juventud Awards	2007	Shakira	My Idol is...	Won	
Juventud Awards	2007	"Te Lo Agradezco, Pero No" (with Alejandro Sanz)	The Perfect Combo	Won	
Juventud Awards	2008	Shakira	Best Moves	Nominated	
Juventud Awards	2010	Shakira	Best Moves	Nominated	
Juventud Awards	2010	Shakira	Supernova Award	Honoree	
Juventud Awards	2010	"Loca"	My Favorite Video	Won	
Juventud Awards	2010	"Loca"	My Ringtone	Nominated	
Juventud Awards	2010	"Somos el Mundo"	The Perfect Combo	Nominated	
Juventud Awards	2011	Shakira	Best Moves	Won	
Juventud Awards	2011	Shakira	Favorite Pop Star	Nominated	
Juventud Awards	2011	"Loca" (Shakira featuring El Cata)	Catchiest Tune	Nominated	
Juventud Awards	2011	"Loca" (Shakira featuring El Cata)	My Favorite Video	Nominated	
Juventud Awards	2011	"Loca" (Shakira featuring El Cata)	Favorite Ringtone	Nominated	
Juventud Awards	2011	Sale El Sol	Your Favorite CD	Nominated	
Juventud Awards	2011	The Sun Comes Out World Tour	The Super Tour	Nominated	
Juventud Awards	2012	Shakira	Best Moves	Won	
Juventud Awards	2012	Shakira	Favorite Pop Star	Nominated	
Juventud Awards	2013	Shakira	Best Moves	Won	
Juventud Awards	2014	Shakira	Best Moves	Nominated	
Juventud Awards	2014	"Can't Remember to Forget You" (with Rihanna)	Favorite hit	Won	
Juventud Awards	2015	"Me Verdad" (Maná featuring Shakira)	The Perfect Combo	Nominated	
Juventud Awards	2015	"Me Verdad" (Maná featuring Shakira)	Favorite Lyrics	Nominated	
Juventud Awards	2016	"Me Verdad" (Maná featuring Shakira)	Best Song in Telenovela	Nominated	
Juventud Awards	2016	Shakira	Best Twitter Star	Nominated	
Juventud Awards	2017	"Chantaje" (featuring Maluma)	Best Song For Dancing	Nominated	
Juventud Awards	2017	"Chantaje" (featuring Maluma)	Perfect Combination	Nominated	
Juventud Awards	2017	"La Bicicleta" (with Carlos Vives)	Perfect Combination	Nominated	
Juventud Awards	2017	"La Bicicleta" (with Carlos Vives)	Best Song For "Chillin"	Nominated	
Juventud Awards	2020	"Me Gusta" (with Anuel AA)	OMG Collaboration	Nominated	
Juventud Awards	2023	Shakira	Female Artist	Won	
Juventud Awards	2023	Shakira	Honorary Agent of Change	Honoree	
Juventud Awards	2023	"Shakira: Bzrp Music Sessions, Vol. 53" (with Bizarrap)	Best Pop / Urban Song	Won	
Juventud Awards	2023	"Shakira: Bzrp Music Sessions, Vol. 53" (with Bizarrap)	Best Song For My Ex	Won	
Juventud Awards	2023	"TQG" (with Karol G)	Girl Power	Won	
Juventud Awards	2023	"TQG" (with Karol G)	Best Urban Track	Won	
Juventud Awards	2023	"TQG" (with Karol G)	Social Dance Challenge	Won	
Juventud Awards	2023	"TQG" (with Karol G)	Best Pop / Urban Collaboration	Won	
Juventud Awards	2023	"Te Felicito" (with Rauw Alejandro)	Best Pop / Urban Collaboration	Nominated	
Juventud Awards	2023	"Monotonía" (with Ozuna)	Best Tropical Mix	Won	
Juventud Awards	2024	Shakira	Artist of the Youth – Female	Nominated	
Juventud Awards	2024	"El Jefe" (with Fuerza Regida)	The Perfect Mix	Nominated	
Juventud Awards	2024	"Puntería" (with Cardi B)	OMG Collaboration	Nominated	
Juventud Awards	2024	"Puntería" (with Cardi B)	Girl Power	Nominated	
Juventud Awards	2024	"Copa Vacía" (with Manuel Turizo)	Best Pop/Urban Collaboration	Nominated	
Juventud Awards	2024	Las Mujeres Ya No Lloran	Best Pop/Urban Album	Won	
Juventud Awards	2025	"Soltera"	Best Pop/Urban Song	Nominated	
Juventud Awards	2026	Shakira	Artist of the Youth – Female	Won	
Juventud Awards	2026	"Choka Choka" (with Anitta)	Girl Power	Nominated	
Juventud Awards	2026	"Dai Dai" (with Burna Boy)	OMG Collaboration	Won	
Juventud Awards	2026	"Algo Tú" (with Beéle)	Best Dance Track	Nominated	
Juventud Awards	2026	Las Mujeres Ya No Lloran World Tour	Best Tour	Nominated	
Juventud Awards	2026	"Bésame" (with Alejandro Sanz)	Best Pop Song	Won	
Latin American Music Awards	2015	"Mi Verdad" (Maná featuring Shakira)	Favorite Song Pop/Rock	Nominated	
Latin American Music Awards	2015	"Mi Verdad" (Maná featuring Shakira)	Favorite Collaboration	Nominated	
Latin American Music Awards	2016	Shakira	Favorite Female Artist Pop/Rock	Nominated	
Latin American Music Awards	2017	Shakira	Artist of the Year	Nominated	
Latin American Music Awards	2017	Shakira	Favorite Female Artist Pop/Rock	Nominated	
Latin American Music Awards	2017	"Chantaje" (featuring Maluma)	Favorite Song Pop/Rock	Nominated	
Latin American Music Awards	2017	"Chantaje" (featuring Maluma)	Favorite Collaboration	Nominated	
Latin American Music Awards	2017	"Chantaje" (featuring Maluma)	Song of the Year	Nominated	
Latin American Music Awards	2017	"Deja Vu" (with Prince Royce)	Song of the Year	Won	
Latin American Music Awards	2017	"Deja Vu" (with Prince Royce)	Favorite Tropical Song	Won	
Latin American Music Awards	2017	El Dorado	Album of the Year	Nominated	
Latin American Music Awards	2017	El Dorado	Favorite Album Pop/Rock	Nominated	
Latin American Music Awards	2018	Shakira	Artist of the Year	Nominated	
Latin American Music Awards	2018	Shakira	Favorite Female Artist	Nominated	
Latin American Music Awards	2018	Shakira	Favorite Artist — Pop	Nominated	
Latin American Music Awards	2018	"Perro Fiel" (featuring Nicky Jam)	Favorite Song — Pop	Nominated	
Latin American Music Awards	2021	Shakira	Favorite Female Artist	Nominated	
Latin American Music Awards	2021	Shakira	Favorite Pop Artist	Won	
Latin American Music Awards	2021	Shakira	Social Artist of the Year	Nominated	
Latin American Music Awards	2021	"Me Gusta" (with Anuel AA)	Favorite Pop Song	Won	
Latin American Music Awards	2023	Shakira	Favorite Pop Artist	Won	
Latin American Music Awards	2023	"Te Felicito" (with Rauw Alejandro)	Song of the Year	Nominated	
Latin American Music Awards	2023	"Te Felicito" (with Rauw Alejandro)	Collaboration of the Year	Nominated	
Latin American Music Awards	2023	"Te Felicito" (with Rauw Alejandro)	Best Collaboration — Pop/Urban	Nominated	
Latin American Music Awards	2023	"Monotonía" (with Ozuna)	Best Collaboration — Tropical	Won	
Latin American Music Awards	2024	Shakira	Artist of the Year	Nominated	
Latin American Music Awards	2024	Shakira	Favorite Pop Artist	Won	
Latin American Music Awards	2024	Shakira	Global Latin Artist of the Year	Nominated	
Latin American Music Awards	2024	"Acróstico"	Favorite Pop Song	Won	
Latin American Music Awards	2024	"TQG" (with Karol G)	Favorite Urban Song	Nominated	
Latin American Music Awards	2024	"TQG" (with Karol G)	Song of the Year	Won	
Latin American Music Awards	2024	"Shakira: Bzrp Music Sessions, Vol. 53" (with Bizarrap)	Song of the Year	Nominated	
Latin American Music Awards	2024	"Shakira: Bzrp Music Sessions, Vol. 53" (with Bizarrap)	Global Latin Song of the Year	Nominated	
Latin American Music Awards	2024	"Shakira: Bzrp Music Sessions, Vol. 53" (with Bizarrap)	Collaboration of the Year	Nominated	
Latin Grammy Awards	2002	"Octavo Día"	Best Female Rock Vocal Performance	Won	
Latin Grammy Awards	2002	"Ojos Así"	Best Female Pop Vocal Performance	Won	
Latin Grammy Awards	2002	"Ojos Así"	Best Short Form Music Video	Nominated	
Latin Grammy Awards	2002	MTV Unplugged	Album of the Year	Nominated	
Latin Grammy Awards	2002	MTV Unplugged	Best Pop Vocal Album	Nominated	
Latin Grammy Awards	2002	"Suerte"	Best Short Form Music Video	Won	
Latin Grammy Awards	2003	"Te Aviso, Te Anuncio (Tango)"	Best Rock Song	Nominated	
Latin Grammy Awards	2006	Fijación Oral, Vol. 1	Album of the Year	Won	
Latin Grammy Awards	2006	Fijación Oral, Vol. 1	Best Female Pop Vocal Album	Won	
Latin Grammy Awards	2006	"La Tortura" (with Alejandro Sanz)	Record of the Year	Won	
Latin Grammy Awards	2006	"La Tortura" (with Alejandro Sanz)	Song of the Year	Won	
Latin Grammy Awards	2006	"La Tortura" (with Alejandro Sanz)	Best Short Form Music Video	Nominated	
Latin Grammy Awards	2007	"Bello Embustero" (with Beyoncé)	Record of the Year	Nominated	
Latin Grammy Awards	2011	Sale el Sol	Album of the Year	Nominated	
Latin Grammy Awards	2011	Sale el Sol	Best Female Pop Vocal Album	Won	
Latin Grammy Awards	2011	"Loca"	Best Short Form Music Video	Nominated	
Latin Grammy Awards	2012	En Vivo Desde Paris	Best Long Form Music Video	Nominated	
Latin Grammy Awards	2016	"La Bicicleta" (with Carlos Vives)	Record of the Year	Won	
Latin Grammy Awards	2016	"La Bicicleta" (with Carlos Vives)	Song of the Year	Won	
Latin Grammy Awards	2017	"Deja Vu" (with Prince Royce)	Best Tropical Song	Nominated	
Latin Grammy Awards	2017	El Dorado	Album of the Year	Nominated	
Latin Grammy Awards	2017	El Dorado	Best Contemporary Pop Vocal Album	Won	
Latin Grammy Awards	2017	"Chantaje" (featuring Maluma)	Record of the Year	Nominated	
Latin Grammy Awards	2017	"Chantaje" (featuring Maluma)	Song of the Year	Nominated	
Latin Grammy Awards	2017	"Chantaje" (featuring Maluma)	Best Urban Fusion/Performance	Nominated	
Latin Grammy Awards	2022	"Te Felicito" (with Rauw Alejandro)	Record of the Year	Nominated	
Latin Grammy Awards	2023	"Shakira: Bzrp Music Sessions, Vol. 53" (with Bizarrap)	Song of the Year	Won	
Latin Grammy Awards	2023	"Shakira: Bzrp Music Sessions, Vol. 53" (with Bizarrap)	Best Pop Song	Won	
Latin Grammy Awards	2023	"Shakira: Bzrp Music Sessions, Vol. 53" (with Bizarrap)	Record of the Year	Nominated	
Latin Grammy Awards	2023	"Acróstico"	Song of the Year	Nominated	
Latin Grammy Awards	2023	"TQG" (with Karol G)	Song of the Year	Nominated	
Latin Grammy Awards	2023	"TQG" (with Karol G)	Best Urban Fusion/Performance	Won	
Latin Grammy Awards	2023	"TQG" (with Karol G)	Best Urban Song	Nominated	
Latin Grammy Awards	2024	Las Mujeres Ya No Lloran	Album of the Year	Nominated	
Latin Grammy Awards	2024	"(Entre Paréntesis)" (with Grupo Frontera)	Song of the Year	Nominated	
Latin Grammy Awards	2024	"Shakira: Bzrp Music Sessions, Vol. 53 (Tiësto Remix)" (with Bizarrap and Tiësto)	Best Latin Electronic Music Performance	Won	
Latin Recording Academy	2011	Shakira	Person of the Year	Honoree	
Latin Songwriters Hall of Fame (a.k.a. Premios La Musa)	2016	Shakira	Hall of Fame inductee	Nominated	
Latino Music Awards (Colombia)	2021	Shakira	Best Pop Female Artist	Nominated	
Latino Music Awards (Colombia)	2022	Shakira	Best Pop Female Artist	Won	
Latino Music Awards (Colombia)	2023	Shakira	Best Pop Female Artist	Won	
Latino Music Awards (Colombia)	2023	Shakira	Artist of the Year	Won	
Latino Music Awards (Colombia)	2023	Shakira	Best Pop Producer	Nominated	
Latino Music Awards (Colombia)	2023	"TQG" (with Karol G)	Best Urban Song	Nominated	
Latino Music Awards (Colombia)	2023	"TQG" (with Karol G)	Best Viral Song of TikTok	Won	
Latino Music Awards (Colombia)	2023	"TQG" (with Karol G)	Best Urban Video	Won	
Latino Music Awards (Colombia)	2023	"TQG" (with Karol G)	Song of the Year	Won	
Latino Music Awards (Colombia)	2023	"Shakira: Bzrp Music Sessions, Vol. 53" (with Bizarrap)	Song of the Year	Nominated	
Latino Music Awards (Colombia)	2023	"Shakira: Bzrp Music Sessions, Vol. 53" (with Bizarrap)	Best Viral Song of TikTok	Nominated	
Latino Music Awards (Colombia)	2023	"Shakira: Bzrp Music Sessions, Vol. 53" (with Bizarrap)	Best Urban Pop Song	Won	
Latino Music Awards (Colombia)	2023	"Shakira: Bzrp Music Sessions, Vol. 53" (with Bizarrap)	Best Pop Song	Nominated	
Latino Music Awards (Colombia)	2023	"Acróstico"	Best Pop Song	Won	
Latino Music Awards (Colombia)	2023	"Monotonía" (with Ozuna)	Best Tropical Song	Nominated	
Latino Music Awards (Colombia)	2024	Shakira	Artist of the Year	Won	
Latino Music Awards (Colombia)	2024	Shakira	Best Viral Artist of TikTok	Won	
Latino Music Awards (Colombia)	2024	Shakira	Best Pop Female Artist	Won	
Latino Music Awards (Colombia)	2024	Shakira	Best Urban Pop Female Artist	Won	
Latino Music Awards (Colombia)	2024	Shakira	Best Urban Female Artist	Won	
Latino Music Awards (Colombia)	2024	Shakira	Best Regional Mexican Producer	Won	
Latino Music Awards (Colombia)	2024	Las Mujeres Ya No Lloran	Best Album	Won	
Latino Music Awards (Colombia)	2024	"Shakira: Bzrp Music Sessions, Vol. 53" (with Bizarrap)	Song of the Year	Won	
Latino Music Awards (Colombia)	2024	"Shakira: Bzrp Music Sessions, Vol. 53" (with Bizarrap)	Video of the Year	Won	
Latino Music Awards (Colombia)	2024	"TQG" (with Karol G)	Video of the Year	Nominated	
Latino Music Awards (Colombia)	2024	"TQG" (with Karol G)	Song of the Year	Nominated	
Latino Music Awards (Colombia)	2024	"TQG" (with Karol G)	Best Urban Song	Won	
Latino Music Awards (Colombia)	2024	"TQG" (with Karol G)	Best Urban Video	Won	
Latino Music Awards (Colombia)	2024	"TQG" (with Karol G)	Best Viral Song of TikTok	Nominated	
Latino Music Awards (Colombia)	2024	"Acróstico"	Best Viral Song of TikTok	Won	
Latino Music Awards (Colombia)	2024	"El Jefe" (with Fuerza Regida)	Best Regional Mexican Song	Won	
Latino Music Awards (Colombia)	2024	"El Jefe" (with Fuerza Regida)	Best Regional Mexican Video	Nominated	
Latino Music Awards (Colombia)	2025	"Soltera"	Video of the Year	Won	
Latino Music Awards (Colombia)	2025	"Soltera"	Song of the Year	Won	
Latino Music Awards (Colombia)	2025	"Soltera"	Best Song — Urban Pop Artist	Won	
Latino Music Awards (Colombia)	2025	"Puntería" (with Cardi B)	Best Song — Urban Pop Artist	Nominated	
Latino Music Awards (Colombia)	2025	"Puntería" (with Cardi B)	Best Video — Urban Pop Artist	Nominated	
Latino Music Awards (Colombia)	2025	"Soltera"	Best Video — Urban Pop Artist	Won	
Latino Music Awards (Colombia)	2025	Shakira	Best Female Pop Artist	Won	
Latino Music Awards (Colombia)	2025	Shakira	Artist of the Year	Won	
Latino Music Awards (Colombia)	2025	Shakira	Best Female Urban Pop Artist	Nominated	
Lo Nuestro Awards	1997	Shakira	Best Pop Female Artist	Won	
Lo Nuestro Awards	1997	Shakira	Best New Artist	Won	
Lo Nuestro Awards	1997	Pies Descalzos	Pop Album of the Year	Nominated	
Lo Nuestro Awards	1997	"Estoy Aquí"	Pop Song of the Year	Nominated	
Lo Nuestro Awards	1997	"Pies Descalzos, Sueños Blancos"	Video of the Year	Nominated	
Lo Nuestro Awards	1999	Shakira	Best Pop Female Artist	Won	
Lo Nuestro Awards	1999	Dónde Están los Ladrones?	Pop Album of the Year	Won	
Lo Nuestro Awards	1999	"Ciega, Sordomuda"	Pop Song of the Year	Nominated	
Lo Nuestro Awards	1999	"Ciega, Sordomuda"	Video of the Year	Nominated	
Lo Nuestro Awards	2000	Shakira	Best Pop Female Artist	Won	
Lo Nuestro Awards	2001	Shakira	Best Pop Female Artist	Nominated	
Lo Nuestro Awards	2001	Shakira	Best Rock Artist	Won	
Lo Nuestro Awards	2001	MTV Unplugged	Rock/Alternative Album of the Year	Won	
Lo Nuestro Awards	2002	Laundry Service	People's Choice Award: Favorite Rock Album	Won	
Lo Nuestro Awards	2003	Shakira	Best Pop Female Artist	Won	
Lo Nuestro Awards	2003	Shakira	People's Choice Award: Rock	Won	
Lo Nuestro Awards	2003	"Suerte"	Song of the Year	Nominated	
Lo Nuestro Awards	2004	Shakira	Best Pop Female Artist	Won	
Lo Nuestro Awards	2004	"Que Me Quedes Tú"	Song of the Year	Nominated	
Lo Nuestro Awards	2006	"La Tortura" (with Alejandro Sanz)	Pop Song of the Year	Won	
Lo Nuestro Awards	2006	Shakira and Alejandro Sanz	Group or Duo of the Year	Won	
Lo Nuestro Awards	2006	Fijación Oral, Vol. 1	Pop Album of the Year	Won	
Lo Nuestro Awards	2006	"No"	Clip of the Year	Nominated	
Lo Nuestro Awards	2007	Shakira	Best Pop Female Artist	Won	
Lo Nuestro Awards	2009	"Loba"	Video of the Year	Won	
Lo Nuestro Awards	2010	Shakira	Best Female Artist	Won	
Lo Nuestro Awards	2010	Shakira	Artist of the Year	Nominated	
Lo Nuestro Awards	2010	"Lo Hecho Está Hecho"	Pop Song of the Year	Nominated	
Lo Nuestro Awards	2012	Shakira	Artist of the Year	Won	
Lo Nuestro Awards	2012	Shakira	Best Pop Female Artist	Won	
Lo Nuestro Awards	2012	"Rabiosa" (Shakira featuring El Cata)	Pop Song of the Year	Won	
Lo Nuestro Awards	2012	"Rabiosa" (Shakira featuring El Cata)	Best Collaboration of the Year	Nominated	
Lo Nuestro Awards	2012	"Sale el Sol"	Pop Song of the Year	Nominated	
Lo Nuestro Awards	2012	Sale el Sol	Pop Album of the Year	Won	
Lo Nuestro Awards	2013	Shakira	Best Pop Female Artist	Nominated	
Lo Nuestro Awards	2015	Shakira	Best Pop Female Artist	Won	
Lo Nuestro Awards	2016	"Mi Verdad" (Maná featuring Shakira)	Collaboration of the Year	Nominated	
Lo Nuestro Awards	2016	"Mi Verdad" (Maná featuring Shakira)	Pop Song of the Year	Nominated	
Lo Nuestro Awards	2016	"Mi Verdad" (Maná featuring Shakira)	Video of the Year	Nominated	
Lo Nuestro Awards	2016	Shakira	Best Pop Female Artist	Nominated	
Lo Nuestro Awards	2017	"La Bicicleta" (with Carlos Vives)	Single of the Year	Won	
Lo Nuestro Awards	2017	"La Bicicleta" (with Carlos Vives)	Video of the Year	Won	
Lo Nuestro Awards	2017	"La Bicicleta" (with Carlos Vives)	Tropical Song of the Year	Won	
Lo Nuestro Awards	2019	Shakira	Pop/Rock Artist of the Year	Nominated	
Lo Nuestro Awards	2019	"Clandestino" (Shakira featuring Maluma)	Pop/Rock Collaboration of the Year	Nominated	
Lo Nuestro Awards	2019	El Dorado World Tour	Tour of the Year	Nominated	
Lo Nuestro Awards	2021	Shakira	Pop Artist of the Year	Nominated	
Lo Nuestro Awards	2021	"Me Gusta" (with Anuel AA)	Urban/Pop Song of the Year	Nominated	
Lo Nuestro Awards	2021	"Girl Like Me" (with Black Eyed Peas)	Collaboration Crossover Of The Year	Nominated	
Lo Nuestro Awards	2023	Shakira	Female Pop Artist of the Year	Won	
Lo Nuestro Awards	2023	"Te Felicito" (with Rauw Alejandro)	Pop Collaboration of the Year	Won	
Lo Nuestro Awards	2023	"Te Felicito" (with Rauw Alejandro)	Urban/Pop Song of the Year	Won	
Lo Nuestro Awards	2024	Shakira	Female Pop Artist of the Year	Won	
Lo Nuestro Awards	2024	"Shakira: Bzrp Music Sessions, Vol. 53" (with Bizarrap)	Song of the Year	Won	
Lo Nuestro Awards	2024	"Shakira: Bzrp Music Sessions, Vol. 53" (with Bizarrap)	Urban/Pop Collaboration of the Year	Won	
Lo Nuestro Awards	2024	"TQG" (with Karol G)	Urban/Pop Song of the Year	Won	
Lo Nuestro Awards	2024	Shakira	Artist of the Year	Nominated	
Lo Nuestro Awards	2025	Shakira	Pop Female Artist of the Year	Won	
Lo Nuestro Awards	2025	Shakira	Artist of the Year	Nominated	
Lo Nuestro Awards	2025	Las Mujeres Ya No Lloran	Album of the Year	Won	
Lo Nuestro Awards	2025	Las Mujeres Ya No Lloran	Pop-Urban Album of the Year	Won	
Lo Nuestro Awards	2025	"Puntería" (with Cardi B)	Song of the Year	Nominated	
Lo Nuestro Awards	2025	"Puntería" (with Cardi B)	Crossover Collaboration of the Year	Won	
Lo Nuestro Awards	2025	"Puntería" (with Cardi B)	Pop-Urban Collaboration of the Year	Won	
Lo Nuestro Awards	2025	"(Entre Paréntesis)" (with Grupo Frontera)	The Perfect Mix of the Year	Nominated	
Lo Nuestro Awards	2025	"(Entre Paréntesis)" (with Grupo Frontera)	Mexican Music Collaboration of the Year	Won	
Los 40 Music Awards	2006	Shakira	Best International Artist	Won	
Los 40 Music Awards	2006	"Hips Don't Lie" (Shakira featuring Wyclef Jean)	Best International Song	Won	
Los 40 Music Awards	2007	"Las de la Intuición"	Best Latin Song	Nominated	
Los 40 Music Awards	2009	Shakira	Best International Artist In Spanish Language	Won	
Los 40 Music Awards	2009	"Loba"	Best International Song In Spanish Language	Won	
Los 40 Music Awards	2010	Shakira	Best International Artist In Spanish Language	Won	
Los 40 Music Awards	2010	"Waka Waka (This Time for Africa)"	Best International Song In Spanish Language	Nominated	
Los 40 Music Awards	2011	"Rabiosa"	Best International Song In Spanish Language	Nominated	
Los 40 Music Awards	2011	"Loca"	Best International Song In Spanish Language	Nominated	
Los 40 Music Awards	2011	Shakira	Best International Artist In Spanish Language	Won	
Los 40 Music Awards	2012	Shakira	Best International Artist In Spanish Language	Won	
Los 40 Music Awards	2014	Shakira	Best Latin Artist or Group	Nominated	
Los 40 Music Awards	2016	Shakira	Golden Award: International Artist	Gold	
Los 40 Music Awards	2016	Shakira	Los 40 Global Show Award	Nominated	
Los 40 Music Awards	2016	"La Bicicleta" (with Carlos Vives)	Golden Award: Best Song	Gold	
Los 40 Music Awards	2017	Shakira	Best Latin Artist	Nominated	
Los 40 Music Awards	2017	"Me Enamoré"	Los 40 Global Show Award	Nominated	
Los 40 Music Awards	2017	"Y, ¿Si Fuera Ella?"	Video of the Year	Nominated	
Los 40 Music Awards	2022	"Don't You Worry" (with Black Eyed Peas & David Guetta)	Best Song — International	Nominated	
Los 40 Music Awards	2022	"Don't You Worry" (with Black Eyed Peas & David Guetta)	Best Collaboration — International	Nominated	
Los 40 Music Awards	2022	"Te Felicito" (with Rauw Alejandro)	Best Collaboration — Global Latin	Nominated	
Los 40 Music Awards	2022	"Te Felicito" (with Rauw Alejandro)	Best Video — Global Latin	Won	
Los 40 Music Awards	2022	"Te Felicito" (with Rauw Alejandro)	Best Song — Global Latin	Nominated	
Los 40 Music Awards	2022	Shakira	Best Act — Global Latin	Nominated	
Los 40 Music Awards	2023	Shakira	Golden Music Award	Gold	
Los 40 Music Awards	2023	Shakira	Best Latin Artist or Group	Nominated	
Los 40 Music Awards	2023	"Copa Vacía" (with Manuel Turizo)	Best Latin Music Video	Nominated	
Los 40 Music Awards	2023	"Shakira: Bzrp Music Sessions, Vol. 53" (with Bizarrap)	Best Latin Music Video	Nominated	
Los 40 Music Awards	2023	"TQG" (with Karol G)	Best Latin Music Video	Nominated	
Los 40 Music Awards	2023	"TQG" (with Karol G)	Best Urban Latin Collaboration	Nominated	
Los 40 Music Awards	2023	"Shakira: Bzrp Music Sessions, Vol. 53" (with Bizarrap)	Best Urban Latin Collaboration	Nominated	
Los 40 Music Awards	2024	Las Mujeres Ya No Lloran	Best Album — Global Latin	Nominated	
Los 40 Music Awards	2024	"Puntería" (with Cardi B)	Best Video — Global Latin	Nominated	
Los 40 Music Awards	2024	"Puntería" (with Cardi B)	Best Collaboration — Global Latin	Nominated	
Los 40 Principales Ballantine Awards	2012	Shakira	Best Artist or Group in Spanish	Nominated	
Los 40 América Veracruz Awards	2012	Shakira	Best Artist or Group in Spanish	Nominated	
Lunas del Auditorio	2003	Shakira	Best Spanish Pop Act	Won	
Lunas del Auditorio	2007	Shakira	Best Spanish Pop Act	Won	
Lunas del Auditorio	2008	Shakira	Best Spanish Pop Act	Nominated	
Lunas del Auditorio	2011	Shakira	Best Spanish Pop Act	Nominated	
Lunas del Auditorio	2012	Shakira	Best Spanish Pop Act	Nominated	
MAD Video Music Awards	2024	Shakira	MAD RADIO 106.2: International Artist of the Year	Won	
Mara de Oro Awards	—N/a	Shakira	International Mara de Oro	Gold	
Miami Life Awards	2007	Shakira	International Female Artist	Nominated	
Miami Life Awards	2007	Oral Fixation Tour	Concert of the Year	Nominated	
Monitor Latino Award	2010	Shakira	Most Acclaimed Artist	Nominated	
Monitor Latino Award	2010	Shakira	Pop Artist of the Year	Nominated	
Monitor Latino Award	2010	Shakira	Highest Grossing Artist of the Year	Nominated	
Monitor Latino Award	2010	Shakira	Most Spectacular Artist of the Year	Nominated	
Monitor Latino Award	2010	Shakira	Pop Solo Female Artist of the Year	Nominated	
Monitor Latino Award	2010	"Loba/She Wolf"	Pop Song of the Year	Nominated	
Monitor Latino Award	2010	"Loba/She Wolf"	Pop Hot Song of the Year	Nominated	
Monitor Latino Award	2010	"Loba/She Wolf"	Pop Video of the Year	Nominated	
Monitor Latino Award	2010	"Lo hecho está hecho"	Pop Video of the Year	Nominated	
Monitor Latino Award	2010	"Lo hecho está hecho"	Pop Song of the Year, Female	Nominated	
Monitor Latino Award	2010	Loba	Album of the Year	Nominated	
Monitor Latino Award	2020	Shakira	Pop Artist of the Year	Won	
Monitor Latino Award	2020	"Tutu Remix" (Camilo and Pedro Capó featuring Shakira)	Collaboration of the Year	Nominated	
Monitor Latino Award	2020	"Tutu Remix" (Camilo and Pedro Capó featuring Shakira)	Pop Song of the Year	Nominated	
Monitor Latino Award	2020	"Me Gusta" (with Anuel AA)	Pop Song of the Year	Nominated	
Monitor Latino Award	2021	Shakira	Latin Female Artist	Nominated	
MTV Asia Awards	2003	Shakira	Favorite Breakthrough Artist	Nominated	
MTV Asia Awards	2003	Shakira	Favorite Female Artist	Nominated	
MTV Asia Awards	2008	"Beautiful Liar" (with Beyoncé)	Best Hook Up	Nominated	
MTV Europe Music Awards	2002	Shakira	Best New Act	Nominated	
MTV Europe Music Awards	2002	Shakira	Best Female	Nominated	
MTV Europe Music Awards	2002	Shakira	Best Pop	Nominated	
MTV Europe Music Awards	2002	"Whenever, Wherever"	Best Song	Nominated	
MTV Europe Music Awards	2005	Shakira	Best Pop	Nominated	
MTV Europe Music Awards	2005	Shakira	Best Female	Won	
MTV Europe Music Awards	2006	Shakira	Best Pop	Nominated	
MTV Europe Music Awards	2006	Shakira	Best Female	Nominated	
MTV Europe Music Awards	2006	"Hips Don't Lie" (Shakira featuring Wyclef Jean)	Best Song	Nominated	
MTV Europe Music Awards	2007	"Beautiful Liar" (with Beyoncé)	Most Addictive track	Nominated	
MTV Europe Music Awards	2009	"She Wolf"	Best Video	Nominated	
MTV Europe Music Awards	2009	Shakira	Best Female	Nominated	
MTV Europe Music Awards	2010	Shakira	Best Female	Nominated	
MTV Europe Music Awards	2010	Shakira	Free Your Mind	Honoree	
MTV Europe Music Awards	2021	Shakira	Best Latin	Nominated	
MTV Europe Music Awards	2021	"Girl Like Me" (with Black Eyed Peas)	Best Collaboration	Nominated	
MTV Europe Music Awards	2022	Shakira	Best Latin	Nominated	
MTV Europe Music Awards	2022	"Te Felicito" (with Rauw Alejandro)	Best Collaboration	Nominated	
MTV Europe Music Awards	2023	Shakira	Best Latin	Nominated	
MTV Europe Music Awards	2023	"TQG" (with Karol G)	Best Collaboration	Won	
MTV Europe Music Awards	2024	Shakira	Best Latin	Nominated	
MTV Italian Music Awards	2011	Shakira	Too Much Award	Nominated	
MTV Italian Music Awards	2011	Shakira	Wonder Woman Award	Nominated	
MTV Italian Music Awards	2014	"Can't Remember to Forget You" (with Rihanna)	Best Video	Nominated	
MTV Latin America	1999	Shakira	Best Singer of the Decade (90's)	2nd place	
MTV MIAW Awards	2014	Shakira	Colombian Twitter Star Of The Year	Nominated	
MTV MIAW Awards	2017	"Chantaje" (featuring Maluma)	Collaboration of the Year	Nominated	
MTV MIAW Awards	2017	"La Bicicleta" (with Carlos Vives)	Best Party Anthem	Nominated	
MTV MIAW Awards	2018	Shakira	Artist + Duro — Colombia	Nominated	
MTV MIAW Awards	2023	Shakira	Loba (She Wolf) of the Year	Nominated	
MTV MIAW Awards	2023	Shakira shades Gerard Piqué	Viral Bomb	Nominated	
MTV MIAW Awards	2023	"Shakira: Bzrp Music Sessions, Vol. 53" (with Bizarrap)	Music Ship of the Year	Nominated	
MTV MIAW Awards	2023	"Shakira: Bzrp Music Sessions, Vol. 53" (with Bizarrap)	Viral Anthem	Nominated	
MTV MIAW Awards	2023	"TQG" (with Karol G)	Global Hit of the Year	Won	
MTV MIAW Awards Brazil	2021	"Girl Like Me" (with Black Eyed Peas)	Global Collaboration	Nominated	
MTV Video Music Awards	2000	"Ojos Así"	International Viewer's Choice — Latin America (North)	Won	
MTV Video Music Awards	2000	"Ojos Así"	International Viewer's Choice — Latin America (South)	Nominated	
MTV Video Music Awards	2002	"Whenever, Wherever/Suerte"	Best Female Video	Nominated	
MTV Video Music Awards	2002	"Whenever, Wherever/Suerte"	Best Pop Video	Nominated	
MTV Video Music Awards	2002	"Whenever, Wherever/Suerte"	Best Dance Video	Nominated	
MTV Video Music Awards	2002	"Whenever, Wherever/Suerte"	Best Cinematography	Nominated	
MTV Video Music Awards	2002	"Whenever, Wherever/Suerte"	International Viewer's Choice — MTV Latin America (North)	Won	
MTV Video Music Awards	2002	"Whenever, Wherever/Suerte"	International Viewer's Choice — Latin America (Pacific)	Nominated	
MTV Video Music Awards	2002	"Whenever, Wherever/Suerte"	International Viewer's Choice — Latin America (Atlantic)	Nominated	
MTV Video Music Awards	2005	"La Tortura" (with Alejandro Sanz)	Best Female Video	Nominated	
MTV Video Music Awards	2005	"La Tortura" (with Alejandro Sanz)	Viewer's Choice	Nominated	
MTV Video Music Awards	2005	"La Tortura" (with Alejandro Sanz)	Best Dance Video	Nominated	
MTV Video Music Awards	2006	"Hips Don't Lie" (Shakira featuring Wyclef Jean)	Best Female Video	Nominated	
MTV Video Music Awards	2006	"Hips Don't Lie" (Shakira featuring Wyclef Jean)	Best Pop Video	Nominated	
MTV Video Music Awards	2006	"Hips Don't Lie" (Shakira featuring Wyclef Jean)	Best Dance Video	Nominated	
MTV Video Music Awards	2006	"Hips Don't Lie" (Shakira featuring Wyclef Jean)	Video of the Year	Nominated	
MTV Video Music Awards	2006	"Hips Don't Lie" (Shakira featuring Wyclef Jean)	Viewer's Choice	Nominated	
MTV Video Music Awards	2006	"Hips Don't Lie" (Shakira featuring Wyclef Jean)	Best Choreography	Won	
MTV Video Music Awards	2007	"Beautiful Liar" (with Beyoncé)	Most Earthshattering Collaboration	Won	
MTV Video Music Awards	2007	"Beautiful Liar" (with Beyoncé)	Best Choreography	Nominated	
MTV Video Music Awards	2007	"Beautiful Liar" (with Beyoncé)	Best Editing	Nominated	
MTV Video Music Awards	2018	"Chantaje" (featuring Maluma)	Best Latin	Nominated	
MTV Video Music Awards	2021	"Girl Like Me"	Best Latin	Nominated	
MTV Video Music Awards	2023	Shakira	Video Vanguard Award	Honoree	
MTV Video Music Awards	2023	Shakira	Artist of the Year	Nominated	
MTV Video Music Awards	2023	"TQG" (with Karol G)	Best Collaboration	Won	
MTV Video Music Awards	2023	"TQG" (with Karol G)	Best Latin	Nominated	
"Acróstico"	2023	Nominated	Best Latin		
2025	"Soltera"	Best Latin	Won		
MTV Video Music Awards Japan	2008	"Beautiful Liar" (with Beyoncé)	Best Collaboration	Nominated	
MTV Video Music Awards Latin America	2002	"Suerte"	Video of the Year	Won	
MTV Video Music Awards Latin America	2002	Shakira	Artist of the Year	Won	
MTV Video Music Awards Latin America	2002	Shakira	Best Artist—North	Won	
MTV Video Music Awards Latin America	2002	Shakira	Female Artist of the Year	Won	
MTV Video Music Awards Latin America	2002	Shakira	Pop Artist of the Year	Won	
MTV Video Music Awards Latin America	2005	Shakira	Artist of the Year	Won	
MTV Video Music Awards Latin America	2005	Shakira	Best Artist — Central	Won	
MTV Video Music Awards Latin America	2005	Shakira	Best Pop Artist	Won	
MTV Video Music Awards Latin America	2005	Shakira	Best Female Artist	Won	
MTV Video Music Awards Latin America	2005	"La Tortura" (with Alejandro Sanz)	Video of the Year	Won	
MTV Video Music Awards Latin America	2005	"No"	Video of the Year	Nominated	
MTV Video Music Awards Latin America	2006	"Hips Don't Lie" (Shakira featuring Wyclef Jean)	Song of the Year	Won	
MTV Video Music Awards Latin America	2007	"Te Lo Agradezco, Pero No" (with Alejandro Sanz)	Video of the Year	Nominated	
MTV Video Music Awards Latin America	2009	Shakira	Agente de Cambio	Honoree	
MTV Video Music Awards Latin America	2009	Shakira	Fashionista Award — Female	Nominated	
MTV Video Music Awards Latin America	2009	Shakira	Best Fan Club	Nominated	
MTV Video Music Awards Latin America	2009	"Loba"	Video of the Year	Nominated	
MTV Video Music Awards Latin America	2009	"Loba"	Song of the Year	Nominated	
MTV Video Play Awards	2010	"Waka Waka (This Time for Africa)"	Platinum video	Won	
MuchMusic Video Awards	2002	Shakira	Favourite International Artist	Won	
MuchMusic Video Awards	2002	"Whenever, Wherever"	Best International Artist Video	Won	
MuchMusic Video Awards	2007	"Beautiful Liar" (with Beyoncé)	Best International Artist Video	Nominated	
Musa Sprite Awards (Chile)	2023	Shakira	International Latin Artist	Nominated	
Musa Sprite Awards (Chile)	2023	"TQG" (with Karol G)	International Collaboration of the Year	Won	
Musa Sprite Awards (Chile)	2023	"TQG" (with Karol G)	International Latin Song	Won	
Musa Sprite Awards (Chile)	2023	"Shakira: Bzrp Music Sessions, Vol. 53" (with Bizarrap)	International Latin Song	Nominated	
Musa Sprite Awards (Chile)	2024	Shakira	International Latin Artist	Nominated	
Musa Sprite Awards (Chile)	2024	"Soltera"	International Latin Song	Nominated	
Music Week Awards	2015	Shakira+Activia	Music and Brand Partnership	Nominated	
Mü-Yap Awards	2003	Laundry Service	Best-Selling International Albums	Won	
Mü-Yap Awards	2008	"Beautiful Liar" (with Beyoncé)	Turkcell Award	Won	
NAACP Image Awards	2008	"Beautiful Liar" (with Beyoncé)	Outstanding Music Video	Won	
Napster Awards	2006	Shakira	Most-Played Latin Artist — U.S.	Won	
Napster Awards	2006	"Whenever, Wherever"	Most-Played Latin Song — U.S.	Won	
National Music Publishers' Association	2008	"Hips Don't Lie"	Songwriting Awards	Multi-Platinum	
National Music Publishers' Association	2010	"She Wolf"	Songwriting Awards	Platinum	
National Music Publishers' Association	2011	"Waka Waka (This Time for Africa)"	Songwriting Awards	Platinum	
National Music Publishers' Association	2018	"Dare (La La La)"	Songwriting Awards	Platinum	
National Music Publishers' Association	2022	"Underneath Your Clothes"	Songwriting Awards	Gold	
National Music Publishers' Association	2022	"Girl Like Me"	Songwriting Awards	Platinum	
National Music Publishers' Association	2022	"Whenever, Wherever"	Songwriting Awards	Multi-Platinum	
National Music Publishers' Association	2023	"Shakira: Bzrp Music Sessions, Vol. 53"	Songwriting Awards	Gold	
National Music Publishers' Association	2023	"Ojos Así"	Songwriting Awards	Gold	
National Music Publishers' Association	2023	"Ciega, Sordomuda"	Songwriting Awards	Gold	
National Recording Registry	2024	"Hips Don't Lie" (Shakira featuring Wyclef Jean)	Preservation	Nominated	
New York Festival TV & Film Awards	2020	Shakira in Concert: El Dorado World Tour	Gold Medal Award — Special Event	Gold	
New York Festival TV & Film Awards	2020	Shakira in Concert: El Dorado World Tour	Gold Medal Award — Performing Arts	Gold	
New York Festival TV & Film Awards	2020	Shakira in Concert: El Dorado World Tour	Feature Documentaries	Nominated	
New York Festival TV & Film Awards	2020	Shakira in Concert: El Dorado World Tour	Music	Nominated	
Neox Fan Awards	2014	Shakira & Gerard Piqué	Most Beautiful Selfie	Nominated	
Nickelodeon Argentina Kids' Choice Awards	2011	Shakira	Favorite Latin Artist	Nominated	
Nickelodeon Argentina Kids' Choice Awards	2011	"Loca"	Favorite Latin Song	Nominated	
Nickelodeon Argentina Kids' Choice Awards	2014	"La La La"	Favorite Latin Song	Nominated	
Nickelodeon Colombia Kids' Choice Awards	2014	"Nunca Me Acuerdo de Olvidarte"	Favorite Latin Song	Won	
Nickelodeon Colombia Kids' Choice Awards	2014	Shakira	Favorite Colombian Artist or Group	Nominated	
Nickelodeon Colombia Kids' Choice Awards	2016	"La Bicicleta" (with Carlos Vives)	Favorite Latin Song	Won	
Nickelodeon Mexico Kids' Choice Awards (Note: Originally known as "Mis Premios Nick Mexico")	2003	Shakira	Best International Group/Solo Artist	Nominated	
Nickelodeon Kids' Choice Awards	2007	"Hips Don't Lie" (Shakira featuring Wyclef Jean)	Favorite Song	Nominated	
Nickelodeon Kids' Choice Awards	2017	Shakira	Favorite Global Music Star	Nominated	
Nickelodeon Kids' Choice Awards	2023	"Don't You Worry" (with Black Eyed Peas & David Guetta)	Favorite Music Collaboration	Nominated	
NME Awards	2011	Shakira	Hottest Woman	Nominated	
Now! Awards	2018	"Hips Don't Lie" (Shakira featuring Wyclef Jean)	Best Now Collaboration	Nominated	
NRJ Music Awards	2003	Shakira	International Female Artist of the Year	Won	
NRJ Music Awards	2003	Laundry Service	International Album of the Year	Won	
NRJ Music Awards	2003	"Whenever, Wherever"	International Song of the Year	Won	
NRJ Music Awards	2006	Shakira	International Female Artist of the Year	Nominated	
NRJ Music Awards	2006	"La Tortura" (with Alejandro Sanz)	International Song of the Year	Won	
NRJ Music Awards	2007	Shakira	International Female Artist of the Year	Nominated	
NRJ Music Awards	2007	"Hips Don't Lie" (Shakira featuring Wyclef Jean)	International Song of the Year	Nominated	
NRJ Music Awards	2010	Shakira	International Female Artist of the Year	Nominated	
NRJ Music Awards	2011	Shakira	International Female Artist of the Year	Nominated	
NRJ Music Awards	2011	"Waka Waka (This Time for Africa)"	International Song of the Year	Won	
NRJ Music Awards	2012	Shakira	Lifetime Award	Honoree	
NRJ Music Awards	2014	Shakira	International Female Artist of the Year	Won	
NRJ Music Awards	2016	Shakira	International Female Artist of the Year	Nominated	
NRJ Music Awards	2017	Shakira	International Female Artist of the Year	Nominated	
NRJ Music Awards	2021	Shakira	International Female Artist of the Year	Nominated	
NRJ Music Awards	2021	"Girl Like Me" (with Black Eyed Peas)	International Collaboration of the Year	Nominated	
NRJ Music Awards	2022	Shakira	International Female Artist of the Year	Nominated	
NRJ Music Awards	2022	"Don't You Worry" (with Black Eyed Peas & David Guetta)	International Song of the Year	Nominated	
NRJ Music Awards	2022	"Don't You Worry" (with Black Eyed Peas & David Guetta)	International Collaboration of the Year	Nominated	
NRJ Music Awards	2022	"Don't You Worry" (with Black Eyed Peas & David Guetta)	International Video of the Year	Nominated	
NRJ Music Awards	2023	"TQG" (with Karol G)	International Collaboration of the Year	Nominated	
NRJ Music Awards	2023	Shakira	International Female Artist of the Year	Nominated	
NW Readers' Poll Awards	2002	Shakira	Female Artist of the Year	2nd place	
Orgullosamente Latino Award	2006	Shakira	Female Solo Artist	Won	
Orgullosamente Latino Award	2010	Shakira	Female Solo Artist	Won	
People's Choice Awards	2007	Shakira	Favorite Female Artist	Nominated	
People's Choice Awards	2007	"Hips Don't Lie" (Shakira featuring Wyclef Jean)	Favorite Pop Song	Won	
People's Choice Awards	2008	"Beautiful Liar" (with Beyoncé)	Favorite R&B Song	Nominated	
People's Choice Awards	2011	"Waka Waka (This Time for Africa)"	Favorite Music Video	Nominated	
People's Choice Awards	2017	Shakira	Favorite Social Media Celebrity	Nominated	
People's Choice Awards	2018	Shakira	Latin Artist of the Year	Nominated	
People's Choice Awards	2022	Shakira	Latin Artist of the Year	Nominated	
People's Choice Awards	2024	Shakira	Female Latin Artist of the Year	Won	
People's Choice Awards	2024	"TQG" (with Karol G)	Collaboration Song of the Year	Nominated	
People en Español Awards	2001	Shakira	Most Popular Artist in the United States	Won	
People en Español Awards	2008	Shakira	Humanitarian Award	Honoree	
People en Español Awards	2010	Shakira	Best Pop Singer or Group	Nominated	
People en Español Awards	2010	She Wolf	Album of the Year	Nominated	
People en Español Awards	2010	"She Wolf"	Comeback of the Year	Nominated	
People en Español Awards	2010	"Lo hecho está hecho"	Video of the Year	Nominated	
People en Español Awards	2010	"Waka Waka (This Time for Africa)"	Song of the Year	Won	
People en Español Awards	2011	Sale el Sol	Best Album	Nominated	
People en Español Awards	2011	"Rabiosa"	Song of the Year	Won	
People en Español Awards	2011	"Local"	Best Cover	Won	
People en Español Awards	2011	Shakira & Gerard Piqué	Couple of the Year	Won	
People en Español Awards	2012	Shakira	Best Female Singer	Won	
People en Español Awards	2012	Shakira	Queen of Twitter	Nominated	
People en Español Awards	2012	Shakira	Queen of Facebook	Nominated	
People en Español Awards	2013	Shakira & Gerard Piqué	Most Sociable Couple	Won	
People en Español Awards	2013	Shakira (Milan)	Photography of the Year	Won	
People en Español Awards	2013	Shakira (Milan)	Baby of the Year	Nominated	
People en Español Awards	2013	Shakira	Most Beautiful in Instagram	Nominated	
Polish Society of the Phonographic Industry Awards (ZPAV)	2011	"Waka Waka (This Time for Africa)"	Foreign Digital Song of the Year	Won	
Pollstar Awards	2019	El Dorado World Tour	Best Latin Tour	Won	
Premios Amigo	1997	Shakira	Best Solo Female Latin Artist	Nominated	
Premios Amigo	1999	Shakira	Best Solo Female Latin Artist	Won	
Premios Amigo	2002	Shakira	Best Solo Female Latin Artist	Won	
Premios Amigo	2007	"Pure Intuition"	Vodafone — Most Downloaded Song	Nominated	
Premios Gardel	1999	Shakira	Best Female Latin Artist	Won	
Premios Gardel	1999	Dónde Están los Ladrones?	Latin Album of the Year	Won	
Premios Gardel	2001	MTV Unplugged	Best Female Latin Album	Won	
Premios Gardel	2024	"Shakira: Bzrp Music Sessions, Vol. 53" (with Bizarrap)	Song of the Year	Nominated	
Premios Gardel	2024	"Shakira: Bzrp Music Sessions, Vol. 53" (with Bizarrap)	Record of the Year	Nominated	
Premios Gardel	2024	"Shakira: Bzrp Music Sessions, Vol. 53" (with Bizarrap)	Best Urban Pop Song	Won	
Premios Gardel	2024	"Shakira: Bzrp Music Sessions, Vol. 53" (with Bizarrap)	Collaboration of the Year	Won	
Premios Mixup	2001	Shakira	Spanish-language Female Artist	Nominated	
Premios Odeón	2024	"Shakira: Bzrp Music Sessions, Vol. 53" (with Bizarrap)	Best Latin Song	Honoree	
Premios Portafolio	2022	Barefoot Foundation	Aporte a la Comunidad	Honoree	
Premios Nuestra Tierra	2007	Shakira	Best Pop Artist of the Year	Won	
Premios Nuestra Tierra	2007	Shakira	Best Pop Performance of the Year	Nominated	
Premios Nuestra Tierra	2007	Shakira	Best Artist of the Year	Won	
Premios Nuestra Tierra	2007	"Hips Don't Lie" (Shakira featuring Wyclef Jean)	Best Urban Performance of the Year	Won	
Premios Nuestra Tierra	2007	Fijación Oral, Vol. 1	Best Album of the Year	Nominated	
Premios Nuestra Tierra	2007	"La Pared"	Best Song of the Year	Nominated	
Premios Nuestra Tierra	2008	"Hay Amores"	Best Movie Soundtrack	Won	
Premios Nuestra Tierra	2010	Shakira	Best Pop Solo Artist or Group	Nominated	
Premios Nuestra Tierra	2010	Shakira	Best Singer of the Year (Public)	Nominated	
Premios Nuestra Tierra	2011	Shakira	Best Artist of the Year	Nominated	
Premios Nuestra Tierra	2011	Shakira	Best Singer of the Year (Public)	Nominated	
Premios Nuestra Tierra	2011	Shakira	Best Pop Artist of the Year	Nominated	
Premios Nuestra Tierra	2011	Shakira	Twitterer of the Year	Nominated	
Premios Nuestra Tierra	2011	Shakira	Best Fan Club	Nominated	
Premios Nuestra Tierra	2011	Sale el Sol	Album of the Year	Nominated	
Premios Nuestra Tierra	2011	"Loca"	Best Music Video of the Year (Colombian)	Won	
Premios Nuestra Tierra	2011	"Waka Waka (This Time For Africa)"	Best Song of the Year	Nominated	
Premios Nuestra Tierra	2011	"Waka Waka (This Time For Africa)"	Best Song of the Year (Public)	Nominated	
Premios Nuestra Tierra	2012	Shakira	Best Artist of the Year	Nominated	
Premios Nuestra Tierra	2012	Shakira	Best Pop Solo Artist or Group	Nominated	
Premios Nuestra Tierra	2012	Shakira	Best Singer of the Year (Public)	Nominated	
Premios Nuestra Tierra	2012	Shakira	Twitterer of the Year	Nominated	
Premios Nuestra Tierra	2012	"Antes de las Seis"	Best Pop Performance of the Year	Nominated	
Premios Nuestra Tierra	2021	Shakira	Artist of the Year	Nominated	
Premios Nuestra Tierra	2021	Shakira	Artista Imagen de Nuestra Tierra en el Mundo	Won	
Premios Nuestra Tierra	2021	Super Bowl LIV halftime show	Best Performance — Live, Virtual or TV	Won	
Premios Nuestra Tierra	2021	"Girl Like Me" (with Black Eyed Peas)	Best Electro-Dance Song	Won	
Premios Nuestra Tierra	2021	"Girl Like Me" (with Black Eyed Peas)	Best Video	Nominated	
Premios Nuestra Tierra	2021	"Girl Like Me" (with Black Eyed Peas)	Favorite Song (Public)	Nominated	
Premios Nuestra Tierra	2022	"Don't Wait Up"	Best Electro-Dance Song	Nominated	
Premios Nuestra Tierra	2023	Shakira	Artist of the Year	Nominated	
Premios Nuestra Tierra	2023	Shakira	Artista Imagen De Nuestra Tierra En El Mundo	Nominated	
Premios Nuestra Tierra	2023	"Te Felicito" (with Rauw Alejandro)	Best Pop Song	Won	
Premios Nuestra Tierra	2023	"Te Felicito" (with Rauw Alejandro)	Best Electronic/Dance Song	Nominated	
Premios Nuestra Tierra	2023	"Te Felicito" (with Rauw Alejandro)	Best Video of the Year	Nominated	
Premios Nuestra Tierra	2023	"Te Felicito" (with Rauw Alejandro)	Best Song of the Year	Nominated	
Premios Nuestra Tierra	2023	"Monotonía" (with Ozuna)	Best Song of the Year	Nominated	
Premios Nuestra Tierra	2024	Shakira	Artist of the Year	Nominated	
Premios Nuestra Tierra	2024	Shakira	Artista Imagen de Nuestra Tierra en el Mundo	Nominated	
Premios Nuestra Tierra	2024	Shakira	Best Pop Female Artist	Nominated	
Premios Nuestra Tierra	2024	Acróstico	Song of the Year	Nominated	
Premios Nuestra Tierra	2024	Acróstico	Best Pop Song	Nominated	
Premios Nuestra Tierra	2024	"Shakira: Bzrp Music Sessions, Vol. 53" (with Bizarrap)	Song of the Year	Nominated	
Premios Nuestra Tierra	2024	"Shakira: Bzrp Music Sessions, Vol. 53" (with Bizarrap)	Best Dance/Electronic Song	Won	
Premios Nuestra Tierra	2024	"Shakira: Bzrp Music Sessions, Vol. 53" (with Bizarrap)	Best Urban Collaboration	Nominated	
Premios Nuestra Tierra	2024	"TQG" (with Karol G)	Best Urban Song	Nominated	
Premios Nuestra Tierra	2024	"TQG" (with Karol G)	Video of the Year	Won	
Premios Nuestra Tierra	2024	"TQG" (with Karol G)	Best Urban Collaboration	Won	
Premios Nuestra Tierra	2025	Shakira	Mujer Raíz de Nuestra Tierra	Nominated	
Premios Nuestra Tierra	2025	Las Mujeres Ya No Lloran	Album of the Year	Nominated	
Premios Nuestra Tierra	2025	"Bzrp Music Sessions, Vol. 53" (with Tiësto and Bizarrap)	Best Dance/Electropop Song	Nominated	
Premios Ondas	2002	Shakira	Best Latin Artist or Group	Won	
Premios Ondas	2006	Shakira	Best International Artist or Group	Won	
Premios Ondas	2010	Shakira	Best International Artist or Latin Group	Won	
Premios Oye!	2002	Shakira	Best International Female Artist	Won	
Premios Oye!	2002	Shakira	Best Pop Female Artist	Won	
Premios Oye!	2002	Shakira	Best Spanish Breakthrough of the Year	Nominated	
Premios Oye!	2005	Fijación Oral, Vol. 1	Latin Pop Female	Won	
Premios Oye!	2006	"Hips Don't Lie" (Shakira featuring Wyclef Jean)	Best Spanish Song of the Year	Won	
Premios Oye!	2006	"Hips Don't Lie" (Shakira featuring Wyclef Jean)	Best English Song of the Year	Won	
Premios Oye!	2006	"Hips Don't Lie" (Shakira featuring Wyclef Jean)	Video of the Year	Won	
Premios Oye!	2006	Oral Fixation, Vol. 2	Best English Record of the Year	Won	
Premios Oye!	2006	"Día de Enero"	Premio Social a la Música	Honoree	
Premios Oye!	2007	"Te Lo Agradezco, Pero No" (with Alejandro Sanz)	Best Spanish Song of the Year	Won	
Premios Oye!	2007	"Beautiful Liar" (with Beyoncé)	Best English Song of the Year	Nominated	
Premios Oye!	2010	Shakira	Female Artist of the Year	Nominated	
Premios Oye!	2010	She Wolf	Best Spanish Album of the Year	Nominated	
Premios Oye!	2012	Shakira	Female Artist of the Year	Nominated	
Premios Oye!	2012	Sale el Sol	Best Spanish Album of the Year	Nominated	
Premios Shangay	2010	Shakira	Best International Artist	Won	
Premios SHOCK	1996	Shakira	Best Songwriter	Won	
Premios SHOCK	1996	Pies Descalzos	Best Album	Won	
Premios SHOCK	1999	Shakira	Person of the Year	Won	
Premios SHOCK	1999	Shakira	Best Music Composer	Won	
Premios SHOCK	1999	Shakira	Best Artist	Won	
Premios SHOCK	1999	Shakira	Artist of the Millennium	Honoree	
Premios SHOCK	1999	Dónde Están los Ladrones?	Best Album	Won	
Premios SHOCK	2005	Shakira	Best Colombian International Artist	Won	
Premios SHOCK	2005	"La Tortura" (with Alejandro Sanz)	Best Radio Song	Won	
Premios SHOCK	2005	Fijación Oral, Vol. 1	Best Album of the Year	Won	
Premios SHOCK	2009	"Loba"	Best Radio Song	Nominated	
Premios SHOCK	2010	"Waka Waka (This Time for Africa)"	Best Radio Song	Nominated	
Premios SHOCK	2010	She Wolf	Album of the Year	Nominated	
Premios SHOCK	2011	Shakira	Shock Artist of the Decade	Nominated	
Premios SHOCK	2016	"La Bicicleta" (with Carlos Vives)	Best Commercial Radio Song	Won	
Premios Tú Mundo Urbano	2023	Shakira	Top Artist - Pop Urban	Nominated	
Premios Tú Mundo Urbano	2023	"TQG" (with Karol G)	Collaboration of the Year	Nominated	
Premios Tú Mundo Urbano	2023	"Te Felicito" (with Rauw Alejandro)	Top Song - Pop Urban	Nominated	
Premios Tú Mundo Urbano	2023	"Shakira: Bzrp Music Sessions, Vol. 53" (with Bizarrap)	Top Song - Pop Urban	Nominated	
Premios TVyNovelas (Colombia)	1994	Shakira	Best National Artist	Won	
Premios TVyNovelas (Colombia)	1994	Shakira	Best Cola (Ass) in Colombia	Won	
Premios TVyNovelas (Colombia)	1999	Shakira	Artist of the Century	Honoree	
Premios TVyNovelas (Mexico)	2017	"Mi Verdad" (Maná featuring Shakira)	Best Musical Theme	Nominated	
Primetime Emmy Awards	2020	Super Bowl LIV halftime show	Outstanding Variety Special (Live)	Nominated	
Prisma de Diamante	1996	Shakira	One Million Copies	Won	
PureChart Awards	2024	Shakira	Foreign Female Artist of the Year	Nominated	
PureChart Awards	2024	"Shakira: Bzrp Music Sessions, Vol. 53" (with Bizarrap)	Foreign Song of the Year	Nominated	
Quiero Awards (Argentina)	2009	"Loba"	Video of the Year — Female Artist	Won	
Quiero Awards (Argentina)	2009	"Loba"	Video of the Year	Won	
Quiero Awards (Argentina)	2010	"Loba"	Video of the Year — Female Artist	Won	
Quiero Awards (Argentina)	2011	"Sale El Sol"	Video of the Year — Female Artist	Nominated	
Quiero Awards (Argentina)	2011	"Rabiosa" (Shakira featuring El Cata)	Best Video of the Year	Nominated	
Quiero Awards (Argentina)	2012	"Addicted to You"	Best Music Video — Female	Nominated	
Quiero Awards (Argentina)	2014	"Dare (La La La)"	Best Choreography	Nominated	
Quiero Awards (Argentina)	2014	"Nunca Me Acuerdo de Olvidarte"	Best Pop Video	Nominated	
Quiero Awards (Argentina)	2014	"Nunca Me Acuerdo de Olvidarte"	Video of the Year — Female Artist	Nominated	
Quiero Awards (Argentina)	2015	"Mi Verdad" (Maná featuring Shakira)	Best Collaboration	Nominated	
Quiero Awards (Argentina)	2016	Shakira	Best Music Instagramer	Nominated	
Quiero Awards (Argentina)	2016	"No Soy Una De Esas"	Best Pop Video	Nominated	
Quiero Awards (Argentina)	2016	"La Bicicleta" (with Carlos Vives)	Best Pop Video	Won	
Quiero Awards (Argentina)	2017	"Me Enamoré"	Video of the Year — Female Artist	Nominated	
Quiero Awards (Argentina)	2018	"Clandestino" (Shakira featuring Maluma)	Best Foreign Collaboration	Nominated	
Quiero Awards (Argentina)	2018	Shakira	Best Instragramer — Musician	Nominated	
Quiero Awards (Argentina)	2022	"Te Felicito" (with Rauw Alejandro)	Best Video of the Year	Nominated	
Quiero Awards (Argentina)	2022	"Te Felicito" (with Rauw Alejandro)	Best Pop Video	Nominated	
Radio Disney Music Awards	2014	Shakira	Hero Award	Honoree	
Ritmo Latino Awards (Note: Also known as "Premio de la Gente" or Latin Music Fan Awards.)	1999	Shakira	Artist of the Year	Won	
Ritmo Latino Awards	1999	Shakira	Female Pop Artist or Group	Won	
Ritmo Latino Awards	2001	Shakira	Female Pop Artist or Group	Nominated	
Ritmo Latino Awards	2001	Shakira	Most Popular Artist in the United States (Male or Female)	Nominated	
Ritmo Latino Awards	2001	Shakira	Rock en Español Artist or Group	Won	
Ritmo Latino Awards	2002	"Suerte"	Video of the Year	Won	
Ritmo Latino Entertainment Awards	2025	Shakira	Favorite Pop Artist	Won	
Rolling Stone en Español Awards (RSEE Awards)	2023	Shakira	Artist of the Year	Nominated	
Rolling Stone en Español Awards (RSEE Awards)	2023	"Monotonía" (with Ozuna)	Song of the Year	Nominated	
Rolling Stone Music Awards	2002	Shakira	Best Female Performer	Nominated	
Rolling Stone Music Awards	2002	Shakira	Best New Artist	Nominated	
Soberano Awards (Dominican Republic)	1997	Shakira	Best Female Singer	Won	
Soberano Awards (Dominican Republic)	1998	Shakira	Soberano Internacional	Won	
Soberano Awards (Dominican Republic)	1999	Dónde Están los Ladrones?	Best Album of the Year	Won	
Spotify Awards	2020	Shakira	Most-Streamed Female Artist	Nominated	
Spotify Awards	2020	Shakira	Most-Streamed Pop-Urban Artist	Nominated	
Spotify Awards	2020	Shakira	Most listened to by users aged 30 to 44 years old	Nominated	
Spotify Awards	2020	Shakira	Most listened to by users over 45 years old	Nominated	
Super Estrella de Oro (Colombia)	1992	Shakira	Best New Barranquilla Singer of 1991	Won	
Super Estrella de Oro (Colombia)	1996	Shakira	Best Singer	Nominated	
Super Estrella de Oro (Colombia)	1996	"Estoy Aquí"	Best Video	Won	
Super Estrella de Oro (Colombia)	1996	"Estoy Aquí"	Best Selling Record	Nominated	
Super Estrella de Oro (Colombia)	1996	"Estoy Aquí"	Most Popular Song	Nominated	
Super Estrella de Oro (Colombia)	1996	Shakira	Gran Super Estrella de Oro	Honoree	
Swiss Music Awards	2011	"Waka Waka (This Time for Africa)"	Best Hit International	Won	
Teen Choice Awards	2002	Shakira	Choice Music - Female Artist	Nominated	
Teen Choice Awards	2002	"Whenever, Wherever"	Choice Music - Single	Nominated	
Teen Choice Awards	2006	Shakira	Choice Music: Female Artist	Nominated	
Teen Choice Awards	2006	Shakira	Choice V-Cast Artist	Nominated	
Teen Choice Awards	2006	"Hips Don't Lie" (featuring Wyclef Jean)	Choice Music: Single	Nominated	
Teen Choice Awards	2006	"Hips Don't Lie" (featuring Wyclef Jean)	Choice Music: R&B/Hip-Hop Track	Nominated	
Teen Choice Awards	2006	"Hips Don't Lie" (featuring Wyclef Jean)	Choice Summer Song	Nominated	
Teen Choice Awards	2010	Shakira	Choice Music: Female Artist	Nominated	
Teen Choice Awards	2010	Shakira	Choice Others: Activist	Won	
Teen Choice Awards	2014	Shakira — The Voice	Choice TV: Female Reality Personality	Won	
Teen Choice Awards	2015	Shakira	Choice Twit	Nominated	
Teen Choice Awards	2016	"Try Everything"	Choice Music: Song from a Movie or TV Show	Nominated	
Teen Choice Awards	2017	Shakira	Choice Latin Artist	Nominated	
Teen Choice Awards	2017	"Chantaje" (featuring Maluma)	Choice Latin Song	Nominated	
Teen Choice Awards	2017	"Deja Vu" (with Prince Royce)	Choice Latin Song	Nominated	
Telehit Awards	2008	Shakira	Most Important Latin Artist in the World	Won	
Telehit Awards	2009	Shakira	Most Important Latin Artist in the World	Won	
Telehit Awards	2010	Shakira	Artist of the Year	Nominated	
Telehit Awards	2011	"Rabiosa"	Song of the Year	Won	
Telehit Awards	2017	Shakira	Artist of the Decade	Nominated	
Telehit Awards	2017	"Me Enamoré"	Most Requested Spanish-language Video on Social Media	Nominated	
Telemundo TECLA Awards	2017	Shakira	Telemundo Innovation Award	Honoree	
TMF Awards (Netherlands)	2002	Shakira	Best Newcomer	Won	
TVE Disco del Año Gala (Spain)	2009	She Wolf	Album of the Year	Nominated	
TVE Disco del Año Gala (Spain)	2010	Sale el Sol	Album of the Year — Pop	Nominated	
UNICEF (Germany)	2009	Shakira	Solidarity Award	Honoree	
United Nations	2006	Shakira	Humanitarian Award	Honoree	
United Nations	2010	Shakira	Medal	Honoree	
Urban Music Awards	2009	Shakira	Best International Latino Act	Nominated	
VEVO Hot This Year Awards (Note: Fan-voted award.)	2014	"Dare (La La Brazil) 2014"	Best Female Video	Nominated	
VEVO Hot This Year Awards	2014	"La La La (Spanish)"	Best Latin Video	Won	
VEVO Hot This Year Awards	2014	"Can't Remember to Forget You" (with Rihanna)	Best Certified Video	Nominated	
VEVO Hot This Year Awards	2014	"Can't Remember to Forget You" (with Rihanna)	Sexiest Video	Won	
VEVO Hot This Year Awards	2014	"Can't Remember to Forget You" (with Rihanna)	Best Collaboration Video	Nominated	
Victoria's Secret What Is Sexy? Awards	2013	Shakira	Sexiest curves	Won	
Viña del Mar International Song Festival	1993	Shakira	Best Vocalist/Popular Artist	Won	
Virgin Media Music Awards	2010	Shakira	Best Solo Female	Won	
VIVA Comet Awards	2002	Shakira	Newcomer International	Won	
WME Awards	2022	"Te Felicito" (with Rauw Alejandro)	Latin American Song	Nominated	
WME Awards	2023	"TQG" (with Karol G)	Latin American Song	Nominated	
WME Awards	2025	"Soltera"	Latin American Song	Pending	
World Economic Forum	2008	Shakira	Young Global Leaders	Honoree	
World Economic Forum	2017	Shakira	Davos Forums: Crystal Award	Honoree	
World Literacy Foundation	2020	Shakira	Global Literacy Award	Honoree	
World Music Awards	1998	Shakira	World's Best Selling Latin Female Artist	Won	
World Music Awards	2003	Shakira	World's Best Selling Latin Female Artist	Won	
World Music Awards	2005	Shakira	World's Best Selling Latin Female Artist	Won	
World Music Awards	2006	Shakira	World's Best Selling Latin Female Artist	Won	
World Music Awards	2007	Shakira	World's Best Selling Pop Artist	Nominated	
World Music Awards	2010	Shakira	World's Best Selling Latin American Artist	Won	
World Music Awards	2014	Shakira	World's Best Female Artist	Won	
World Music Awards	2014	Shakira	World's Best selling Latin Artist	Nominated	
World Music Awards	2014	Shakira	World's Best Live Act	Nominated	
World Music Awards	2014	Shakira	World's Best Entertainer of the Year	Nominated	
World Music Awards	2014	"Can't Remember to Forget You" (with Rihanna)	World's Best Song	Nominated	
World Music Awards	2014	"Can't Remember to Forget You" (with Rihanna)	World's Best Video	Nominated	
World Music Awards	2014	"Empire"	World's Best Song	Nominated	
World Music Awards	2014	"Empire"	World's Best Video	Nominated	
World Music Awards	2014	Shakira	World's Best Album	Nominated	
World Music Awards	2014	Live from Paris	World's Best Album	Nominated	
World Soundtrack Awards	2008	"Despedida"	Best Original Song Written Directly for a Film	Nominated	
XM Nation Music Awards	2005	Shakira & Usher	Dream Collaboration	Won	
Your World Awards (Premios Tú Mundo)	2014	Shakira	Favorite Pop Artist	Nominated	
Your World Awards (Premios Tú Mundo)	2017	Shakira	Favorite Pop Artist	Nominated	
Your World Awards (Premios Tú Mundo)	2017	"Me Enamoré"	Party-Starter Song	Nominated	
Žebřík Music Awards	2009	"She Wolf"	Best Video	Nominated	

== Other honors ==
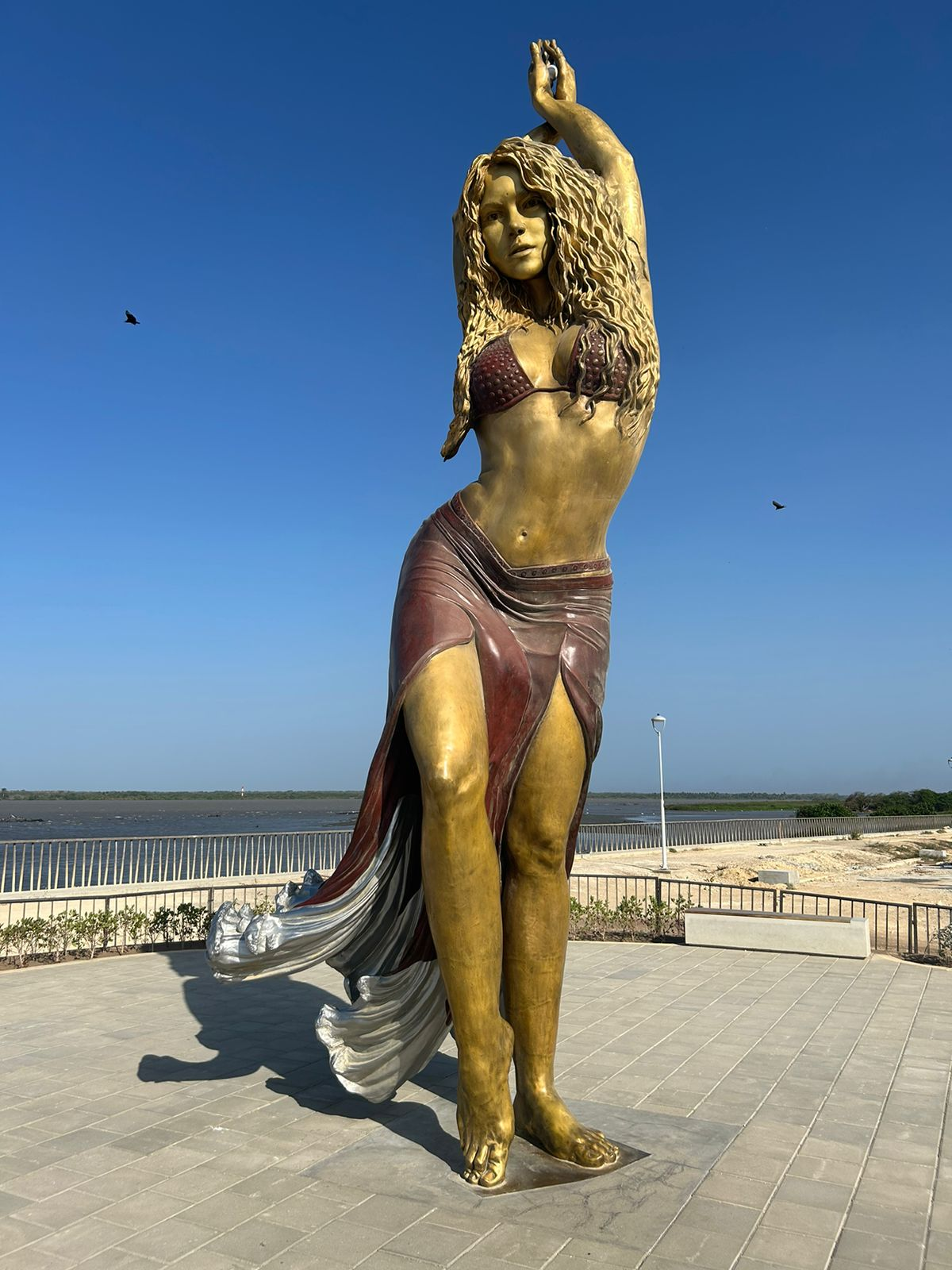
A 21-foot bronze statue of Shakira in Barranquilla (2023)

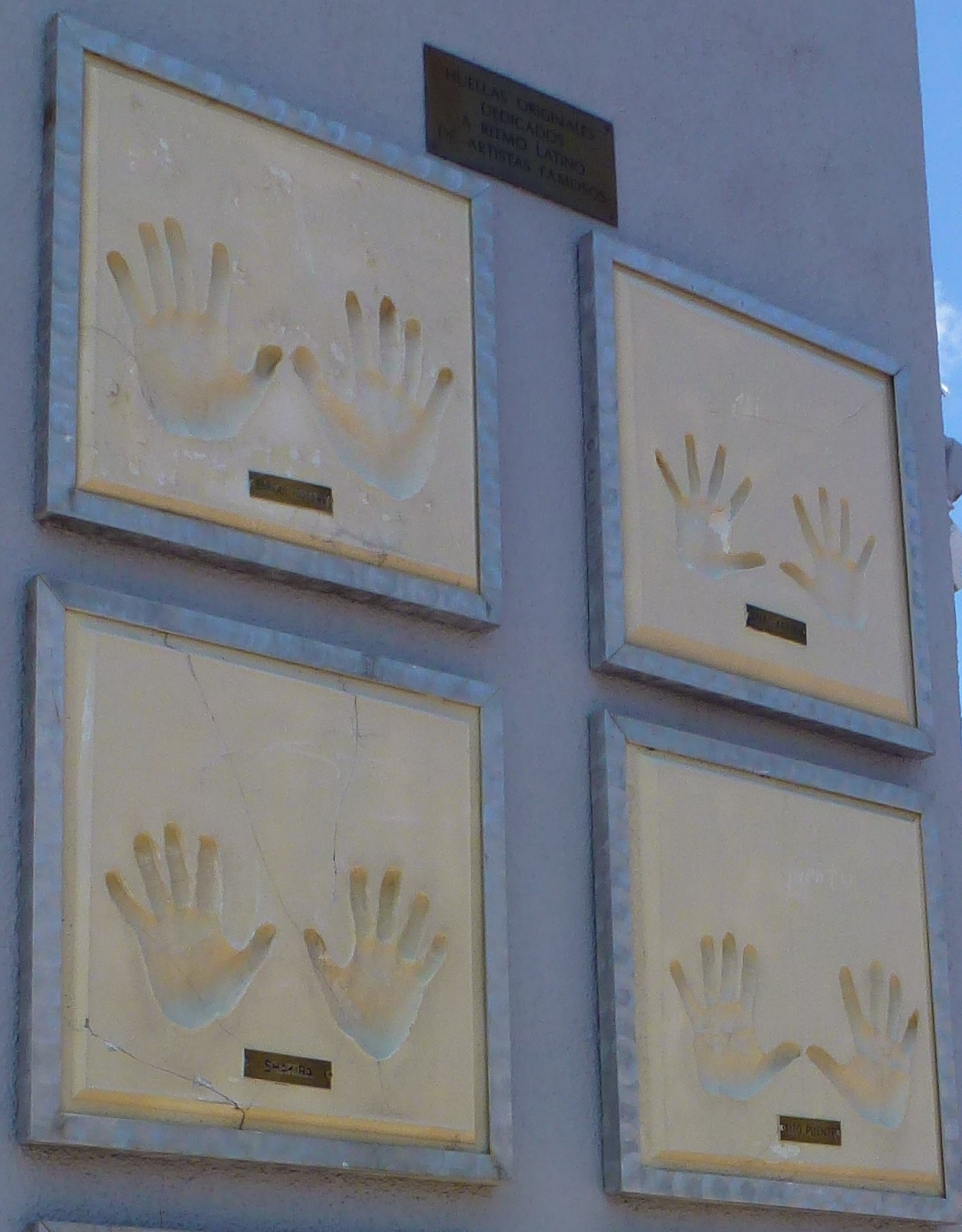
Shakira's handprints at Ritmo Latino's San Fernando Mall

List of state honors
Country	City/Gov./Entity	Year	Description	Status	Ref.
Dominican Republic	City of Santo Domingo	—N/a	Key to City of Santo Domingo	Honoree	
Colombia	President of Colombia, Ernesto Samper	1998	National Merit Citation/Goodwill ambassador	Honoree	
Colombia	Bogotá City Council	c. 1997-1999	Gran Cruz de Oro	Honoree	
Colombia	Congress of Colombia	1999	Grand Order of Democracy Policarpa Salavarrieta / Grand Commander	Honoree	
Austria	City of Vienna/Mayor of Vienna	2003	Goldener Rathausmann	Honoree	
Lebanon	District of Tannourine/Mayor Bahaa Harb	2006	Key to City of Tannourine	Honoree	
United States	City of Miami/Mayor Manny Diaz	2006	Key to City of Miami	Honoree	
Argentina	Buenos Aires City Legislature	2008	Guest of Honor	Honoree	
Bolivia	City of Santa Cruz/Mayor Percy Fernández	2011	Keys to City of Santa Cruz	Honoree	
France	Ministry of Culture/Minister Frédéric Mitterrand	2012	Ordre des Arts et des Lettres	Honoree	

Other honors
Country	Year	Honor	Status	Ref.
Spain	2012	Princess of Asturias Awards: Premio Cooperación Internacional	Nominated	
Spain	2012	Princess of Asturias Awards: Premio de la Concordia	Nominated	
India	2013	Order of Princess Isabella by Bourbons of India	Honoree	

== See also ==
- List of Shakira records and achievements
