= Elixir (perfume) =

Women's fragrance by Colombian singer Shakira

Fragrance by Shakira
- Released: July 2013
- Label: Shakira Perfumes
- Tagline: The new fragrance
- Predecessor: S by Shakira Eau Florale
- Successor: Wild Elixir
- Website: Official website

Elixir is a women's fragrance by Colombian singer songwriter Shakira, developed in a collaboration with international fashion company Puig. After the release of her first two fragrances, Puig enlisted several perfumers to work on Shakira's third fragrance, which she claimed would capture her "most sensual and exotic side." The final product was Elixir, an amber perfume based on various spicy and woody sources. The flacon of the perfume is inspired by apothecary bottles and is made to resemble a magical potion, featuring a light golden colour scheme.

Shakira launched the fragrance at a press release in São Paulo, Brazil, in July 2012. Additionally, Jaume de Laiguana directed a commercial for the fragrance, which was filmed in the Sahara desert in Morocco. In August 2013, Wild Elixir was released as a flanker fragrance to Elixir. The floral amber perfume is similar to the original one in appearance but features a variation in the colour scheme. It was promoted through a commercial which features Shakira encountering two cheetahs in an arid landscape.

== Development ==
=== Background ===
In 2008, international fashion and fragrance company Puig announced that it had formed a partnership with Shakira and had signed an agreement "to develop a line of signature products produced with and inspired by the artist". The first product to appear was S by Shakira, which was released in September 2010, followed by S by Shakira Eau Florale.

After developing her first two fragrances, Puig began working on Shakira's third perfume and enlisted Alexandra Kosinski and Sonia Constant, perfumers from Swiss fragrance manufacturer Givaudan, to collaborate with Elisabeth Vidal, a perfumer from Puig. Vidal had previously worked with Shakira on S by Shakira Eau Florale. The perfumers came up with the concept of a "second skin", described by Shakira as a "fragrance that becomes a part of you". In an interview with Women's Wear Daily, the singer claimed that the scent would display her "most sensual and exotic side" and had seemingly been inspired by the deserts of Morocco.

=== Scent and packaging ===
Elixir belongs to the amber olfactive family, which is known to contain intense and long lasting fragrances. The top notes of the perfume were described by Shakira as "floral and spicy" and include neroli, white pepper, and white flower; the heart notes were said to be "velvety and fruity" and are based on the scents of flowers like freesia and paeonia, and apricot; the base notes contain amber, benzoin, musk, sugar cane and white cedar wood. The ingredients of the perfume are mostly based on spicy and woody elements which overbear the sweeter floral elements. Shakira herself stated that the "sweetness" in Elixir was kept to a limited amount.

German packaging company Gerresheimer was hired to produce the flacon of Elixir. It is made of clear moulded glass and has a slender gold-tinted neck. According to Jose Manuel Albesa, chief brand officer of Puig, it is inspired by the bottles used in the historic medical practice of apothecary. In an interview with Latina, Shakira revealed that she wanted to "depict the kind of bottle that was used in ancient times, but that looked modern and chic as well" and come up with a design similar to a magical potion, which is the definition of the word 'elixir'. As the scent is inspired by the desert, she chose the tint of the bottle to be golden so that it can "evoke the memories of sands and sunsets". The packaging of the fragrance was designed by Colombian artist Catalina Estrada and features colourful illustrations of various birds and leaves printed on a pale background.

== Release ==
Released in late-July 2012, Elixir was made available for purchase exclusively in American department store chains Kohl's and Sears. The two stores served as exclusive retailers of the fragrance for two months, after which it was released to mass market stores like CVS Caremark and Walgreens. Elixir was released in approximately 19,000 stores in the United States alone. Elsewhere, Elixir was released in Eastern Europe, Italy, and Latin America. The perfume was aimed at a younger demographic, according to Albesa. Elixir was made available as an eau de toilette, and its prices ranged from US $17.50 to US $36 with respect to the size.

Shakira launched Elixir at a press release in São Paulo, Brazil, on 17 July 2012, where she discussed her inspiration behind the fragrance and its development process. The commercial for the fragrance was shot in the Sahara desert in Morocco by Jaume de Laiguana, who had previously directed music videos for various songs by Shakira, like "Loca" and "Rabiosa". The advertisement features Shakira in the middle of the desert wearing a long skirt; she opens a bottle of Elixir and performs a dance routine, attracting an eagle towards her which perches on her arm. A competition was held on the official website of the perfume to determine a winner who would be rewarded the long skirt Shakira wore in the commercial.

=== Products ===
Elixir was produced in the following range:

- Eau de toilette spray - 15 ml/0.5 oz
- Eau de toilette spray - 30 ml/1 oz
- Eau de toilette spray - 50 ml/1.7 oz
- Deodorant spray - 150 ml/5.1 oz
- Body lotion - 101 ml/3.4 oz (available only in gift sets)
- Lip balm - 15.7 ml/0.53 oz (available only in gift sets)

== Reception ==
Samantha Lea from Latina praised the perfume's versatility, saying it is suitable for use "whether you prefer fruity to floral scents or want your scent to transport you to a tropical beach". She chose the usage of freesia and peony as the highlight of Elixir and included the perfume in her list of "Five Amazing Summer Scents and Perfumes". Miranda Noland, an editor of the magazine, opined the Elixir gift set would "please any Shakira lover." At the 2011 Academia Del Perfume Award ceremony sponsored by the Fragrance Foundation, Elixir won the award for "Best Female Perfume General Public Category".

Industry analysts predicted that the perfume would make $14 million through global retail sales in its first year. Twenty percent of this amount was credited to sales in the United States. In April 2013, Puig released a press statement mentioning that Elixir had performed well commercially.

== Wild Elixir ==
Wild Elixir

Fragrance by Shakira
- Released: August 2013
- Label: Puig
- Tagline: Discover the new fragrance
- Predecessor: S by Shakira Aquamarine
- Website: Official website

=== Background and scent ===
Wild Elixir was released as a flanker fragrance to Elixir on 25 August 2013. Categorised as a floral oriental perfume, Wild Elixir features top notes of cassis and mandarin; heart notes of honeysuckle flower, orange blossom, and peach fruit accord; the base notes consist of benzoin resin, patchouli, and sandalwood. The flacon of the perfume is similar to the original one, but instead features a contrasting colour scheme of golden and black. The packaging was again designed by Estrada and features illustrations of flowers and wild cats set on a brownish orange background and is similar to the look of the African savannah.

The Russian edition of Cosmopolitan gave Wild Elixir a positive review, praising its packaging and the choice of ingredients in the notes.

=== Promotion ===
On 23 June 2013, Shakira released a teaser of the commercial for the fragrance along with a photo of her posing with two cheetahs. A full version of the commercial was released later. It begins with Shakira, dressed in a dark burgundy gown, coming across a pair of cheetahs in an arid desert region. The two animals, alarmed, commence running towards her in an effort to attack her. Shakira responds by raising her hand, which prompts the cheetahs to abruptly stop in their tracks. They are later seen prowling around her while she is standing atop a rock and a bottle of Wild Elixir is then shown placed on a log of wood. The official website of the perfume also features a game made to promote the fragrance and Shakira's Barefoot Foundation.

== See also ==
- List of celebrity-branded fragrances
- Perfumery
