= Sonia Constant =

French perfumer and entrepreneur

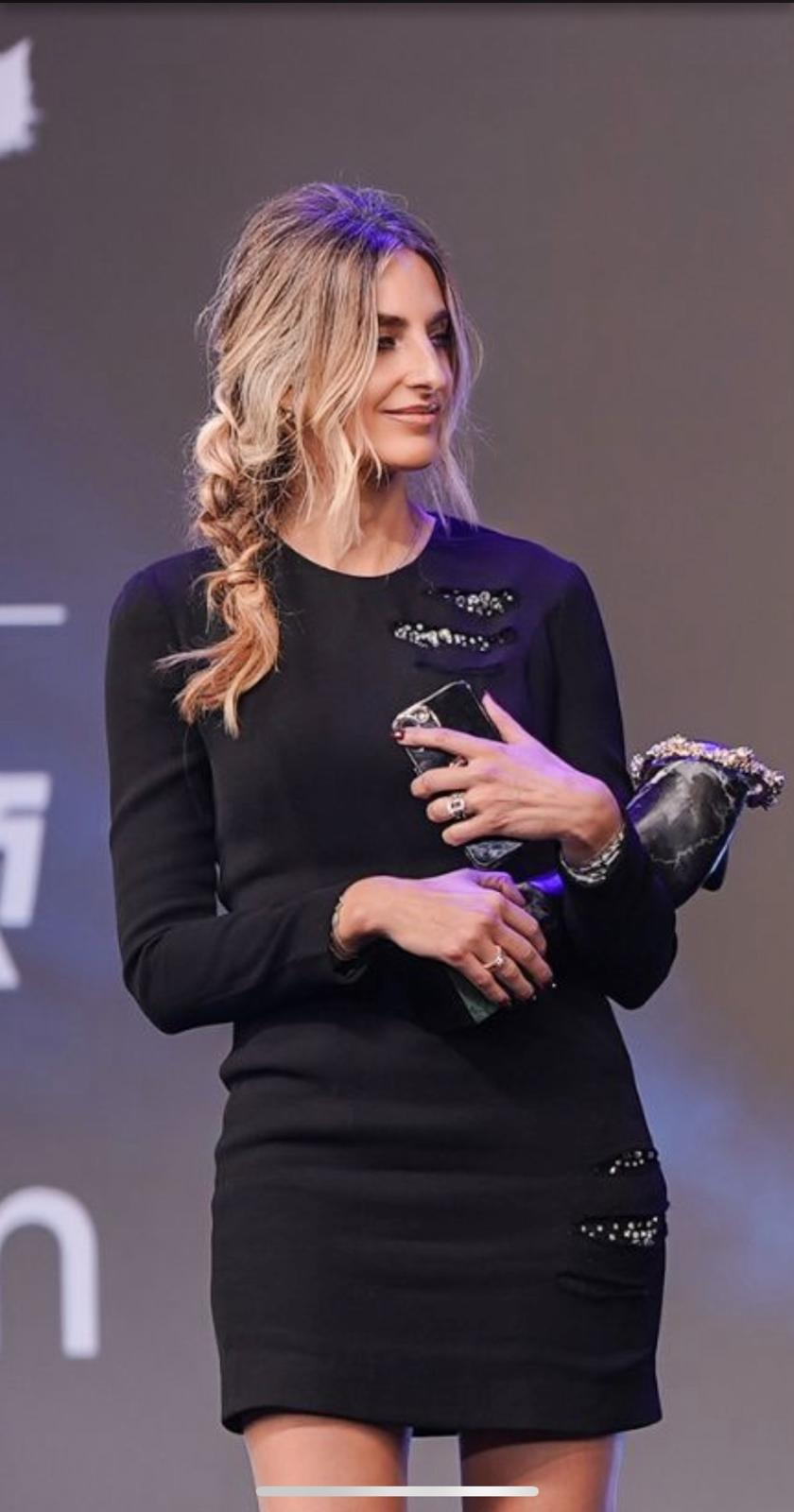
- Born: 23 July 1978 (age 48); Paris, France
- Occupations: Master Perfumer, entrepreneur
- Employer: Givaudan
- Organization: Ella K
- Known for: Perfume creation

Sonia Constant is a French perfumer and entrepreneur. She is a senior perfumer at Givaudan and the co-founder of the fragrance brand Ella K, launched in 2017. She has created or co-created fragrances for brands including Tom Ford, Narciso Rodriguez, Jean Paul Gaultier, Mugler, Lancôme and Jimmy Choo.

== Biography ==
Sonia Constant developed an interest in perfumery at an early age. She later studied perfumery at Givaudan Perfumery School after completing a master's degree at ISIPCA. Following an internship, Constant joined the Swiss fragrance company Givaudan. Early in her career there, she was mentored by perfumer Christine Nagel. She has worked at Givaudan as a perfumer since 2004, creating fragrances for markets including Europe, Brazil, the United States and the Middle East. In 2017, she founded the perfume brand, Ella K.

== Career ==
Constant has created or co-created fragrances for brands including Tom Ford, Narciso Rodriguez, Jimmy Choo, Marc Jacobs, Mugler, Jean Paul Gaultier, Lancôme and Paco Rabanne. Her credited works include Ombre Leather and Noir Extrême for Tom Ford, For Her Pure Musc and Musc Noir Rose for Narciso Rodriguez, Angel Nova for Mugler, La Belle and Le Beau for Jean Paul Gaultier, Idôle for Lancôme, and 1 Million Parfum for Paco Rabanne.

The olfactory encyclopedia Fragrantica lists 208 fragrances to her credit. Her work has been associated with the use of musks and with contrasts between intensity and transparency. Ombre Leather and Noir Extrême for Tom Ford, Musc K for Ella K, Angel Nova for Thierry Mugler, Pure Musc for Narciso Rodriguez have been cited as some of her representative creations.

Her style is particularly characterized by the use of musks and contrasts between intensity and transparency. Constant has described travel as an important source of inspiration for her work. During her travels, she has used scent-capture technology to record the olfactory impressions of places, plants and flowers. On her travels, she carries a unique technology that captures the olfactory imprint of a place or a flower.

=== Selected creations ===
- Ombre Leather, Tom Ford
- Noir Extrême, Tom Ford
- Musc K, Ella K
- For Her Pure Musc, Narciso Rodriguez
- For Her Intense, Narciso Rodriguez
- For Her Pure Musc Blanc, Narciso Rodriguez
- For Her Musc Noir Rose, Narciso Rodriguez
- Inter Parfums, Moonlight Patchouli Le Parfum
- Inter Parfums, Rose d’Isparta
- Viola Essenziale, Salvatore Ferragamo

==== Fragrances created in collaboration ====
- I Want Choo, Jimmy Choo
- Daisy Wild, Marc Jacobs
- Angel Nova, Thierry Mugler
- La Belle, Jean Paul Gaultier
- Le Beau, Jean Paul Gaultier
- Idole, Lancôme
- 1 Million Parfum, Paco Rabanne
- Donna, Valentino
- Eau Fresh, Eternity

==== She also has done work for the following brands: ====
- Carolina Herrera
- Armani - Ocean di Gioia (2020)
- Ralph Lauren
- Nina Ricci - Bella (2018)
- Balmain
- Montblanc
- Burberry - Brit for Men Summer (2012)
- Van Cleef & Arpels - Moonlight Patchouli (2016)
- Guerlain
- Kenzo - L’Eau 2 Kenzo pour Homme (2012)
- Calvin Klein - Eternity Eau Fresh (2020)
- Boss
- Boucheron - Rose d’Isparta (2020)
- Lanvin
- Cartier
- Rochas
- Ferragamo
- Viktor&Rolf - Magic Dancing Roses (2017)

=== Ella K ===
In 2017, Constant co-founded the niche fragrance brand Ella K with Olivier Gagliardi. The brand is built around a fictional character inspired by the Swiss explorer Ella Maillart, with its fragrances presented as travel-inspired olfactory narratives.

She has been described as the first female master perfumer to found her own fragrance house. In 2025, Ella K, which operates in partnership with Givaudan, reported growth of more than 70% and continued its international expansion.

== Recognition ==
Constant has received awards for several of her fragrance creations. In a profile published by the fashion supplement of the Italian newspaper La Repubblica, she was described as "one of the most talented perfumers of her generation".

=== Awards ===
- Cuir Vetiver, Yves Rocher, best men's fragrance, Sonia Constant, Givaudan, FIFI Awards 2017.
- Le Beau, Jean Paul Gaultier, best men's fragrance launch, Sonia Constant and Quentin Bisch, Givaudan, FIFI Awards 2020.
- Angel Nova, Eau de Parfum, People's Choice Award, women's launch, The French Fragrance Foundation Awards 2021.
- Noir Extrême, Tom Ford, Fragrance of the Year, Sonia Constant, Givaudan, 2023.
- "Perfurmer of the Year", Golden Osmanthus Awards, Shanghai, 2024.
- Poème de Sagano, Ella K, Top Overseas Fragance, Golden Osmanthus Awards, Shanghai, 2024.
- Camélia K, Ella K, Extra Ordinary Perfume, The Fragrance Foundation UK, 2024.
- Pluie sur Halong, Ella K, Top Classic Fragrance, Golden Osmanthus Awards, Shanghai, 2025.
- Lettre de Pushkar, Ella K, Best Female Fragrance, Golden Osmanthus Awards, Shanghai, 2025.
- "Perfurmer of the Year", Golden Osmanthus Awards, Shanghai, 2025.
- For Her Intense, Narcisco Rodriguez, Prestige Femme, Dufstars 2026.
