= S by Shakira =

Perfume by Shakira

S By Shakira

Fragrance by Shakira
- Released: September 4, 2010
- Label: Shakira Perfumes
- Tagline: The new fragrance
- Successor: S by Shakira Eau Florale
- Website: Official website

S by Shakira is the first woman's fragrance by Colombian singer songwriter Shakira. Developing an interest in perfumery and scents, Shakira signed an agreement with international fashion company Puig to create a line of beauty and personal care products. S by Shakira is an amber perfume which combines scents of various exotic sources like sambac jasmine, sandalwood, and vanilla. The bottle of the perfume is made of treated glass which reflects light at different angles; it does not have a cap and instead utilises a key-like mechanism to stop the flow of the perfume. Shakira launched S by Shakira at a press release in Madrid, Spain, in June 2010, and it was sent to retail stores in September 2010. Critics praised the scent of S by Shakira, but there was criticism regarding the design of the bottle. It was nominated for a FiFi Award in 2011.

In September 2011, Shakira released her second fragrance S by Shakira Eau Florale, which is a "floral interpretation" of the original fragrance. The perfume is more influenced by the scent of flowers and Shakira enlisted the aid of perfumer Elisabeth Vidal to create the fragrance. Shakira promoted S by Shakira and S by Shakira Eau Florale at a press release in Paris, France, in March 2013. S by Shakira Aquamarine was released in early 2013 as a limited edition fragrance and is inspired by the smell of the ocean, making use of various ozonic substances in its scent.

== Development ==
=== Background ===
Creating S by Shakira has been a long process of personal exploration, and the result is the exact expression of myself, through a fragrance. S [by Shakira] is the perfume I've always dreamed of. It’s the combination of my favourite essences, and developing it has been a magical experience.

—Shakira, talking about the development of the fragrance.

In 2008, international fashion and fragrance company Puig announced that it had formed a partnership with Shakira and had signed an agreement "to develop a line of signature products produced with and inspired by the artist". The agreement included the production and creation of several beauty and personal care products and it was stated that "Shakira will develop, with a dedicated team, the creation of the product line from inception to completion". The distribution of the products and the creation of "strategic alliances" were chosen to be solely the responsibility of the company. Shakira expressed her views about the partnership, saying "I am very excited to be able to express myself through another creative medium. “My feeling is that personal care and beauty should be effortless and accessible for everyone." Interested in perfumery and conveying "emotions through aromas", the singer decided to take the idea further and began exploring various scents. The development of the perfume took three years to complete and Shakira compared the process to composing a song, opining that "It's similar to the process you go through when writing a melody: certain chord combinations inspire different feelings in the listener. I wanted to find a way of expressing the feeling of pure happiness through the medium of fragrance". José Manuel Albesa, chief brand officer of Puig, commented that Shakira was completely involved in the process of developing the fragrance and was "extremely hands-on". Didier Maine de Biran, general manager of Puig USA, opined that S by Shakira was different from other celebrity-branded fragrances, saying "What makes this stand out is how involved she [Shakira] was. The key difference is she has the knowledge of what she wants and really wants to share it with her fans. She's involved. She's committed. And it is just a great fragrance that stands on its own".

=== Scent and packaging ===
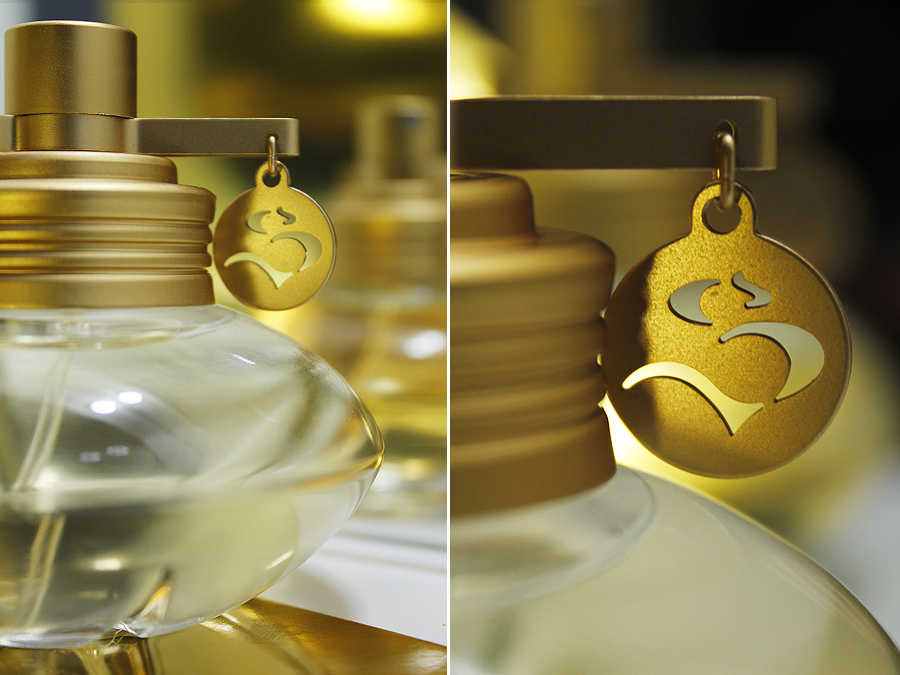
According to Shakira, the pendant with the "S" symbol (right), which is attached to the top of the bottle, is reflective of a "charm for happiness"

The fragrance of S by Shakira is categorized as a "transparent oriental", and according to Shakira's official website, it is inspired by "what is unique and exceptional about her, her light". The perfume is made of a variety of oils and substances derived from Middle Eastern and Indian regions. The top notes include citrus, peach, and passion fruit chord; the heart notes give a "spicy freshness" through the use of various flowers like gardenia and sambac jasmine, and cinnamon; the base notes consist of amber, musk, sandalwood and vanilla chord. The fragrance is meant to be used by women, and Shakira claimed that "The type of women who feel a connection with this fragrance would be independent and strong, but also a woman with a great capacity to love and a strong sense of who they are. It’s for a woman who believes in herself."

The packaging of S by Shakira is designed to reflect light and features gold accents, which Puig felt would help it stand out. The bottle of the perfume is "soft and feminine" in design and is made of glass, which is surface finished and has six star-shaped cuts carved in its bottom so that it is able to reflect light from different angles. India Today website WonderWoman.in likened the bottle to the shape of an "oriental dancer". The bottle does not have any cap and instead utilises a key-like structure to stop the flow of the perfume. The absence of the cap aims to represent "Shakira's bare feet". She explained her idea behind the design of the bottle: "I wanted the bottle to be something that could contain a dream. Solid like the bottles of yesteryear, but with a light feeling. And it comes with something special. The pendant containing the "S" symbolizes a charm for happiness that I wanted to share."

== Release ==
Shakira launched S by Shakira in Madrid, Spain, by organising a press release on June 22, 2010. At the press release, Shakira talked about her inspiration and the development of the perfume, saying "Like a song, a perfume is composed of different individual notes, which together form a harmony." The perfume went on sale on September 10 and was available for purchase in more than 15,000 stores. Samples were distributed to those who purchased tickets to Shakira's The Sun Comes Out World Tour, which was going to appear in New York during the fall season. S by Shakira was made available in the following range:

- Eau de toilette - 50 ml/1.69 oz
- Eau de toilette - 80 ml/2.71 oz
- Deodorant - 150 ml/5.07 oz
- Body lotion - 74 ml/2.5 oz

=== Promotion ===
A television commercial to promote the perfume was released in late-August 2010 and featured a remixed version of her 2010 single "Gypsy". Vanita Sabnani, vice president of marketing for Puig USA, revealed that the company had decided on a "true 360-degree ad and marketing campaign" and had made preparations to promote S by Shakira through Jumbotron displays, taxi advertisements, and social networking services. Print advertisements were also commissioned and the first placement was printed in the September issue of fashion magazine Vogue.

== Reception ==
Style.com favoured Shakira's decision to release a perfume and called it "sexy, sensual, and a whole host of other words beginning with "S"". Melanie Dee from Yahoo! Voices criticised the bottle of the perfume as "probably one of the ugliest perfume bottles", but highly praised the scent, describing it to be "simply delicious"; she concluded that "I am never all too fond of celebrity fragrances, and JLo has been the only celeb, in my opinion that manages to impress time after time. S by Shakira though has managed to make another fan". Kim West from Beauty World News felt the perfume was truly reflective of Shakira's nature, saying "Full of energy, sensuality, and good vibrations, S by Shakira bottles the singer's essence and what makes her unique". In 2013, Latina magazine included S by Shakira on their list of "The 11 Best Latino Celebrity Perfumes" and found the perfume "perfect" for romantic occasions, calling it "energetic, confident, and so sexy thanks to the vanilla and sandalwood notes". At the 2010 Academia Del Perfume Award ceremony sponsored by The Fragrance Foundation, S by Shakira won the award for "Best Women's Fragrance Great Distribution". The award was received by Pilar Trabal, vice president of Puig Iberia, and Shakira thanked the jury and voters through a telephone call. At the 2011 FiFi Awards ceremony sponsored by The Fragrance Foundation, S by Shakira received a nomination in the category of "Women's Broad Appeal" but lost to American actress Halle Berry's fragrance Pure Orchid. Commercially, industry analysts predicted that S by Shakira would make $35 to $45 million through global retail sales in its first year.

== Flanker fragrances ==
=== S by Shakira Eau Florale ===
S by Shakira Eau Florale

Fragrance by Shakira
- Released: September 2011
- Label: Puig
- Tagline: The new fragrance
- Predecessor: S by Shakira
- Successor: Elixir
- Website: Official website

==== Background and scent ====
After working on her first fragrance S by Shakira, Shakira further developed an interest in perfumery and wanted to explore more scents, saying "After working on my debut scent, S by Shakira, I became interested in the possibilities of expressing emotions through scents." Working closely with perfumer Elisabeth Vidal, she decided to make a "more gentle and romantic" and simpler version of the original fragrance and explored floral scents. S by Shakira Eau Florale is categorized as a "floral musky scent", and according to Shakira's official website, it is a "floral interpretation of the first fragrance by Shakira". The top notes include bergamot and cassis; the heart notes consist of jasmine, heliotropium, and wild red fruits; the base notes consist of musk and vanilla extracts. The packing of the perfume is very similar to the original one, but features a pink and white colour scheme and the "S" logo is surrounded by a bunch of flowers. Similarly, the bottle retains the original shape but has a "more romantic and feminine feel" and a pink colour scheme; the colour of the perfume is golden rose.

==== Promotion ====
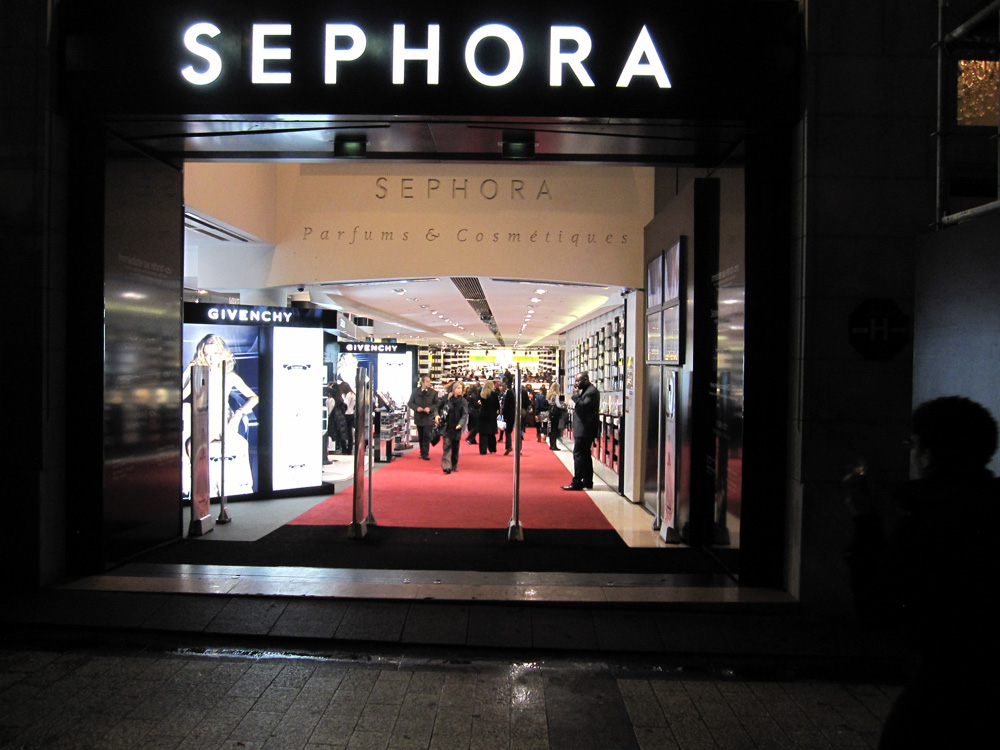
S by Shakira and S by Shakira Eau Florale were promoted at the Sephora store on the Champs-Élysées street in Paris, France.

Two months after giving birth to her son Milan Piqué Mebarak, Shakira organised a press release to take place on March 27, 2013, at the Sephora store on the Champs-Élysées street in Paris, France. At the event, Shakira signed autographs, posed for pictures with fans, and promoted both S by Shakira and S by Shakira Eau Florale. Prior to the press release, Shakira attended an "intimate" meeting with three fashion bloggers and discussed her experience in developing the perfumes. The commercial for S by Shakira was extended to include a section which exclusively promoted S by Shakira Eau Florale; this version was nominated for "Digital Communication Award For Best Female" at the 2012 Academia Del Perfume awards ceremony.

Similar to the original perfume, S by Shakira Eau Florale was made available in the following range:.

- Eau de toilette - 50 ml/1.69 oz
- Eau de toilette - 80 ml/2.71 oz
- Deodorant - 150 ml/5.07 oz
- Body lotion - 74 ml/2.5 oz

=== S by Shakira Aquamarine ===
S by Shakira Aquamarine

Fragrance by Shakira
- Released: 2013
- Label: Puig
- Predecessor: Elixir
- Successor: Wild Elixir
- Website: Official website

S by Shakira Aquamarine was launched as a limited edition fragrance in early 2013. Inspired by the ocean, Shakira aimed to "express something pure, elemental and sensual" through a fragrance and opined that "the ocean represents all of those things. In a word, it is a source of true inspiration". The perfume bottle and the packaging follow a largely similar design to the original one but feature a "metallic combination" of gold and turquoise. The top notes include bergamot, mandarin orange, passion fruit chord and various ozonic substances; the heart notes capture the scents of different flowers like jasmine, plumeria, and tiaré; the base notes also consist of ozonic substances, as well as cedar wood. S by Shakira Aquamarine was made available in the following range:

- Eau de toilette - 50 ml/1.69 oz
- Eau de toilette - 80 ml/2.71 oz

=== S Kiss ===
In 2017, Shakira introduced S Kiss, a limited-edition fragrance that is sensual, enchanting, and youthful, capturing the sweetness and memorability of a first kiss. The scent features top notes of lemon, blackcurrant, raspberry, and peach, while the heart reveals pink peony, water lily, and honeysuckle, culminating in a base of sandalwood and musk that leave a lasting impression. The "S" bottle reflects Shakira's flirtatious and romantic side, adorned with pink and red hues and a playful red pompom, embodying femininity and fun. The fragrance’s fruity and floral combination, along with the creamy sandalwood and soft musk, evokes the tender softness and allure of a gentle, unforgettable kiss.

== See also ==
- List of celebrity-branded fragrances
- Perfumery
