= Shakira as a cultural icon =

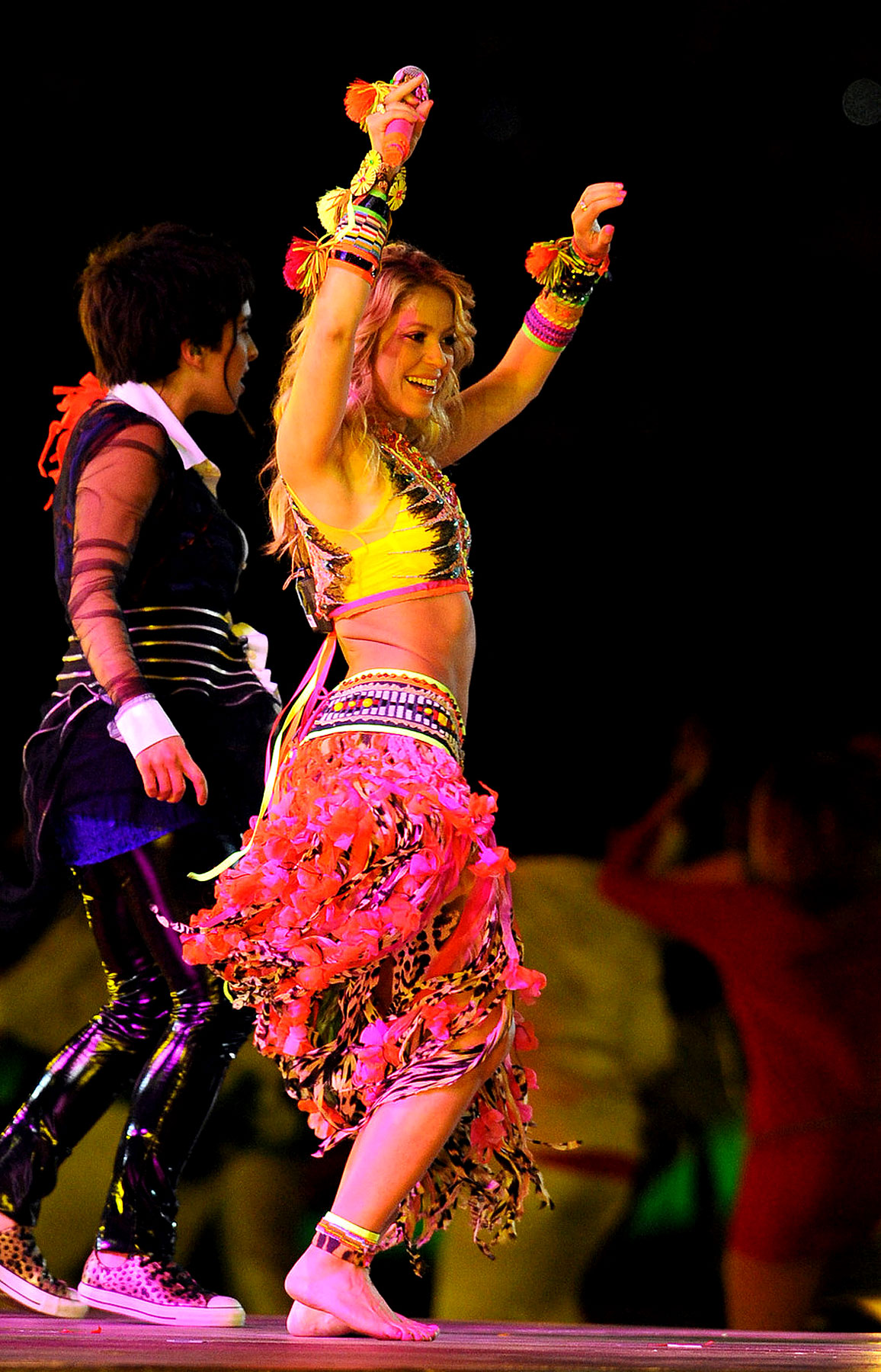
Shakira performing her song "Waka Waka (This Time for Africa)" during the closing ceremony of the 2010 World Cup

Singer Shakira was born in Barranquilla, Colombia and debuted in the music industry in 1991. She is considered by various media outlets as a "Latin and Arab cultural icon" in popular culture due to her ability to bring rhythms and imagery to mainstream culture in countries outside of these, increasing their consumption and popularity. Her humanitarian work and cultural impact have given her the status of a "heroine" in her native country. Journalist Dagoberto Páramo wrote for "El Espectador" about Shakira as a "symbol of national identity," writing that "Shakira has successfully managed to "...put Colombia at the top of the artistic world."

Culturs magazine notes that Shakira has a big and diverse fanbase in Latin America, United States, and places as odd as Saudi Arabia. Journalist Brook Farely with a background in ethnic studies wrote "She (Shakira) exposes her U.S. listeners to music that is influenced by different cultures other than their own... Shakira's music transcends cultural norms, and takes on a life and personality of its own." Other media outlets also classify her as a "Middle Eastern cultural icon" due to the high impact of this Arab culture on the mainstream.

== Background ==
Much of her multiculturalism was noted by the media since her second album where she included her Lebanese culture in songs like "Ojos Así" and Mexican culture in the song "Ciega, Sordomuda", later on the album "Laundry Service" Shakira would jump to worldwide fame with "Whenever Wherever", NPR highlights her breakthrough in the US market with "Whenever, Wherever", arguing that Shakira positioned herself in a transnational search, incorporating instruments such as the zampoña and the charango, pointing out a new type of success in the popularity charts. The newspaper Los Angeles Times points out that Shakira demonstrates what genuinely multicultural stardom looks like, proudly displaying her roots through lyrics in Spanish and choreographies based on the belly dance she learned in her childhood. Vinyl Me, Please notes that Shakira has shaken up the music industry with her authenticity, fusing influences from her Colombian and Lebanese heritage in her music and live performances. After her performance in Super Bowl 2020 Colombian media highlighted that her Super Bowl performance displayed remarkable versatility, incorporating Latin rock, pop, Arabic belly dancing, mapalé, salsa, and champeta, reflecting the cultural diversity of Colombia's Caribbean region by incorporating masks typical of Colombian culture.

== Analysis and academic studies ==
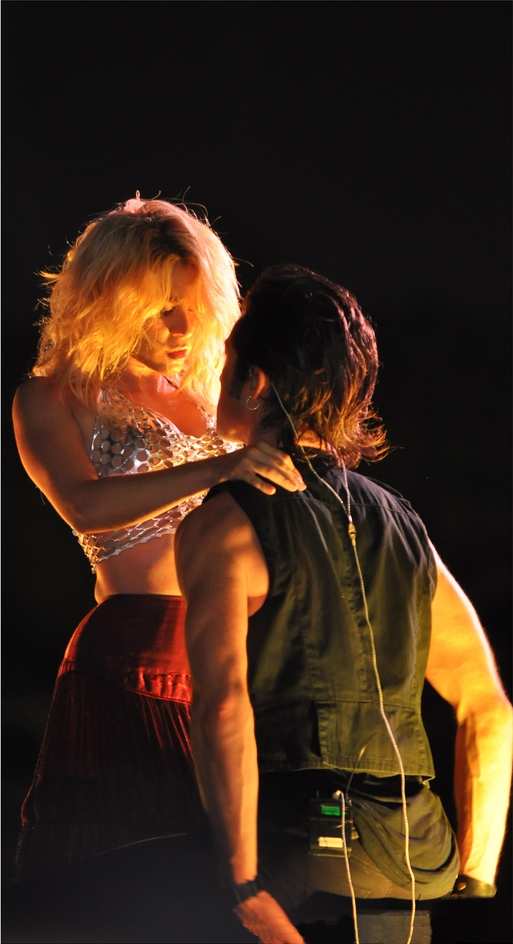
Shakira during her flamenco segment on "Sale el Sol World Tour", she is acclaimed for incorporating many cultures into her performances.

=== Latinidad ===
Shakira has been the subject of various academic studies analyzing how her music and public image contribute to notions of Colombianidad and Latinidad. In the article "Shakira as the Idealized, Transnational Citizen: A Case Study of Colombianidad in Transition" Maria Elena Cepeda examines how Shakira, as an internationally recognized singer-songwriter, occupies positions that influence both internal and external perceptions of what it means to be Latina and Colombian. Furthermore, the study "Tracking Transnational Shakira on Her Way to Conquer the World" by Gónica Gontovnik highlights how Shakira has become a transnational musical product, representing the ideology of a unified world and reflecting aspects of Colombian and Latin culture in her music. Maria Elena Cepeda's article "When Latina Hips Make/Mark History: Music Video in the 'New' American Studies" examines how Shakira, of Lebanese descent and born in the Caribbean region of Colombia, describes herself as a combination of cultures, reflecting her multicultural identity and its impact on the representation of Latinidad in the media. In his study "Shakira, Ricky Martin and Philanthropic Translatinidad," Paul Allatson analyzes how Shakira, as well as global musical figures, contribute to the popularization of Latin music beyond the Latin American market, exploring the notion of 'translatinidad' and its impact on popular culture. In his analysis "Salsa, Shakira, and the Reach of Latin American Music," Jairo Moreno highlights how Shakira's music represents a fluid transition from Colombia to Latin America and, subsequently, to the world, integrating diverse cultural and musical influences.

== Cultural Identity ==
=== Colombian identity ===
Shakira's Colombian identity is deeply reflected in her work. From her early albums, such as "Pies Descalzos" and "¿Dónde Estás los Ladrones?", Shakira explored Colombian folklore and Latin rhythms blended with pop and rock. Her musical style combines genres such as vallenato, cumbia, and salsa, positioning her as a symbol of Latin culture to the world. By 2001, according to journalist Ximena Diego, Shakira had been named "Colombian artist of the millennium."

In interviews with El Heraldo, she has emphasized her pride in being from Barranquilla and her desire to project a positive image of Colombia. In her song "Hips Don't Lie", Shakira uses elements from Colombian culture, specifically Barranquilla, highlighting masks, costumes, and her Colombian cumbia sound. Shakira has been named "The most famous Colombian in the world", "The most successful Colombian artist in history." and named "the greatest artist in the history of Colombia."

According to The Guardian, "along with an unfortunate popular connection between Colombia and drug lords, coffee and Shakira remain largely positive links that popularize the country." In an Esquire article, journalist Isabella Garcés spoke about how "her music infused optimism and unity into a crumbling nation." She also highlighted Shakira's cultural appeal, which made her a constant in the Colombian zeitgeist of the 1990s, adding that Shakira fueled Colombian pride. Journalists praised her. Politicians saw her as a true example for her generation, and the Colombian national newspaper nominated her as Person of the Year.

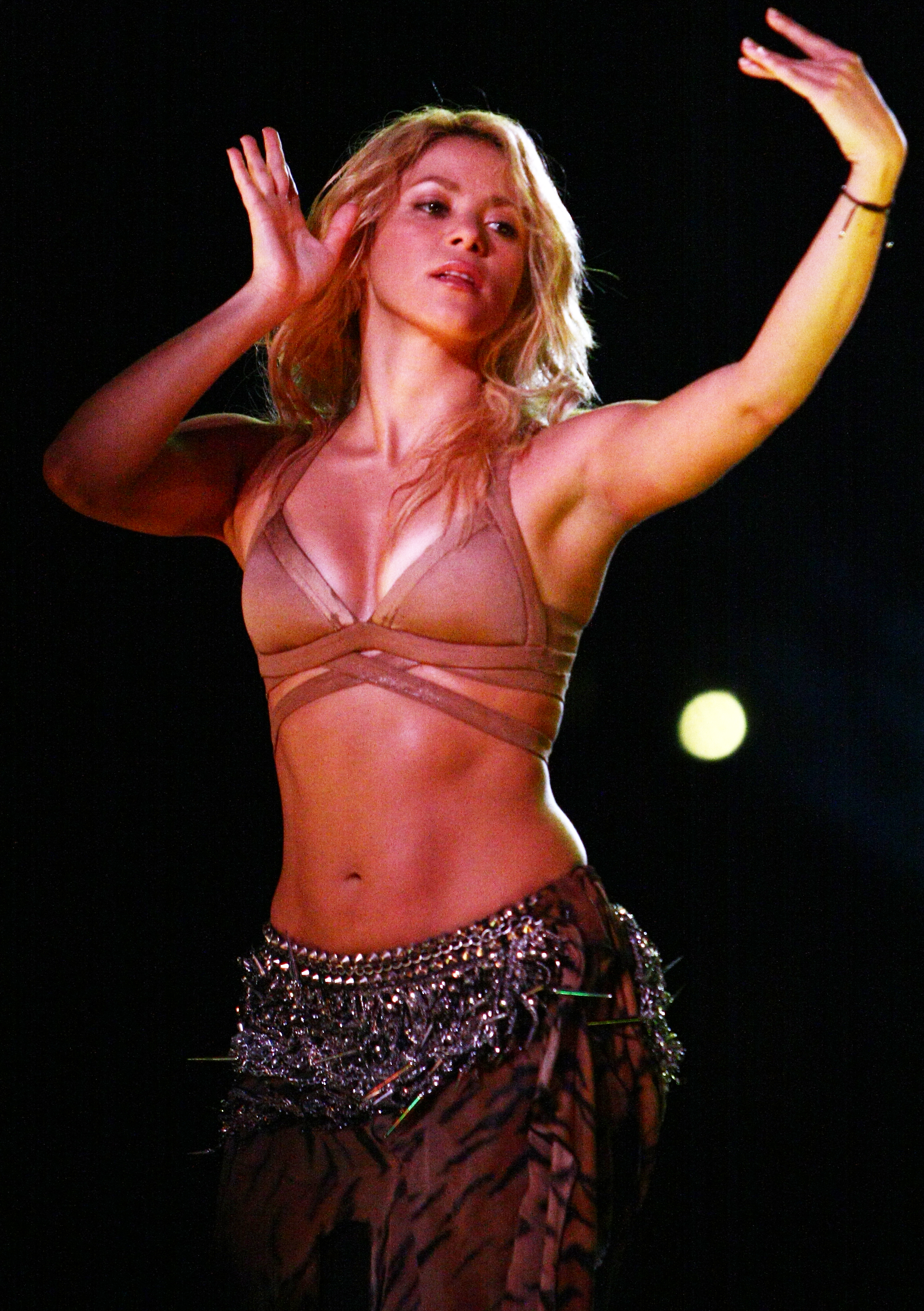
Shakira performing "Ojos Así" during her tour "The Sun Comes Out World Tour"

=== Arabic identity ===
Shakira is of Arab descent, having Lebanese roots on her father's side. Her ancestry was not foreign to her as she grew up with the influence of this culture from her grandmother. Various media outlets immediately noted the notable influence of Lebanese culture on their discography, aesthetics, and live performances, Playwright Victor Hugo wrote about the Arab influence present in Shakira's 2000 Latin Grammys performance. Lorenzo Agar wrote for his 2009 book "Arab Contributions to Ibero-American Identities" highlighting Shakira, attributing to her the credit of having made belly dancing visible in the Latin American context.

In various interviews and presentations, Shakira has made clear her pride in her Arab ancestry, on her visits to Lebanon, she has expressed that she is proud of her roots. She also reclaimed his Arab roots, expressing his admiration for Lebanese singer Fairuz at a New Year's concert in Abu Dhabi. Also in 2008, it was reported that Shakira was planning to record a song in collaboration with Arab-American artist Dania Yusef. The song's goal was to counter negative stereotypes about Arabs and Muslims in the Western media and promote a culture of tolerance.

== Status of icon ==
Described as a "cultural icon" by various media outlets, Shakira has been credited with "redefining" the boundaries of Spanish-language music. Vocal Media called her "A global icon of music and humanity." They also highlighted how her legacy transcends her musical successes, having connected cultures and used her platform to advocate for meaningful change. According to "Radio Nacional de Colombia" Shakira has become a figure whose cultural resonance transcends the borders of her native country, adding that she has woven a sonic narrative that fuses Colombian roots with the globality of pop. Rolling Stone en español magazine called her "The great Latin American icon." Infobae magazine describes her as a "before and after" for the music industry.

She has been the subject of analyses exploring her role as a symbol of cultural hybridity and her positioning as an icon of globalization. In her book "Oye Como Va!: Hybridity and Identity in Latino Popular Music," researcher Devora Pacini Hernández analyzes how Shakira represents a blend of cultural elements (Colombian, Arab, American, and European), also embodying the figure of a "transnational artist." The 2020 book "Gender, Race, and Class in Media: A Critical Reader stated" said "With her Colombian nationality and her status as an American pop culture icon, Shakira embodies a kind of globalized femininity". In her 2010 article "Tracing the Transnational Shakira on Her Path to Globalization," academic professor and writer Monica Gontovnik described the singer as a "transnational product".

== Postmodernism ==
=== Cultural hybridization ===
One of the most notable aspects of Shakira's work is her ability to fuse different musical genres and cultural traditions. This characteristic has been associated with cultural hybridization, a key concept in postmodern theory. Researcher Arlene Dávila, in her chapter "Shakira as the Idealized Transnational Citizen: Media Perspectives," included in Latino Spin: Public Image and the Whitewashing of Race (NYU Press, 2008), argues that Shakira represents a form of idealized transnational citizenship. Her music and image combine elements of her Colombian roots, her Lebanese ancestry, and the aesthetics of international pop, functioning as a symbol of a hybrid global subject.

Likewise, the academic article "Receiving and Resisting: Toward a Market-Driven Cultural Hybridity," published in the International Journal of Cultural Studies, discusses that Shakira exemplifies a form of market-driven hybridization, adapting her image and sound to multiple audiences without losing her distinctive identity. This study emphasizes how her global success is sustained by a postmodern strategy of cultural reappropriation and negotiated authenticity.

=== Intertextuality and visual postmodernism ===
Shakira's aesthetic has also been analyzed in terms of intertextuality, another fundamental feature of postmodern art. Researcher Michael R. Reyes, in his thesis "Intertextuality in the Movie Music Video," argues that Shakira's music videos incorporate cross-references, visual and sonic codes taken from diverse cultural sources, generating new narratives that feed on a network of collective meanings.

On the other hand, the article Lyrical Code-Switching, Multimodal Intertextuality, and Identity in Popular Music, published in MDPI Languages by Aida Dabbous, argues that the use of linguistic code-switching (language mixing) and intertextual visual references in Shakira's songs such as "Hips Don't Lie" and "Waka Waka" position her as an example of an artist who constructs identity in constant dialogue with global and local symbols, a characteristic of postmodern aesthetics.

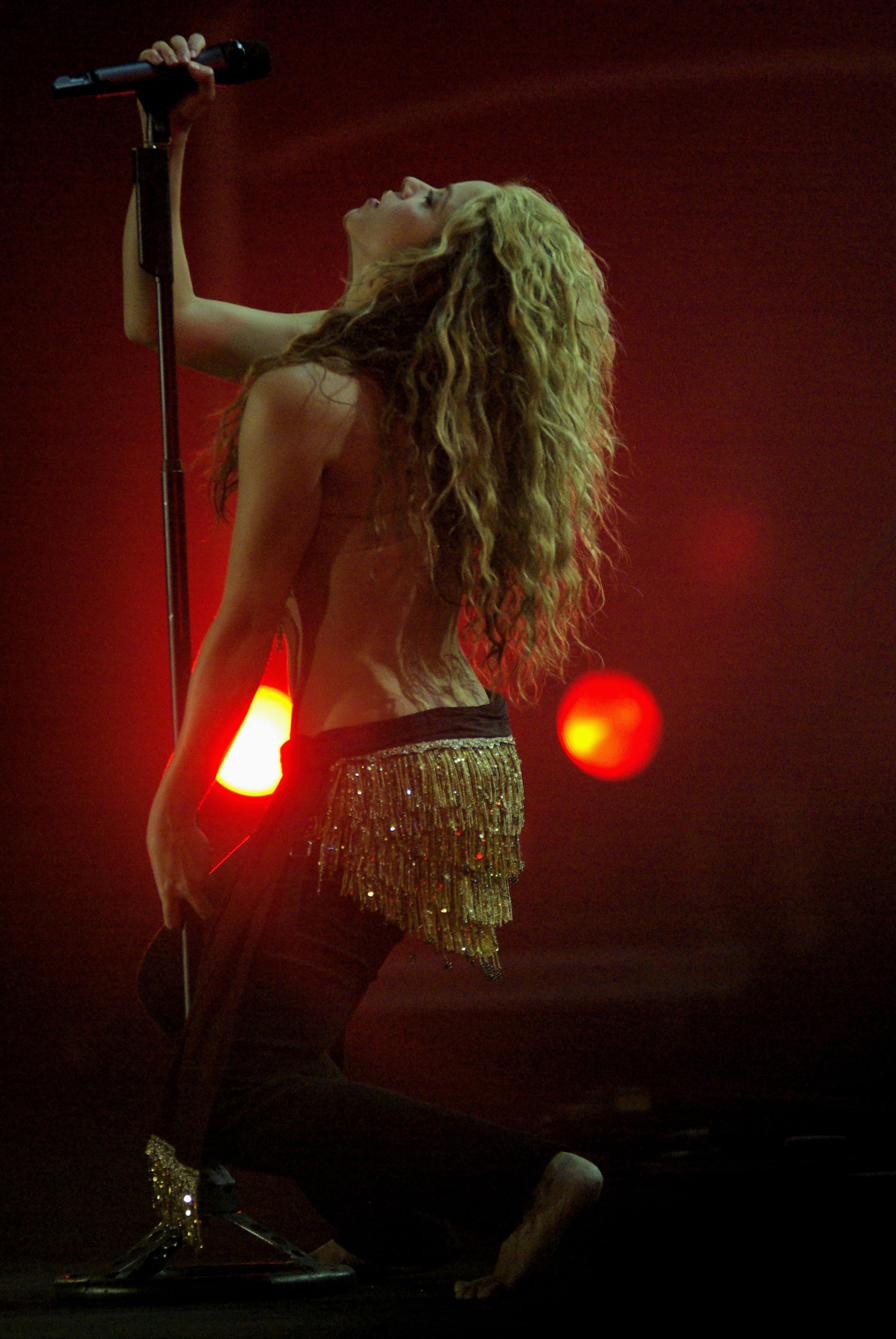
Shakira performing her song "Whenever, Wherever"

=== Representation of identity ===
From a critical perspective, scholars such as Yessica García-Jiménez, in her article "Shakira as the Idealized, Transnational Citizen: A Case Study of Colombianidad in Transition" (2014), argue that Shakira embodies a complex form of national and international identity. According to García-Jiménez, her public persona articulates a "Colombianidad in transition," which combines the traditional with the modern, challenging fixed narratives of nationality, class, and gender.

In the chapter "(Dis)identifying with Shakira's 'Global Body': A Path toward Rhythmic Affiliations beyond the Dichotomous Nation/Diaspora", author Christina Bakolis argues that Shakira's body functions as a "global body" that is inscribed in a postmodern logic, where identity affiliations do not respond to binary categories, but to affective and rhythmic affinities that transcend traditional boundaries.

Emma Louise Backe's Shakira as a Latin Cultural Icon: Navigating Latinidad through Transnational Markets and Multicultural Aesthetics offers a critical reading from a perspective of Latin American cultural studies. Backe argues that Shakira has positioned herself as a transnational icon precisely by negotiating authenticity and Latinidad through aesthetic and commercial strategies. She suggests that Shakira's body, voice, and performance are sites of symbolic production where a form of "flexible Latinidad" is represented, one that engages with the global market as well as with local demands.

== Multiculturalism ==
In addition to her Colombian and Lebanese influences, Shakira has incorporated elements of diverse cultures into her music and performances, enriching her artistic approach and connecting with global audiences. Paola Gavilanes of El Comercio described her as a "musical chameleon," calling the fusion of genres a "weapon."

=== Mexican culture ===
Shakira has displayed a deep connection to Mexican culture throughout her career. In her collaboration "El Jefe" she explored the regional Mexican genre with the group "Fuerza Regida". For her song "(Entre Parentesis)," she wore a Mexican-inspired outfit with the Virgin of Guadalupe on the back of her jacket. She included a mariachi group on MTV Unplugged during her song "Ciega Sordomuda". She also performed seven consecutive shows at the GNP Stadium in Mexico City during her "Las Mujeres Ya No Lloran World Tour" in 2025. During these concerts, she again performed "Ciega, Sordomuda" accompanied by mariachis, paying homage to traditional Mexican music and delighting her local fans. Several Mexican artists have cited Shakira as an inspiration, including Natalia Lafourcade, Paty Cantú, Danna, and Dulce Maria, among others.

=== African Culture ===
Shakira's connection with African music is notable. In 2010, she collaborated with South African band Freshlyground to create "Waka Waka (This Time for Africa)," the official song of the 2010 FIFA World Cup. This song is based on "Zangaléwa," a Cameroonian folk song, and was performed at the tournament's opening and closing ceremonies. Shakira emphasized that the World Cup represents an event with the power to unite and integrate, reflecting the spirit of the song. In her album "Las Mujeres Ya No Lloran" Shakira used the Afrobeat rhythm of Nigeria for her song "Nassau" and later for her single "Soltera". She has recently shown interest in this genre, naming artists such as Burna Boy and the singer Tyla whom she admires.

=== Other cultures ===
Shakira has incorporated music and symbols from various cultures into her discography and videography. In 2001, she incorporated Tango dancing into her song "Objection (Tango)" from her album "Laundry Service". In her video, she also appears dancing tango in a dance hall. For her album "Sale el Sol" Shakira used the sound of the Peruvian song "El Condor Pasa" for her collaborative song with Calle 13 "Gordita", later Shakira used an interpolation during her tour "Las Mujeres Ya No Lloran" when she sings "La Bicicleta". She ventured into the Puerto Rican genre of reggaeton in 2005 for her song "La Tortura" Shakira used the Dominican Republic merengue genre in her songs "Loca", "Rabiosa" and "Addicted To You" in 2010 for her album "Sale el Sol", and later recorded a song with the bachata genre for her song "Deja Vu" with Prince Royce and "Monotonía" with Ozuna. For her 2020 song "Me Gusta" alongside Anuel AA, Shakira used Japanese culture for her music video.

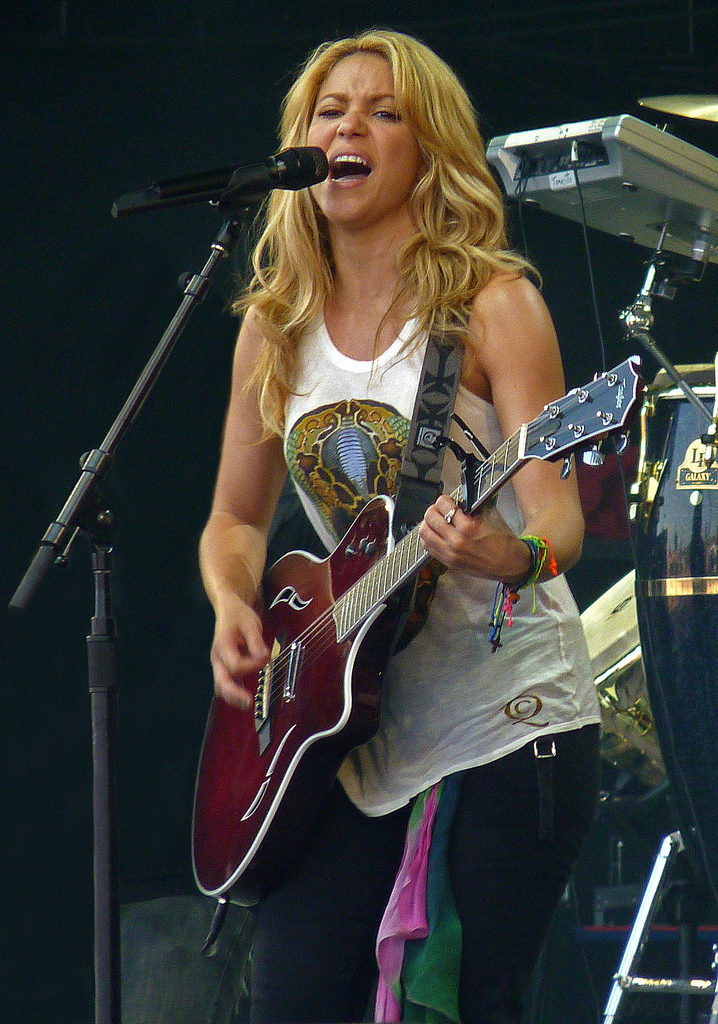
Shakira performing her song "Inevitable" in Glastonbury.

== Controversy and cultural appropriation ==
Shakira's ability to be multicultural for her music despite its great reception and applause from the media and public has also received a negative response for cultural appropriation. Victor Lenore of the newspaper "El Confidencial" highlighted Shakira alongside Madonna and Diplo as artists who "have done everything possible to satisfy the music industry's need for continuous renewal". According to NPR, Shakira is an example of cultural appropriation due to her belly dancing, even though she is Latina, despite her Lebanese ancestry.

Shakira has been criticized for her 2010 FIFA World Cup song, Waka Waka, which garnered mixed reviews due to multiple complaints and opinions about "cultural appropriation." For his book "Reconciling Copyright with Cumulative Creativity," scholar Giancarlo Frosio wrote about the song's cultural appropriation, highlighting that "cultural appropriation and cultural imperialism go hand in hand" with this song. Journalist Kwoh Elonge wrote for the "African Arguments" website that Shakira's song was a "particularly egregious example of global artists copying African art and taking credit for it".

During her 2020 Super Bowl Halftime performance alongside Jennifer Lopez, Shakira was accused of "whitewashing within Latinx communities", The Washington Post said that she perpetuated the marginalization of Afro-Latinos and other people of African descent.

In 2023, when Shakira released the video for her song "El Jefe" with the band Fuerza Regida, she was accused by various internet users of cultural appropriation due to the braids she wore in the video.

== Legacy ==
She is seen as something of a saint in her own country. There are statues to her. Writhing teens love her for putting Latin American dance-music around the world: nuns revere her for building schools for orphans..

— Euan Ferguson, The Guardian, 2009'

Shakira has received extensive media coverage for her impact as a cultural icon. In popular culture, she is cited by some media as having "put Colombia on the musical map". According to Al Día, Shakira represents the universal Latina: a woman who has conquered the world without losing her identity. According to journalist David Alejandro for El Tiempo, Shakira is a universal artist, adding female empowerment, social equity, philanthropy, among others, as part of her. In another article, Flor Ospino reported on the singer's arrival in Barranquilla, adding popular opinions about Shakira, classifying her as "a cultural symbol," "part of the Colombian identity," and "an ambassador who carries the name of Colombia to the entire world." In a 2002 article, Bruce Britt from BMI Foundation wrote that Shakira's multicultural influences have helped Shakira to "shake up the pop world. In 2021, Shakira was awarded as the "image of Colombia to the world" by the Premios Nuestra Tierra.

Shakira became the first Colombian in history to win a Grammy, and she is also the first Colombian in history to have her own star on the Hollywood Walk of Fame. In Maria Elena Cepeda's book she describes how in late 90s, then president of Colombia, Andrés Pastrana hailed Shakira as an "Emblem of a New National Era" for bringing forth a rather positive image to the country despite its "violence-plagued" reality. She has won several awards for her musical career, highlighting her impact on popular culture. One of her most recent is the Ivor Novello Award in 2022, recognizing her career in Spanish and English, paving the way for the next generation of Latin music. Billboard magazine ranked her No. 1 on the "50 Greatest Female Latin Pop Artists of All Time in 2025". In 2024, Shakira was the only Colombian artist to appear on Billboard's "25 Biggest Pop Stars of the 21st Century" list. In 2021, her album ¿Dónde Estás los Ladrones? was the #1 most influential single in the Latinx LGBT community and feminist groups. Various media outlets classify her as a "cultural brand" Writer and journalist Tasha Sandoval talked about how "Shakira's transition to American music taught her to reject her Latin roots and then reclaim them".

By 2024, Shakira became required reading for the history degree in "Latino Studies" at Oxford University, becoming the first and only Latin musical artist to have an article listed in the university's history research database.

In Arab culture her impact is equally great, The book titled "The Cambridge Companion to Modern Arab Culture" by Dwight Reynolds (PhD), Professor of Arabic Language & Literature, by the Cambridge University Press, not only credits Shakira with introducing Middle Eastern rhythms and belly-dancing to the pop culture in the Americas and Europe but also points out the artist's impact on the Arab pop culture. The book names Lebanese singers Myriam Fares, and Nawal El Zoghbi to have echoed Shakira's sound and looks in the Middle East. The book Popular Culture in the Arab World: Arts, Politics, and the Media published by American University in Cairo Press further asserts Shakira's impact on popular culture in the Arab world. Author Andrew Hammond credits the Colombian artist for impacting and shifting the images of Arab pop stars such as Moroccan Samira Said and Lebanese Nawal Al Zoghbi. Shakira is currently considered an Arab icon and, according to The Gulf Mail, a "link" between East and West, crediting her with bringing Arabic sounds to the world.

According to the book "La vida es una danza" after her success in 2001 with "Laundry Service" generated a great impact in Middle Eastern countries, where Shakira "opened the doors" to record labels like EMI to give several artists from countries like India the opportunity to work with them. A 2014 publication titled "The Beauty Trade: Youth, Gender, and Fashion Globalization" published by Oxford University Press by Angela B. McCracken credits Shakira with popularizing Arabic, Hawaiian, and Tahitian dance styles, which are often "body-centered" and have specific dance attire. Her impact reached fashion, where belly dance belts were renamed "Shakira Kemeri" in countries like Türkiye. In Egypt in 2004, Shakira revived the belt trend in the fashion industry. In 2015, the Hard Rock Cafe in Madrid created a burger called "The Odalisca Burger," inspired by Shakira's Arabic roots.

== See also ==
- Cultural impact of Shakira
- Analysis of Shakira's musical work
- Fandom of Shakira
