= Nassau (song) =

2024 song by Shakira

Song by Shakira

from the album Las Mujeres Ya No Lloran
- Released: March 22, 2024
- Genre: Afrobeat
- Length: 2:36
- Label: Sony Music Latin
- Songwriters: Shakira; Marcos Efraín Masís Fernández; Alberto Carlos Melendez; The Roommates; Aldae; Carolina Isabel Colón Juarbe; Daniela Blau; Kevyn Cruz; Taylor Monét Parks
- Producers: Tainy; Albert Hype; The Roommates; Shakira

Audio video
- "Nassau" on YouTube

"Nassau" is an Afrobeat song by Colombian singer-songwriter Shakira. The song was released on 22 March 2024 as a part of Shakira's twelfth studio album, Las Mujeres Ya No Lloran. A song with pop influences and tropical elements, its lyrics talk about finding new love after a heartbreak.

== Background and release ==
"Nassau" was first revealed on 29 February 2024, when Shakira unveiled the tracklist of her next album, Las Mujeres Ya No Lloran. Shakira reflected on the album creation process as an "alchemical process" of "rebuilding herself": "My tears became diamonds and my vulnerability became resilience." On 5 March 2024, Shakira published a preview of "Nassau" on her official social media platforms with pictures of her being on a beach. She described the song as "her take on afrobeat". The preview included lyrics about healing wounds of love when she wasn't open to relationships.

The preview of "Nassau" was met with enthusiasm for its genre and danceability, with Cristopher Johnson from WEBC Radio describing it as an "afrobeat that we will get tired of singing and dancing to this spring in our trusted nightclubs", and Alina Maldonado from Los 40 portraying it as an "afrobeat we’ll be singing and dancing to endlessly this spring".

== Composition and lyrics ==
"Nassau" is an Afrobeat song with pop influences, tropical elements and dreamy vocals. Lyrically, the song conveys the impact of love, reflecting Shakira's ability to move forward and embrace new possibilities. The lyrics "Yo que había prometido que nunca más volvería a querer Apareciste tú a sanar las heridas que dejó aquel" (English: "I, who vowed not to love again, found you, and you mended the wounds left by someone else") illustrate the theme of healing from past experiences and opening up to new love. Thematically, the lyrics also explore self-empowerment and personal freedom.

The title of "Nassau" comes from Nassau, the capital of The Bahamas, where Shakira lived with her ex Antonio de la Rúa for years. Nassau was also where Shakira and her ex Gerard Piqué met in to discuss their children's custody after breaking up in 2022.

Originally written in English several years before, "Nassau" was translated to Spanish by Shakira and Puerto Rican composer Gale. The lyrics of "Nassau" having a sharp contrast with Shakira's previous singles like "Monotonía", "Shakira: Bzrp Music Sessions, Vol. 53", "Copa Vacía" and "TQG" about her break-up with Gerard Piqué sparked rumors about Shakira teasing a new romance and being in love again, or that the lyrics could be inspired by her relationship with de la Rúa.

== Reception ==
Pablo Gil from El Mundo called the song 'chill', noting its lyrics about "love and desire". Billboard's writers highlighted the song's "soothing tropical melody" and reflected on the song possibly being a sequel to Shakira's single "Monotonía" due to both songs having lyrics about her locked heart. Suzy Exposito from Rolling Stone emphasized on the song's "haunted tropical feel". Thania Garcia from Variety depicted how Shakira's "star power shines through the most" on "Nassau", detailing how she "appears more confident than ever". María Porcel from El País described it as "a light song to a new love with which to get lost 'on an island without a signal'". Danny Barros from Infobae commented the song's message is "direct and powerful".

== Certifications ==
Certifications for "Nassau"
Region	Certification	Certified units/sales
United States (RIAA)	Gold (Latin)	30,000^{‡}
^{‡} Sales+streaming figures based on certification alone.
