= Cohete =

2024 song by Shakira and Rauw Alejandro

Song by Shakira and Rauw Alejandro

from the album Las Mujeres Ya No Lloran
- Released: March 22, 2024
- Genre: Electropop; Disco
- Length: 2:52
- Label: Sony Music Latin
- Songwriters: Shakira; Yeti Beats; Rauw Alejandro; Caceres; Vibarco
- Producers: Shakira; Yeti Beats; Troy Nōka

Audio video
- "Cohete" on YouTube

"Cohete" (English: "Rocket") is a song by Colombian singer-songwriter Shakira and Puerto Rican singer-songwriter Rauw Alejandro. The song was released on 22 March 2024 as a part of Shakira's twelfth studio album, Las Mujeres Ya No Lloran. The song marks the second collaboration of the singers following the album's lead single "Te Felicito", released in 2022.

== Background and release ==
"Cohete" is an electropop song written by Shakira, Yeti Beats, Caceres and Vibarco, and produced by Shakira, Yeti Beats and Troy Nōka. The song marks the second collaboration between Shakira and Rauw Alejandro after "Te Felicito", with both songs being featured on Shakira's twelfth studio album, Las Mujeres Ya No Lloran. Shakira commented on the album's recording process as following: "When writing each song, I rebuilt myself. When I sang them, my tears transformed into diamonds and my vulnerability into resilience."

On 22 February 2024 at the 36th Lo Nuestro Awards ceremony, Rauw Alejandro teased that he will have a new song coming out with Shakira "very soon". On 27 February 2024, Shakira announced on her official social media profiles that a new song titled "Cohete" with Rauw Alejandro will be on her next studio album, Las Mujeres Ya No Lloran. She described the song as "pure bass and beats" with being "light pop, lighter pop, a song that has a retro sound, a little funk" "mixed within a dance and electronic context". She also teased that the song will have a mix of fantasy and metaphor, and that has an "imprint that gives it a personality that differentiates it from other genres".

== Reception ==
Pablo Gil from El Mundo characterized the song as "infectious and cool discopop", describing the song's soundscape as universally likeable. Billboard's writers called the song a "a pulsating pop anthem" "loaded with infectious beats and a swoon-worthy melody", praised the "vivid picture" the song's lyrics paint while outlining the song as a "a cosmic journey fueled by love and dance-pop brilliance", noting also the futuristic and "metallic hues" of the instrumental. Suzy Exposito from Rolling Stone emphasized the song having a "crystalline dance-pop luster". Thania Garcia from Variety depicted how the song has "sugary pop melodies that [make] for an easy listen", comparing it to "Puntería". Lucas Villa from NME inscribed the song as a 'dazzling' "blast of feel-good pop", praising Shakira and Rauw for "[continuing] to charm with their irresistible chemistry" on their second collaboration. María Porcel from El País reflected on Shakira and Rauw being a "classic confrontational duo", while denoting that the song is "more poppy than Latin". Felipe Torres Vargas from Radio Uno Bogotá encapsulated the song as an "explosive collaboration", taking note on its "unique and contagious sound" and stating that it has "a perfect mix of light pop with a retro and funky touch".

== Charts ==
Chart performance for "Cohete"
Chart (2024)	Peak position
Spain (PROMUSICAE)	28
US Hot Latin Songs (Billboard)	48

== Certifications ==
Certifications for "Cohete"
Region	Certification	Certified units/sales
United States (RIAA)	Platinum (Latin)	60,000^{‡}
^{‡} Sales+streaming figures based on certification alone.
