= (Entre Paréntesis) =

Single by Shakira and Grupo Frontera

from the album Las Mujeres Ya No Lloran
- Released: 25 March 2024
- Genre: Regional Mexican; Norteño; Mexican cumbia
- Length: 2:48
- Label: Sony Latin
- Songwriters: Shakira; Kevyn Cruz; Édgar Barrera; Yohanes Manuel; Lenin Yorney Palacios
- Producers: Edge; Keityn; Shakira

Shakira singles chronology
"Puntería" (2024)	"(Entre Paréntesis)" (2024)	"Soltera" (2024)

Grupo Frontera singles chronology
"Ya Pedo Quién Sabe" (2024)	"(Entre Paréntesis)" (2024)	"No Hay Vato Perfecto" (2024)

Music video
- "(Entre Paréntesis)" on YouTube

"(Entre Paréntesis)" (English: "(In Parentheses)") is a song by Colombian singer-songwriter Shakira and Tejano regional Mexican band Grupo Frontera. The song was initially released on 22 March 2024 as a part of Shakira's twelfth studio album, Las Mujeres Ya No Lloran, before being released as the album's seventh single on 25 March. It serves as the second focus track of the album.

== Background and release ==
"(Entre Paréntesis)" is a regional Mexican song and the first collaboration between Shakira and Grupo Frontera. The song marks the third time Shakira explores Mexican music, the first time being with "Ciega, Sordomuda", the lead single of her fourth studio album Dónde Están Los Ladrones? (1998), and the second one being "El Jefe", a single also featured on her twelfth studio album Las Mujeres Ya No Lloran.

"(Entre Paréntesis)" was first announced on 29 February 2024 when Shakira shared the tracklist of her twelfth album, Las Mujeres Ya No Lloran. She described the album's creation process as an "alchemic process", where she "reconstructed herself" with each song, and "while singing them, turned [her] tears to diamonds and vulnerability to strength".

On 2 March 2024, Grupo Frontera shared a teaser video of the song at their concert at the sold-out Bésame Mucho music festival in Austin, Texas. The video featured Shakira who shared a message with the concert audience, presenting a preview of the song. After that, the band played a snippet of the song, and finished the performance with the phrase "Grupo Frontera con La Loba". Silvia Sanchez from Red Uno predicted based on the snippet alone that the song will be a success on both regional Mexican and pop genres.

In an interview for Billboard, Grupo Frontera proclaimed their excitement to work with Shakira, adding that they "have been fans of hers since [they] can remember, she has always been the top and it has been an honor to have collaborated with her". Shakira herself called the song "[her] little tribute to the regional Mexican genre that [she] likes so much".

"(Entre Paréntesis)" was released as the seventh single of Las Mujeres Ya No Lloran on 25 March 2024. The release was accompanied with a music video.

== Reception ==
Suzy Exposito from Rolling Stone called the song "dejection cumbia" and took note of Shakira's 'vulnerability' on the track. Billboard described the song as "melancholic cumbia-norteño" and rated it the third best song on the album. Thanka Garcia from Variety reflected on the song showing Shakira's "commitment to studying the current Latin pop landscape" alongside the singles "Monotonía" and "El Jefe". Lucas Villa from NME encapsulated the song as a "norteña-cumbia tearjerker". María Porcel from El País stated that it is one of Shakira's "most personal songs", observing how Grupo Frontera calls Shakira "La Loba" at the end of the song, and Shakira closing the song "with her classic howl". Upon the song's release as a single, G. Pacheco from Excélsior emphasized how "(Entre Paréntesis)" is "already shaping up to be an anthem of empowerment and passion".

== Music video ==
The music video for "(Entre Paréntesis)" was released on 25 March 2024. The video has scenes, the first of which features a mechanics workshop where Shakira is an operator, and the second is a concert featuring Grupo Frontera, where she takes the stage and electrifies the audience with her performance.

== Charts ==
Chart performance for "(Entre Paréntesis)"
Chart (2024)	Peak position
Bolivia Airplay (Monitor Latino)	1
Central America Airplay (Monitor Latino)	8
Costa Rica Airplay (Monitor Latino)	5
El Salvador Airplay (Monitor Latino)	1
Guatemala Airplay (Monitor Latino)	9
Mexico Airplay (Monitor Latino)	1
Nicaragua Airplay (Monitor Latino)	14
Perú Airplay (Monitor Latino)	12
Uruguay Airplay (Monitor Latino)	17
US Bubbling Under Hot 100 (Billboard)	20
US Hot Latin Songs (Billboard)	22
US Latin Airplay (Billboard)	1
US Regional Mexican Airplay (Billboard)	1
US Latin Airplay (Monitor Latino)	3

== Certifications ==
Certifications for "(Entre Paréntesis)"
Region	Certification	Certified units/sales
Colombia	Gold	
Mexico (AMPROFON)	Platinum+Gold	210,000^{‡}
United States (RIAA)	4× Platinum (Latin)	240,000^{‡}
Streaming
Central America (CFC)	Gold	3,500,000^{†}
^{‡} Sales+streaming figures based on certification alone.^{†} Streaming-only figures based on certification alone.
