= La Fuerte =

2024 song by Shakira and Bizarrap

Song by Shakira and Bizarrap

from the album Las Mujeres Ya No Lloran
- Released: March 22, 2024
- Genre: Electropop
- Length: 2:44
- Label: Sony Music Latin
- Songwriters: Shakira; Kevyn Cruz; Alberto Carlos Melendez; Leonardo Zapata
- Producers: Bizarrap; Shakira

Audio video
- "La Fuerte" on YouTube

"La Fuerte" (English: "The Strong") is a song by Colombian singer-songwriter Shakira and Argentine DJ Bizarrap. The song was released on 22 March 2024 as a part of Shakira's twelfth studio album, Las Mujeres Ya No Lloran. The song marks the second collaboration of the artists following their 2023 single "Shakira: Bzrp Music Sessions, Vol. 53".

== Background and release ==
"La Fuerte" is an electropop song with EDM influences produced by Shakira and Bizarrap. It was initially revealed on 29 February 2024, when Shakira shared the tracklist of her twelfth studio album, Las Mujeres Ya No Lloran, on her social media accounts. On 15 March, Shakira posted a preview of the song on her social media accounts. She presented the song with the words "Bizarrap always knows how to get me La Fuerte". The preview was posted alongside pictures of Shakira arm-wrestling with a man while donning a light brown dress with silver details.

Based on the preview, Agencia Excélsior portrayed "La Fuerte" as a "nostalgic song" that "has all the rhythm". La Vanguardia described how it "reveals a more intimate and emotional side of Shakira, showing her vulnerability and sincerity around her personal experiences". Raul Campos from La Razón de México inscribed it as "a tremendous song that may surpass their first collaboration", an opinion also expressed by Emiliana Tuñón from Telemetro. Andrea Torrecilla from ¡Hola! predicted the song "to be a piece full of emotions and depth". La Radio de Portland described that the preview "sounds like a collaboration that promises to be powerful and full of energy". Solange Garrido from Página 7 compared the preview to the musical output of Kylie Minogue and David Guetta. La Voz de Tarija outlined that it has a "marked bass and a danceable rhythm".

The lyrics of the preview about heartbreak sparked speculation that the topic of the song might be Shakira's ex-partner Gerard Piqué. On 15 April 2025, Dream Games released a television advertisement featuring Shakira and her song "La Fuerte" promoting the video game Royal Kingdom.

== Live performances ==
On 12 April 2024, Shakira made a surprise appearance on Bizarrap's Coachella set, where they performed "La Fuerte" and "Shakira: Bzrp Music Sessions, Vol. 53". The Straits Times described how Shakira "wows at Coachella" with her "powerful, dance-heavy performance". The song is also the opener of her Las Mujeres Ya No Lloran World Tour.

== Reception ==
Billboard described the song as "club-ready", describing how it "starts off with a magnetic head-bobbing dance beat that powers the track and serves as a canvas for Shak’s piercing lyrics". Pablo Gil from El Mundo inscribed the song as, "discopop, although with a sound more oriented towards 90s Europop", likening it to "a first cousin" of "Shakira: Bzrp Music Sessions, Vol. 53". María Porcel from El País called the collaboration "one of the most anticipated songs on the new album".

== Charts ==
Chart performance for "La Fuerte"
Chart (2024)	Peak position
Argentina Hot 100 (Billboard)	95
Spain (PROMUSICAE)	67

== Certifications ==
Certifications for "La Fuerte"
Region	Certification	Certified units/sales
United States (RIAA)	Gold (Latin)	30,000^{‡}
^{‡} Sales+streaming figures based on certification alone.
