= Última (song) =

2025 song by Shakira

Promotional single by Shakira

from the album Las Mujeres Ya No Lloran
- Released: 22 March 2025
- Genre: Latin pop
- Length: 2:58
- Label: Ace; Sony Latin
- Songwriters: Cristian Camilo Alvarez; Kevyn Cruz; Shakira
- Producers: Ciey; Shakira

Shakira promotional singles chronology
| "Estoy Aquí (Remix)" (2025) | "Última" (2025) | "Bésame" (2025) |

Music video
- "Última" on YouTube

"Última" (English: "Last One") is a Latin pop song by Colombian singer-songwriter Shakira. It was released on 22 March 2025 as a promotional single from Shakira's twelfth studio album, Las Mujeres Ya No Lloran.

== Background and release ==
"Última" was initially announced on 29 February 2024, when Shakira shared the tracklist of her twelfth studio album, Las Mujeres Ya No Lloran, on her social media accounts. The song is one of the two piano ballads on the album, the other one being "Acróstico", and the last song she wrote for the album. Shakira shared that creating the album was an "alchemical process" and that she "rebuilt herself" writing each song: "As I sang them, my tears were transformed into diamonds and my vulnerability into resilience".

"Última" is written about Shakira's ex-partner Gerard Piqué, who she was in a relationship with for 11 years and who she separated from following his infidelity. Lyrically the song is a heartfelt ballad in which she bids a final farewell to the retired soccer player. She said in an interview that she hopes it's the last song she'll write about him. Before creating the song she felt that she had to create it: "I have to spit it out or I won't be able to do it, you know, I'll choke". Being able to finish the song was "a great relief" for her.

On 19 March, Shakira posted a preview of the song on her social media accounts. Based on the preview, Judith del Rio from La Vanguardia called the song "the final farewell to her great love". Europa FM emphasized how in the song Shakira "shows that all the pain that [Piqué] has caused her is definitively behind her".

During an interview with Zane Lowe on Apple Music 1, Shakira discussed why "Última" will be the last song she writes about Piqué: despite pressure from her record label to finish her album Las Mujeres Ya No Lloran, Shakira insisted on including the song and ultimately recorded and mixed it in one afternoon. When she shared the song with Sony Latin, the head of marketing cried, leading Shakira to reflect that the song is not just about her, and how music can have a universal connection and emotional impact on people.

== Reception ==
Pablo Gil from El Mundo described the song as a "piano ballad with a soap opera echo", adding that it's perhaps the most 'morbid' song on the album. Thania Garcia from Variety depicted how the 'confessional' "Última" is one of the two "most vulnerable songs" on the album alongside "Acróstico". Lucas Villa from NME emphasized that "Shakira is one of Latin music’s most prolific and poetic songwriters, and she offers the most insight into her breakup with Piqué on the heartbreaking ballad", outlining how she "sounds like she’s on the verge of tears as she reflects on what went wrong" on the song.

On 23 June 2024, Rolling Stone included "Última" on their list of great songs of 2024 by Spanish-speaking artists that far.

== Music video ==
On 30 March 2024, Shakira was seen filming the music video for "Última" in the New York City Subway at nighttime. Wearing a black coat, she was shivering in the cold wind yet appeared dedicated to her work. The music video, co-directed by Shakira and Jaume de la Iguana, was released on 22 March 2025, a year after the album's release.

== Charts ==
Chart performance for "Última"
| Chart (2024–2025) | Peak position |
|---|---|
| Spain (TopHit) | 83 |
| US Latin Digital Songs (Billboard) | 9 |
| US Latin Pop Airplay (Billboard) | 18 |

== Certifications ==
Certifications for "Última"
| Region | Certification | Certified units/sales |
|---|---|---|
| United States (RIAA) | Platinum (Latin) | 60,000^{‡} |
^{‡} Sales+streaming figures based on certification alone.
