= La Razón =

La Razón (Spanish: "Reason") is used as a name for newspapers in the Spanish-speaking world including:

- La Razón (Buenos Aires), Argentina
- La Razón (La Paz), Bolivia
- La Razón (Lima), Perú
- La Razón (Madrid), Spain
- La Razón (Mexico City), Mexico
