= Tiempo Sin Verte =

2024 song by Shakira

Song by Shakira

from the album Las Mujeres Ya No Lloran
- Released: March 22, 2024
- Genre: Latin pop; Rock en español
- Length: 3:16
- Label: Sony Music Latin
- Songwriters: Shakira; Marcos Efraín Masís Fernández; Jota Rosa; Richi López; Elena Rose; Albert Hype
- Producers: Tainy; Albert Hype; Shakira

Audio video
- "Tiempo Sin Verte" on YouTube

"Tiempo Sin Verte" ("Time Without Seeing You") is a song by Colombian singer-songwriter Shakira. The song was released on 22 March 2024 as a part of Shakira's twelfth studio album, Las Mujeres Ya No Lloran.

== Background and release ==
"Tiempo Sin Verte" was first announced on 29 February 2024, when Shakira posted the tracklist of her album Las Mujeres Ya No Lloran online. On 14 March, Shakira posted a preview video of the song on her social media, with the video showcasing photos of her in a blue braided dress. The preview sparked enthusiasm among her fans, who praised the song calling it "a favourite on the album" and "an anthem" among others.

According to Shakira, the song has a sound that is "very much hers", marking rock and pop influences and romantic lyrics. Andrea Romero from Los 40 described the melody of the song as "very reminiscent of the first pop songs" that Shakira released in the 90s, a feature also noted by the NTN24 Editorial, while epitomizing it as "the song that reflects her purest essence". Blanca Lopez from Cadena 100 commented on Shakira going back to the rhythms of her albums Sale el Sol and El Dorado with the song. Daniel Ospina from Infobae outlined that "Tiempo Sin Verte" could be "one of the most optimistic and romantic tracks" of the album.

Thematically the song is about acceptance of guilt and the end of a relationship, with lyrics about the pain and longing of being apart from a loved one, and about realizing that more could have been done to make the relationship work. The lyrics of this song alluding to a past romantic relationship led to speculation that "Tiempo Sin Verte" is either written about Shakira's ex-boyfriend Gerard Piqué or about a new boyfriend she has.

"Tiempo Sin Verte" was released as the third track of Shakira's twelfth studio album, Las Mujeres Ya No Lloran, on 22 March 2024. Shakira reflected on the album's songs' creation process as "rebuilding herself": "When I sang them, my tears transformed into diamonds and my vulnerability into resilience".

== Reception ==
Pablo Gil from El Mundo took note on the song sounding 'old' and called it a nod to the fans of Shakira's older music.. Billboard's writers ranked the song as the 4th best on the album, and reflected on how the song returns "to the pop rock sound that characterized Shakira in the early ‘90s", inscribing its "punchy alternative track fused with subtle dance melodies" while also noting her "potent rockera vocals".
