= List of number-one singles of 2023 (Spain) =

This lists the singles that reached number one on the Spanish PROMUSICAE sales and airplay charts in 2023. Total sales correspond to the data sent by regular contributors to sales volumes and by digital distributors.

== Chart history ==
Week	Issue date	Top Streaming, Downloads & Physical Sales			Most Airplay		
Week	Issue date	Artist(s)	Song	Ref.	Artist(s)	Song	Ref.
1	December 30	Manuel Turizo	"La Bachata"		Manuel Turizo	"La Bachata"	
2	January 6	Bizarrap and Shakira	"Shakira: Bzrp Music Sessions, Vol. 53"		Manuel Turizo	"La Bachata"	
3	January 13	Bizarrap and Shakira	"Shakira: Bzrp Music Sessions, Vol. 53"		Manuel Turizo	"La Bachata"	
4	January 20	Bizarrap and Shakira	"Shakira: Bzrp Music Sessions, Vol. 53"		Bizarrap and Shakira	"Shakira: Bzrp Music Sessions, Vol. 53"	
5	January 27	Bizarrap and Shakira	"Shakira: Bzrp Music Sessions, Vol. 53"		Bizarrap and Shakira	"Shakira: Bzrp Music Sessions, Vol. 53"	
6	February 3	Bizarrap and Shakira	"Shakira: Bzrp Music Sessions, Vol. 53"		Bizarrap and Shakira	"Shakira: Bzrp Music Sessions, Vol. 53"	
7	February 10	Bizarrap and Shakira	"Shakira: Bzrp Music Sessions, Vol. 53"		Bizarrap and Shakira	"Shakira: Bzrp Music Sessions, Vol. 53"	
8	February 17	Bizarrap and Shakira	"Shakira: Bzrp Music Sessions, Vol. 53"		Bizarrap and Shakira	"Shakira: Bzrp Music Sessions, Vol. 53"	
9	February 24	Karol G and Shakira	"TQG"		Bizarrap and Shakira	"Shakira: Bzrp Music Sessions, Vol. 53"	
10	March 3	Karol G and Shakira	"TQG"		Bizarrap and Shakira	"Shakira: Bzrp Music Sessions, Vol. 53"	
11	March 10	Karol G and Shakira	"TQG"		Miley Cyrus	"Flowers"	
12	March 17	Karol G and Shakira	"TQG"		Miley Cyrus	"Flowers"	
13	March 24	Rosalía and Rauw Alejandro	"Beso"		Miley Cyrus	"Flowers"	
14	March 31	Rosalía and Rauw Alejandro	"Beso"		Vicco	"Nochentera"	
15	April 7	Rosalía and Rauw Alejandro	"Beso"		Miley Cyrus	"Flowers"	
16	April 14	Lola Índigo featuring Quevedo	"El Tonto"		Miley Cyrus	"Flowers"	
17	April 21	Lola Índigo featuring Quevedo	"El Tonto"		Miley Cyrus	"Flowers"	
18	April 28	Saiko	"Supernova"		Vicco	"Nochentera"	
19	May 5	Lola Índigo featuring Quevedo	"El Tonto"		Miley Cyrus	"Flowers"	
20	May 12	Lola Índigo featuring Quevedo	"El Tonto"		Vicco	"Nochentera"	
21	May 19	Shakira	"Acróstico"		Vicco	"Nochentera"	
22	May 26	Bad Bunny	"Where She Goes"		Vicco	"Nochentera"	
23	June 2	Bad Bunny	"Where She Goes"		Manuel Turizo featuring Marshmello	"El Merengue"	
24	June 9	Saiko, Feid, Quevedo and Mora	"Polaris" (Remix)		Miley Cyrus	"Flowers"	
25	June 16	Saiko, Feid, Quevedo and Mora	"Polaris" (Remix)		Vicco	"Nochentera"	
26	June 23	Bizarrap and Rauw Alejandro	"Rauw Alejandro: Bzrp Music Sessions, Vol. 56"		Chanel and Abraham Mateo	"Clavaito"	
27	June 30	Myke Towers	"Lala"		David Guetta, Anne-Marie and Coi Leray	"Baby Don't Hurt Me"	
28	July 7	Quevedo	"Columbia"		Manuel Turizo featuring Marshmello	"El Merengue"	
29	July 14	Quevedo	"Columbia"		Manuel Turizo featuring Marshmello	"El Merengue"	
30	July 21	Quevedo	"Columbia"		Manuel Turizo featuring Marshmello	"El Merengue"	
31	July 28	Quevedo	"Columbia"		Manuel Turizo featuring Marshmello	"El Merengue"	
32	August 4	Quevedo	"Columbia"		Manuel Turizo featuring Marshmello	"El Merengue"	
33	August 11	Quevedo	"Columbia"		Sebastián Yatra, Manuel Turizo and Beéle	"Vagabundo"	
34	August 18	Quevedo	"Columbia"		Sebastián Yatra, Manuel Turizo and Beéle	"Vagabundo"	
35	August 25	Quevedo	"Columbia"		Chanel and Abraham Mateo	"Clavaíto"	
36	September 1	Mora and Saiko	"Reina"		Dua Lipa	"Dance the Night"	
37	September 8	Mora and Saiko	"Reina"		Manuel Turizo featuring Marshmello	"El Merengue"	
38	September 15	Mora and Saiko	"Reina"		Sebastián Yatra, Manuel Turizo and Beéle	"Vagabundo"	
39	September 22	Quevedo and Saiko	"Buenas"		Sebastián Yatra, Manuel Turizo and Beéle	"Vagabundo"	
40	September 29	Iñigo Quintero	"Si No Estás"		Sebastián Yatra, Manuel Turizo and Beéle	"Vagabundo"	
41	October 6	Iñigo Quintero	"Si No Estás"		Manuel Turizo featuring Marshmello	"El Merengue"	
42	October 13	Bad Bunny	"Mónaco"		Manuel Turizo featuring Marshmello	"El Merengue"	
43	October 20	Iñigo Quintero	"Si No Estás"		Sebastián Yatra, Manuel Turizo and Beéle	"Vagabundo"	
44	October 27	Iñigo Quintero	"Si No Estás"		Sebastián Yatra, Manuel Turizo and Beéle	"Vagabundo"	
45	November 3	Iñigo Quintero	"Si No Estás"		Dua Lipa	"Dance the Night"	
46	November 10	Iñigo Quintero	"Si No Estás"		Manuel Turizo featuring Marshmello	"El Merengue"	
47	November 17	Iñigo Quintero	"Si No Estás"		Ana Mena	"Madrid City"	
48	November 24	Iñigo Quintero	"Si No Estás"		Ana Mena	"Madrid City"	
49	December 1	Dellafuente/Morad	"Manos Rotas"		Ana Mena	"Madrid City"	
50	December 8	Dellafuente/Morad	"Manos Rotas"		Ana Mena	"Madrid City"	
51	December 15	Dellafuente/Morad	"Manos Rotas"		Sebastián Yatra, Manuel Turizo and Beéle	"Vagabundo"	
52	December 22	Dellafuente/Morad	"Manos Rotas"		Ana Mena	"Madrid City"	
1	December 29	Dellafuente/Morad	"Manos Rotas"		Ana Mena	"Madrid City"	
