= Copa Vacía =

Single by Shakira and Manuel Turizo

from the album Las Mujeres Ya No Lloran
- Language: Spanish
- English title: "Empty Cup"
- Released: June 30, 2023
- Studio: A2F Studios (Miami, FL)
- Genre: Reggaeton
- Length: 2:54
- Label: Sony Latin
- Songwriters: Shakira; DallasK; Gale; Daniela Blau; Manuel Turizo; Slow Mike; Julian Turizo; Juan Diego Medina
- Producers: Shakira; DallasK; Slow Mike

Shakira singles chronology
"Acróstico" (2023)	"Copa Vacía" (2023)	"El Jefe" (2023)

Manuel Turizo singles chronology
"Bentley (Remix)" (2023)	"Copa Vacía" (2023)	"De Lunes a Lunes" (2023)

Music video
- "Copa Vacía" on YouTube

"Copa Vacía" (English: "Empty Cup") is a song by Colombian singers Shakira and Manuel Turizo. The song was released on June 30, 2023, through Sony Music Latin as the fourth single from Shakira's twelfth studio album, Las Mujeres Ya No Lloran (2024).

== Background and release ==
Following the release of "Shakira: Bzrp Music Sessions, Vol. 53" with Bizarrap and "TQG" with Karol G, Shakira confirmed that she had a song with Manuel Turizo titled "Copa Vacía", set to be released later in 2023. In February, the song's cover art leaked, while in March, images of the music video began to leak. Rumors started circulating that the song would be released soon and it was expected that it would be in April 2023, since Manuel Turizo has his birthday in that month. However, due to the massive leaks, the song was not released then. Plans were eventually scrapped in favor of the release of Shakira's single "Acróstico" on May 12, 2023.

On June 9, 2023, the singer shared a photo of herself as a mermaid on her social media that says "You want thingamabobs? I got twenty...". On June 15, she shared a new preview of the song.

The single was announced on June 19, scheduled to be released on June 29, 2023. She also announced that the duo "made a movie", referring to the music video.

== Music video ==
The music video was co-directed by Shakira and Jaume de la Iguana. Its cinematography was handled by Rafa Lluch. On June 28, just one day before its release, he publishes a preview of the song's video, and in it you can see a partially sunny day in a sea where Manuel Turizo submerges in the water and Shakira is found swimming like mermaid and takes her out of the water and they stay on a seashore. Also in another part of that video you can see Shakira sirena tied up as it appears on the cover.

The official music video was released simultaneously with the single on June 29, 2023. Its premiere establishment had been scheduled a few hours before. In the video, we can see Shakira dressed as a mermaid with pink hair. At the beginning, the singer is seen lying on the shore of a sea full of garbage and singing. Later, we see Manuel Turizo who submerges himself in the sea water and meets a mermaid and takes her out of the sea water and takes her with him. Throughout the video, Manuel Turizo is seen singing in a chair in a shelter next to Shakira, who has her in a fish tank. Later, Shakira and Manuel Turizo can be seen singing in a cave and dancing. At the end of the video, Shakira is seen as she appears on the cover of the song, dressed as a mermaid and tied by her hands.

== Accolades ==
"Copa Vacía"
Year	Ceremony	Award	Result	Ref.
2023	Los 40 Music Awards	Best Video	Nominated	

== Charts ==
Chart performance for "Copa Vacía"
Chart (2023)	Peak position
Argentina Hot 100 (Billboard)	36
Argentina Airplay (Monitor Latino)	1
Belgium (Ultratop 50 Wallonia)	42
Bolivia Airplay (Monitor Latino)	4
Central America Airplay (Monitor Latino)	2
Chile Airplay (Monitor Latino)	8
Colombia (Billboard)	13
Colombia Airplay (Monitor Latino)	12
Costa Rica Airplay (Monitor Latino)	6
Croatia (HRT)	85
Ecuador (Billboard)	19
Ecuador Airplay (Monitor Latino)	2
El Salvador Airplay (Monitor Latino)	6
Global 200 (Billboard)	55
Guatemala Airplay (Monitor Latino)	4
Honduras Airplay (Monitor Latino)	4
Latin America Airplay (Monitor Latino)	1
Lithuania Airplay (TopHit)	63
Mexico Airplay (Monitor Latino)	2
Netherlands (Single Tip)	11
Nicaragua Airplay (Monitor Latino)	1
Panama Airplay (Monitor Latino)	2
Panama (PRODUCE)	6
Paraguay Airplay (Monitor Latino)	6
Peru (Billboard)	20
Puerto Rico Airplay (Monitor Latino)	14
Spain (Promusicae)	16
Switzerland (Schweizer Hitparade)	100
Uruguay Airplay (Monitor Latino)	6
US Hot Latin Songs (Billboard)	31
US Latin Airplay (Billboard)	1
US Latin Pop Airplay (Billboard)	1
Venezuela Airplay (Monitor Latino)	15
Venezuela Airplay (Record Report)	33

=== Monthly charts ===
Chart (2023)	Peak position
Paraguay (SPG)	36

=== Year-end charts ===
Year-end chart performance for "Copa Vacía"
Chart (2023)	Position
Argentina Airplay (Monitor Latino)	19
Bolivia Airplay (Monitor Latino)	45
Chile Airplay (Monitor Latino)	46
Costa Rica Airplay (Monitor Latino)	44
Ecuador Airplay (Monitor Latino)	36
El Salvador Airplay (Monitor Latino)	42
Guatemala Airplay (Monitor Latino)	50
Honduras Airplay (Monitor Latino)	54
Nicaragua Airplay (Monitor Latino)	44
Panama Airplay (Monitor Latino)	33
Paraguay Airplay (Monitor Latino)	67
Puerto Rico Airplay (Monitor Latino)	26
US Hot Latin Songs (Billboard)	97
US Latin Pop Airplay (Billboard)	6
US Latin Airplay (Billboard)	31
US Latin Rhythm Airplay (Billboard)	15
Venezuela Airplay (Monitor Latino)	64

== Certifications ==
Certifications for "Copa Vacía"
Region	Certification	Certified units/sales
Brazil (Pro-Música Brasil)	Gold	20,000^{‡}
Colombia	Platinum+2× Gold	
Mexico (AMPROFON)	Platinum+Gold	210,000^{‡}
Spain (Promusicae)	2× Platinum	120,000^{‡}
United States (RIAA)	5× Platinum (Latin)	300,000^{‡}
^{‡} Sales+streaming figures based on certification alone.
