= Cómo Dónde y Cuándo =

2024 song by Shakira

Song by Shakira

from the album Las Mujeres Ya No Lloran
- Released: March 22, 2024
- Genre: Rock en español
- Length: 2:59
- Label: Sony Music Latin
- Songwriters: Albert Hype; Shakira; Servando Primera; Rafa Rodríguez; Daniel Rondón
- Producers: Albert Hype; Shakira

Audio video
- "Cómo Dónde y Cuándo" on YouTube

"Cómo Dónde y Cuándo" (English: "How Where and When") is a song by Colombian singer-songwriter Shakira. The song was released on 22 March 2024 as a track on Shakira's twelfth studio album, Las Mujeres Ya No Lloran. The song marks a return to the Latin rock genre she saw success with early in her career in the '90s.

== Background ==
On 29 February 2024, Shakira unveiled the tracklist of her twelfth studio album Las Mujeres Ya No Lloran, her first album in seven years. The album's sixth track is titled "Cómo Dónde y Cuándo", and she described the writing process of it and the other songs as "rebuilding herself": "As I sang them, my tears were transformed into diamonds and my vulnerability into resilience".

On 8 March, Shakira shared a preview of the song on social media. According to her, the song discusses how emotions are impacted by life events. She also stated that the song is one of the most rock-oriented on the album, and described the lyrical content as "realistic, but also optimistic", and emphasized that quoting the lyrics of the song: "entre la rutina y el estrés, la vida es una per..." (English: "between routine and stress, life is a b..."). Her fans noted that the preview snippet of the song sounds like her early 2000's musical output.

During an interview with the Venezuelan program Tu Mañana, Venezuelan singer Servando Primera discussed the origins of the song. Initially expecting to create a song with urban or reguetón sounds, he was surprised when Shakira decided to change direction and work on a different genre in the studio.

== Composition ==
"Cómo Dónde y Cuándo" is a pop rock ballad written by Shakira, Albert Hype, Servando Primera, Rafa Rodríguez and Daniel Rondón. It explores themes of love and hopefulness with lyrics about being surrounded by your friends and family, emphasizing moving on from the past, embracing the present, and looking to the future with optimism. In an interview for RCN Radio's La Mega, Shakira was asked which of her songs would be perfect for overcoming heartbreak and she chose "Cómo Dónde y Cuándo". Produced by Shakira and Albert Hype, the song is instrumentally led with guitar and drums.

== Live performances ==
Shakira debuted "Cómo Dónde y Cuándo" live playing bass at a free concert in Times Square, New York City on 26 March 2024. Noticias Caracol described how Shakira "shone like a rockstar" in front of a record-breaking audience of 40,000 people. Before performing the song, she introduced it proclaiming that "Cómo Dónde y Cuándo" is "one of [her] favorites from the new album", proceeding to comment that "it's an optimistic song that reminds us that the past is [useless] and only the future is what is remembered".

== Reception ==
Overall, "Cómo Dónde y Cuándo" was well received by critics. The song received praise for showcasing Shakira at her best and for acting as a return to her rock roots and being an homage to her '90s music.

Pablo Gil from El Mundo took note on the song sounding 'old' and called it a nod to the fans of Shakira's older music. Billboard's writers ranked the song as the sixth best on the album, noticing how Shakira going "back to basics" with the song, and calling it a homage to her own '90s music while inscribing Shakira's vocals on the song as 'powerful', and praised the song as a "stellar return to her rock roots". Suzy Exposito from Rolling Stone described the song a "free-spirited guitar ballad" reminiscent of the "moody rockera" Shakira of the '90s, while portraying her tone as angsty and comparing the song to her single "Inevitable". Thania Garcia from Variety narrated how Shakira "returns to the framework of guitars and drums she was best known for during her rockstar era", comparing the song to her singles "Pies Descalzos, Sueños Blancos" and "Dónde Están Los Ladrones?". María Porcel from El País reflected how the song is "the one that most reminds us of the old and long-awaited Shakira".

Fernanda Pérez Sánchez from Vogue México y Latinoamérica outlined how "Cómo Dónde y Cuándo" is "the most hopeful song" on the album, dubbing it as a "spiritual heir" to Shakira's 2011 single "Sale el Sol", all while feeling that not enough people were giving "Cómo Dónde y Cuándo" the recognition it deserved. Pablito Wilson from Las2orillas delineated the song as "straight pop rock song without many embellishments" that sounds like it's from her breakout albums Pies Descalzos or Dónde Están Los Ladrones?, but "with the quality that is now used for radio hits". Radio Uno Bogotá 88.9 FM depicted how the song's "profound lyrics show the life philosophy of the singer, who has experienced ups and downs in her career and personal life", summarizing the track as "a melody that reflects the complexity of life and the ability to be reborn from the ashes".

On 12 June 2024, Rolling Stone included "Cómo Dónde y Cuándo" on their list "the best songs of 2024 so far", encapsulating the song as "an exquisite pop-rock moment", and hailing "Shakira channeling her Nineties rock-era energy" "[tapping] into the angsty soundscapes of her classic 1998 album". The magazine also featured the song on their list of great songs of 2024 by Spanish-speaking artists so far on 23 June 2024.

== Credits ==
Personnel

- Shakira – writer, producer
- Albert Hype – writer, producer
- Servando Primera - writer
- Rafa Rodríguez - writer
- Daniel Rondón - writer
- Dave Clauss - recording engineer, mixing engineer, immersive mixing engineer
- Dani Val - recording engineer
- Roger Rodés - recording engineer
- Adam Ayan - mastering engineer

== Certifications ==
Certifications for "Cómo Dónde y Cuándo"
Region	Certification	Certified units/sales
United States (RIAA)	Gold (Latin)	30,000^{‡}
^{‡} Sales+streaming figures based on certification alone.
