= TQG =

2023 single by Karol G and Shakira

Single by Karol G and Shakira

from the album Mañana Será Bonito
- Language: Spanish
- Released: February 24, 2023
- Recorded: 2022
- Studio: The Mastering Palace (New York, NY)
- Genre: Reggaeton
- Length: 3:17
- Label: Universal Latino
- Songwriters: Carolina Giraldo; Shakira Mebarak; Daniel Echavarría; Kevyn Cruz
- Producer: Ovy on the Drums

Karol G singles chronology
"X Si Volvemos" (2023)	"TQG" (2023)	"Mientras Me Curo del Cora" (2023)

Shakira singles chronology
"Shakira: Bzrp Music Sessions, Vol. 53" (2023)	"TQG" (2023)	"Acróstico" (2023)

Music video
- "TQG" on YouTube

"TQG" (acronym for Te Quedó Grande; transl. "Too Big for You") is a song by Colombian singer-songwriters Karol G and Shakira. Written alongside Keityn and Ovy on the Drums, and produced by the latter, the song was released on February 24, 2023, through Universal Music Latino, as the fifth single from Karol G’s fourth studio album, Mañana Será Bonito. The song is also featured on Shakira’s twelfth studio album, Las Mujeres Ya No Lloran (2024).

== Background ==
On February 10, 2023, Giraldo revealed the cover art for Mañana Será Bonito and revealed the track list, where "TQG" was featured as a solo song. Later on February 14, 2023, Shakira wished Karol G a "happy birthday" message through social media, adding more speculation to a collaboration, as it was something the singer did to Argentine producer Bizarrap, whom she would collaborate on the song "Shakira: Bzrp Music Sessions, Vol. 53. That same day, Karol G would reveal in an interview with The New York Times that Colombian singer Shakira was featured on the song. The song was released as the fifth single alongside the album's release on February 24, 2023.

== Composition ==
"TQG"
A 19-second audio sample of the song's chorus

"TQG" is an acronym for the phrase "Te Quedó Grande"; is a reggaeton track, but it's also considered as a diss. The song's lyrics features "shots" directed at their ex-boyfriends, Puerto Rican artist Anuel AA and Spanish footballer Gerard Pique. The song also presents lyrics sung by Shakira about Pique's current girlfriend, Clara Chia.

In an interview with Rolling Stone, Karol G would reveal that she wrote the song in 2022 during an emotionally complex time. She explained that although she had intended to ask Shakira to collaborate, it wasn't intended to happen with "TQG". After listening to Shakira's "Monotonía", collaboration with Ozuna, she decided to send her the song. She added: "listening to that story and where she was at, [TQG] made a lot of sense. I sent it to her and she loved it."

In a later interview with Billboard, Giraldo revealed that the song was written with Ovy on the Drums and Keityn Cruz in a recording session for "Mamiii", collaboration with American singer Becky G. She explained how the song came to be and what it means to her:

We were trying to figure out what we were going to do, because I had said "yes" to Becky, and now we had two songs, but the topic was the same: heartbreak diss tracks. Then when I saw the story about Shakira and her situation, this song again gained meaning. I really want songs to have a meaning and connect with real stories. I would love for people to simply listen to this song, as a song. Obviously as artists, we write songs based on personal situations we've lived, but at the end of the day, those songs aren't aimed at anyone in particular, or are meant to hurt anyone. I'd love for my music to be divorced from a ton of situations and that people could enjoy them for what they are: songs that tell stories so people can identify with those stories.

— Karol G on "TQG"

== Critical reception ==
Alexis Petridis of The Guardian commended the ethereal atmosphere that "TQG" has "though frankly it's a bit phoned-in." Ernesto Lechner from Rolling Stone criticized the song calling it "underwhelming", stating "her much-anticipated track with Colombian icon Shakira, "TQG," feels underwhelming, especially since it arrives only weeks after the media circus that surrounded Shakira's massive new track with Bizarrap."

Select year end TQG
Publication	List	Rank	Ref.
Rolling Stone	The 100 Best Songs of 2023	28	
Remezcla	Best Pop Songs of 2023	1	

== Commercial performance ==
"TQG" debuted at number 7 on the US Billboard Hot 100 chart dated March 11, 2023, becoming Karol G's first and Shakira's sixth top-ten entry on the chart. The song charted twenty weeks on the chart, with the first seven staying within the top 40.

On the US Billboard Hot Latin Songs chart, the song debuted at number one, becoming Karol's sixth and Shakira's thirteenth number one on the chart.

On the Billboard Global 200, the song also debuted at the top spot with 158.4 million streams and 10,000 sales for the week dated March 11, 2023, becoming both Karol G's and Shakira's first number one on that chart.

According to the International Federation of the Phonographic Industry (IFPI), it was the fifteenth best-selling global single of 2023, earning 1.18 billion subscription streams equivalents globally, becoming Shakira's first IFPI year-end single entry and Karol's second following 2022's "Provenza".

== Awards and nominations ==
Award and nominations for "TQG"
Year	Ceremony	Award	Result	Ref.
2023	Billboard Music Awards	Top Latin Song	Nominated	
2023	Billboard Latin Music Awards	Hot Latin Song of the Year	Nominated	
2023	Billboard Latin Music Awards	Hot Latin Song of the Year, Vocal Event	Nominated	
2023	Billboard Latin Music Awards	Sales Song of the Year	Nominated	
2023	Billboard Latin Music Awards	Airplay Song of the Year	Nominated	
2023	Billboard Latin Music Awards	Latin Pop Song of the Year	Nominated	
2023	BreakTudo Awards	Latin Hit	Won	
2023	Guinness World Records	Highest-charting Spanish-language track on the Billboard Hot 100 (female)	Won	
2023	Heat Latin Music Awards	Best Collaboration	Nominated	
2023	Latin Grammy Awards	Song Of The Year	Nominated	
2023	Latin Grammy Awards	Best Urban Fusion/Performance	Won	
2023	Latin Grammy Awards	Best Urban Song	Nominated	
2023	Latino Music Awards	Song of the Year	Won	
2023	Latino Music Awards	Best Urban Song	Nominated	
2023	Latino Music Awards	Viral Song	Won	
2023	Latino Music Awards	Best Urban Music Video	Won	
2023	Los 40 Music Awards	Best Video	Nominated	
2023	Los 40 Music Awards	Best Urban Collaboration	Nominated	
2023	MTV Millennial Awards	Global Hit of the Year	Won	
2023	MTV Europe Music Awards	Best Collaboration	Won	
2023	MTV Video Music Awards	Best Collaboration	Won	
2023	MTV Video Music Awards	Best Latin	Nominated	
2023	NRJ Music Awards	International Collaboration of the Year	Nominated	
2023	Premios Juventud	Girl Power Track	Won	
2023	Premios Juventud	Best Urban Track	Won	
2023	Premios Juventud	Best Pop/Urban Collaboration	Won	
2023	Premios Juventud	Social Dance Challenge	Won	
2023	Premios Musa	International Latin Song of the Year	Won	
2023	Premios Musa	International Collaboration of the Year	Won	
2023	Premios Tu Música Urbano	Collaboration of the Year	Nominated	
2023	WME Awards	Latin American Song	Nominated	
2024	BMI Latin Awards	Award Winning Song	Won	
2024	Latin American Music Awards	Song of the Year	Won	
2024	Latin American Music Awards	Favorite Urban Song	Nominated	
2024	Latino Music Awards	Song of the Year	Nominated	
2024	Latino Music Awards	Best Urban Song	Won	
2024	Latino Music Awards	Best Urban Music Video	Won	
2024	Latino Music Awards	Best Viral Song of TikTok	Nominated	
2024	Latino Music Awards	Video of the Year	Nominated	
2024	Lo Nuestro Awards	Urban/Pop Song of the Year	Won	
2024	Premios Nuestra Tierra	Best Urban Song	Nominated	
2024	Premios Nuestra Tierra	Best Urban Collaboration	Won	
2024	Premios Nuestra Tierra	Best Music Video	Won	
2024	Spotify Plaques	One Billion Streams Award	Won	

== Music video ==
The music video for "TQG" was directed by Pedro Artola and was released on Karol G's YouTube channel on February 24, 2023. The concept of the visual is heavily inspired by the plot of the film The Truman Show (1998).

== Live performances ==
On March 10, 2023, Karol G performed "TQG" for the first time in Puerto Rico for a three-day stadium show promoting the release of Mañana Será Bonito. On July 10, 2023, Karol G performed "TQG" for the Today morning show. The song was performed once again by Giraldo on August 4, 2024, for the Lollapalooza music festival. From August 10, 2023, to July 23, 2024, Karol G embarked on the arena-stadium Mañana Será Bonito Tour, where the song was present throughout the set list as the show's opener. On September 12, 2023, during the MTV Video Music Awards, Shakira performed the song as part of her medley, as she received the Michael Jackson Video Vanguard Award. On February 11, 2025, Shakira embarked on the Las Mujeres Ya No Lloran World Tour, set to last through November 28, 2026, where a shortened version of "TQG" is present on the set list.

== Charts ==
=== Weekly charts ===
Chart performance for "TQG"
Chart (2023)	Peak position
Argentina Hot 100 (Billboard)	2
Argentina (Monitor Latino)	1
Bolivia (Billboard)	1
Bolivia (Monitor Latino)	2
Brazil Latin Airplay (Crowley Charts)	2
Canada Hot 100 (Billboard)	33
Central America (Monitor Latino)	1
Chile (Billboard)	1
Chile (Monitor Latino)	1
Colombia (Billboard)	1
Colombia (Monitor Latino)	1
Costa Rica (Monitor Latino)	1
Croatia (Billboard)	25
Dominican Republic (Monitor Latino)	1
Ecuador (Billboard)	1
Ecuador (Monitor Latino)	1
El Salvador (Monitor Latino)	1
Finland Airplay (Radiosoittolista)	41
France (SNEP)	30
Germany (TopHit)	42
Global 200 (Billboard)	1
Greece International (IFPI)	46
Guatemala (Monitor Latino)	2
Honduras (Monitor Latino)	1
Hungary (Single Top 40)	13
Ireland (IRMA)	40
Italy (FIMI)	44
Latin America (Monitor Latino)	1
Lithuania (TopHit)	145
Luxembourg (Billboard)	11
Mexico (Billboard)	1
Moldova Airplay (TopHit)	128
Netherlands (Single Tip)	1
New Zealand Hot Singles (RMNZ)	24
Nicaragua (Monitor Latino)	1
Panama (Monitor Latino)	2
Panama (PRODUCE)	1
Paraguay (Monitor Latino)	1
Peru (Billboard)	1
Peru (Monitor Latino)	1
Portugal (AFP)	12
Puerto Rico (Monitor Latino)	1
Romania Airplay (Media Forest)	1
Romania TV Airplay (Media Forest)	2
San Marino (SMRRTV Top 50)	22
Spain (PROMUSICAE)	1
Suriname (Nationale Top 40)	30
Sweden Heatseeker (Sverigetopplistan)	19
Switzerland (Schweizer Hitparade)	5
Turkey (Radiomonitor Türkiye)	8
UK Singles (Official Charts)	88
Uruguay (Monitor Latino)	1
US Billboard Hot 100	7
US Hot Latin Songs (Billboard)	1
US Latin Airplay (Billboard)	1
US Latin Rhythm Airplay (Billboard)	1
US Rhythmic Airplay (Billboard)	24
Venezuela (Monitor Latino)	8

=== Year-end charts ===
2023 year-end chart performance for "TQG"
Chart (2023)	Position
Argentina Airplay (Monitor Latino)	27
Bolivia Airplay (Monitor Latino)	4
Chile Airplay (Monitor Latino)	4
Colombia Airplay (Monitor Latino)	8
Costa Rica Airplay (Monitor Latino)	14
Dominican Republic Airplay (Monitor Latino)	7
Ecuador Airplay (Monitor Latino)	6
El Salvador Airplay (ASAP EGC)	5
France (SNEP)	92
Global 200 (Billboard)	18
Global Singles (IFPI)	15
Guatemala Airplay (Monitor Latino)	5
Honduras Airplay (Monitor Latino)	4
Mexico Airplay (Monitor Latino)	26
Nicaragua Airplay (Monitor Latino)	5
Panama Airplay (Monitor Latino)	6
Paraguay Airplay (Monitor Latino)	7
Peru Airplay (Monitor Latino)	5
Puerto Rico Airplay (Monitor Latino)	11
Romania Airplay (TopHit)	16
Spain (PROMUSICAE)	6
Switzerland (Schweizer Hitparade)	73
Uruguay Streaming (CUD)	18
US Billboard Hot 100	65
US Hot Latin Songs (Billboard)	4
US Latin Airplay (Billboard)	1
US Latin Pop Airplay (Billboard)	2
US Latin Rhythm Airplay (Billboard)	1
US (TopHit)	42
Venezuela Airplay (Monitor Latino)	32

2024 year-end chart performance for "TQG"
Chart (2024)	Position
Romania Airplay (TopHit)	153

2025 year-end chart performance for "TQG"
Chart (2025)	Position
Romania Airplay (TopHit)	128

== Certifications ==
Certifications for "TQG"
Region	Certification	Certified units/sales
Brazil (Pro-Música Brasil)	Diamond	160,000^{‡}
Canada (Music Canada)	2× Platinum	160,000^{‡}
France (SNEP)	Diamond	333,333^{‡}
Italy (FIMI)	Platinum	100,000^{‡}
Poland (ZPAV)	Gold	25,000^{‡}
Portugal (AFP)	Platinum	10,000^{‡}
Spain (Promusicae)	9× Platinum	540,000^{‡}
Switzerland (IFPI Switzerland)	Gold	10,000^{‡}
Streaming
Worldwide	—	1,180,000,000
^{‡} Sales+streaming figures based on certification alone.

== Release history ==
Release history and formats for "TQG"
Region	Date	Format(s)	Label	Ref.
Various	February 24, 2023	Digital download; streaming	Universal Latino	
Italy	March 3, 2023	Radio airplay	Universal Latino	
United States	March 28, 2023	Rhythmic radio	Universal Latino	

== See also ==
- List of Billboard Argentina Hot 100 top-ten singles in 2023
- List of Billboard Global 200 number ones of 2023
- List of Billboard Hot 100 top-ten singles in 2023
- List of Billboard Global 200 top 10 singles of 2023
- List of Billboard Hot Latin Songs and Latin Airplay number ones of 2023
- List of number-one singles of 2023 (Spain)
- List of best-selling Latin singles
- List of best-selling singles in Spain
- Billboard Year-End Hot 100 singles of 2023
