= Acróstico =

2023 single by Shakira

Single by Shakira

from the album Las Mujeres Ya No Lloran
- Language: Spanish
- English title: "Acrostic"
- Released: 11 May 2023
- Recorded: March 2023
- Genre: Pop, Latin pop
- Length: 2:50
- Label: Sony Latin
- Songwriters: Shakira; Keityn; Luis Fernando Ochoa; L.E.X.U.Z
- Producers: Shakira; L.E.X.U.Z

Shakira singles chronology
"TQG" (2023)	"Acróstico" (2023)	"Copa Vacía" (2023)

Music video
- "Acróstico" on YouTube

Lyric video
- "Acróstico (Solo)" on YouTube

"Acróstico" (also known as "Acróstico - Milan + Sasha") (lit. 'Acrostic', Spanish: [aˈkɾos.t̪i.ko]) is a song by Colombian singer-songwriter Shakira. The song was released on 11 May 2023, through Sony Music Latin as the third single from Shakira's twelfth studio album, Las Mujeres Ya No Lloran (2024). The song features uncredited vocals from Shakira's children Milan and Sasha.

At the 24th Annual Latin Grammy Awards the record was nominated for Song of the Year, alongside other two song, "Shakira: Bzrp Music Sessions, Vol. 53" and "TQG", making Shakira the first artist to achieve three nominations in the category at the same ceremony.

== Background and release ==
Rumors began circulating about Shakira's next single being a collaboration with Manuel Turizo titled "Copa Vacía" but plans were scrapped in favor of releasing "Acróstico". On 10 May 2023, just one day before the song's release, Shakira announced "Acróstico" on all of her social media platforms.

== Composition ==
"Acróstico" was co-written by Shakira, Keityn, Luis Fernando Ochoa and L.E.X.U.Z. Colombian songwriter Keityn, who had previously co-written "Te Felicito" and "Monotonía" for Shakira's album, stated in an interview that the inspiration behind the song was the acrostics that her mother used to compose for him when he was a child. The song thus contains an acrostic of Shakira's child's name "Milan" in the first letters of lines in the first verse, and a similar structure for her other child "Sasha" in the second. The song features vocals from both children.

Thematically, the song reflects "on a lost love", referable to the divorce between Shakira and Gerard Piqué. The singer explained in an Instagram story the meaning of working with her children during the negotiation period for the divorce of their parents:

"This year Milan has written songs that have made me tear up, and Sasha has dedicated hours playing the piano and discovering his voice. Both have spent some time with me in the studio, and upon hearing this song, they’ve asked to be part of it. They’ve felt it and interpreted it in their own way and for themselves, with the same passion and emotion of a person who carries music within them. Milan and Sasha, it’s so beautiful to see how you open your wings to make your dreams come true. There’s nothing else that makes me feel more fulfilled than being your mom."

== Critical reception ==
Los Angeles Times's writer Tommy Calle found that the lyrics "show hope, maternal love, unconditional support and overcoming pain, so you can find more words that appear in the song". Camila Osorio of El País compared "Acróstico" to "TQG" and previous Shakira's songs, writing that the singer does not evoke "anger, revenge, or heartbreak" but she is inspired by "a love letter to her two children" of apology for the sad and troubled time they experienced during the finalization of the divorce.

== Accolades ==
Awards and nominations for "Acróstico"
Year	Organization	Category	Result	Ref.
2023	MTV Video Music Awards	Best Latin	Nominated	
2023	Latin Grammy Awards	Song of the Year	Nominated	
2023	Latino Music Awards	Best Pop Song	Won	

== Music video ==
The official music video was released four days after the song's release on 15 May 2023. It was co-directed by Shakira and Jaume De Laiguana. Its cinematography was handled by Rafa Lluch. It features Shakira playing the piano with her two children Milan and Sasha. Both of her children contributed vocals to the music video version of the song.

== Live performances ==
On November 3, 2023, Shakira performed the song for the first time at the 2023 Los 40 Music Awards via a live transmission from Miami accompanied by a piano. On November 16, Shakira performed the song live at the 24th Annual Latin Grammy Awards. The performance included her sons Milan and Sasha's voices and video on the screen.

On December 9, 2025, during the Las Mujeres Ya No Lloran World Tour concert in Buenos Aires, Shakira was joined by Milan and Sasha for a surprise and live debut performance together.

== Charts ==
=== Weekly charts ===
Chart performance for "Acróstico"
Chart (2023)	Peak position
Argentina Hot 100 (Billboard)	11
Argentina (Monitor Latino)	10
Bolivia (Billboard)	8
Bolivia (Monitor Latino)	5
Central America (Monitor Latino)	7
Chile (Billboard)	13
Colombia (Billboard)	1
Costa Rica (Monitor Latino)	14
Ecuador (Billboard)	5
Ecuador (Monitor Latino)	15
El Salvador (Monitor Latino)	8
Global 200 (Billboard)	12
Guatemala (Monitor Latino)	7
Latin America (Monitor Latino)	5
Mexico (Billboard)	15
Panama (Monitor Latino)	7
Perú (Billboard)	6
Perú (Monitor Latino)	6
Portugal (AFP)	105
Spain (PROMUSICAE)	1
Switzerland (Schweizer Hitparade)	41
Uruguay (Monitor Latino)	10
US Billboard Hot 100	84
US Latin Airplay (Billboard)	11
US Latin Pop Airplay (Billboard)	2
US Hot Latin Songs (Billboard)	16

=== Year-end charts ===
Year-end chart performance for "Acróstico"
Chart (2023)	Position
Costa Rica (Monitor Latino)	31
Ecuador (Monitor Latino)	64
Spain (PROMUSICAE)	39
Panama (Monitor Latino)	48
Peru (Monitor Latino)	76
Puerto Rico (Monitor Latino)	5
US Hot Latin Songs (Billboard)	89
US Latin Pop Airplay (Billboard)	7
US Latin Airplay (Billboard)	38

=== Monthly charts ===
Chart (2023)	Peak position
Paraguay (SPG)	98

== Certifications ==
Certifications for "Acróstico"
Region	Certification	Certified units/sales
Brazil (Pro-Música Brasil)	Gold	20,000^{‡}
Colombia	Diamond+2× Platinum+4× Gold	
Mexico (AMPROFON)	3× Platinum	420,000^{‡}
Spain (Promusicae)	3× Platinum	180,000^{‡}
United States (RIAA)	4× Platinum (Latin)	240,000^{‡}
^{‡} Sales+streaming figures based on certification alone.

== See also ==
- List of number-one singles of 2023 (Spain)
- List of best-selling singles in Spain
