= Puntería =

Single by Shakira and Cardi B

from the album Las Mujeres Ya No Lloran
- Language: Spanish; English
- English title: "Aim"
- Released: 22 March 2024
- Genre: Electropop
- Length: 3:01
- Label: Sony Latin
- Songwriters: David Stewart; Shakira; Belcalis Almanzar; Carolina Isabel Colón Juarbe; Daniela Blau
- Producers: David Stewart; Shakira

Shakira singles chronology
| "El Jefe" (2023) | "Puntería" (2024) | "(Entre Paréntesis)" (2024) |

Cardi B singles chronology
| "Enough (Miami)" (2024) | "Puntería" (2024) | "Wanna Be" (Remix) (2024) |

Music video
- "Puntería" on YouTube

"Puntería" (English: "Aim") is a song by Colombian singer-songwriter Shakira and American rapper Cardi B. It was released on 22 March 2024 through Sony Music Latin as the sixth single from Shakira's twelfth studio album, Las Mujeres Ya No Lloran (2024). It served as the first focus track of the album. "Puntería" was named the official song of TelevisaUnivision's 2024 Copa América CONMEBOL coverage.

== Background and release ==
On 15 February 2024, Shakira announced her twelfth studio album, Las Mujeres Ya No Lloran, and made it available for preorder. On 29 February, she revealed the album's track list, including a collaboration with Cardi B entitled "Puntería". Shakira shared a sneak peek of the song and its music video on her official WhatsApp channel on 16 March. The song was released on 22 March as the opening track of the album. Vinyl & CD pressings of the album include a different version of the track in which Cardi B sings and raps in only Spanish, as opposed to both Spanish and English in the original version. The "vinyl version" was included on digital versions of the album as the closing track.

== Recording and development ==
Shakira and Cardi B first met during Paris Fashion Week, at which Cardi expressed her admiration for the singer and revealed that her sister won a talent show performing one of Shakira’s songs when they were growing up. According to Shakira, she has always wanted to work with Cardi B, and the opportunity finally arose for "Punteria". When developing the song, Shakira expressed that she thought "How cool would it be to have a woman rapper here?". The only artist that came to her mind was Cardi B, who she had recently met in Paris. Shakira stated, "We were always discussing internally if it was a good idea to put someone on this song. I always pictured Cardi on this song. I reached out, and here we are." She contacted Cardi B, who immediately agreed to be on the song and do anything required for it, having always wanted to do a song with Shakira as well.

== Critical reception ==
USA Today named "Puntería" the "standout" track of the album and complimented Shakira's "liquid delivery" and Cardi B's "trademark spicy rapping", finding them to be a "potent duo". Billboard called it the fifth-best song on the album and praised the "infectious energy and the undeniable chemistry" between the two artists. They felt that listeners would appreciate Shakira's "effortless flow" as well as Cardi B's "unmistakable bad-girl swagger," which they felt elevated the song. Suzy Exposito from Rolling Stone depicted how Shakira "gets straight to the point with the nu-disco radio candy" while "[serenading] a dastardly Cupid in Spanish". Pablo Gil from El Mundo described the song as a "dancey and easy to consume" "erotic festive duet" "about making a match without nonsense", noting the song's "mischievous verses". Thania Garcia from Variety inscribed it as "nu-disco-pop song", taking note on Cardi's "playful rap verses" and outlining how "Shakira's voice is at its most syrupy" in the song. María Porcel from El País reflected on "Puntería" being "a summery, poppy song, where [Shakira] borders on the most risqué lyrics of, probably, her entire career".

== Music video ==
The music video for "Puntería" was directed by Hannah Lux Davis and was released on Shakira's official YouTube channel along with the single on 22 March 2024. It features actor Lucien Laviscount.

== Charts ==
=== Weekly charts ===
Weekly chart performance for "Puntería"
| Chart (2024) | Peak position |
|---|---|
| Argentina Hot 100 (Billboard) | 61 |
| Argentina Airplay (Monitor Latino) | 1 |
| Belarus (TopHit) | 59 |
| Belarus Airplay (TopHit) | 53 |
| Belgium (Ultratop 50 Wallonia) | 47 |
| Bolivia Airplay (Monitor Latino) | 7 |
| Brazil Airplay (Crowley Charts) | 65 |
| Brazil International (Crowley Charts) | 2 |
| Brazil (Crowley Charts) | 1 |
| Central America Airplay (Monitor Latino) | 5 |
| Central America + Caribbean (FONOTICA) | 3 |
| Chile Airplay (Monitor Latino) | 4 |
| CIS Airplay (TopHit) | 43 |
| Colombia (Billboard) | 14 |
| Colombia Airplay (Monitor Latino) | 5 |
| Costa Rica Airplay (Monitor Latino) | 11 |
| Czech Republic Airplay (ČNS IFPI) | 15 |
| Dominican Republic Airplay (Monitor Latino) | 12 |
| Ecuador Airplay (Monitor Latino) | 3 |
| El Salvador Airplay (Monitor Latino) | 2 |
| Estonia (TopHit) | 130 |
| Estonia Airplay (TopHit) | 51 |
| Global 200 (Billboard) | 69 |
| Guatemala Airplay (Monitor Latino) | 6 |
| Honduras Airplay (Monitor Latino) | 8 |
| Italy Airplay (EarOne) | 1 |
| Japan Hot Overseas (Billboard Japan) | 16 |
| Kazakhstan (TopHit) | 157 |
| Kazakhstan Airplay (TopHit) | 93 |
| Latin America Airplay (Monitor Latino) | 2 |
| Lithuania (TopHit) | 70 |
| Lithuania Airplay (TopHit) | 11 |
| Mexico Airplay (Monitor Latino) | 19 |
| New Zealand Hot Singles (RMNZ) | 34 |
| Nicaragua (Monitor Latino) | 11 |
| Panama Airplay (Monitor Latino) | 2 |
| Panama (PRODUCE) | 6 |
| Paraguay Airplay (Monitor Latino) | 13 |
| Peru Airplay (Monitor Latino) | 5 |
| Poland (Polish Airplay Top 100) | 5 |
| Puerto Rico Airplay (Monitor Latino) | 2 |
| Romania (TopHit) | 34 |
| Romania (RRA) | 1 |
| Russia (TopHit) | 66 |
| Russia Airplay (TopHit) | 42 |
| San Marino (SMRRTV Top 50) | 2 |
| Spain (PROMUSICAE) | 37 |
| Spain Airplay (TopHit) | 7 |
| Switzerland (Schweizer Hitparade) | 62 |
| UK Singles Downloads (Official Charts) | 76 |
| UK Singles Sales (OCC) | 81 |
| Uruguay Airplay (Monitor Latino) | 13 |
| US Billboard Hot 100 | 72 |
| US Hot Latin Songs (Billboard) | 3 |
| US Latin Airplay (Billboard) | 1 |
| US Latin Pop Airplay (Billboard) | 1 |
| US Rhythmic Airplay (Billboard) | 22 |
| Venezuela Airplay (Monitor Latino) | 13 |
| Venezuela (Record Report) | 15 |

=== Monthly charts ===
Monthly chart performance for "Puntería"
| Chart (2024) | Peak position |
|---|---|
| Poland (TopHit) | 98 |
| Poland Airplay (TopHit) | 5 |
| Romania Airplay (TopHit) | 30 |

=== Year-end charts ===
2024 year-end chart performance for "Puntería"
| Chart (2024) | Peak position |
|---|---|
| Lithuania Airplay (TopHit) | 70 |
| Poland Airplay (TopHit) | 96 |
| Romania Airplay (TopHit) | 129 |
| Spain Airplay (TopHit) | 50 |
| Taiwan (KKBOX) | 52 |

== Certifications ==
Certifications for "Puntería"
| Region | Certification | Certified units/sales |
|---|---|---|
| Brazil (Pro-Música Brasil) | Gold | 20,000^{‡} |
| Colombia | Gold | |
| Mexico (AMPROFON) | Gold | 70,000^{‡} |
| Spain (Promusicae) | Gold | 30,000^{‡} |
| United States (RIAA) | 3× Platinum (Latin) | 180,000^{‡} |
^{‡} Sales+streaming figures based on certification alone.

== Release history ==
Release dates and format(s) for "Puntería"
| Region | Date | Format(s) | Label | Ref. |
|---|---|---|---|---|
| United States | 22 March 2024 | Digital download; streaming | Sony Latin | |
| Italy | 29 March 2024 | Radio airplay | Sony Italy | |
