= Las Mujeres Ya No Lloran =

Studio album by Shakira
- Released: 22 March 2024
- Recorded: 2021–2023
- Genres: Pop; rock; Afrobeats; EDM; electropop; bachata; regional Mexican; cumbia
- Length: 51:13
- Language: Spanish
- Label: Sony Latin
- Producers: Shakira; Albert Hype; Bizarrap; Ciey; DallasK; Edgar Barrera; Ily Wonder; L.E.X.U.Z; Keityn; Tainy; Yeti Beats; Ovy on the Drums

Shakira chronology
Shakira in Concert: El Dorado World Tour (2019)	Las Mujeres Ya No Lloran (2024)	Anniversary: Oral Fixation (20th) and Pies Descalzos (30th) Live (2025)

Singles from Las Mujeres Ya No Lloran
- 1. "Te Felicito" Released: 21 April 2022; 2. "Monotonía" Released: 19 October 2022; 3. "Acróstico" Released: 11 May 2023; 4. "Copa Vacía" Released: 29 June 2023; 5. "El Jefe" Released: 20 September 2023; 6. "Puntería" Released: 22 March 2024; 7. "(Entre Paréntesis)" Released: 25 March 2024

Las Mujeres Ya No Lloran (Latin American Spanish: [las muˈxeɾes ʝa no ˈʝoɾan]; transl. Women No Longer Cry) is the twelfth studio album by Colombian singer-songwriter Shakira. It was released on 22 March 2024 through Sony Music Latin. The album marks her first album release in seven years, following El Dorado (2017).

The album was primarily inspired by Shakira's experiences surrounding her breakup from footballer Gerard Piqué and describes her transformation of heartbreak into strength. Primarily a pop record, it employs a diverse range of musical genres, including EDM, rock, reggaeton, bachata, regional Mexican, and Afrobeats. Shakira enlisted vocal collaborations with Cardi B, Rauw Alejandro, Manuel Turizo, Grupo Frontera, Ozuna, Karol G, and Fuerza Regida, as well as her children Milan and Sasha.

Shakira released seven singles from Las Mujeres Ya No Lloran over a two-year period. The lead single, "Te Felicito" with Rauw Alejandro, reached number one in Argentina and the top ten across Latin America, and was certified thirteen times platinum (Latin) in the United States. The album also includes the collaborations "Shakira: Bzrp Music Sessions, Vol. 53" with Bizarrap and "TQG" with Karol G, both of which reached the top ten on the US Billboard Hot 100 and the Billboard Global 200, and topped the Hot Latin Songs chart for five weeks each. To further promote the album, Shakira embarked on the Las Mujeres Ya No Lloran World Tour, commencing February 2025.

Las Mujeres Ya No Lloran was met with positive reviews from music critics, who praised the exploration of music genres and the vulnerability of the lyrics. Upon release, the album debuted at number one in Argentina and Spain. In the United States, it peaked at number one on Billboard Top Latin Albums and number thirteen on the Billboard 200, and was certified seven times platinum (Latin) by the Recording Industry Association of America (RIAA). It won the Grammy Award for Best Latin Pop Album in 2025, becoming Shakira's fourth Grammy win, and received a nomination for the Latin Grammy Award for Album of the Year.

== Background ==
Following the release of her eleventh studio album, El Dorado (2017), and the El Dorado World Tour (2018), Shakira released two collaborations in 2020, "Me Gusta" with Anuel AA and "Girl Like Me" with the Black Eyed Peas, and performed at the Super Bowl LIV halftime show with Jennifer Lopez. During the same period, the singer faced prosecution for tax evasion in Spain and the split from Gerard Piqué, finalized in 2022.

Las Mujeres Ya No Lloran reflects on the transformation she has been going through since the release of her last album. The singer describes the creative process as "alchemical". While she was writing songs she "was rebuilding" herself and singing them turned her tears "into diamonds", and her "vulnerability into strength". The album title is a lyric taken from her song "Shakira: Bzrp Music Sessions, Vol. 53" with Argentine producer Bizarrap from his music sessions series. On 15 February 2024, she took to social media to announce the record and made it available for preorder. The album features 16 tracks, five of which have already been released as singles: "Te Felicito", "Monotonía", "Acróstico", "Copa Vacía", and "El Jefe". In addition to the previously released singles, the album also includes "Shakira: Bzrp Music Sessions, Vol. 53" and the collaboration "TQG" from Karol G's album Mañana Será Bonito.

== Singles ==
"Te Felicito", a collaboration with Puerto Rican singer Rauw Alejandro, was released as the lead single on 21 April 2022. The song peaked at number 11 on the Billboard Global 200 chart and was successful throughout Latin America, where it became Shakira's first number-one single on the Billboard Argentina Hot 100. In the United States, it peaked at number 67 on the Billboard Hot 100 and number 10 on Hot Latin Songs.

"Monotonía", a collaboration with Puerto Rican singer Ozuna, was released as the album's second single on 19 October 2022. The song peaked at number 18 on the Billboard Global 200. In the United States, it peaked at number 65 on the Billboard Hot 100 and number three on Hot Latin Songs.

"Acróstico" was released as the album's third single on 11 May 2023 and features vocals from Shakira's children Milan and Sasha. The song peaked at number 12 on the Billboard Global 200 and topped the charts in Colombia and Spain. In the United States, it peaked at number 84 on the Billboard Hot 100 and number 16 on Hot Latin Songs.

"Copa Vacía", a collaboration with Colombian singer Manuel Turizo, was released as the album's fourth single on 29 June 2023. The song peaked at number 55 on the Billboard Global 200 and entered the top 20 of charts across Latin America. In the United States, it peaked at number 31 on Hot Latin Songs.

"El Jefe", a collaboration with regional Mexican band Fuerza Regida, was released as the album's fifth single on 20 September 2023. The song peaked at number 24 on the Billboard Global 200. In the United States, it peaked at number 55 on the Billboard Hot 100 and number four on Hot Latin Songs.

"Puntería", a collaboration with Dominican-American singer and rapper Cardi B, was released concurrently with the album on 22 March 2024 as the sixth single and served as the first focus track. The song peaked at number 69 on the Billboard Global 200 and entered the top 20 of charts across Latin America. In the United States, it peaked at number 72 on the Billboard Hot 100 and number three on Hot Latin Songs.

"(Entre Paréntesis)", a collaboration with Regional Mexican band Grupo Frontera, was released as the seventh single and second focus track just 3 days after the release of the album, on 25 March 2024. In the United States, it peaked at number 20 on the Billboard Bubbling Under Hot 100 and number 22 on Hot Latin Songs.

The piano ballad "Última" was released as a promotional single on 22 March 2025, one year after the release of the album. The song charted at 9 on US Latin Digital Songs and at 18 on US Latin Pop Airplay, and is certified Latin Platinum in the US.

== Featurings ==
Las Mujeres Ya No Lloran also includes the song "Shakira: Bzrp Music Sessions, Vol. 53", which was released as a part of Argentine producer Bizarrap's Bzrp Music Sessions series via independent label Dale Play. The song saw huge commercial success worldwide and broke four Guinness World Records, including for the most-streamed Latin track on Spotify and YouTube in 24 hours. It peaked at number two on the Billboard Global 200, becoming Shakira's first top-ten single globally since the chart's inception in 2020. It peaked at number nine on the Billboard Hot 100 and topped the Hot Latin Songs chart for five weeks, becoming Shakira's sixth top-ten single in the US and the first Spanish-language single by a female vocalist to enter the top ten in history.

Additionally, the album includes "TQG", a collaboration with Colombian singer Karol G released by Universal Latino as the fifth single from the latter's fourth studio album, Mañana Será Bonito (2023). The song peaked at number one on the Billboard Global 200, becoming both artists' first number-one single. It peaked at number seven on the Billboard Hot 100 and topped the Hot Latin Songs chart for five weeks, becoming Shakira's seventh top-ten single in the US and her second in 2023. With this, Karol G and her broke the Guinness World Record for the highest-charting female Spanish-language track on the Hot 100.

== Promotion ==
On March 26 during the album release week, Shakira performed a pop-up show at Times Square which drew a record-breaking audience of about 40,000 people. She performed "Te Felicito", "TQG", "Shakira: Bzrp Music Sessions, Vol. 53", "Cómo Dónde y Cuándo" and "Puntería" off the album, as well as "Hips Don't Lie", and played a bass while performing.

On 12 April 2024, Shakira joined Bizarrap's set in Coachella, performing their two collaborations "La Fuerte" and "Shakira: Bzrp Music Sessions, Vol. 53", and announcing that her Las Mujeres Ya No Lloran World Tour will start in November 2024. The first North American dates were announced on 16 April 2024.

== Critical reception ==
Professional ratings
Aggregate scores
Source	Rating
AnyDecentMusic?	6.6/10
Metacritic	74/100
Review scores
Source	Rating
AllMusic	4/5 stars
Clash	8/10
The Guardian	2/5 stars
The Independent	3/5 stars
NME	4/5 stars
Pitchfork	7.0/10
The Observer	4/5 stars
The Times	4/5 stars
Tom Hull	B+
La Vanguardia	3/5 stars

On Metacritic, a review aggregator site that compiles reviews from mainstream publications and assigns a weighted average score out of 100, the album received a score of 74 that was based on 9 reviews. AnyDecentMusic? compiled 9 reviews and gave the album a score of 6.6 out of 10.

Jordi Bardají of Jenesaispop wrote that "even though Shakira states that it is a conceptual album, it is not a conceptual album nor sounds like one". The publication also raised the question of whether the singer-songwriter was "lazy" or if her intention was just to make a compilation of pre-released hit singles. In the same review, Shakira's vocal delivery is praised. Some critics, including La Vanguardia's Esteban Linés and El País's Carlos Marcos, described the project or some of its songs as "opportunistic".

Jon Pareles of The New York Times noted how most of the album "deals with romantic ups and (mostly) downs, honed into crisp, tuneful pop structures", pointing out how Shakira continues her "career-long penchant for pulling together music and collaborators from across the Americas" while serving a wide variety of music genres. Bass Magazine hailed the album as a "dazzling testament to her resilience and strength, as well as music's power to transform even the most trying experiences into precious moments." Emma Harrison of Clash gave the album 8 out of 10 and described it as "revelatory, raw but resplendent throughout, Las Mujeres Ya No Lloran is one of Shakira's best albums to date and is a fitting testimony to her strength and resilience turning what was a devastating situation into a beautiful body of work." She also noted that "the She Wolf is back and she is howling louder and prouder than ever." Lucas Villa of NME noted that "after going through one of the most devastating celebrity breakups this decade, Shakira has spun her heartbreak into global pop gold..." with a 4 star review. Rolling Stone noted that "in a crowded Latin music landscape, Shakira's first album in 7 years reaffirms her relevance and dominance." Variety called the album "a Latin pop music odyssey" and stated that "Las Mujeres Ya No Lloran is the updated testament to [Shakira's] successful track record."

Some critics, including Rolling Stone's Suzy Exposito and AllMusic's Neil Z. Yeung, criticized the excessive number of pre-released singles and the album's track order, deeming Las Mujeres Ya No Lloran as a mixtape or as a greatest hits album rather than a studio album. Alexis Petridis of The Guardian gave the album a negative review, lamenting that the album "settles for gliding in one ear and out the other without leaving much impression [...] the state of sublime mediocrity in which a lot of current pop chooses to operate."

== Accolades ==
Year	Award ceremony	Category	Result	Ref.
2024	Latin Grammy Awards	Album of the Year	Nominated	
2024	Premios Juventud	Best Pop/Urban Album	Won	
2025	Grammy Awards	Best Latin Pop Album	Won	
2025	iHeartRadio Music Awards	Latin Pop/Urban Album of the Year	Won	

== Commercial performance ==
Las Mujeres Ya No Lloran debuted at number 13 on the US Billboard 200, with 34,000 album-equivalent units sold during its first week. It was the second best-selling album of the week, with around 15,000 copies sold (of which 6,000 were vinyl LPs), while also accumulating 26.73 million official on-demand streams. It debuted at number one on the Top Latin Albums and Top Latin Pop Albums charts, making Shakira the first woman with number-one albums across four decades on the Billboard Latin album charts.

Las Mujeres Ya No Lloran debuted atop of the Spanish Album Chart, becoming her first number-one album since Sale el Sol (2010).

== Track listing ==
Tracks 9 to 15 of the tracklist were revealed on 15 February 2024. The remaining tracks were revealed on 29 February 2024.

Las Mujeres Ya No Lloran – physical version
No.	Title	Writer(s)	Producer(s)	Length
1.	"Puntería" (with Cardi B)	David Stewart; Shakira; Carolina Colón; Belcalis Almanzar; Daniela Blau	David Stewart; Shakira	3:01
2.	"La Fuerte" (with Bizarrap)	Shakira; Gonzalo Conde; Kevyn Cruz; Alberto Meléndez; Leonardo Zapata	Bizarrap; Shakira	2:44
3.	"Tiempo Sin Verte"	Shakira; Marcos Masís; Richi López; Elena Rose; Meléndez; Edwin "Jota" Rosa	Tainy; Albert Hype; Shakira; Richi López; Jota Rosa	3:16
4.	"Cohete" (with Rauw Alejandro)	Shakira; Raul Ocasio; David A. Sprecher; Mario Cáceres; Vicente Jiménez	Shakira; Yeti Beats; TROY NōKA; Mr. NaisGai; DallasK	2:52
5.	"(Entre Paréntesis)" (with Grupo Frontera)	Shakira; Cruz; Edgar Barrera; Yohanes Manuel; Lenin Palacios	Edge; Keityn; Shakira	2:48
6.	"Cómo Dónde y Cuándo"	Shakira; Servando Primera; Rafa Rodríguez; Daniel Rondón	Albert Hype; Shakira	2:59
7.	"Nassau"	Shakira; Masís; Meléndez; The Roommates; Aldae; Colón; Blau; Cruz; Taylor Parks	Tainy; Albert Hype; The Roommates; Shakira; Aldae; AoD	2:36
8.	"Última"	Shakira; Cruz; Cristian Álvarez	Ciey; Shakira; Albert Hype; Keityn	2:58
9.	"Te Felicito" (with Rauw Alejandro)	Santiago Múnera; Palacios; Cruz; Andrés Uribe; Andrés Acosta; Raúl Ocasio; Shakira; Alberto Melendez	Shakira; Keityn; Albert Hype; Ily Wonder; L.E.X.U.Z	2:52
10.	"Monotonía" (with Ozuna)	Shakira; Juan Carlos Ozuna; Meléndez; Alejandro Robledo; Álvarez; Cruz; Sergio Robledo	Shakira; Keityn; Albert Hype; Ciey; Nup	2:41
11.	"Shakira: Bzrp Music Sessions, Vol. 53" (with Bizarrap)	Shakira; Cruz; Conde; Santiago Alvarado; Francisco Zecca	Bizarrap	3:37
12.	"TQG" (with Karol G)	Carolina Giraldo; Shakira; Cruz; Daniel Echavarría	Ovy on the Drums	3:19
13.	"Acróstico" (Milan + Sasha)	Shakira; Cruz; Palacios; Luis Fernando Ochoa	Shakira; L.E.X.U.Z	2:51
14.	"Copa Vacía" (with Manuel Turizo)	Colón; Blau; Shakira; Dallas Koehke; Juan Medina; Julián Turizo; Miguel Martínez	Shakira; DallasK; Slow Mike; L.E.X.U.Z; Albert Hype	2:54
15.	"El Jefe" (with Fuerza Regida)	Shakira; Cruz; Barrera; Manuel Lorente	Shakira; Edge; Keityn	2:50
16.	"Shakira: Bzrp Music Sessions, Vol. 53" (Tiësto remix; with Bizarrap)	Shakira; Cruz; Conde; Alvarado; Zecca	Tiësto; Bizarrap	3:36
Total length:				48:00

Las Mujeres Ya No Lloran – digital version
No.	Title	Writer(s)	Producer(s)	Length
17.	"Puntería" (vinyl version; with Cardi B)	Stewart; Shakira; Colón; Almanzar; Blau	David Stewart; Shakira	3:09
Total length:				51:13

Notes

- The album consists of 16 tracks. CD and vinyl pressings of the album include a different version of "Puntería", which is also present on digital versions of the album as track 17. The original version of "Puntería" features Cardi B singing and rapping in English and Spanish, while in the vinyl version she sings only in Spanish.
- "La Fuerte" contains elements of "Harder, Better, Faster, Stronger", as performed by Daft Punk.

== Charts ==
=== Weekly charts ===
Weekly chart performance for Las Mujeres Ya No Lloran
Chart (2024)	Peak position
Austrian Albums (Ö3 Austria)	8
Belgian Albums (Ultratop Flanders)	22
Belgian Albums (Ultratop Wallonia)	14
Canadian Albums (Billboard)	73
Croatian International Albums (HDU)	16
Dutch Albums (Album Top 100)	24
French Albums (SNEP)	12
German Albums (Offizielle Top 100)	15
Greek Albums (IFPI)	14
Hungarian Physical Albums (MAHASZ)	28
Italian Albums (FIMI)	27
Polish Albums (ZPAV)	31
Portuguese Albums (AFP)	9
Scottish Albums (Official Charts)	41
Spanish Albums (Promusicae)	1
Swiss Albums (Schweizer Hitparade)	4
UK Albums Sales (OCC)	32
US Billboard 200	13
US Latin Pop Albums (Billboard)	1
US Top Latin Albums (Billboard)	1

=== Year-end charts ===
Yearly chart performance for Las Mujeres Ya No Lloran
Chart (2024)	Position
Spanish Albums (PROMUSICAE)	14

== Certifications ==
Certifications for Las Mujeres Ya No Lloran
Region	Certification	Certified units/sales
Brazil (Pro-Música Brasil)	Platinum	40,000^{‡}
Canada (Music Canada)	Gold	40,000^{‡}
Colombia	Platinum+3× Gold	
Italy (FIMI)	Gold	25,000^{‡}
Mexico (AMPROFON)	3× Platinum	420,000^{‡}
Spain (Promusicae)	Platinum	40,000^{‡}
United States (RIAA)	7× Platinum (Latin)	420,000^{‡}
Summaries
Central America (CFC)	2× Platinum	
^{‡} Sales+streaming figures based on certification alone.

== Release history ==
Release history for Las Mujeres Ya No Lloran
Region	Date	Format(s)	Label	Ref.
United States	22 March 2024	CD; vinyl LP; digital download; streaming	Sony Latin	
United Kingdom	22 March 2024	CD; vinyl LP; digital download; streaming	RCA UK	
