= Te Felicito (Shakira and Rauw Alejandro song) =

2022 single by Shakira and Rauw Alejandro

Single by Shakira and Rauw Alejandro

from the album Las Mujeres Ya No Lloran
- Released: 21 April 2022
- Genre: Electropop; reggaeton
- Length: 2:52
- Label: Sony Latin
- Songwriters: Shakira; Keityn; Ily Wonder; Rauw Alejandro; Dark Lion
- Producers: Shakira; Keityn; Albert Hype; Ily Wonder; L.E.X.U.Z

Shakira singles chronology
"Don't Wait Up" (2021)	"Te Felicito" (2022)	"Don't You Worry" (2022)

Rauw Alejandro singles chronology
"Agua" (2022)	"Te Felicito" (2022)	"Loco por Perrearte" (2022)

Music video
- "Te Felicito" on YouTube

"Te Felicito" (transl. "I Congratulate You") is a song by Colombian singer-songwriter Shakira and Puerto Rican singer-songwriter Rauw Alejandro. The song was released on 21 April 2022, through Sony Music Latin, as the lead single from Shakira's twelfth studio album, Las Mujeres Ya No Lloran (2024).

== Background and release ==
On 9 April 2022, a tweet appeared on Shakira's Twitter account, stating "Te felicito que bien actúas" ("I congratulate you on acting well"). The tweet was deleted soon afterwards, but it led to speculation on social media about who the tweet was aimed at. The following week, the appearance of a white robot on the thumbnails of six of Shakira's most popular music videos caused further speculation. On 14 April 2022, Shakira posted the cover of the single, featuring her dressed in the white robot costume, on her Instagram account, announcing its release on 22 April 2022.

== Recording and composition ==
Colombian songwriter Keityn confirmed in an interview with Puerto Rican radio host Molusco that he had composed "Te Felicito" before he even met Shakira. He later presented the song to her in 2021 and worked on the song together.

== Music video ==
The music video was directed by long-time collaborator Jaume de Laiguana. Its cinematography was handled by Xavi Giménez. It has a futuristic visual appeal, neon and pastel color schemes, and robotic hip hop choreography. Thematically, several scenes in the video are inspired by Frankenstein (by Mary Shelley); Shakira’s character is portrayed as a female “Dr. Frankenstein” figure, as she is heartbroken over a recent breakup and begins “building” her ideal man (played by Rauw Alejandro). She can be seen digging through a box of “spare parts”, taken from mannequins and dolls, and working on a life-like figure (Rauw Alejandro) in her dark and clandestine “workshop”. Shakira is seen wearing a gas mask and using power tools as she constructs her perfect male figure. There is a scene where Rauw’s sleeping head is seen stored in a refrigerator, and he opens his eyes and mouth to sing ”…los tengo rojos,” before coming fully to life. Rauw Alejandro’s character begins singing his verses and dancing the Robot with Shakira. About halfway through the video, Shakira lights a neon green fire circle, and begins to dance in the center of it while surrounded by the flames. Shakira and Rauw Alejandro strike a pose as the song ends. Just as the video fades to black, Shakira can be seen making kissing gestures toward the camera.

== Commercial performance ==
In the United States, "Te Felicito" topped the Billboard Latin Airplay chart with an audience impression of 10.52 million, extending Shakira's record as the female artist with the most number ones on the chart. The song also topped the Latin Pop Airplay, and Latin Rhythm Airplay. The song also peaked at number 10 on Hot Latin Songs chart. The song debuted at 88 on US Hot 100, becoming Shakira's 23rd and Rauw's fifth entry, later peaking at number 67.

The song was successful throughout Latin America, reaching the top 10 on all charts it entered, and topping numerous airplay charts, including Argentina, Colombia, Costa Rica, El Salvador, Peru and Uruguay. "Te Felicito" also became Shakira's first number-one single on the Billboard Argentina Hot 100, which was launched in October 2018.

"Te Felicito" peaked at number four on the Russian airplay chart. In Europe, the song peaked at number two in Spain, where the song was certified quadruple platinum by Promusicae for selling 240,000 units in the country. It was less successful in Switzerland, where the song debuted at number 88 on the week ending June 19 and reached number 71, as well in France, where it peaked only at number 53.

Globally, the song peaked at number 11 on Billboard Global 200 chart, while peaking at number six on the Billboard Global 200 Excl. US. The song became Shakira's second top 100 entry on the Global 200 and her first top 10. It also became her second top 30 and first top 10 on the Excl. US chart.

"Te Felicito" was the 15th most streamed song in summer 2022 on Spotify globally.

== Reception ==
American news website BuzzFeed News named "Te Felicito" as one of the "26 Songs That Defined 2022" stating that "it feels like Colombian pop star Shakira doesn’t rest, and never misses." Latina magazine placed the song at number two on their list of the “Top 20 Songs of 2022 by Latina Artists”, stating that "the Colombian icon seemingly and masterfully channeled that heartbreak into one of the year’s most cutting kiss-off anthems. Like Rihanna in 'Take a Bow', Shakira compared an ex-lover to an actor who played a part during their relationship. Shakira got her groove back." Billboard magazine named "Te Felicito" as one of the “17 Biggest Song Collaborations of 2022”.

== Awards and nominations ==
Awards and nominations for "Te Felicito"
Year	Ceremony	Category	Result	Ref.
2022	Billboard Latin Music Awards	Latin Pop Song of the Year	Nominated	
2022	MTV Europe Music Awards	Best Collaboration	Nominated	
2022	Latin Grammy Awards	Record of the Year	Nominated	
2022	Los 40 Music Awards	Mejor Canción	Nominated	
2022	Los 40 Music Awards	Mejor Videoclip	Won	
2022	Los 40 Music Awards	Mejor Colaboración	Nominated	
2022	WME Awards	Latin Song	Nominated	

== Charts ==
=== Weekly charts ===
Weekly chart performance for "Te Felicito"
Chart (2022–2023)	Peak position
Argentina Hot 100 (Billboard)	1
Argentina Airplay (Monitor Latino)	1
Belarus (TopHit)	25
Belarus Airplay (TopHit)	5
Bolivia Songs (Billboard)	3
Bolivia (Monitor Latino)	2
Brazil (Top 10 Latino)	10
Central America (Monitor Latino)	1
Chile Songs (Billboard)	9
Chile (Monitor Latino)	5
CIS Airplay (TopHit)	5
Colombia Songs (Billboard)	8
Colombia (Monitor Latino)	1
Costa Rica (Monitor Latino)	1
Croatia (HRT)	32
Dominican Republic (Monitor Latino)	2
Ecuador Songs (Billboard)	7
Ecuador (Monitor Latino)	1
El Salvador (Monitor Latino)	1
El Salvador (ASAP EGC)	1
France (SNEP)	53
Global 200 (Billboard)	11
Guatemala (Monitor Latino)	3
Honduras (Monitor Latino)	3
Kazakhstan Airplay (TopHit)	80
Latin America (Monitor Latino)	1
Lithuania Airplay (TopHit)	146
Mexico (Billboard Mexican Airplay)	5
Mexico (Billboard Mexican Espanol Airplay)	1
Mexico (Billboard)	4
Mexico Streaming (AMPROFON)	4
Nicaragua (Monitor Latino)	2
Panama (PRODUCE)	3
Panama (Monitor Latino)	3
Paraguay (Monitor Latino)	2
Peru Songs (Billboard)	5
Peru (Monitor Latino)	1
Portugal (AFP)	81
Puerto Rico (Monitor Latino)	2
Russia Airplay (TopHit)	3
Spain (PROMUSICAE)	2
Spain (Billboard)	2
Switzerland (Schweizer Hitparade)	71
Ukraine (TopHit)	51
Ukraine Airplay (TopHit)	17
Uruguay (Monitor Latino)	1
US Billboard Hot 100	67
US Hot Latin Songs (Billboard)	10
US Latin Airplay (Billboard)	1
US Latin Digital Song Sales (Billboard)	2
US Latin Pop Airplay (Billboard)	1
US Latin Rhythm Airplay (Billboard)	1
Venezuela (Monitor Latino)	8
Venezuela (Record Report)	35

=== Monthly charts ===
Monthly chart performance for "Te Felicito"
Chart (2022)	Peak position
Russia Airplay (TopHit)	3
Paraguay (SPG)	2
Ukraine Airplay (TopHit)	33
Uruguay (CUD)	3

=== Year-end charts ===
2022 year-end chart performance for "Te Felicito"
Chart (2022)	Position
CIS (TopHit)	19
Global 200 (Billboard)	82
Russia Airplay (TopHit)	18
Spain (PROMUSICAE)	9
US Hot Latin Songs (Billboard)	19

2023 year-end chart performance for "Te Felicito"
Chart (2023)	Position
Belarus (TopHit)	114
CIS (TopHit)	147
Guatemala (Monitor Latino)	80
Honduras (Monitor Latino)	62
Nicaragua (Monitor Latino)	59
Panama (Monitor Latino)	34
Paraguay (Monitor Latino)	70
Russia Airplay (TopHit)	120
Spain (PROMUSICAE)	70
US Latin Pop Airplay (Billboard)	16

== Certifications ==
Certifications and sales for "Te Felicito"
Region	Certification	Certified units/sales
Brazil (Pro-Música Brasil)	2× Platinum	80,000^{‡}
Canada (Music Canada)	Gold	40,000^{‡}
Colombia	2× Diamond+4× Platinum+8× Gold	
France (SNEP)	Platinum	200,000^{‡}
Italy (FIMI)	Gold	50,000^{‡}
Mexico (AMPROFON)	Diamond+3× Platinum	1,120,000^{‡}
Peru	Platinum	
Portugal (AFP)	Gold	5,000^{‡}
Spain (Promusicae)	7× Platinum	420,000^{‡}
Switzerland (IFPI Switzerland)	Gold	10,000^{‡}
United States (RIAA)	24× Platinum (Latin)	1,440,000^{‡}
Streaming
Chile (PROFOVI)	Platinum	29,784,012
^{‡} Sales+streaming figures based on certification alone.

== See also ==
- List of Billboard Hot Latin Songs and Latin Airplay number ones of 2022
- List of best-selling singles in Spain
