= La Razón (Mexico) =

Mexican newspaper

La Razón de México
- An informed person is always right
- Type: Journal
- Format: Tabloid and Digital
- Owner: L.R.H.G. Informativo
- Founder: Ramiro Garza Cantú y Ramiro Garza Vargas
- President: Mario Navarrete y Adrián Castillo.
- Founded: 18 May 2009
- Language: Spanish
- Headquarters: CDMX, Mexico
- City: Mexico City
- Country: Mexico
- Price: $10 MXN
- Website: https://www.razon.com.mx/

La Razón de México is a multiplatform newspaper published in Mexico City. Its new era began to circulate throughout the country on May 18, 2009.

== History ==
La Razón de México is a multiplatform newspaper founded by Ramiro Garza Cantú and Ramiro Garza Vargas on May 18, 2009, in Mexico City.

Its printed version circulates from Monday to Saturday nationwide, and its website with real-time information can be consulted on website and on all social networks every day.

He also produces and streams on his YouTube channel.

La Razón de México regularly publishes two supplements: El Cultural, which appears every Saturday, and La Razón Empresarial, from the commercial team, which is usually circulated monthly.

It is aimed at all people whose decisions influence the direction of the country: professionals, students, businessmen, politicians.

== Awards ==
For the quality of its design and infographics, which characterize it, it has been awarded on multiple occasions by the Society for News Design.

== Organization ==
Its board of directors is currently made up of Mario Navarrete (General Director) and Adrian Castillo (editorial director).

General Director	Mario Navarrete
Editorial Director	Adrian Castillo

== Columnists ==
Among its columnists and editorialists are:

- Javier Solórzano
- Mónica Garza
- Bibiana Belsasso
- Rafael Rojas
- Francisco Cárdenas Cruz
- Valeria Villa
- Mauricio Flores
- Pedro Sánchez
- Guillermo Hurtado
- Carlos Olivares Baró
- Ubaldo Díaz
- Montserrat Salomón
- Arturo Damm Arnal
- Francisco Reséndiz
- Julio Pilotzi
- Héctor Badillo
- Gabriel Morales Sod
- Antonio Fernández
