= El Jefe (song) =

Single by Shakira and Fuerza Regida

from the album Las Mujeres Ya No Lloran
- Language: Spanish
- English title: "The Boss"
- Released: September 20, 2023
- Studio: 5020 Studios (Miami, FL)
- Genre: Regional Mexican; urban sierreño; Corrido tumbado
- Length: 2:50
- Label: Sony Latin
- Songwriters: Shakira Isabel Mebarak Ripoll; Edgar Barrera; Kevyn Mauricio Cruz; Manuel Lorente Freiré
- Producers: Shakira; Edgar Barrera; Keityn

Shakira singles chronology
"Copa Vacía" (2023)	"El Jefe" (2023)	"Puntería" (2024)

Fuerza Regida singles chronology
"Qué Onda" (2023)	"El Jefe" (2023)	"Antídoto" (2024)

Music video
- "El Jefe" on YouTube

"El Jefe" (English: "The Boss") is a song by the Colombian singer Shakira and American band of regional Mexican music, Fuerza Regida. It was released on September 20, 2023, through Sony Music Latin as the fifth single from Shakira's twelfth studio album, Las Mujeres Ya No Lloran (2024).

It is Shakira's first song that she performs in a regional Mexican genre, and it is the first collaboration between both artists.

== Background and release ==
After Shakira's June release of "Copa Vacía" with Manuel Turizo, and Fuerza Regida's active 2023, the Colombian singer shared a preview of the video and her song in mid-September 2023, scheduled to be released on September 20 of that year.

== Reception ==
=== Media and critical comments ===
The song received generally good reviews, highlighting the singer's versatility and the group's good adaptation to Shakira. The launch generated multiple reactions on social networks and the media, being one of the most talked about topics in Latin America. The news channel CNN en Español compared Shakira to Bad Bunny for "riding the wave" of the recent popularity of the regional genre, since the latter collaborated in early 2023 with Grupo Frontera. Fashion magazine Harper's Bazaar called the song "an anthem for labor rights". The newspaper El Confidencial described it as "a Mexican corrido with strong social criticism". The American magazine Billboard named the collaboration as "a reflection of the dominance and influence of Mexican music on current Latin music" also believing that it is a "catchy corrido".

== Music and lyrics ==
"El Jefe"
A 17 second sample from the chorus performed by Fuerza Regida and Shakira.

Musically, the song is a fast-paced polka with Sinaloan sierreño instrumentation. Lyrically, It is a protest song that criticizes social inequality; also addressing issues such as the migration of Latin people to the United States, labor discrimination, and low-paid work. The lyrics includes, "Tengo un jefe de mierda que no me paga bien / Yo llego caminando y el en Mercedes-Benz / Me tiene de recluta / El muy hijo de puta".

== Impact ==
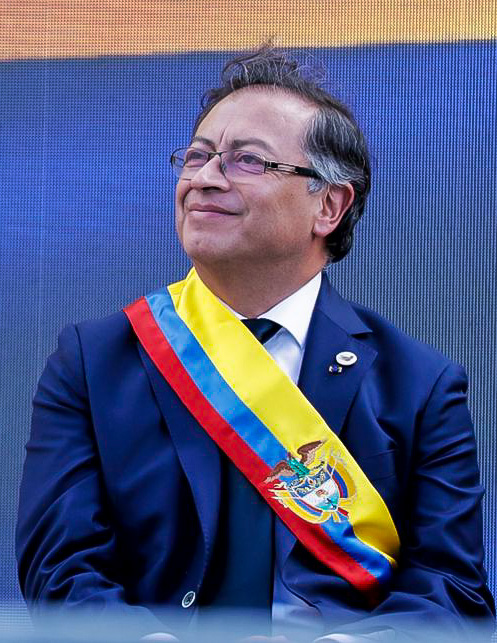
"When we talk about labor reform, what we want, as Shakira says in her latest song, is that I published it because it hit the nail on the head. Shakira hit the nail on the head..."- Gustavo Petro, President of Colombia, 2023.

On September 24, 2023, the president of Colombia, Gustavo Petro referenced the song in a post on Twitter to promote the labor reform promoted by his government in the Legislature, tweeting “That's why labor reform is needed”. in the aforementioned speech and with high spirits, Gustavo Petro felt that it was time to remember his message and once again made reference to the lyrics of 'El Jefe.' Shakira's press office in Colombia later responded to the use of the song saying "At no time has the artist authorized the use of the most recent single titled 'El Jefe', in political or partisan contexts, as was evident in previous days, to promote the labor reform of this government".

== Music video ==
The official music video was released on Shakira's official YouTube channel along with the single on September 20, 2023 and shows the singer in denim and Texan clothing and the group performing the song in a neighborhood, and then on a cleared field and the group in an area where they pack packages and other things. The video was recorded in Miami and directed by Jora Frantzis. In the video, different images appear, such as several Latino migrants traveling on a train; a way in which Latin American people actually cross into the United States illegally. Shakira wore Mexican milliner Gladys Tamez's custom designs in her music video.

== Charts ==
Chart performance for "El Jefe"
Chart (2023)	Peak position
Argentina Hot 100 (Billboard)	43
Bolivia (Billboard)	12
Colombia (Billboard)	7
Ecuador (Billboard)	13
El Salvador (Monitor Latino)	12
Global 200 (Billboard)	24
Guatemala (Monitor Latino)	15
Mexico (Billboard)	10
Nicaragua (Monitor Latino)	5
Panama (PRODUCE)	48
Peru (Billboard)	18
Spain (Promusicae)	12
US Billboard Hot 100	55
US Hot Latin Songs (Billboard)	4
US Latin Airplay (Billboard)	1
US Regional Mexican Airplay (Billboard)	9

== Certifications ==
Certifications for "El Jefe"
Region	Certification	Certified units/sales
Colombia	Platinum+2× Gold	
Mexico (AMPROFON)	2× Platinum	280,000^{‡}
Spain (Promusicae)	Gold	30,000^{‡}
United States (RIAA)	8× Platinum (Latin)	480,000^{‡}
^{‡} Sales+streaming figures based on certification alone.
