= Monotonía =

2022 single by Shakira and Ozuna

Single by Shakira and Ozuna

from the album Las Mujeres Ya No Lloran
- Language: Spanish
- Released: 19 October 2022
- Recorded: 2021
- Studio: A2F Studios (Miami, FL)
- Genre: Bachata
- Length: 2:39
- Label: Sony Latin
- Composers: Shakira; Ozuna; Keityn; Albert Hype; Noise Up; Ciey; Primo
- Lyricist: Keityn
- Producers: Shakira; Keityn; Albert Hype; Ciey; Noise Up

Shakira singles chronology
"Don't You Worry" (2022)	"Monotonía" (2022)	"Shakira: Bzrp Music Sessions, Vol. 53" (2023)

Ozuna singles chronology
"Mañana" (2022)	"Monotonía" (2022)	"Mar Chiquita" (2022)

Music video
- "Monotonía" on YouTube

"Monotonía" (English: "Monotony") is a song by Colombian singer-songwriter Shakira and Puerto Rican singer Ozuna. The song was released on 19 October 2022, through Sony Music Latin as the second single from Shakira's twelfth studio album, Las Mujeres Ya No Lloran (2024).

== Background and release ==
Contrary to rumors and speculation by the media and fans, Shakira did not write the lyrics to "Monotonía". The lyrics were written almost entirely by Colombian songwriter Keityn at least a year before the song was offered to Shakira. He stated in an interview that close to the song's release Shakira updated the line "Me dejaste por tu narcisismo..." ("You left me because of your narcissism...") which originally was "Fuimos víctimas del egoísmo" ("We were victims of selfishness"), stating that that was her only contribution to the lyrics. Shakira has been open before about suffering from writer's block since she started her relationship with her ex-partner Gerard Piqué. Therefore, Monotonía becomes only the 14th song from her catalog of over 145 songs on which she did not act as a lyricist.

On 6 October 2022, Shakira began posting cryptic videos on her social media, teasing new music. The first stating "No fue culpa tuya..." ("It wasn't your fault"). The following day Shakira posted a follow-up video that said "Ni tampoco mía" ("Nor mine"). The final video of these teasers said "Fue culpa de la monotonía" ("It was monotony's fault"). After these tweets, Shakira then posted a teaser to the song's music video of someone stepping on a heart.

The single was announced on 9 October 2022 and was released on 19 October 2022. The song is a bachata track and is scheduled to be included on Shakira's forthcoming album. It was her first release since she announced her breakup with Gerard Piqué and quickly gained attention with the video surpassing 14 million views in 10 hours. The video shows several different references to Shakira's relationship with Piqué from how she felt heartbroken to how she is moving on from it.

== Music video ==
The official music video was filmed on 10 and 11 September 2022 in Manresa. It was released along with the song on 19 October 2022. It was co-directed by Shakira and long-time collaborator Jaume de Laiguana. Its cinematography was handled by Xavi Giménez.

The video starts with a depressed-looking Shakira walking through a grocery store while eating chips with her previous single "Te Felicito" playing in the background. Shakira then runs into what is presumed to be her ex-lover and starts crying while singing the first chorus of the song. As she starts backing away, the ex-lover pulls out a cannon that shoots Shakira in the chest blasting her heart out onto the floor. As Shakira lies unconscious in a pool of blood on the floor, Ozuna starts singing the chorus of the song while looking down at her. Shakira then regains consciousness and crawls on the floor picking up her beating heart with a hole in her chest. The video then transitions into a public area where Shakira is trembling and then running through a sidewalk with her heart in her hand. As Shakira keeps accidentally bumping into people, she then drops her heart while watching others step on it. Shakira then picks up her heart as she sings the chorus. The video then transitions into its final scene where Shakira walks into a room full of locked away items. Ozuna opens a metal box for Shakira so she can lock her heart away. As Ozuna locks Shakira's heart away, Shakira turns to walk out with a smile.

=== Reception ===
Globally, the music video for the song reached over 20 million views on YouTube within its first 24 hours of its release, making it the biggest Spanish-language debut on YouTube in 2022, and became the most-viewed Latin video on its release day by a female artist in the history of YouTube. It also debuted at number one on the weekly Global YouTube Music Videos Chart with 23.6 million views from a partial week of tracking. It received another 43.4 million views during the 21–27 October tracking period. The count topped its first week's mark by 84%.

== Critical reception ==
The song received generally positive reviews. Harpers Bazaar called the song's lyrics "pensive and heartbreaking". Pitchfork said that the song "perfectly captures the timbre of heartache, the kind of pain that only comes from having experienced the height of pleasure" and praised the singers' vocal delivery stating that "Ozuna's angelic croon complements Shakira's dour resignation". Variety wrote that the song and the video "encapsulates that heart-wrenching pain – literally".

Jon Pareles of The New York Times stated that "bachata puts heartbreak at a distance by placing it within a neatly syncopated grid; both Shakira and Ozuna sing like they'll get over it".

== Accolades ==
Award nominations for "Monotonía"
Year	Ceremony	Award	Result	Ref.
2023	Latin American Music Awards	Best Collaboration - Tropical	Won	
2023	Premios Nuestra Tierra	Song of the Year	Nominated	
2023	Premios Juventud	Best Tropical Mix	Won	
2023	Billboard Latin Music Awards	Tropical Song of the Year	Nominated	
2023	Billboard Latin Music Awards	Airplay Song of the Year	Nominated	
2023	Latino Music Awards	Best Tropical Song	Nominated	
2023	Premios Rolling Stone en Español	Song of the Year	Pending	

== Commercial performance ==
The song had the biggest debut for a female artist in history for Spotify in Mexico and Colombia. It debuted at number 12 on the global Spotify chart with 2.96 million streams.

In Spain, the song debuted at number 64 on Promusicae charts from only one day of release in a full tracking week. The song soared to number three the week after. The song was certified gold by Promusicae in 14 days for selling over 30,000 units in the country.

In the United States, the song sold 22,700 equivalent units on its first day, of which 2,000 were digital downloads and 3.1 million were on-demand streams, debuting at number one on Billboard's Latin Digital Song Sales chart from a single day of tracking. The song debuted at number 65 on the Billboard Hot 100 and peaked at number three on Billboard's Hot Latin Songs with 64,700 equivalent units, of which 9.4 million were from on-demand streams, and further 2,000 digital downloads, earning Shakira her 32nd top 10 hit on the chart and extending her record as the woman with the most top 10 hits on the chart. "Monotonia" also continued its reign at number one spot on Latin Digital Song Sales chart for a second chart week. It sold a total of 87,400 equivalent units in its first eight tracking days.

== Charts ==
=== Weekly charts ===
Weekly chart performance for "Monotonía"
Chart (2022–2023)	Peak position
Argentina Hot 100 (Billboard)	7
Argentina (Monitor Latino)	2
Bolivia (Billboard)	2
Bolivia (Monitor Latino)	4
Brazil (Top 10 Latino)	2
Chile (Billboard)	5
Chile (Monitor Latino)	3
Colombia (Billboard)	3
Colombia (Monitor Latino)	3
Costa Rica (Monitor Latino)	22
Croatia (HRT)	35
Dominican Republic (Monitor Latino)	27
Ecuador (Billboard)	3
Ecuador (Monitor Latino)	2
El Salvador (Monitor Latino)	1
Estonia (TopHit)	15
France (SNEP)	137
Germany (TopHit)	7
Global 200 (Billboard)	18
Guatemala (Monitor Latino)	9
Honduras (Monitor Latino)	4
Italy (FIMI)	67
Latin America (Monitor Latino)	1
Latvia (TopHit)	8
Lithuania (TopHit)	4
Mexico (Billboard)	2
Mexico (Monitor Latino)	1
Nicaragua (Monitor Latino)	17
Panama (Monitor Latino)	8
Paraguay (Monitor Latino)	2
Peru (Billboard)	2
Perú (Monitor Latino)	5
Poland (TopHit)	6
Portugal (AFP)	21
Puerto Rico (Monitor Latino)	3
Romania (TopHit)	104
Spain (PROMUSICAE)	3
Suriname (Nationale Top 40)	27
Switzerland (Schweizer Hitparade)	17
Switzerland (Billboard)	18
Uruguay (Monitor Latino)	7
USA (Monitor Latino)	3
US Billboard Hot 100	65
US Hot Latin Songs (Billboard)	3
US Latin Digital Song Sales (Billboard)	1
US Latin Airplay (Billboard)	1
US Tropical Airplay (Billboard)	1
Venezuela (Record Report)	33

=== Monthly charts ===
Monthly chart performance for "Monotonía"
Chart (2022)	Peak position
Paraguay (SPG)	36
Uruguay (CUDISCO)	6

=== Year-end charts ===
2022 year-end chart performance for "Monotonía"
Chart (2022)	Position
Spain (PROMUSICAE)	94

2023 year-end chart performance for "Monotonía"
Chart (2023)	Position
Bolivia (Monitor Latino)	59
Chile (Monitor Latino)	50
Dominican Republic (Monitor Latino)	80
Ecuador (Monitor Latino)	60
El Salvador (Monitor Latino)	30
Germany (TopHit)	166
Global 200 (Billboard)	199
Guatemala (Monitor Latino)	20
Lithuania (TopHit)	157
Nicaragua (Monitor Latino)	40
Spain (PROMUSICAE)	58
Panama (Monitor Latino)	38
Paraguay (Monitor Latino)	36
Peru (Monitor Latino)	54
Poland (TopHit)	115
Puerto Rico (Monitor Latino)	83
US Hot Latin Songs (Billboard)	48
US Latin Airplay (Billboard)	4
Venezuela (Monitor Latino)	94

== Certifications ==
Certifications and sales for "Monotonía"
Region	Certification	Certified units/sales
Brazil (Pro-Música Brasil)	2× Platinum	80,000^{‡}
Canada (Music Canada)	Gold	40,000^{‡}
Colombia	Diamond+3× Platinum+6× Gold	
France (SNEP)	Gold	100,000^{‡}
Italy (FIMI)	Gold	50,000^{‡}
Mexico (AMPROFON)	4× Platinum+Gold	630,000^{‡}
Portugal (AFP)	Platinum	10,000^{‡}
Spain (Promusicae)	4× Platinum	240,000^{‡}
United States (RIAA)	16× Platinum (Latin)	960,000^{‡}
Streaming
Chile (PROFOVI)	Gold	11,738,198
^{‡} Sales+streaming figures based on certification alone.

== See also ==
- List of Billboard Hot Latin Songs and Latin Airplay number ones of 2022
- List of Billboard Hot Latin Songs and Latin Airplay number ones of 2023
