= Cultural impact of Shakira =

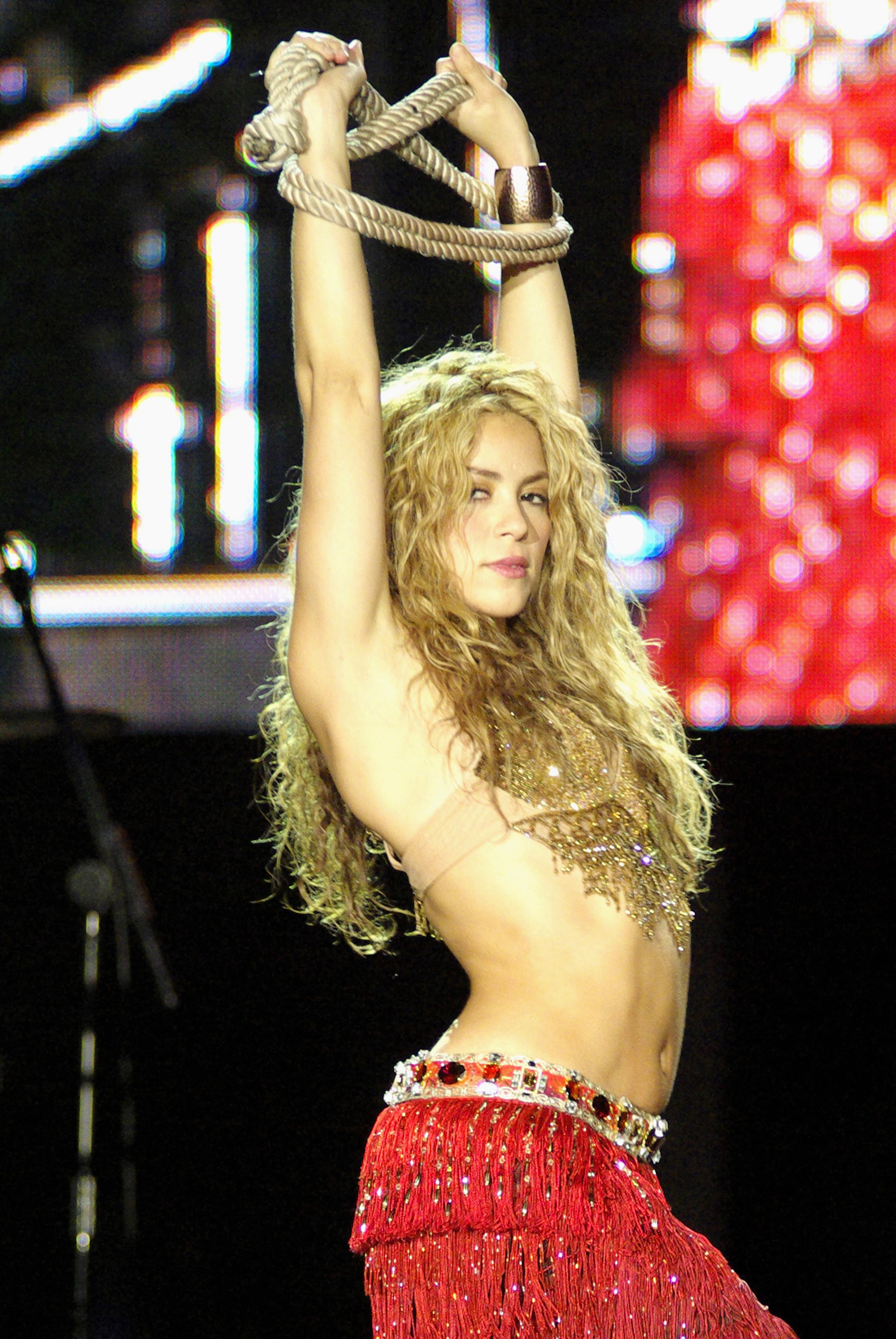
Shakira at the Rock in Rio festival in 2008

Colombian singer-songwriter Shakira has had a considerable impact on the musical landscape of Latin America and further afield. Further to this, her career has seen longevity and cultural reach that has enabled Shakira to be a socially, culturally, and politically influential figure across the world. This has culminated in her receiving the honorific nickname of the Queen of Latin Music. She is considered the most recognizable face of Latin music around the world. With 95 million records sold, she is the best-selling Latin female artist of all time. In 2024 Billboard placed her at number 17 on its list of "The Greatest Pop Stars of the 21st Century," being the only Latina to appear on the list.

As of 2018, according to Forbes, Shakira was the most commercially successful woman in Latin music through her album sales, thus making her one of the best-selling music artists of all time. Vogue writer Carla Ramirez referred to Shakira as the greatest Latin female icon in history and journalist Queralt Uceda from La Vanguardia credits Shakira for being largely responsible for the popularity of Spanish language music on a global level, while others credit her for being the pioneer, popularizing Spanish music and paving way for other artists such as Bad Bunny and Karol G who enjoy worldwide popularity today. She is credited with opening the doors of the international market for a new generation of Latin artists. The journalist Leila Cobo from Billboard said that Shakira "put Latin music on the map" and added that she "has been the top of Latin music".

Her impact is felt not only through her popularisation of Spanish music, but also through introducing the culture, rhythms, and musical heritage of the Latin community on a global stage. Throughout her career Shakira has been noted for introducing musical genres, instruments, and techniques from across Latin America, the Middle East, and other regions to a wider audience. Various media describe Shakira as an artist who makes Latin American culture visible in across the world and credit her for opening the doors of the international industry to Latinos.

Her legacy and impact have transcended language barriers, popularizing Latin music internationally, and being credited with catapulting Latin music to the international market. Various media outlets agree with popular opinion by naming Shakira as "The Greatest Female Latin Artist of All Time," highlighting her 30-year career and various achievements. She is considered a very influential artist for various artists from various communities. Due to her heritage as a Colombian of Lebanese descent, she is perceived as particularly influential for Latino and Middle-Eastern musicians. Shakira has also been credited as a very influential visual artist, music videos specifically have been named as a point of inspiration for various artists.

Forbes magazine has noted that Shakira's influence "knows no boundaries", whether in the fields of music or philanthropy. This is in reference to her work in early childhood education and advocacy for education as a birthright for all children. This work Shakira began at the age of 18 with the simultaneous release of her album Pies Descalzos and charity of the same name, the Barefoot Foundation in English. Her philanthropic efforts have projected her out of the realm of celebrity and into the space of a real influencer of change, working with various organisations and contributing to a number of initiatives to enact positive social change.

Shakira is one of the most influential musicians in the world and a keystone artist of the genres she has helped to popularize. The Guardian describes Shakira as "the most successful female Latin artist of all time". Shakira has achieved influence that transcends music and has wielded immense social and cultural impact. In 2021, Shakira was named by Kiss FM as one of the most influential female artists of the 21st century, highlighting her achievements in the international market without forgetting her Latin roots. In 2012, she was the youngest figure featured in literature covering "The 100 Greatest and Most Iconic Hispanic Artists of All Time".

== Global icon ==
Many Latino acts have benefitted from Shakira's departure from the 90s version of herself. By globalizing her music and brand, Shakira broke records and language barriers, allowing for younger artists like Bad Bunny and J Balvin to have their songs played on American radio. There were many figurative walls to destroy before songs composed by Latinos would be trendy enough for American audiences. Shakira is largely credited for breaking those walls.

— Jose Soto

Shakira's appearance on the international market was somewhat different from the other crossover artists such as Ricky Martin, Jennifer Lopez, Enrique Iglesias or Gloria Estefan, who already spoke fluent English. Shakira was a Spanish-speaking South American woman who had to learn English.

Shakira is noted to be a "global phenom" whose impact has "reached every corner of the world". The New York Times credited Shakira for the globalization of Latin music, and described her as the "21st century Latina bombshell." Published by the US Bureau of International Information Programs, the journal Global Issues (2006) cites Shakira as an example of a celebrity "in today's globalized world" who "made it big by sharing the uniqueness of their talent and culture with the global community." According to the official website of Colombia, she is credited as an "ambassador" for Colombia "across borders" with her "movements and unforgettable voice" that have "left a trace on every corner of the world."

In reference to Shakira's "blockbuster" popularity outside of the United States and United Kingdom, Live Nation has remarked that "Shakira's numbers outside the US are crazy stupid" Her popularity prompted Rolling Stone to dub her as "the most popular person on Earth." in 2014 Columnist, Erynn Ruiz considered Shakira "a trailblazer for women and artists all over the globe." El Correo del Golfo describes Shakira as an "artistic link between the west and the east" for popularizing Middle Eastern sounds in the West, and western sounds in the East (mainly the Middle East).

In 2021, it was revealed that "Shakira" is the most popular name derived from Latin or Arab musicians in the United Kingdom in the 21st century. The name ranks 8th overall among "UK's Most Popular Music-Inspired Baby Names."

=== In the Middle East and North Africa ===
Due to her popularity in the Arab world, Shakira is noted to have directly impacted Middle Eastern and North African popular culture. The book titled "The Cambridge Companion to Modern Arab Culture" by Dwight Reynolds (PhD), Professor of Arabic Language & Literature, by the Cambridge University Press, not only credits Shakira with introducing Middle Eastern rhythms and belly-dancing to the pop culture in the Americas and Europe but also points out the artist's impact on the Arab pop culture. The book names Lebanese singers Myriam Fares, and Nawal El Zoghbi to have echoed Shakira's sound and looks in the Middle East. Similarly, a publication titled Popular Culture in the Arab World: Arts, Politics, and the Media published by American University in Cairo Press further asserts Shakira's impact on popular culture in the Arab world. Author Andrew Hammond credits the Colombian artist for impacting and shifting the images of Arab pop stars such as Moroccan Samira Said and Lebanese Nawal Al Zoghbi. Asserting the impact he writes, "[they] have shifted their image and sound in an attempt to follow in her (Shakira's) footsteps".

=== In India ===
Shakira's multicultural approach of including ethnic dances in her music has allowed her to be a household name in India. Many Indian artists have shown aspiration to follow the Colombian performer's steps in hip-shaking. Many claim that Shakira has popularized belly-dancing in India in the early 2000s. The country and the subcontinent have multiple songs and movies revolving around Shakira. Some of Shakira's biggest hits are remade and translated and used in movies, one example could be Indian composer Anand Raj Anand's remake of the song "Ojos Así" to "Yeh Pyaar Hai" for a Bollywood movie. On 25 March 2007, Shakira finally performed for Indian fans in Mumbai, Maharashtra, at the MMRDA Grounds as a stop during her world tour.

== Latin music ==
Shakira is a pioneer who has redefined the scope of Latin American singers and has become one of the most intriguing voices in Latin pop/rock today.

— Dana Rodriguez, BMI Foundation

Shakira is mostly credited for bringing Latin music to the entire planet by herself, something that only a few artists had achieved, however, Shakira took it to a greater level. She is considered the world's most popular Latin artist, dominating multiple spots on the downloads charts in Finland, Germany, Switzerland, China, and over 35 countries. A survey concluded that Shakira dominates the global reach of Latin music. A 2021 survey conducted by LATFEM, a Latin American feminist organization concluded that Shakira is the most influential female artist among Latin American females and the LGBT community. Also, Shakira's fourth studio album ¿Dónde Están los Ladrones? has come out as the most influential album within the surveyed population.

More than two decades later, it's hard to imagine what the modern pop landscape would be like without the Colombian superstar, especially considering the explosion in popularity other Latin artists have experienced after her.

— Hannah Dailey, Billboard

Szendro said, "...many girls were directly influenced by Shakira and I am that generation, in which I felt identified for the first time with someone at that level." The survey also adds, "with age comes the recognition and it becomes very easy to see the legacy and the deep impact that "Shaki" has left." Shakira's third studio album Pies Descalzos also made an appearance on the list. Her introduction of Latin music to mainstream media has been defined as one of her many "revolutionary industry acts." She has shown her Latin heritage to the entire world and this has influenced the sounds we hear today on the radio. According to Marie Claire Taiwan, "[Shakira] introduced Latin music to the international market, sparking a huge boom in Latin pop music in the mainstream English-speaking market and helping more Spanish-speaking singers enter the European and American markets." Likewise, Rolling Stone, Grammys and Billboard credit Shakira for opening doors and paving the way for the new generation of Latin music artists who would come after her. In countries like Germany, she was credited with causing a "musical boom" by increasing public interest in Latin music during 2003. Forbes magazine in a 2023 article credits her with breaking down barriers against new Latin artists in music, including names like Bad Bunny. During an interview with Shakira, Canadian announcer Tom Power expressed that "collaborative artists present on Shakira's album Las Mujeres Ya No Lloran would possibly not exist without Shakira. According to writer Isabela Raygoza for Billboard, Shakira is a pioneer in the exploration of Latin genres within pop music. According to Vogue, Shakira is a before and after for Latin American music.

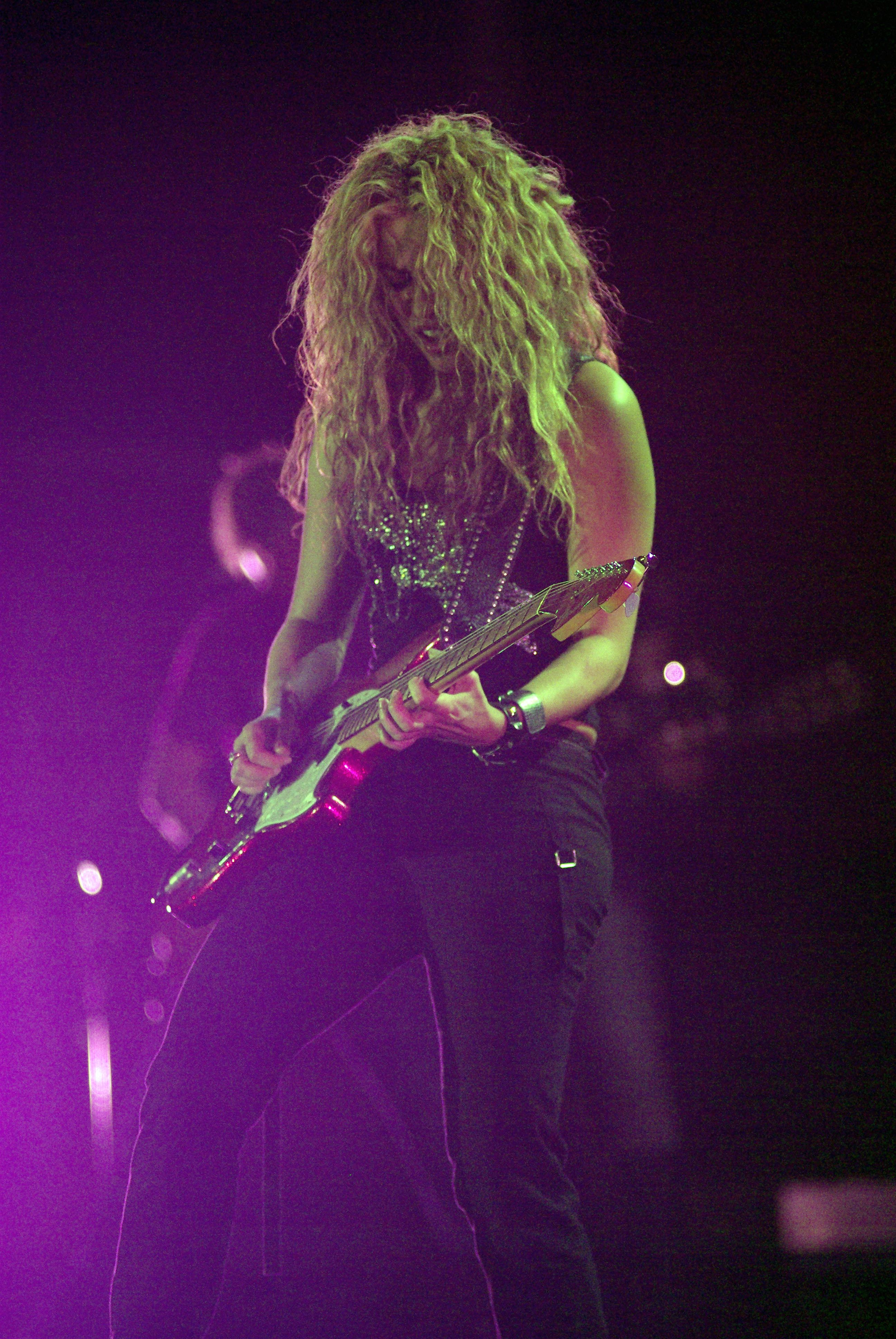
Shakira in playing the guitar while performing her 1998 rock classic Inevitable

=== Latin rock ===
Initially a rock musician in the 1990s, according to The New York Times, Shakira was regarded as the "innovator in Latin alternative rock." Rolling Stone's Leila Cabo has noted that Shakira in the 1990s with her album ¿Dónde Están los Ladrones? was "redefining the parameters" of Rock en español and bringing about the inclusion of women in the genre. Refinery 29 columnist Nicole Collazo Santana has credited the Colombian artist to have "laid out the foundation for Latina rockers.".

=== Latin pop ===
Generally, Shakira is credited for introducing Latin artists to pop music. The New York Times has named the Colombian artist "The Titan of Latin Pop" for her leading and outstanding output in the genre for more than three decades. A comparative statement between Shakira and her fellow Latin peers was made, calling the latter "polished" and contrasting Shakira's persona which is "raw and unpredictable. Political, abrupt, outspoken, and talented in every way." Public Broadcasting Service recognizes Shakira as one of the fuelers of the "Golden Age of Latin Music" which is credited to have reshaped America's cultural landscape for the twenty-first century". According to the media, Shakira gave "a new status" to pop in Spanish.

=== Reggaeton ===
The authors of Reggaeton, published by Duke University Press, have named the Barranquillera as an artist who popularized the genre (reggaeton) in North America, Europe, and Asia in the mid-2000s. Her song "La Tortura" was along with "La Gasolina" by Daddy Yankee the reggaeton songs that extended it to a much larger audience. It was also the first song entirely in Spanish featured on the MTV VMAs. According to journalist Juan de Dios Sánchez, thanks to the song "La Tortura" Shakira marked Hispanic music, adding that the commercial status that reggaeton enjoys today is due to the visibility that this genre achieved through Shakira's experiments and the commercial success she obtained with them crediting her for the creation of "Reggaetón-Pop" while highlighting the importance of Shakira's legacy in the genre saying that her fusion music with reggaeton works to guide the musical evolution of the genre as well as modulating machismo.

=== In the United States ===
"For a long time the prejudices, the people who handled the radios, the 'gatekeepers' kept the gates closed preserving what they believed had to sound on the radio. That was my turn, I had to face a very closed industry, very obtuse so when I started putting out music in English and I also kept putting out music in Spanish, but I kept mixing and making a fusion of rhythms from Colombian cumbia to Middle Eastern influences (...), wanting that to sound on Anglo-Saxon radio was really a challenge."

— Shakira, Andina (news agency)

Shakira is noted to have broken language barriers in the United States and had success both in English and Spanish music. In 1999 Shakira's MTV Unplugged became the program's first episode to be broadcast entirely in Spanish The concert is also noted to be the first time a Latin pop act attempted an Unplugged, as well as the first Latina solo act to do so. In 2001 Shakira's "Whenever, Wherever" music video was aired on MTV with both the English and Spanish versions. According to a spokesman for the channel, this is noted as "the first time that U.S. MTV has aired a Spanish-language video." In 2005, "La Tortura" became the first ever full Spanish-language music video to air on MTV without an English version. That same year, it also became the first ever Spanish song to be nominated and performed at the MTV Video Music Awards. The 2006 global smash hit "Hips Don't Lie" was selected as one of the greatest songs by 21st century female artists by US National Public Radio, ranked at number 65. The song's success has made the media point out that without its crossover, many Latin artists such as Karol G, Becky G, Bad Bunny, Maluma or J Balvin would not have the recognition that they enjoy today.

=== Impact on other Latin artists ===
Shakira frequently collaborates with other Latin artists throughout her career to introduce them to a wider audience. Sony Music chairman and CEO of Latin Iberia, Afo Verde hinted that Sony Music Latin paired Anuel AA with Shakira to expand Anuel's reach. In an interview with Billboard he expressed: "She [Shakira] is a cornerstone of our strategy to present powerful role models in Latin music to the international markets, he says of the Colombian singer-songwriter, citing her “remarkable international appeal." Another case is with the urban singer Maluma with whom they made their song "Chantaje" opening doors in the international market and granting him his first entry on the Billboard Hot 100 list. After collaborating with Shakira, Colombian singer, Carlos Vives acknowledged that Shakira's global popularity introduced the non-Latin market to his music. He said, "Shakira is so big that people in other markets learned about Carlos Vives." Shakira is seen as a Latina who pushes the reach of Latino artists on a global scale by demonstrating them to a global audience. According to the media, Shakira is credited with helping other Latin artists enter the international market.

== Latin culture ==
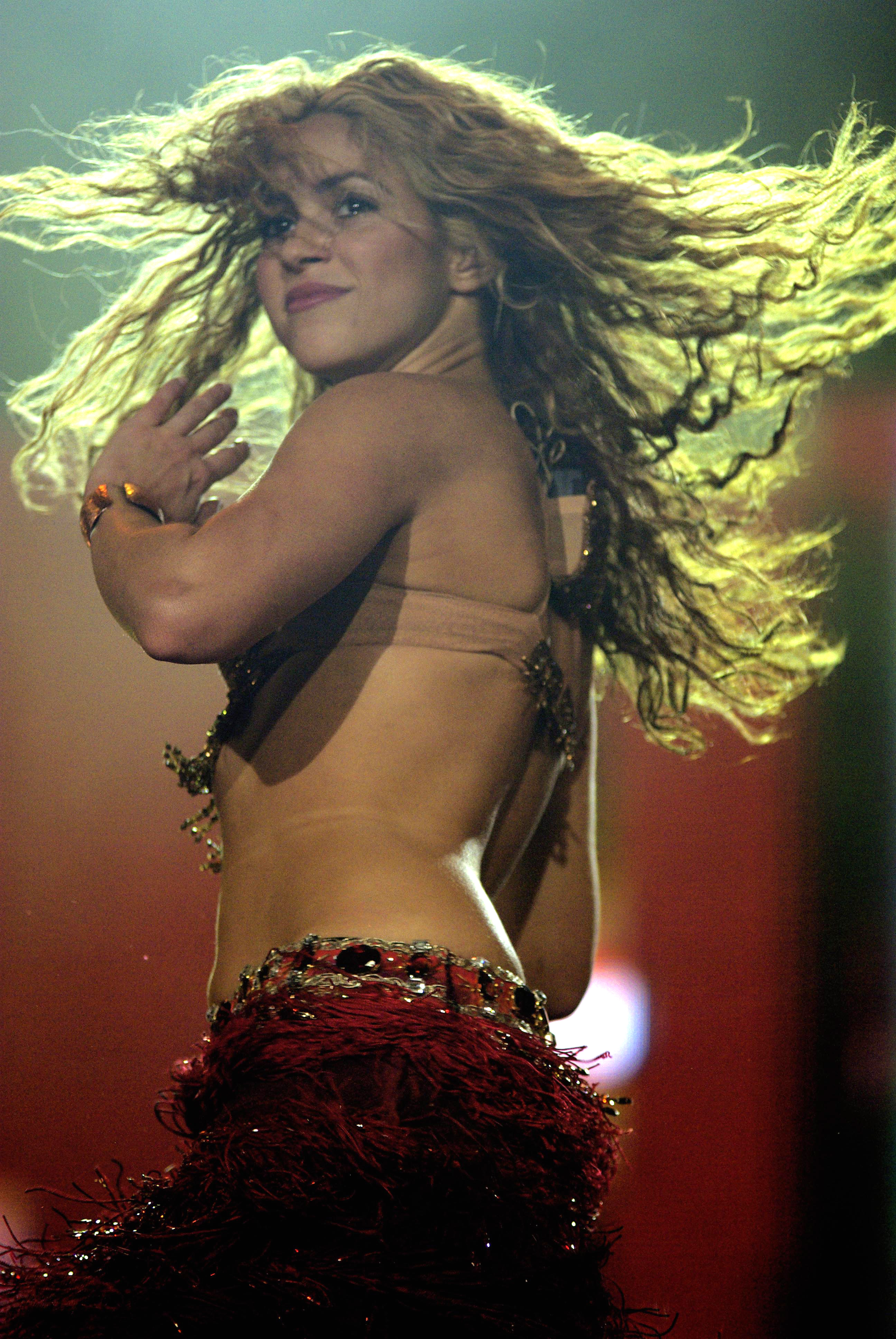
Shakira is considered one of the main references of Latin culture to the world.

In Latin studies, María Elena describes Shakira as an idealized transnational citizen. "Her music career and public persona ... occupies the interstices between the Latin American and US Latinos contained within the rubric of Latinidad, Cepeda goes on to note "her multiple subject position (as Lebanese-Colombian, Caribbean-Colombian, female, popular performer, and recent US migrant) contribute to a sense of Latins and Colombians both within and outside U.S borders", with her statements rejecting the tenets and aims of SB 1070, Shakira is also a great example of how a clearly politicized sense of Trinidad operates in defense of all Latinos deemed "illegal" in the eyes of the law. Books like "From Shahrukh to Shakira: Reflections on aesthetic cosmopolitanism among young French people" in which they tell us about the process of how young French people have been greatly influenced by other cultures, including Latin America, accrediting Shakira. In other books, it is expressed that within books that study the culture of countries such as France, Japan, China and many more from continents such as Africa, Europe, Asia and the Americas, Shakira is the only Latin artist who has the largest representation in Latin American culture. In communication studies, along with Latino studies, Latino identity is talked about and as stars like Shakira have helped redefine what it means to be a Latino in the eyes of other countries as well as Latinos feeling proud to celebrate their Latino heritage, the called "Latin explosion" Presided over by artists like Ricky Martin and her, they managed to get Latinos to enter the mainstream market of the world making the community in different countries on several continents, especially in the US, look much more united with the Latino community.

== Fame ==
Various media outlets recognize Shakira as a world-class celebrity who covers different fields besides music such as politics and philanthropy with influence in situations of support to communities.

Her fame began with her first international album Pies Descalzos which catapulted her into the Latin market very immediately after two failures with "Magia" and "Peligro", Shakira was quickly cataloged offensively as "the second largest export from Colombia" however in several countries such as Brazil, Peru, Colombia, Mexico, Argentina and more she was seen as a nascent musical phenomenon calling her as "the greatest Latin artist that Latin America has been able to offer", being invited to all type of interviews questioning her about her lyrics and sounds, thanks to her second album ¿Dónde Están los Ladrones? Shakira did nothing but increase the curiosity of the Latin public about her and her sounds by fusing the Lebanese culture with her Latin origin. Sales were a complete success during the nineties, selling just over 10 million records in Latin America alone until 2001, more than artists already established in the industry.

=== Cultural effect ===
Once with the success of her international debut album Shakira was called as a sensation in all of Latin America, her success was such that her public image of that time as a rock girl became a trend in several young Latinas in the words of her peers in the artistic medium like Carlos Vives, who expressed that Shakira was an image that several Latinos felt represented with her and even everyone wanted to be like her. Her appearance in the artistic world was seen as something new discovered that until then had not been seen in Latin America and the media in Latin countries called "Shakira Fever" because of the large number of young people who attended her concerts, they dressed in coin belts emulating Shakira. With Pies Descalzos Shakira not only became a new benchmark for musical entertainment, but also the spokesperson for what a part of the youth of the 90s felt and wanted to express. Shakira was credited with putting Colombian music on the map of the international market, attracting the attention of several countries outside the territory as well as according to national magazines. Thanks to her music, Shakira opened a new door for women in the industry and showed many "scholars" that a 1.57-meter girl could become a superhero for men and women, despite the fact that female artists always had them in the background.

== In popular culture ==
=== Natural and social sciences ===
- Aleiodes shakirae : Type of wasp named after Shakira because the movement of this insect's abdomen is similar to Shakira's belly dancing style.
- In 2025, a newly discovered fossil turtle species was named Shakiremys colombiana in honor of the singer.

=== Theater ===
- (2019) The musical Las de la Intuición is a comedy based on Shakira's greatest hits, written and directed by Yefry Lemus.

=== Comics ===
- (2011) Dora the Explorer: Shakira appeared in the comic alongside the character of Dora.
- (2024) Female Force, comic series from Tidalwave Productions.

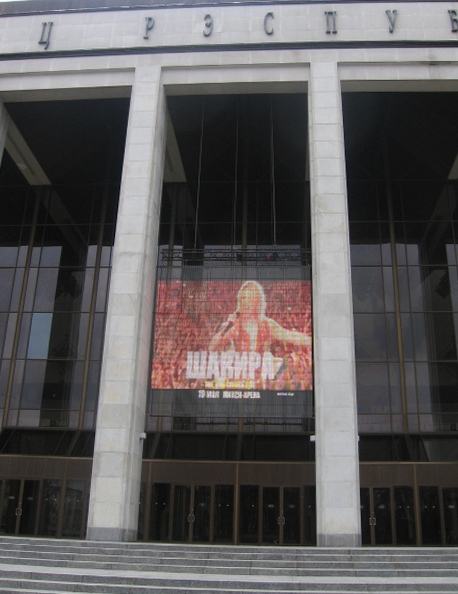
Shakira's 2011 "Sale el Sol World Tour" poster outside the concert hall in Minsk, Belarus

=== Gastronomy ===
- (2020) A Shakira-inspired restaurant called Chickira opened in Egypt.
- (2013) A restaurant called Shakira Kebab has opened in the country of Italy.
- (2016) Ice cream shop La Martiniere in France launched a Shakira-inspired ice cream flavor.

=== Internet ===
- (2002) A virus called Shakira.chn appeared on the Internet.
- (2014) Hackers used a virus with the name of Shakira to spread it throughout Latin America. The virus message claimed that the singer had died in a traffic accident.
- (2020) The tongue-trill Shakira performed during her Super Bowl LIV halftime show became viral as a meme. It was later revealed that the wavering, high-pitched sound was a zaghrouta.

=== Literature ===
- Ximena Diego: Shakira "Woman full of grace" (2001)
- Wilson Wayne: Shakira (2002)
- Zella William: Shakira Star Singer (2011)
- Sandoval Reyes: Shakira: Así es su vida (2012)
- Laura Corpa: Shakira: Pure Intuition (2011)
- María Sánchez: Shakira : Lo que nadie conoce (2006)
- Sarah Tieck: Shakira : International music star (2015)
- Thomas Tolbiac: Shakira : La star au grand coeur (2007)
- Arnaud Babion: Shakira : la bomba Latina (2007)
- Phil Rando: Shakira, l'ange de Colombie (2003)

Books that Reference Shakira

- Shakira is mentioned in the queer romance book "How We Named The Stars" by Andrés N. Ordorica. First US Edition, page 170. (2024)

=== Video games ===
- In Angry Birds Pop, a character appears with Shakira's characteristic traits.

=== Art ===
==== Paintings ====
- The painter Rafael Barón made a painting based on Shakira's song "Te Espero Sentada" from her album "Pies Descalzos"

==== Exhibitions ====
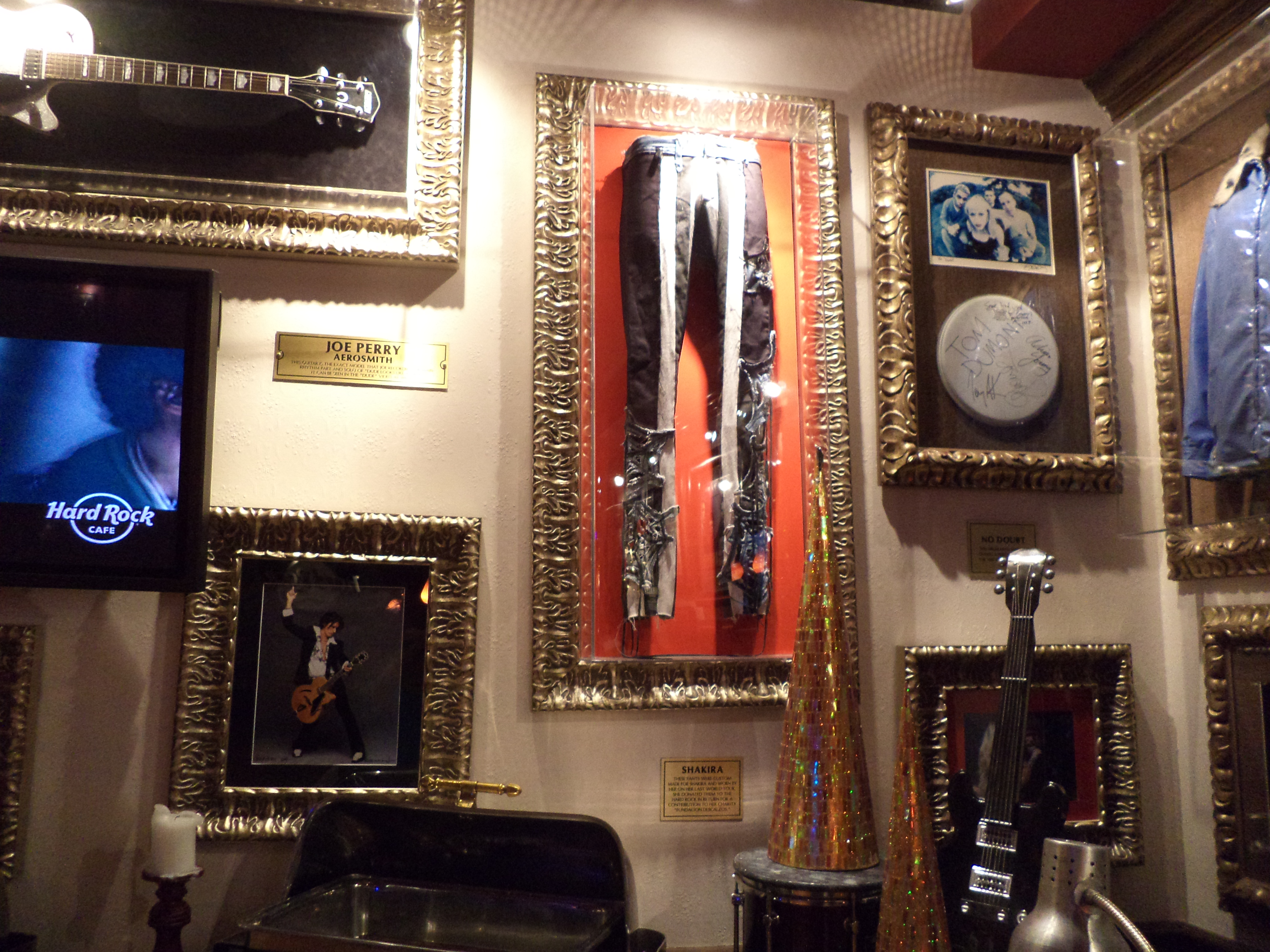
Shakira pants displayed at the Hard Rock Cafe in Atlanta

- Hard Rock Cafe

In various places of the Hard Rock Cafe various garments of the singer are exposed.

- National Museum of Women in the Arts

Shakira's wardrobe was presented at the National Museum of Women in the Arts in the exhibition women who rock

==== Movies ====
- Shakira is referenced in Captain America: The Winter Soldier (2014), the second installment of the franchise. After spending several decades under a block of ice, Steve Rogers has a lot of catching up to do when it comes to pop culture and cultural milestones. He keeps a checklist filled with recommendations to get him up to speed. In the Latin American Spanish dubbed version of the movie, Shakira's name can be seen as part of his to-do list.

==== TV Shows ====
Shakira has been referenced in many TV Shows, including:

- The Simpsons - S8.E14: The Itchy & Scratchy & Poochie Show (1997). Note: Shakira is mentioned in the Latin American Spanish dubbed version.
- The Simpsons - S14.E22: Moe Baby Blues (2003). Note: Shakira is mentioned in the Latin American Spanish dubbed version.
- Family Guy - S6.E5: Lois Kills Stewie (2007). Note: Shakira appears in the DVD version during the song "I've Got a Little List," which was cut from the episode that aired on TV.
- Hannah Montana - S3.E2: Ready, Set, Don't Drive (2008).
- Modern Family - S11.E14: Spuds (2020).
- Sex Education - S2.E2: Episode 2 (2020).
- Orange is the New Black - S4.E2: Power Suit (2016).
- On My Block - S4.E8: Chapter Thirty-Six (2021).

==== Music ====
Shakira has been mentioned many times in other artists' songs, including:

- "Sensualidad" by Puerto Rican rapper Bad Bunny, American singer Prince Royce, and Colombian singer J Balvin (2017)
- "La Mentira" by Spanish singer Dani Martín (2019)
- "El Booty" by Cuban reggaeton singer Jacob Forever (2019)
- "Kellemetlen" by Hungarian hip-hop band AK26 (2020)
- "Sigo Buscándote" by Venezuelan Latin pop and reggaetón duo Mau y Ricky (2020)
- "Todas Mías" by Puerto Rican rapper Álvaro Díaz (2020)
- "Tá com o Papato" by Brazilian singer Anitta (2020)
- "Se Desvive Por Ella" by Puerto Rican reggaeton singers La Sista and Darkiel, and Puerto Rican rappers Miky Woodz and Pusho (2020)
- "Perreo Intenso" by Puerto Rican singers Farruko, Guaynaa, and Ankhal, featuring Kevvo (2020)
- "Shakira" by German rapper Kalazh44 and Lebanese-German rapper Samra (2020)
- "What's Poppin Freestyle" by American rapper, singer, songwriter, and actor Machine Gun Kelly (2020)
- "DanceFreak" by Puerto Rican duo Domino Saints (2022)
- "Más Rica Que Ayer" by Puerto Rican Rapper Anuel AA (2023)
- "Taxi Sulla Luna" by Italian rapper Tony Effe and Italian pop singer Emma Marrone, from Effe's album Icon (2023)
- "Solta-te by Brazilian singer-songwriter Pocah and Colombian Latin pop group Piso 21 (2023)
- "Guilty Conscience 2" by American rapper Eminem, from his album The Death of Slim Shady (Coup de Grâce) (2024)
- "Booty Killa" by Colombian singer, rapper and songwriter Fariana (2024)

== In Latin popular culture ==
=== Image trends ===
During the mid-90s, Shakira was already making herself known in the world of Latin music and some parts of Europe thanks to her successful international debut album "Pies Descalzos". According to Edgar Garcia in the book "Shakira ¡Que viva Colombia!" Shakira had reached a status of importance in Latin adolescents, which led to the appearance of various "impersonators" who emulated her look, voice, movements and characteristics. She used a look described by various media as "Rocker", leather pants, bracelets, and quite prominent hair, it was a sensation in America in countries like Spain, Turkey and Latin countries like Mexico and Argentina, Shakira's style had become a daily fashion for girls and adolescents emulating the singer during her look used in her "¿Dónde Están los Ladrones?" era, they wore the thread bracelets and the braids of Colors, they loved that hippie look of the new century and they identified with the sounds that Shakira embodied in her albums. Shakira came to have different imitators around the end of the 90's and the beginning of the decade 2000.

Carlos Vives said: "You will see that there are curramberas of all ages and there are Shakiras of all ages, who knew what they were doing there, the happiness with which they did it, with which they represented you, they all wanted to be you."

— La Prensa Redaction, La Prensa

=== Influences ===
==== Shakira's influence on Latin artists ====
From her debut to the present Shakira has been commonly cited as a source of inspiration for a wide variety of Latin and non-Latin artists, her music videos have been taken as inspiration for artists such as the singers Tini and Greeicy who was inspired by the video of the song "La Tortura" for their music videos "Ella Dice" and "Lejos Conmigo", and in several cases Shakira inspires for her lyrics, multicultural sounds and as a sign of how a Latino can be successful in international territory where racism continues to exist. Latin artists like Natti Natasha, Rosalía, Belinda, Greeicy Rendón, Natalia Lafourcade, Dulce María, Francisca Valenzuela, Anitta, Farina show their admiration and name her as a woman who inspires them, making them trust their own talent to succeed in an industry where they should not be afraid to write nor sing about their feelings, strengths, fears and experiences to stand out where men still predominate. Her music videos have redefined dance in these according to Billboard's words. And her sounds, mixing Latin rhythms with touches of pop music, have inspired artists with Latin roots such as Camila Cabello and Selena Gomez, who launched their projects in Spanish, always using their culture in their projects.

==== "Shakira" as a nickname for female artists ====
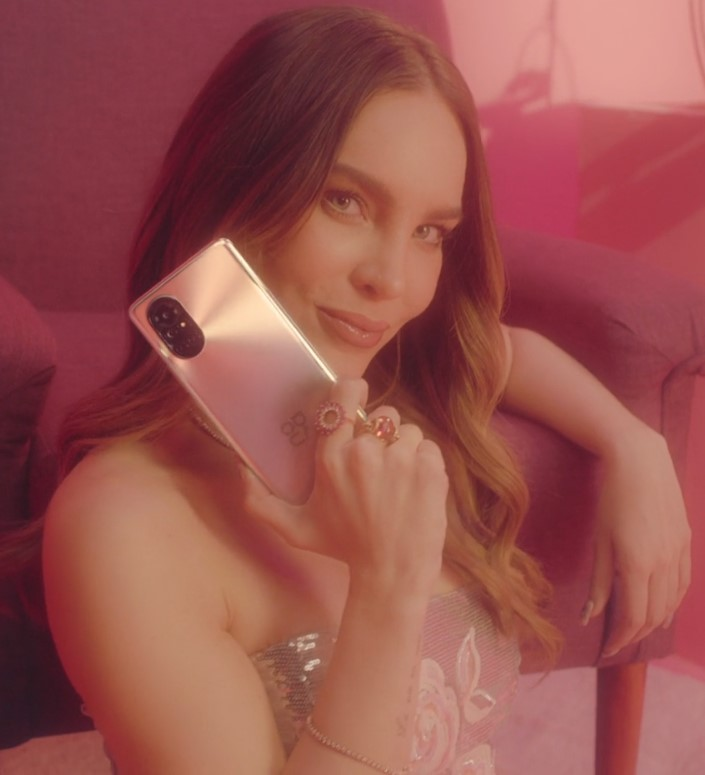
Artists like Belinda have often been referred to by the media and the public as "The Next Shakira."

The name Shakira is used by magazines, newspapers, and editors to refer to a Latin artist who has a success similar to what Shakira had at the time, she is considered the female standard of the Latin industry thanks to her almost unmatched success in the world, several emerging Latin artists are compared to her, female artists from Latin countries such as Anitta, Karol G, Lele Pons, Wendy Sulca, Belinda, Paty Cantú, Rosalía, Anahí and others are seen and they themselves express being aspiring to her, which leads them to be called with the title of "The new Shakira" or "The next Shakira". Artists like Ale have expressed to the press in their country that they want to be the next Shakira in the world or the same media are looking for a representative like Shakira, as in the case of the singer Marre who expresses wanting to become a superstar to a Latin singer there are those who they consider as the next to cross the door that Shakira opened many years ago. However different Latin artists have refused to be named as such, such as the singer Emmy Rosum who expressed not wanting to become a kind of Shakira in the market, a similar case was the case of Natalia Oreiro who expressed not wanting to be another Shakira promoting her career inversely to how the Colombian singer did. Indonesian artist Anggun was named as "Indonesian Shakira".

===== Selected List =====
Title (Note: Rarely figured as Madonna's answer to a specific nation or genre. Also as the "local version".)	Individual(s)	Country	Ref(s).
"Iberican Shakira"	Lola Índigo	Spain	
"Paraguayan Shakira"	Lorena Martinez	Paraguay	
"Indian Shakira"	Neha Kakkar	India	
"The Shakira of the Middle East"	Helly Luv	Iran	
"Indonesian Shakira"	Anggun	Indonesia	
"Brazilian Shakira"	Anitta	Brazil	
"Egyptian Shakira"	Suha Mohammed Ali	Egypt	
"Japanese Shakira"	Dream Ami	Japan	

=== Shakiramanía ===
The so-called Shakiramanía was noticed in various Latin countries with girls and young people who dressed and sang just like Shakira, wore clothes and accessories with her image, this generated a trend during the late 90's, this also called "Shakira Fever" reached a great fan base of all kinds both men and women who emulated the singer. During the arrival of the "Oral Fixation World Tour" concert in countries like Peru, various newscasts referred to the large number of fans as "a great Shakiramanía". Venezuelan channel RCTV made a 24-hour television special of videos about Shakira calling it "Shakiramanía".

== Discography impact ==
=== Pies Descalzos ===
Pies Descalzos was the first international album that Shakira released after the commercial failures Magia and Peligro and is considered one of the most important Spanish albums of all time in which Latin music was revitalized during the 90's and she also became the biggest Latin female star in various countries like Brazil, Colombia, Peru, United States and Japan. Her success was such that it broke attendance records in Brazil being compared to the shows offered by Michael Jackson in that territory. Several contemporary music critics spoke of how the album "convinced the audience" and helped establish Shakira as a professional artist. From the beginning of her career, Shakira was compared to Canadian Alanis Morissette, MTV's Bruno Delgranado and Sony Music's Luana Pagari declared that "the Colombian has strength in her voice, a sharp tone that rises easily and a charisma that makes her big on stage" and declared that Shakira was "not a one-day phenomenon". "Pies Descalzos" is part of the list of "100 albums you must have before the end of the world", published in 2012 by Sony Music.

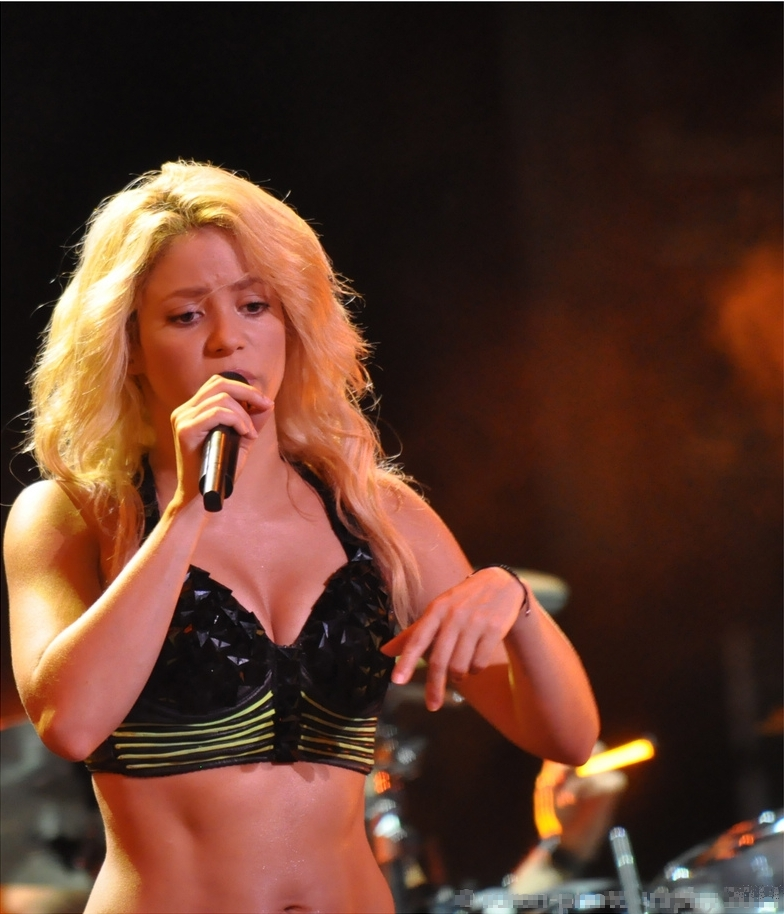
Shakira's discography (especially her first albums) had an impact on the Latin public.

=== ¿Dónde Están los Ladrones? ===
¿Dónde Están los Ladrones? It was Shakira's fourth album released in 1998, it is considered Shakira's best album, one of the best albums of Latin music and rock in Spanish. It is seen as the album that had the most impact on several emerging female artists of those times, inspiring them to compose just as Shakira changed the rules of Latin rock thanks to this album, recovering the genre for women and laying the foundations for Latin rockers. In 2020, Rolling Stone magazine placed the album on its list "The 500 Greatest Albums Of All Time" being the only rock album in Spanish to appear. The album led Shakira to be baptized by Time magazine as "The princess of rock" and to be described as "The Colombian Artist of the millennium" in her country. It was also considered the most influential album among women and the LGBT community according to a survey. For Juan Carlos Piedrahita, music editor of El Espectador in Colombia, with this album Shakira began to consolidate the sound that made her recognized throughout the world; "This album is a new starting point because with ¿Dónde Están los Ladrones? the MTV network opens the doors of its channel to her to rotate her music and make an Unplugged album to demonstrate her power live, something that had not happened with almost any Colombian artist". In the 90s, that artist who was chosen to make an episode of Unplugged for MTV was synonymous with artistic excellence and this gave a new status to her career. Before Shakira, names like Maná, Soda Stereo, Charly García and Café Tacvba, with several years of experience, were chosen for this project. Shakira's Unplugged, which featured 95% of the songs from ¿Dónde Están Los Ladrones?, was considered as historic because it became the first recording in Spanish to be broadcast on MTV in the United States and MTV in Europe. This fact in music became a milestone for its global artistic, cultural, and commercial impact, and it transcended time for what is considered this album with the songs of ¿Dónde Están Los Ladrones? as a work of art of Latin music. In media words thanks to what the woman from Barranquilla began to communicate with her sound and lyrics on her hands-on album, no one could take their eyes off her and that's when Colombia realized that it had a universal artist among them. The impact that this singer began to generate was such that her concerts were sold out months in advance, her albums sold millions of copies, thousands of letters from her fans arrived at her residences, her look of colored braids became popular. Throughout the continent, the choirs of her songs sounded in children's toys and, to words of the media the most important, she brought music in Spanish to audiences with cultures totally opposed to the Latinoamerican, such as Brazilians, Europeans, Africans and Asiatic.

=== Laundry Service ===
When the Latin explosion appeared in the industry, artists like Shakira released their albums, obtaining success in the world, selling 8 million in a year of its release and having more than 13 million sales to date, catapulting several Latin sounds such as tango or folk sounds around the world with her songs. Shakira was a success being compared to artists of the stature of Madonna, Britney Spears, and many more. She was also part of the cover of Rolling Stone "Women in Rock" with Mary J. Blige and Britney. Its success is seen as a breakthrough for the Latin market as it helped more South American artists have an easier opportunity to break into the US and world markets. In 2007 the album was included in the Rock and Roll Hall of Fame's 200 definitive albums of all time. Laundry Service is considered the album that paved the way for several Latin stars who followed Shakira with their sounds.

== Female representation ==
Shakira is believed to have broken the gender barriers in the Latin music industry which is considered to be "historically male-dominated" and passed their numbers. A fact that helps girls like her to have the same opportunities as her. Nicole Collazo Santana has mentioned that "Shakira reclaimed the male-dominated genre (pop rock) with music, turned the form into her diary, and gave it to us as a little annotated guide to navigate machismo in all the places we find it in the world." Likewise, Shakira herself explained that her 2009 album "She Wolf was made for all those who have desires that they repress, in the album she expresses how people need to free themselves from all the restrictions that society imposes on them. Adding "My biggest motivation was to make an album that people could just have fun with and forget about their troubles. Dance-oriented. Club-oriented. I want people to have fun with it. Forget about the troubles. Forget about the crisis Forget everything for a minute- at least while they listen to the music." The vice president of MTV explained that in the industry, women are mostly interpreters in the vast majority of times, Shakira is not the case since she is involved in the composition and production of her albums. Shakira from the beginning was seen as an artist who inspires Latino men and women to be proud of their roots, she managed to break down several barriers against the Latino community and facilitated the famous "crossover" to the mainstream market. Several artists such as Danna Paola, Manuel Turizo, Bizarrap, among others refer to Shakira as "the greatest female Latin artist in history".

== Crossover ==
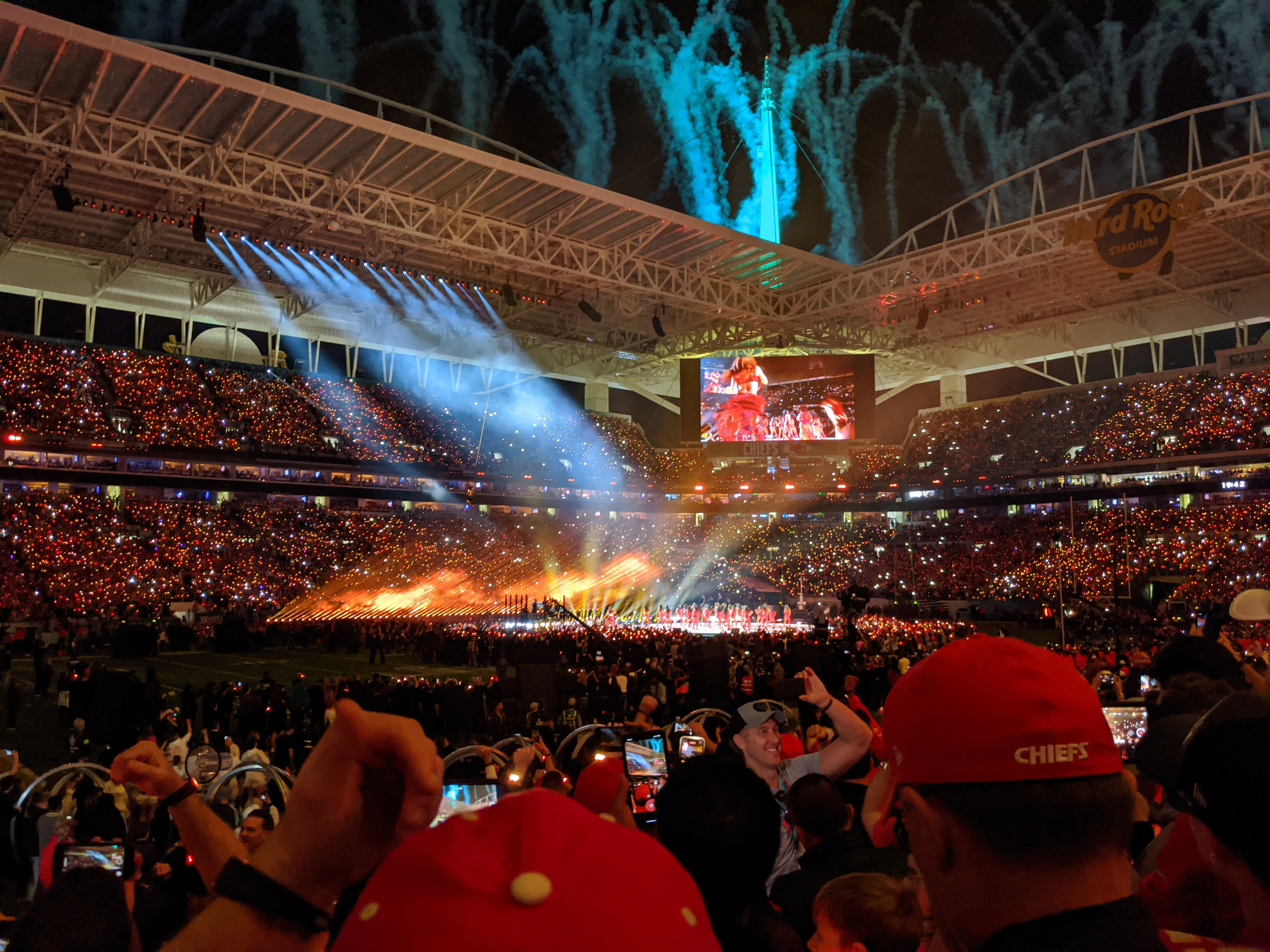
Shakira performing the song "Whenever Wherever" at the 2020 Super Bowl halftime show

Shakira’s early foresight in blending Spanish and English within her music paved the way for today’s artists, who now benefit from the doors she helped to open. Reflecting on the music industry today, superstars like Bad Bunny, J Balvin and Karol G navigate high-profile careers entirely in Spanish, a testament to how far the industry has evolved from the days when bilingual or English-language offerings were deemed necessary for true crossover success.

— Isabela Raygoza, Billboard, 2024'

Shakira's most notable and impactful career move has been her unprecedented crossover success. Shakira's success was a reason for other Latin American artists to attempt crossing over to the American market, one example is Mexican pop star Paulina Rubio. MTV asserts that "there's no question that Shakira opened doors in this country for artists like Rubio to succeed." According to Emilio Estefan, he was convinced that the album would be "the biggest crossover made in the history of music. Similarly Spin credits Shakira to have paved the way for other Latin artists to crossover, naming names like Maluma and J Balvin. It is seen that thanks to her album Laundry Service, Shakira was able to forge a path by which several futures Latin artists would follow to reach the international market in a not so complicated way After Shakira's Laundry Service, the history of music changed or at least how Latinos were represented. Other artists tried to do the same as her such as Fey, Paulina Rubio, Mónica Naranjo and Thalía, although it was not the same magnitude this showed that not only artists who speak English can be successful. Noting that thanks to Shakira, Latino artists now have a greater space in the international music industry in which prejudice and even racism continue to exist. Thanks to the success of her pre-crossover albums, Shakira was seen as the biggest Latin star ever offered.

What tends to happen with Latin artists is that they tend to have one big English-language record or two and then they revert to making Spanish records... She (Shakira) does a very good job of managing to synergize those two careers. Shakira is competing against iconic female artists and completely standing on her own, but she also has a career in Spanish as well, so she's completely unique in that respect

— Rob Stringer, Billboard, 2009

Los Angeles Times has noted that Shakira has successfully made it possible to cross-back-over after a successful crossover. This had not been observed in Latin music. In the public's eyes, artists usually become stuck in their previous "selves" before crossing over and losing their initial fanbase/market. Shakira has made the idea of crossing back over to Latin music after commanding the international audience the fact that would inspire future generations.

== Lyricism ==
In a podcast breakdown of the "500 Greatest Albums of All Time" according to Rolling Stone magazine, critics claim that Shakira's fourth studio album; The "frank and witty lyrics about love and heartbreak from ¿Dónde Están Los Ladrones? Inspired a whole generation of women to write their own songs unapologetically," quoting female artists such as Jessie Reyes and Francisca Valenzuela who went directly influenced by it. Valenzuela explains: "" My way of writing and composing influenced a lot. I liked it a lot. I came across that album, it was an important reference point for all the music that I composed as a teenager and that in the end gave rise to my career. When I was older I discovered other singers, but as a girl that was something that caught my attention, seeing in those songs, insecurities, rages and envies, that verbose debauchery that I felt when I listened to other music in English, or of men or in Literature texts. Suddenly that album kind of left an important mark ". Shakira is the Latin artist with the best vocabulary in lyrics of all time and the fourth overall according to a study carried out on different stars of popular music by the organization "Cliqpod" with an average of 151 unique words per 1,000 words.

== Dance ==
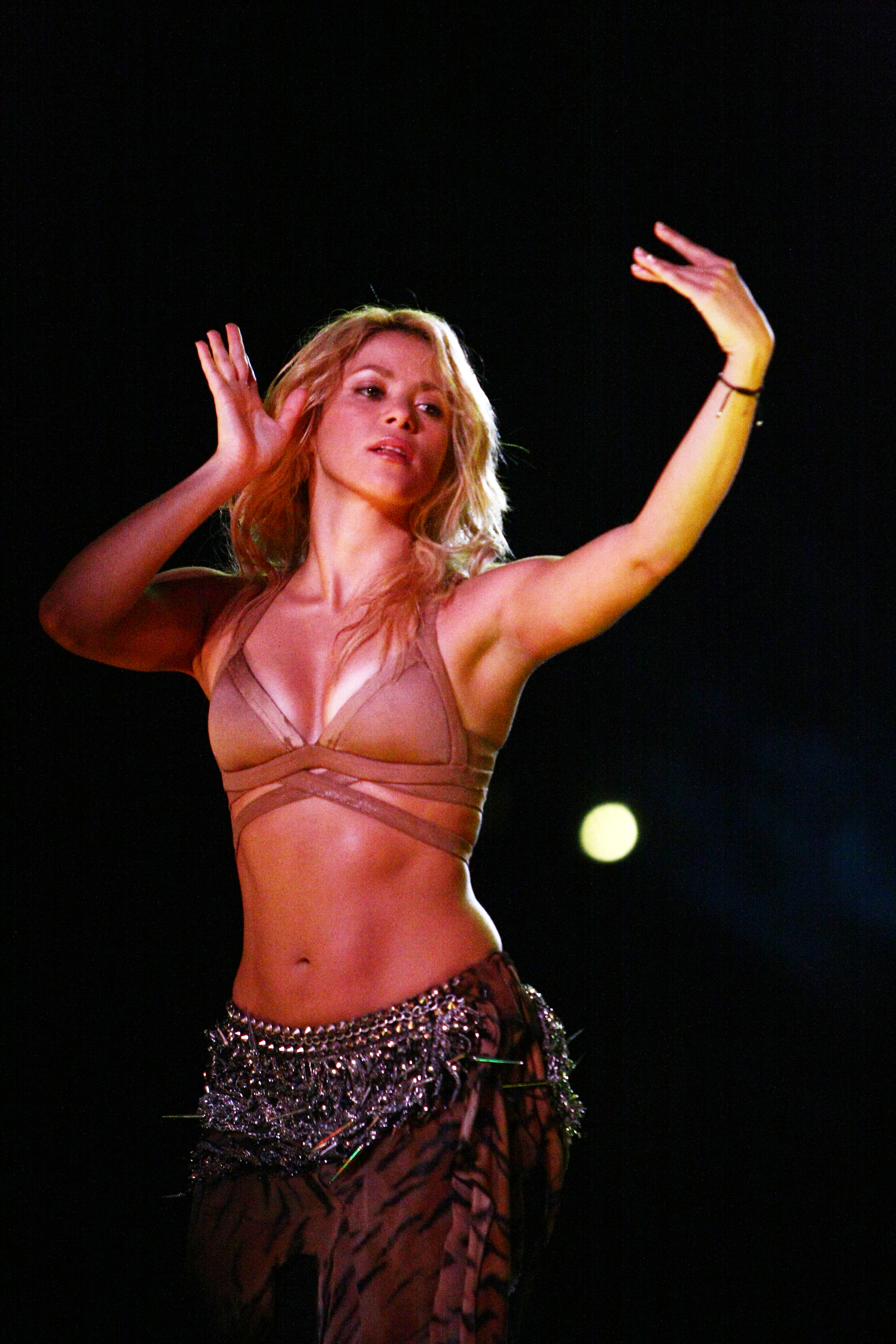
Shakira in 2011 wearing a bellydance attire

She (Shakira) came with the belly dancing era and everybody, like, in Washington Heights, in the Bronx, they wanted to be, like, belly dancers and everything...Even girls that don't speak Spanish, or they don't really know Spanish, they were just, like, belly dancing. It was just, like, a crazy era.

— Cardi B, Billboard, 2020'

I feel so grateful for her existence because she's put belly dance on the map in pop culture at a time where nobody even knew what belly dancing was in Western entertainment. So I really respect that, her fierceness, her sassiness, everything about that.

— Nora Fatehi, 2021

Shakira is noted to have a unique and distinctive dancing style, a combination of Latin dancing with Middle Eastern belly dancing, the latter is derived from her Lebanese heritage. Shakira is credited with popularizing belly dancing in popular culture, inspiring many young female artists. Her approach to dancing was much more influential compared to other artists' follow-the-leader style in dance. Shakira often uses her signature movements in music videos which has led for Billboard to credit her for having "redefined the role of dancing in music videos" while listing her as the best Latin female music video artist of all time. Her hip-shaking has become a cultural phenomenon which is mentioned in a handful of songs such as Fifth Harmony's "Brave Honest Beautiful", and Cardi B's Me Gusta. Her signature hip-shaking moves have become popular dance routines, classes, and contests in North America and the world, these classes and contests are often titled "Shake it like Shakira." The book titled "The Cambridge Companion to Modern Arab Culture" by Dwight Reynolds (PhD) Dwight Reynolds Professor of Arabic Language & Literature, by the Cambridge University Press notes that Cabaret performers in Cairo, Egypt have "copied" Shakira's sensational belly-dance looks which are often censored in the country. A publication titled "The Beauty Trade: Youth, Gender, and Fashion Globalization" published by the Oxford University Press by Angela B. McCracken credits Shakira to having popularized Arabian, Hawaiian, and Tahitian styles of dances which are often "body-centric" and have specific dance attires. According to the media, Shakira at the time of giving a presentation can compete side by side with expert dance artists such as Beyoncé, Madonna or Michael Jackson since she not only dances and sings, in her concerts they are an authentic audiovisual display that makes it an experience " of MTV Awards", noting that her dance brand "Belly Dance" can be compared to the famous Moonwalk.

=== Champeta ===
After the Halftime Show of the Super Bowl 2020, the Champeta dance that Shakira performed was a trend on networks like TikTok where it became popular under the name of Champeta Challenge with people from different parts of the world moving their feet to the rhythm of Shakira, thanks to this Disney was inspired to launch a series inspired by this Colombian dance, in the words of one of the actors in the cast: "After the Super Bowl, Shakira made it more popular and now Disney is doing this series for the world."

== Fashion ==
=== Latin fashion ===
At the beginning of her career, Shakira, like many Latin singers at that time, did not have much interest in fashion. According to Vogue España, Shakira's style during the 90's was described as "rocker with hints of metal." Vogue Mexico, described Shakira's early style as "unique" fashion that mixed the "urban" and "bucolic", highlighting both the ripped pants she used, as well as her cropped garments, which were often in her favorite shade, black. According to journalist Andrea Arzola, Shakira is considered one of the forerunners of the "Peep Toe" shoe trend, being one of the first to use them. According to journalist Amaia Odriozola of El País, Shakira managed to identify herself with a specific fashion trend by comparing it to Michael Jackson's white glove or Madonna's cone-shaped bras.

==== 1990 ====
Her looks often consisted of jackets, jeans, shirts, bare feet, and long black hair. Shakira dominated and imposed a trend with her used clothes for her look in youth, later the style used in her lead song from her album ¿Dónde Están los Ladrones? which is considered "traced the aesthetic coordinates of the future". According to the book "The Oxford Encyclopedia of Latinos and Latinas in the United States," Shakira managed to "introduce" another Latino fashion vocabulary with her low-rise leather jeans, leather tank top, and "unique" fashion.

==== 2000 ====
In later years, Shakira would show a great change in image with the release of her crossover album Laundry Service. Her hair was the most criticized and noticeable part of her stylistic change. Various people and some journalists criticized Shakira for wanting to "Americanize" and "fit in." with the other pop divas. Her wardrobe also gave a lot to talk about among Latin youth considered an authority in fashion, popularizing her characteristic style. She showed herself with a more punk-inclined wardrobe with garments made of leather and lace. This style would also be widely replicated at its base of fans and young Latinas and in the United States during the early 2000s, during her interview at a press conference for her first world tour Shakira was asked if she knew the impact she had with her tight-fitting clothing style. Tight thrift store pants, old shirts and funky hats have sparked a style revolution that has spread to youth around the world.

=== In popular culture ===
Several of her costumes that she has worn in videos have become viral costumes that girls and boys wear for events such as Halloween, birthdays, etc. Some of her most imitated outfits are those from her video "Las de la intuicion" with videos appearing on social networks of several teenagers dressed like the singer imitating her in her video. Other of her outfits from music videos that are imitated are those from "Monotonía", "Sesión 53" and "Te Felicito".

=== Middle Eastern fashion ===
Due to Shakira's popularization of belly dancing and its imagery around the globe, Arabian coin belts which are usually worn as a part of belly dancing attire are commonly referred to as "Shakira Belts." The naming is most common in Turkey "Shakira Kemeri". Coin belts were also referred to as "Shakira belts" by Egypt's adviser to minister of tourism which led to controversy in the country because the belts were already popular in the country before Shakira's use of them. The naming was viewed as a "marketing technique" by the Egyptian media. In 2004, Shakira's use of different belts often inspired by different cultures revived the production and trend of belts in the fashion industry.

The name Fusion Fashion is a name given to a new trend in fashion in the 2000s that Shakira is credited with introducing due to her distinctive Latin and Middle Eastern aesthetic. Also, thanks to the fusion of aesthetics, it generated a great impact in Middle Eastern countries where Shakira "opened the doors" for record labels like EMI to give several artists from countries like India the opportunity to work with them.

== Middle Eastern music visibility ==
Shakira is cited to have popularized Middle Eastern sounds in pop culture and the West. Her music is known to be a melange of her national Colombian, and Latin American sounds and her ethnic Middle Eastern music. Shakira is noted to have debunked a myth of belly dancing in Hollywood by de-sexualizing it. Usually, belly dancing in Western cultures is a mythologized idea of it being a promiscuous dance surrounded by men. Roxana Hadadi points out that Shakira usually dances alone in non-sexualized settings, and tends to bring forward the "communal attitude of this dance" which she describes it to be "very difficult." The Atlantic Council writes that Shakira's use of Arabian sounds in her music has led to many discussions on cultural diversity and the various cultures that have made America the place it is today.

On another note, western artists who make use of Middle Eastern sounds in their music are often compared to Shakira. One example is Celine Dion's "Eyes On Me", the song was heavily compared to Shakira's musical styling by critics, having Nick Levine from Digital Spy describing the styling choice as "Shakira territory."

== Colombian symbol ==
She is seen as something of a saint in her own country. There are statues to her. Writhing teens love her for putting Latin American dance-music around the world: nuns revere her for building schools for orphans..

— Euan Ferguson, The Guardian, 2009'

Next to an unfortunate popular link between Colombia and Drug lords, Coffee and Shakira remain rather positive links that popularize the country. In an article about Shakira, El Espectador, with the pen of Dagoberto Páramo Morales, equates Shakira to a "symbol of national identity." Further elaborating that Shakira has successfully managed to "...put Colombia at the top of the artistic world, making it known that Colombians are much more than the corrosive stereotypes with which they have wanted to identify us. We (Colombians) are joy, art, party, culture, sensuality." In an article on Esquire Isabella Garces similarly notes that Shakira unified Colombia and that she became a positive symbol instead of the negative association of the country with Pablo Escobar and drugs. Garces added, "Shakira fueled Colombia's pride. Journalists praised her, politicians saw her as a true example for her generation, and Colombia's national newspaper". In 2021, Shakira was awarded as the "image of Colombia to the world" by the Premios Nuestra Tierra. In late 90s, then president of Colombia, Andrés Pastrana hailed Shakira as an "Emblem of a New National Era" for bringing forth a rather positive image to the country despite its "violence-plagued" reality.

In 2011, Shakira became the first Colombian artist ever to receive a star on Hollywood Walk of Fame.

== Multiculturalism ==
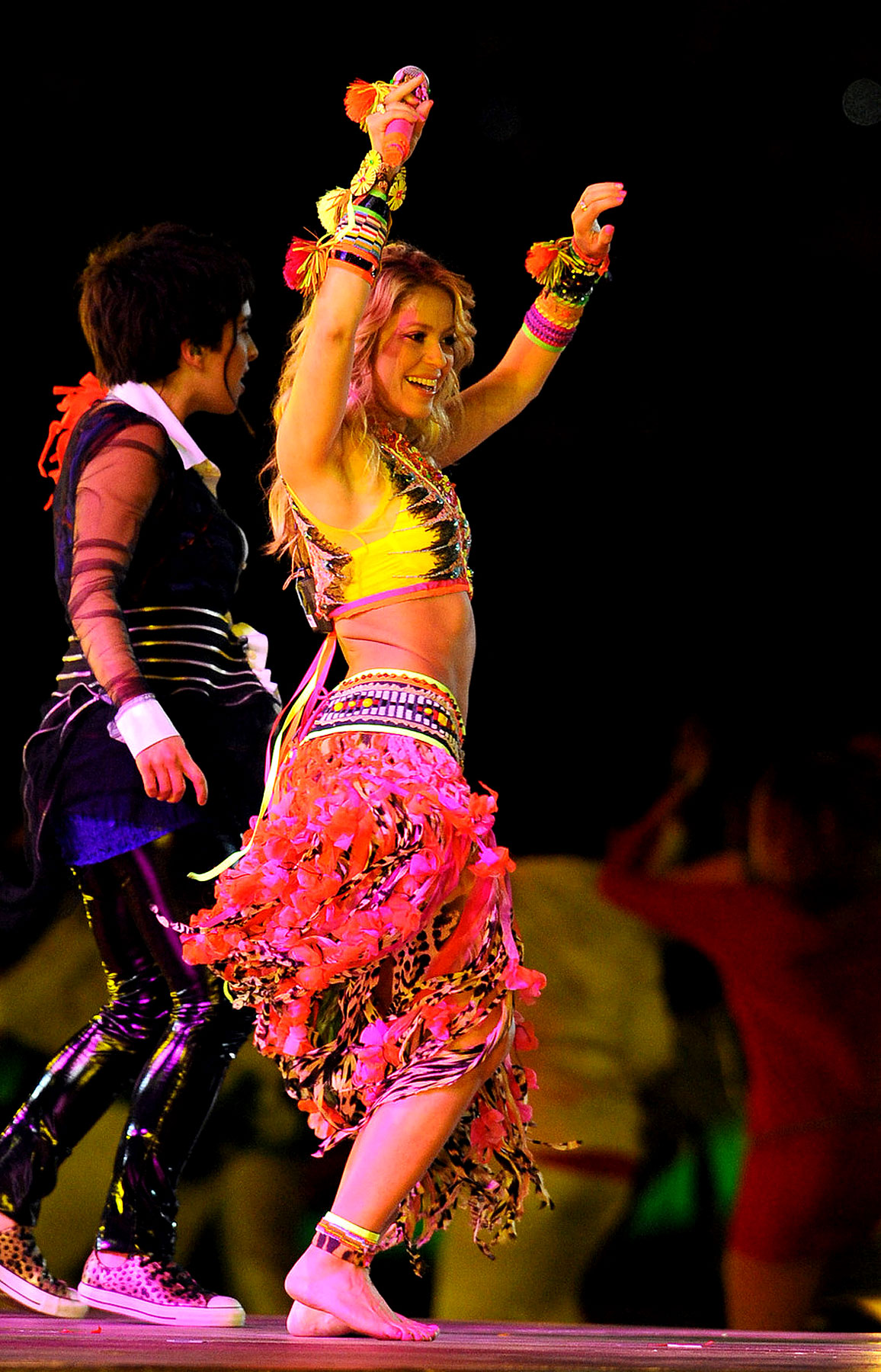
Shakira is admired by the media for her fusion of rhythms from various countries and cultures.

A key factor differentiating Shakira from other artists, which is also a trait considered to have impacted pop culture, is her multiculturalism. Her Latin identity fused with her Lebanese heritage has made a lasting impact in America. Her Cross-cultural approach in music has made her one of the few musicians to have a strong fan-base in all corners of the World. Culturs magazine notes that Shakira has a big and diverse fanbase in Latin America, United States, and places as odd as Saudi Arabia. Journalist Brook Farely with a background in ethnic studies wrote "She (Shakira) exposes her U.S. listeners to music that is influenced by different cultures other than their own... Shakira's music transcends cultural norms, and takes on a life and personality of its own." In a 2002 article, Bruce Britt from BMI Foundation wrote that Shakira's multicultural influences have helped Shakira to "shake up the pop world. He also added, "If a team of scientists were commissioned to build the perfect pop star, chances are the result would bear a striking resemblance to Colombian singing sensation Shakira."

== Impact on women ==
In an article about Shakira's not-so-typical pop star looks, Carolina Maldonado from Her Campus points out Shakira's impact on women and their image. Unlike most pop stars, and despite being "beautiful" and "fierce" Carolina says "Shakira rarely ever straightens her hair or wears makeup when she performs. She is usually not seen wearing heels or super over-the-top outfits. On stage, she is who she is and all of her performances are based on her talent. She doesn't need a bunch of lights, dancers, props, or even a crazy stage to draw and keep the attention of her audience. Her simple performances, in which she is usually barefoot, are a homage to the art of dance. It's just her and her microphone." This has impacted Latin women to rely on their talents and roots rather than looks.

== Impact on brands ==
According to Google Trends, after Shakira mentioned multiple brands in her 2023 hit, Shakira: Bzrp Music Sessions, Vol. 53's lyrics searches for Twingo and Casio reached five-year highs worldwide, with Launchmetrics data showing that during the first week of the song's release, Casio and Rolex gained $70 million and $40.5 million respectively in media exposure across print, online content, and social media. Spanish media dubbed the fiscal impact "El efecto Shakira"; also affecting Ferrari, this company saw its share value rise 2.08% due to the positive mention in the song, while Casio had a 1.87% decrease in value and Renault a 1.45% decrease, with both being mentioned negatively. It soon became noted that the Shakira effect, as a phenomenon of social influence, may have seen the stock values of the brands mentioned negatively decrease, but also saw the social value of the brands increase; social media insights firm Audiense showed that besides social media mentions dramatically increasing for Casio, many of these were positive, including some social media users discussing a nostalgic affection for the brand, provoked by the song. On 23 January, the marketing director of Casio said "thanks to "the Shakira effect," the sales have been spectacular... [and] intense. But the best thing is every day [sales] are much better than last year."

== Recognitions and titles ==
Appearing on multiple lists throughout her career, Shakira has been ranked by various music outlets as "The Greatest Latin Woman of All Time" in music history, based on her sales, cultural impact, legacy, and acclaim. Many critics agree on how she managed to break barriers to position herself on the biggest music charts as a Latin American artist at a time when racism and xenophobia were still strong in foreign territory while Latin rhythms were scarce on the radio. The multicultural magazine "Cultures" named her "The Greatest Latin Artist of All Time" citing all her achievements. As well as the magazine Rolling Stone stated that she was "The best-selling Latin woman in history" with 95 million copies sold to date.

List of recognitions and titles granted to Shakira
Year/Era	Publication	List of work	Ref
2023	Los 40	"The Most Significant Latin Artist of All Time"	
2022	Rolling Stone	"Best Selling Female Latin Artist of All Time"	
2021	Culturs	"The Greatest Latin Artist of All Time"	
2021	E!	"The Most Important Latin Artist of All Time"	
2021	The Guardian	"The Most Successful Female Latin Artist of All Time"	
2021	Vogue	"The Musical Legend"	
2021	The New York Times	"The Titan of Latin Pop"	
2021	Stacker	"The Most Influential Latin Woman of The 21st Century"	
2020	Billboard	"The Best Latin Female Music Video Artist of All Time"	
2024	Billboard	"The Most Successful Female Latin Artist of All Time"	
2024	Billboard	"The #17 Greatest Pop Star of the 21st Century"	
2020	Pitchfork	"Latin America's Pop Queen"	
2020	Pollstar	"The highest-grossing Latina female artist of the 21st century"	
2020	ET	"One of The Most Influential Artists of The 21st Century"	
2017	Time	"The Pop Legend"	
2014	Rolling Stone	"The Most Popular Person On Earth"	
2012	VH1	"The greatest Latin Woman in Music"	
2012	The Sun	"The Latin Woman Who Will Never Be Forgotten in History"	
2011	BBC News	"The Queen of Latin Music"	
2005	The Economist	"The Crossover Queen"	
2002	Rolling Stone	"The Biggest Rock Star in Latin America"	

== Academic study ==
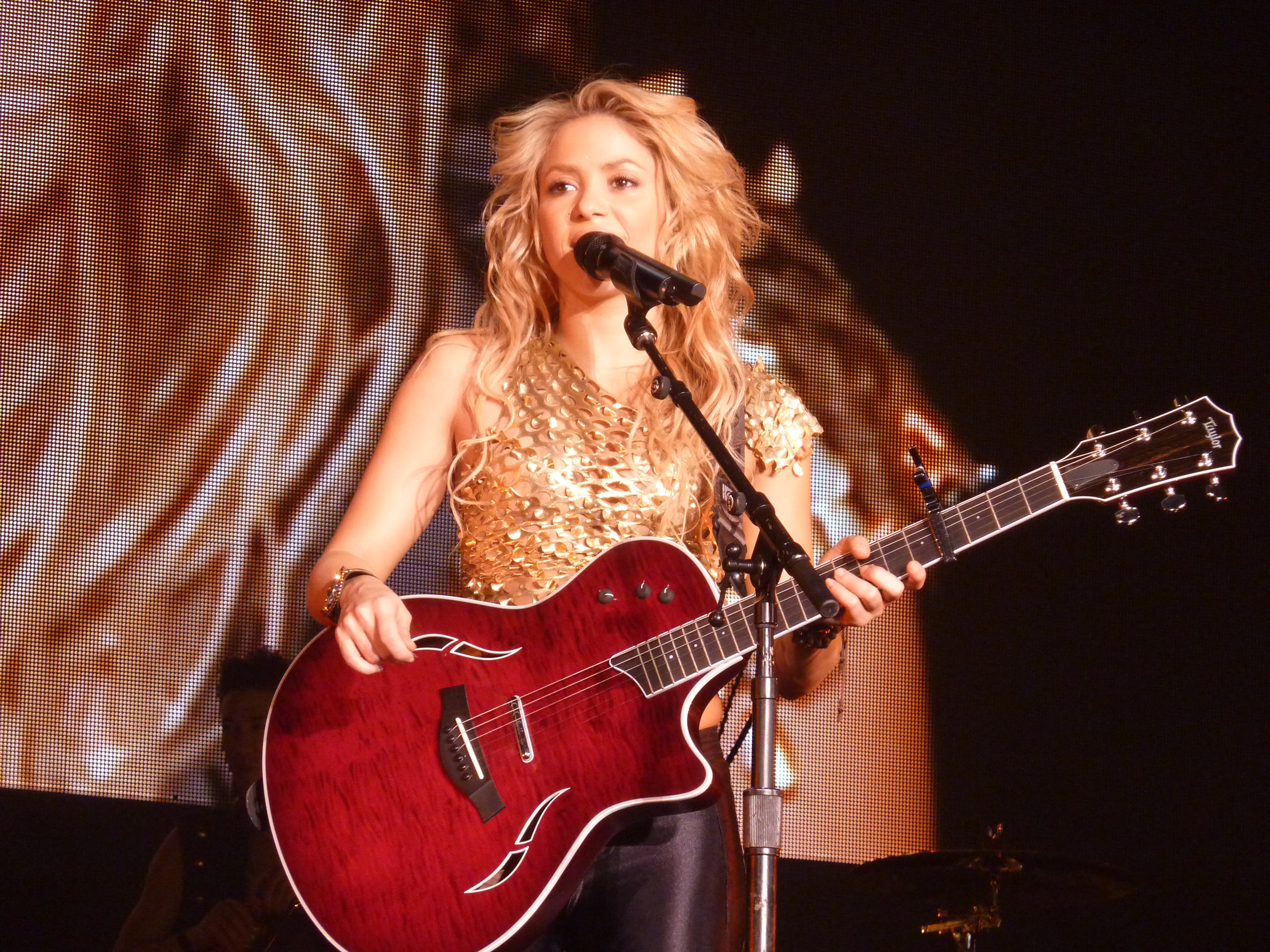
Shakira has been analyzed in several academic books for her influences from different parts of the world.

Shakira has been analyzed in numerous academic journals. Within these studies, various media assure that her Lebanese ancestry with her Latin nationality makes her possess a multiculturality that at the same time makes her a phenomenon within the industry since she is capable of mixing diverse cultures and fusing them in an excellent way both in music and outside of it. also mentioning the lyrics of her songs such as "Pies Descalzos, sueños blancos", "Octavo Día", "How do you do" and more are seen from a philosophical point of view, several other of her songs such as She Wolf, No, No creo and Te Necesito have shown a great knowledge of the different philosophical currents in the history of mankind and her music is a reflection of this, her name is taken as an example of a powerful brand in the world by various universities.

The book "Musical imagiNation: U.S. "Colombian identity and the Latin music boom" discusses the creative work and media personas of talented Colombian artists like Shakira.

Currently the work and cultural impact of Shakira is used by several students in various universities in Latin America or more foreign countries using its success in the world without losing its essence and Latin roots, one of the most popular topics. Other popular topics are how the name Shakira has become a millionaire and a giant brand in the entertainment industry, in the same way, essays are made about Shakira and the representation of women throughout the planet, strongly associating it with the feminist idea. Her songs, especially from her first albums, are studied for hidden messages that can be found, be it criticism or point of view about a subject without supporting or being against it. After Shakira performed the 2020 Super Bowl performance, she received acclaim from various media for her incorporation of Latin sounds and dances, some expressing that "her halftime show performance deserved a standing ovation due to the various cultural tributes" and even reaching to state that "Shakira's set of songs will be a great cultural study for years to come".

After a week of Shakira: Bzrp Music Sessions, Vol. 53 release, the track was part of a study at the National Autonomous University of Mexico as a subject of analysis by gender studies experts. Educators studied the symbolism in its lyrics from the point of view of gender violence.

The University of Oxford made official the inclusion of Shakira as a mandatory bibliography within the history major in the topics of "Latin Studies", making her the only and first Latin musical artist to appear with an article in the research database in the history of the university.

== Artists inspired by Shakira ==
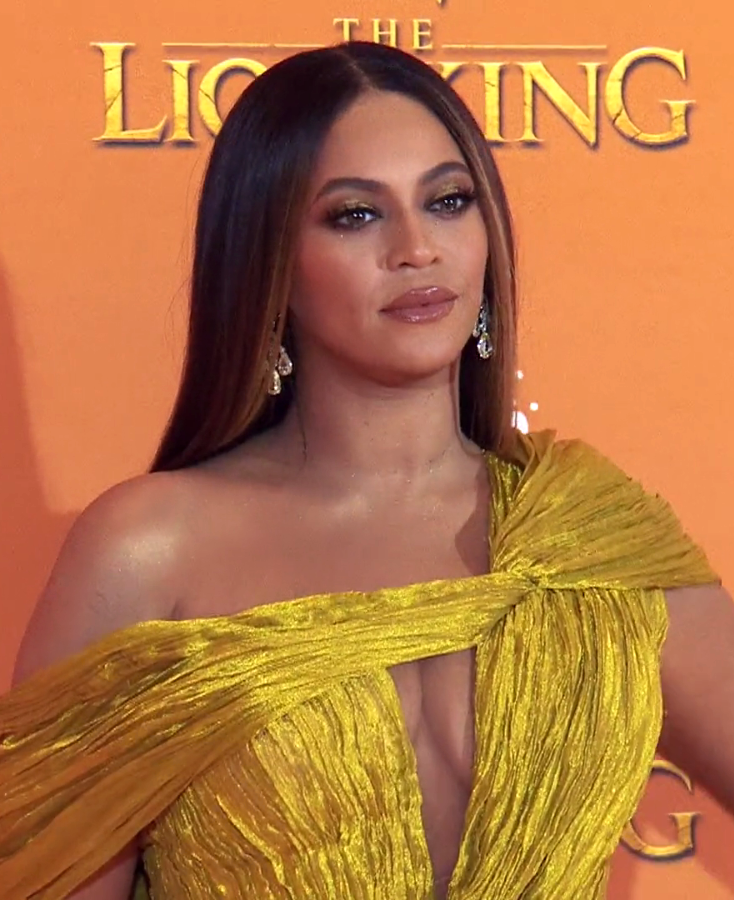
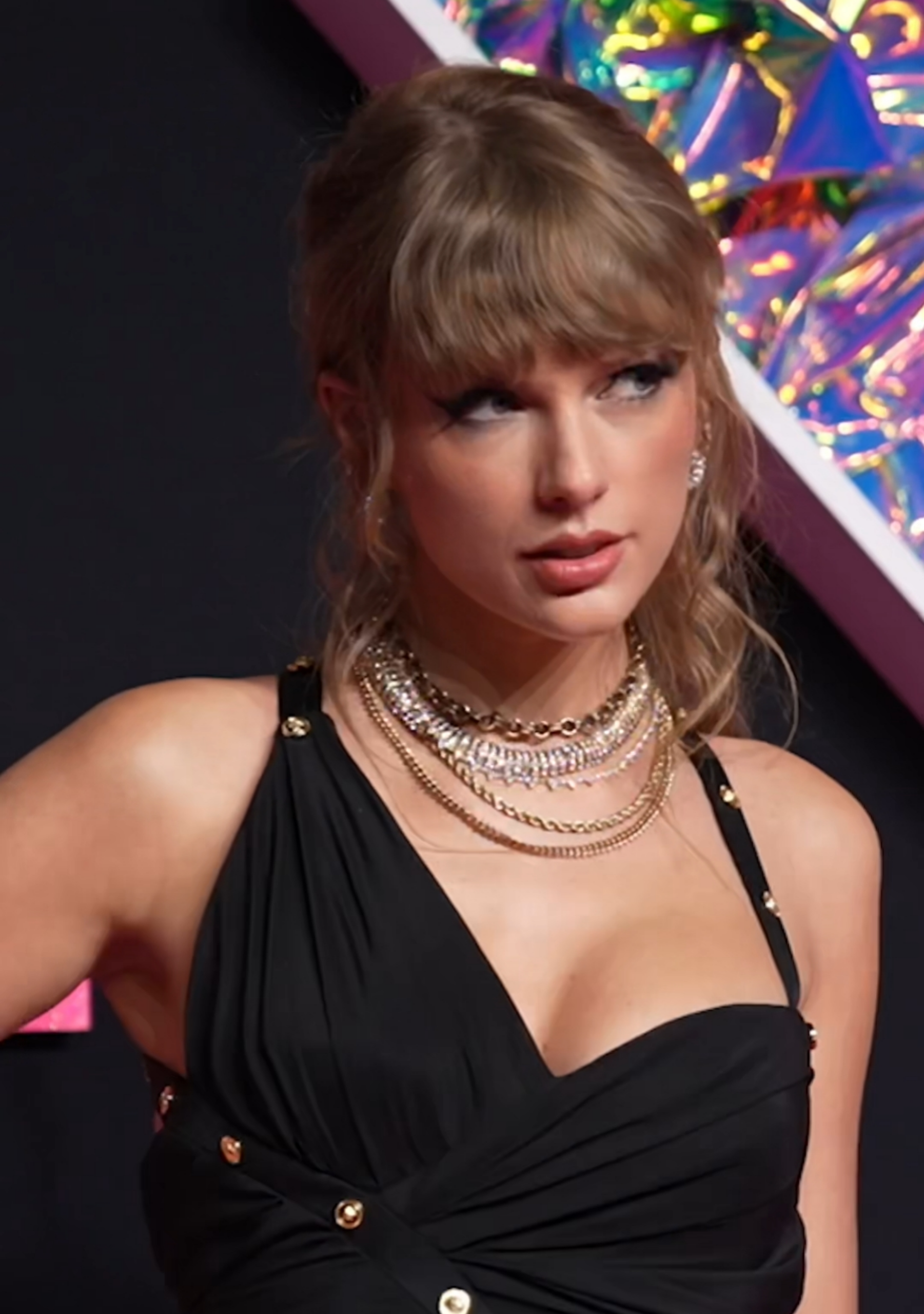
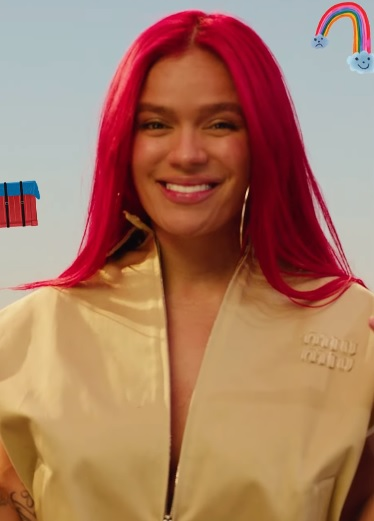
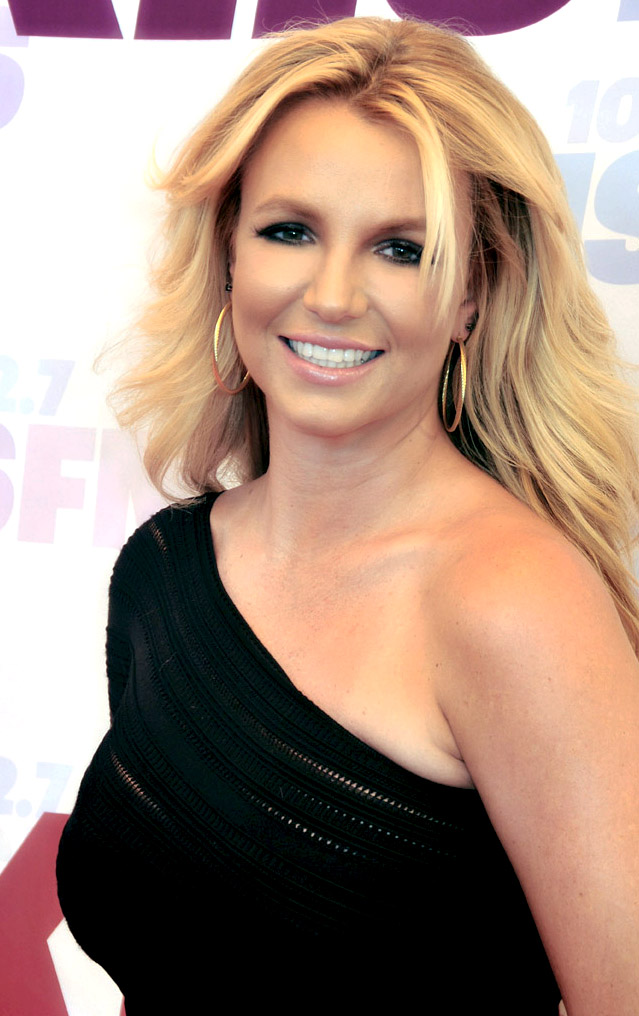
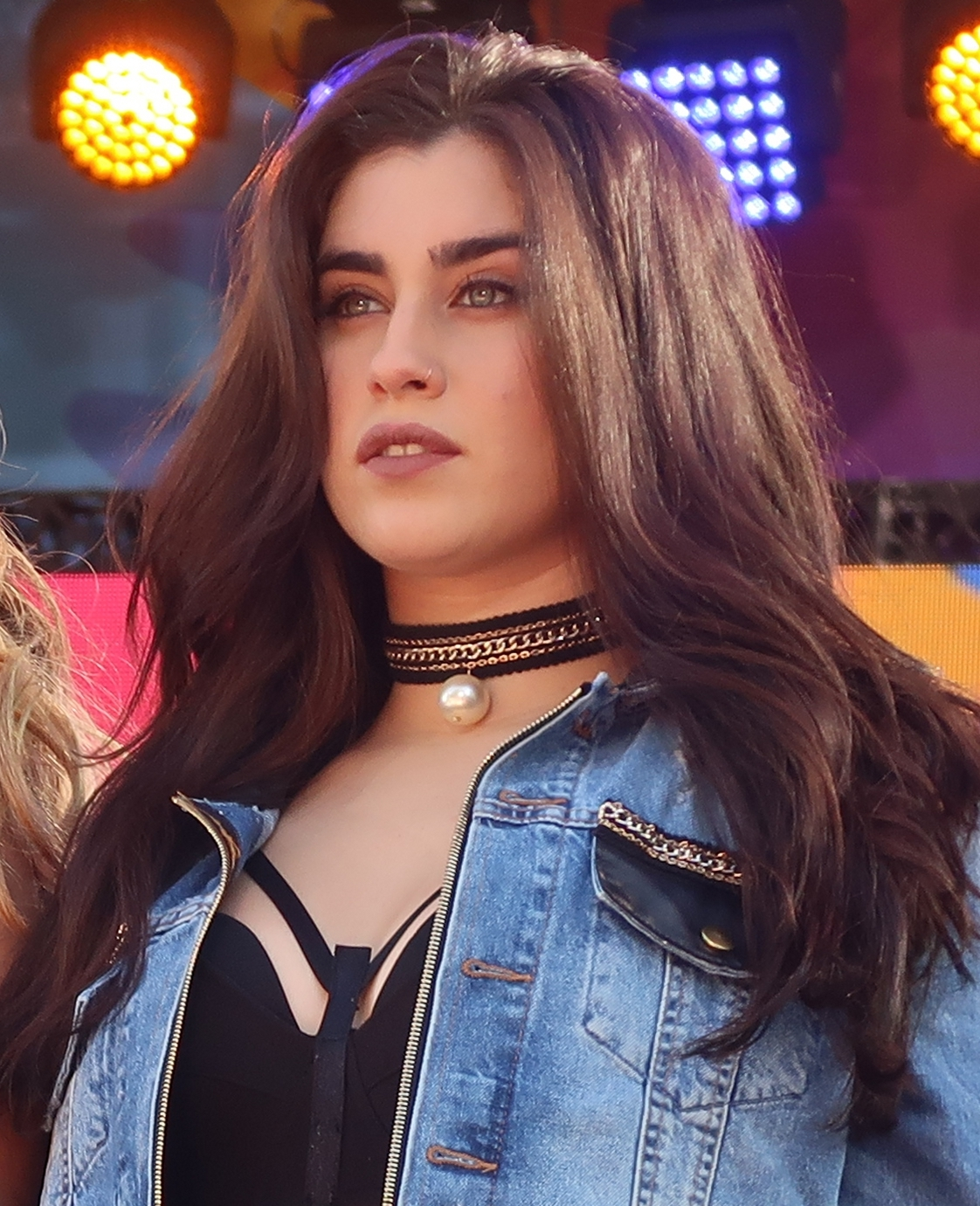
Several artists have been influenced by Shakira (from left to right) Beyoncé Taylor Swift, Karol G Britney Spears and Lauren Jauregui have expressed their admiration for Shakira in various interviews.

Shakira has been named as an inspiration by various artists. The list includes notable names:

- Beyonce
- Rihanna
- Lauren Jauregui
- Fergie
- Maluma
- Karol G
- Natti Natasha
- Kali Uchis
- Camilo
- Lele Pons
- Nicky Jam
- Prince Royce
- Andres Cuervo
- Rosalía
- Belinda
- J Balvin
- Camila Cabello
- Anitta
- Christina Aguilera
- Becky G
- Rihanna
- Justin Bieber
- Katy Perry
- Kylie Jenner
- Sean Paul
- Britney Spears
- Natalia Lafourcade
- Taylor Swift
- Selena Gomez
- Lin Manuel
- Brie Larson
- Joaquina
- Will.i.am
- Farina
- Pitbull
- Cardi B
- Anuel AA
- Manuel Turizo
- Mon Laferte
- Sofía Reyes
- Carla Morrison
- Samira Said
- Nawal El Zoghbi
- Dulce María
- Tini Stoessel
- Flo Milli
- Vanness Wu
- Li Yuchun
- Gale
- Paloma Mami
- Francisca Valenzuela
- Elena Rose
- Maria Becerra
- Juan Luis Guerra
- Grupo Frontera
- Greecy
- Pedro Capo
- Ayra Starr
- Sasha Keable
- Romeo Santos
- Wendy Sulca
- Ibeyi
- Lola Índigo
- Bad Gyal
- Rachel Zegler
- Gabby Douglas
- Jessie Reyez
- Nora Fatehi
- Young Miko
- Kenia OS
- Chanel Terrero
- Lali Esposito
- Paty Cantú
- Danna Paola
- Emilia Mernes
- Sebastian Yatra
- Salma Hayek
- Rita Ora
- Simone & Simaria
- Bizarrap
- BoA
- Nina Sky
- Prima J
- Greeicy Rendon
- Nathy Peluso
- Ana Mena
- Nacho
- Shang Wenjie
- Dua Lipa
- Zara Larsson

Shakira for us in Colombia and I think in the entire Latin industry, she's one of the most important singers in the world because she's been able to crossover. She speaks and sings in English and Spanish, so she has everything. She also has three songs in the World Cup. I want to do that in the future—I want to be a legend, not just a singer. A legend. Somebody that you can remember forever.

— Karol G, 2019'

"For me, Shakira is like Beyoncé or Madonna, when I received her call saying that she liked my style and that she had a song to launch me, I couldn't believe it, I was paralyzed and my girlfriend (Rosalía) was also very happy for me"

— Rauw Alejandro, 2022'

Shakira has also received the admiration of various artists such as: Madonna, Lady Gaga, Momoland, Itzy, Black M, Daddy Yankee, Norah Jones, IZA, Ariana Grande, Eminem, Chayanne, Chris Evans, Celine Dion, Coldplay, Kesha, Ricky Martin, and Kings of Leon. Artists such as Simone & Simaria, Luísa Sonza, and Lil Pump have expressed wanting to collaborate with Shakira

Many artists, celebrities, and politicians have also attended Shakira's concerts, such as: Yoshiki, Hiroshi Mikitani, Ayumi Hamasaki, Namie Amuro,Rupert Grint and Emma Watson, Felipe Calderon, Juan Manuel Santos, Michelle Bachelet, Queen Rania of Jordan, Jim Carrey Sebastián Piñera, Rafael Nadal,King Felipe and Queen Letizia of Spain and more.

Shakira has also received the admiration of intellectuals and writers such as Nobel Prize winner Gabriel García Márquez who has exclaimed that "No one of any age can sing or dance with the innocent sensuality Shakira seems to have invented".

== Achievements ==
Shakira further established herself with the successful crossover of Laundry Service in 2001, expanding her reach to a global audience. She is widely recognised for helping bring Latin music to broader international mainstream audiences, becoming the first South American artist to have a song chart No. 1 on the Billboard Hot 100 and contributing to the wider Latin pop boom with Gloria Estefan with Ricky Martin.

- Shakira became the first artist to perform a song entirely in Spanish at the MTV awards with her song La Tortura in 2005.
- She owns the most successful crossover in history thanks to her album Laundry Service.
- She was the first Latina artist in history to be nominated for the Brit Awards, Bambi Awards and NRJ awards.
- She is the best-selling Latin female artist in history with 80 million records sold.
- She is the overall Latin American artist with the most awards of all time.
- In 1999, Shakira's MTV Unplugged became the first episode of the show to be broadcast entirely in Spanish.
- Shakira's "Whenever Wherever" music video airs on MTV with the English and Spanish versions being the first time this has happened.
- Shakira became the first South American artist to top the Billboard Hot 100 chart thanks to her hit Hips don't lie.

== Social impact ==
Shakira's influence exceeds the boundaries of pop culture, she has become a socio-political influencer, and was named as one of the "World's Greatest Leaders" of 2017 by Fortune Magazine.

Shakira in 2017 at the World Economic Forum where she was awarded with the Crystal Award for her efforts and impact in education

=== Education ===
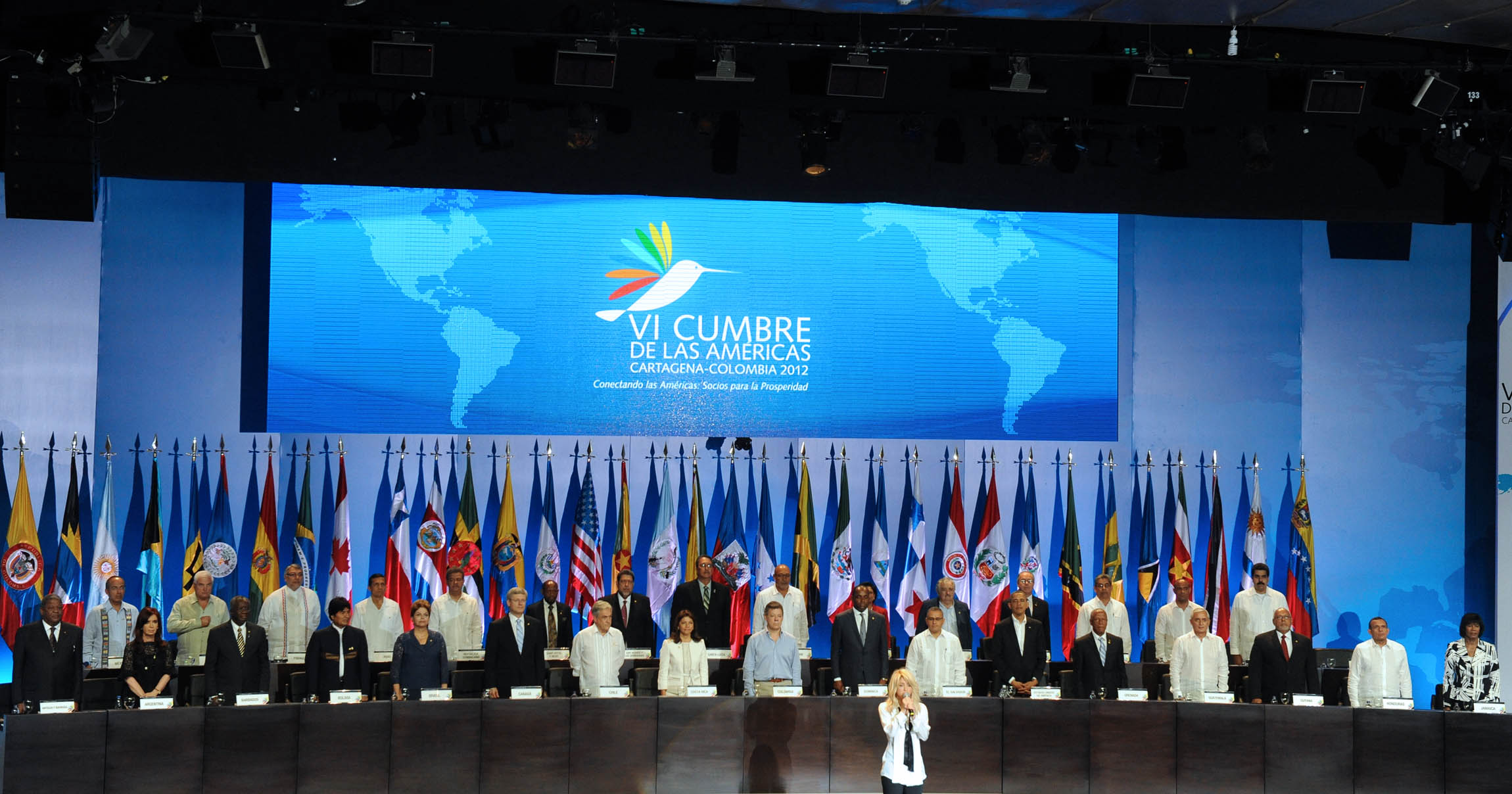
Shakira sings the Colombian anthem at the start of the Summit of the Americas in Cartagena, Colombia.

Shakira has been an advocate for change with a lasting impact on Colombia's education sector. Named an "education champion," Shakira has campaigned and persuaded the Colombian, Latin American governments, and the World Bank to invest in Education. In 2008, she served as the Honorary Chair of the Global Campaign for Education Global Action Week. Later, in 2010, she collaborated with the World Bank and the Barefoot Foundation to establish an initiative that distributes educational and developmental programs for children across Latin America. In 2011, she was appointed by President Barack Obama to the President's Advisory Commission on Educational Excellence for Hispanics. The World Literacy Foundation announced Shakira as the recipient of the 2020 Global Literacy Award for "her significant contribution to the improvement of literacy for disadvantaged children around the world." In 2021, El Tiempo columnist; Juan Esteban Constaín argued that Shakira has contributed to Colombia's welfare specifically in the education sector more than the country's "corrupt" political system.

In 2016, Shakira's Pies Descalzos Foundation school in Barranquilla was named the number one public school in Colombia.

Because of her impact on music and education, Shakira is a common guest speaker at the world's most elite and leading universities. Shakira was received as a guest speaker at Oxford Union in Oxford University to speak on her trajectory as a philanthropist and her key learnings throughout her decades of work in providing quality education to Colombia and Latin America's most vulnerable kids. Similarly Shakira was invited to Harvard University by the Harvard Foundation to share her experience in the education field. The same day she was honored as the "Artist of the Year" for her contributions and approach in rhythmic-cultural music and philanthropy.

=== Feminism in Spain ===
During the march on International Women's Day, 2023, former minister Izkia Siches declared that Shakira had "led the march" while a British journalist commented that there were Shakira masks selling very well, various posters with phrases from Shakira songs such as "She Wolf" and "Out of your league", while the latter was played with several girls singing it throughout the day. However, in Spain, the treasury would have fined all the women who carried posters with Shakira's phrases during the march.

== Political impact ==
From her philanthropy to her ability to influence world leaders, it seems like there's nothing Shakira can't do.

— Erynn Ruiz

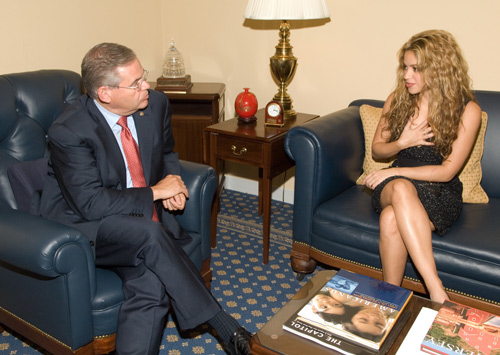
Shakira in 2007 with U.S. senator Bob Menendez

The Independent has described Shakira as a "living proof that pop and politics mix" further noting that through her efforts she is one of the few celebrities who has "the ears of the global political elite". Shakira has worked with politicians like U.S. Presidents, Barack Obama and Bill Clinton, U.K Prime Minister, Gordon Brown, Qatari royal consort, Sheikha Moza Bint Nasser, Prince William, Duke of Cambridge. Israeli President Shimon Peres, and former U.K Prime Minister Tony Blair. Successfully persuading all to contribute higher investments on global education with a specific focus on ECE in Colombia and Latin America.

As a key figure in Latin America, Shakira joined participating members like President Barack Obama and 30 other world leaders at the 6th Summit of the Americas and brought forward the discussion of early childhood education for the first time in the summits' history.

In 2011, Shakira was appointed by President Barack Obama to his White House Initiative on Educational Excellence for Hispanics. Her role as "President's Advisory Commission on Educational Excellence for Hispanics" was in the merit of her extensive promotion of early childhood education in Latin America.

== Depictions and Immortalization ==
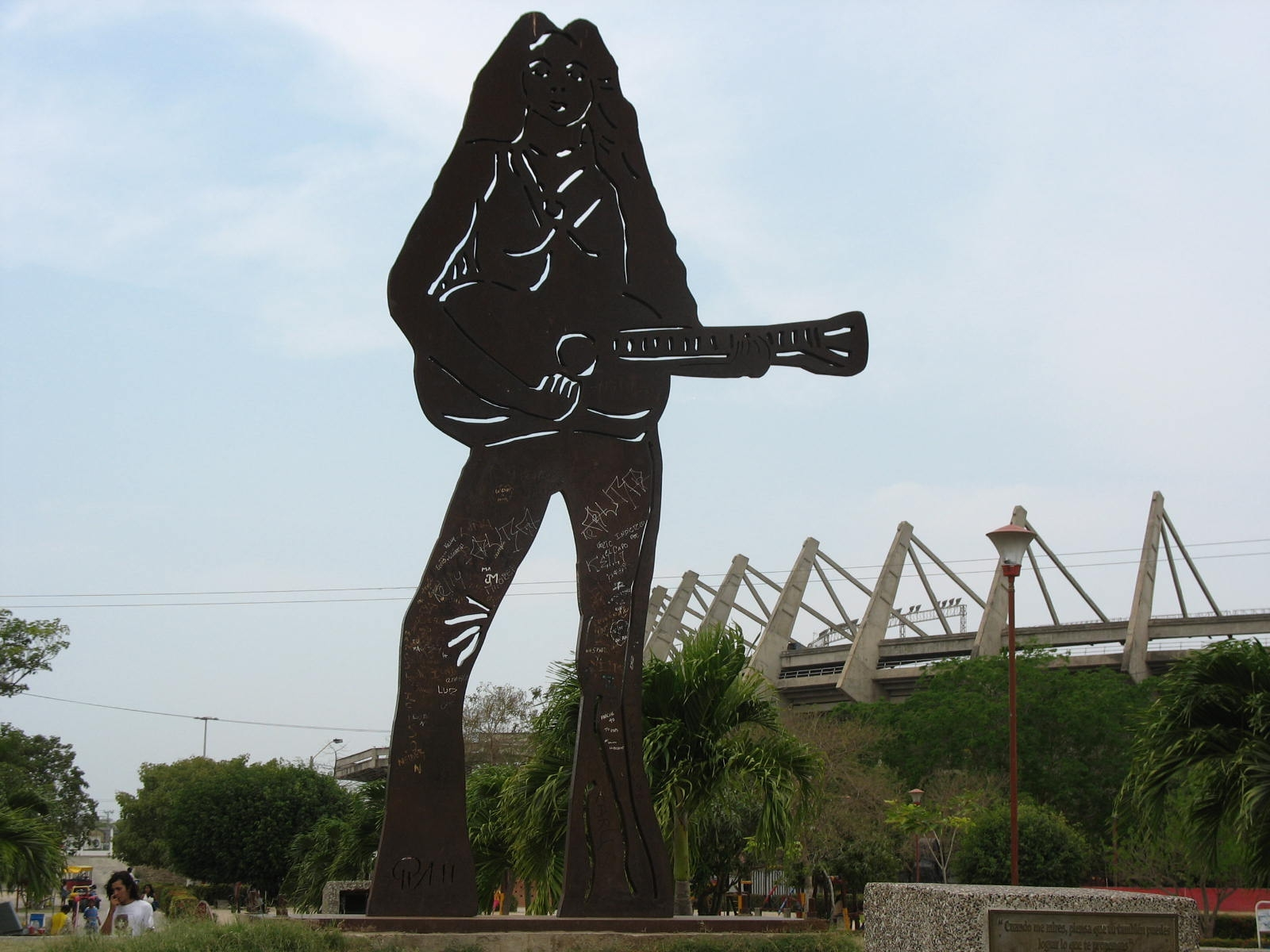
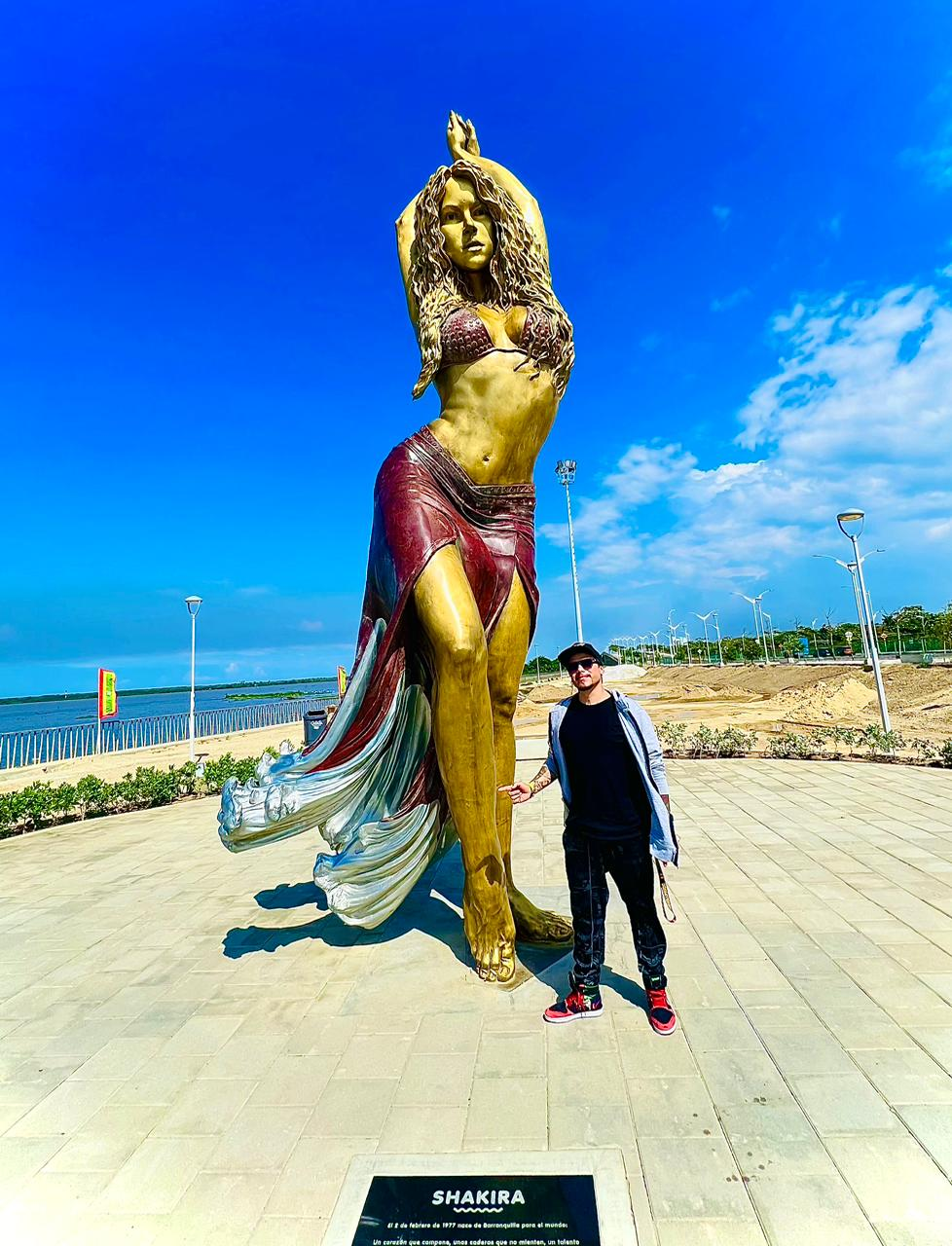
Statues of Shakira in Barranquilla Colombia
- In 2006, a six-tonne (6.6-short-ton), 5-metre-tall (16 ft) statue of Shakira; Escultura de Shakira designed by the German artist Dieter Patt was installed in Shakira's hometown Barranquilla in the park near Estadio Metropolitano Roberto Meléndez.
- On 6 December 2006, Shakira received the key to Miami, the honour was presented to her by Mayor Manny Díaz for her "global representation of Latinos". The day was declared as "Shakira Day" in the city.
- In July 2018, The Cedars Reserve in Shakira's ancestral hometown Tannourine, Lebanon named one of its squares after Shakira. The square holds the name "Shakira Isabelle Mebarak"
- In December 2023, the mayor of Barranquilla, Jaime Pumarejo unveiled a second 6.5 m (21 ft) tall, bronze statue of Shakira on the Gran Malecon de Barranquilla. The statue honors her contributions to music, Colombian representation worldwide, and her humanitarian efforts in the country.
- In February 2025, a mural of Shakira was unveiled by artist Luis Fernando Guarín in Shakira's hometown of Barranquilla to celebrate her return to the city for her Las Mujeres ya no Lloran World tour

== See also ==
- List of Shakira concerts
- Shakira as a feminist icon
- Shakira live performances
- List of awards and nominations received by Shakira
- Shakira discography
- Shakira videography
- List of songs recorded by Shakira
- Bibliography of works on Shakira
- List of cover versions of Shakira songs
- Shakira Fandom
- Shakira as a Cultural icon
