= Shakira fandom =

Community of fans of Colombian singer Shakira

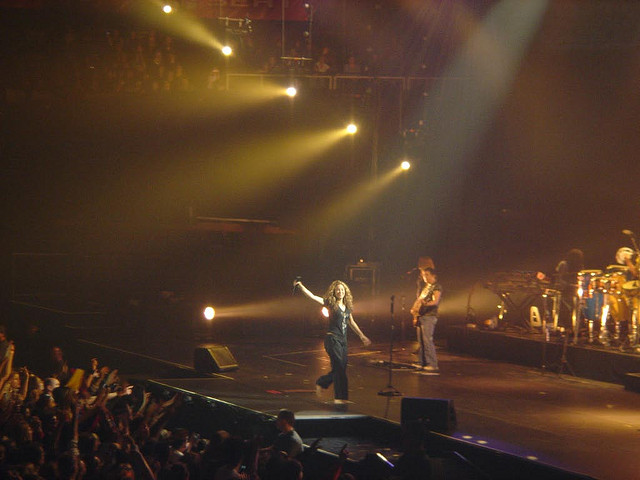
Shakira interacting with her fandom during the Oral Fixation World Tour concert in 2007.

Shakira fandom is the name given to the community of fans of the Colombian singer Shakira. The fandom is made up of people of all ages and different cultures. According to the book "Shakira Una Mirada desde el corazón", Shakira enjoyed a "cult" following in the Hispanic communities especially.

According to the television media, the peak of so-called Shakiramanía was in the mid-1990s, when she successfully debuted in the music market, breaking records of that time. In the words of Rolling Stone, she essentially redefined Latin rock and pop. Young people (especially girls) from Latin countries imitated Shakira's appearance, singing and dancing. The wearing of colored braids, leather pants and shirts with bracelets became a trend in the late-1990s.

Shakira's fandom groups are scattered throughout the world and have been covered by national news for charitable activities as well as confrontations on social media. Shakira herself witnessed various harassing and obsessed fans who tried to attack the celebrity, violate her privacy or even have the desire to kill her.

== Origins ==
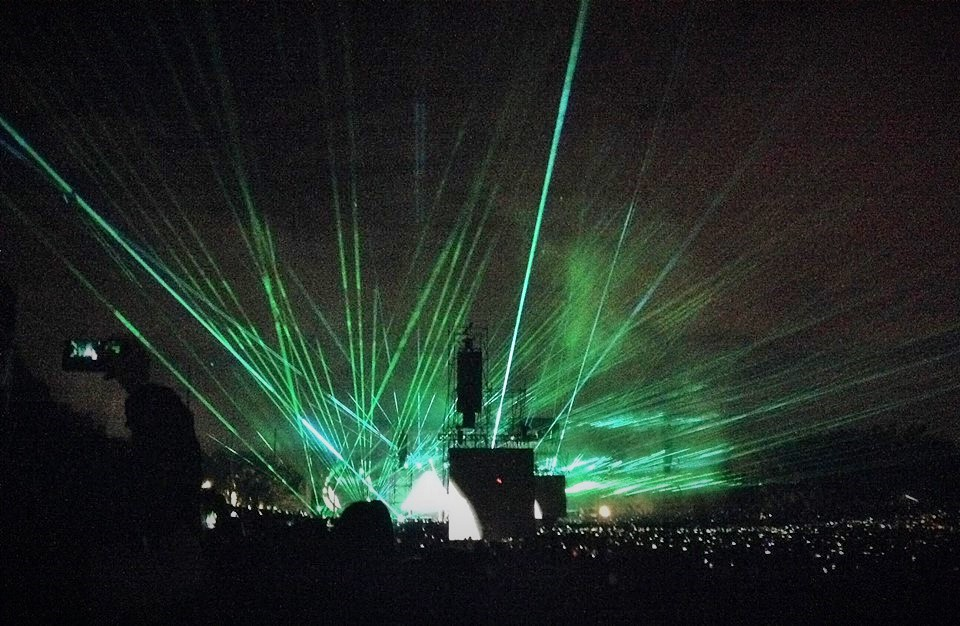
The Azteca stadium full of fans of Shakira in 2017 for her tour "El Dorado World Tour"

=== Shakiramanía ===
During the mid-1990s, Shakira was already establishing herself in the world of Latin music and in some parts of Europe due to the success of her album Pies Descalzos (1995). In this period, Shakira adopted a rocker look, consisting of leather pants, bracelets and prominent hair. A sensation in Latin America, the look came to be known as 'Shakira fever' or Shakiramanía. The name and image on Pies Descalzos together with ¿Dónde Están los ladrones? would be referenced for the next few years as Shakira's essential brand and stage persona. Her young fans imitated the album covers' promotional images of Shakira, which led to a trend in Latin American youth at the time. In countries such as Spain, Turkey, Mexico and Argentina, Shakira's fashion influenced daily fashion for girls and adolescents emulating the singer during the promotion of her fourth album: they wore the thread bracelets and colored braids. The hippie look was well received as it identified with the sounds that Shakira embodied in her albums. Once the crossover was made to the world market, Shakiramanía spread globally: fangirls from the United States and other countries began to emulate Shakira's rock style, singing and dancing techniques. In later years, Shakira's barefoot style of performing would become a focal point of her image.

== Groups and nicknames ==
The name of the Shakira fandom is not decided by themselves or by the media, although the word "ShakiFans" is widely used to refer to fan groups in Latin American countries, likewise there are variations of this name such as "Wolfies". Various names also vary depending on the country, although magazines and websites may only call them "Shakira fans". The Shakira fandom is considered to be the most extensive fan base for an overall Latin artist ever. One of the oldest groups for Shakira fans is called "Official Fans Club Shakira Barranquilla", with various users belonging to the same city of origin of the singer.

== Multimedia ==
There are several podcasts dedicated mostly to Shakira. One of them is "Shakipedia: A Shakira Podcast" launched in 2002 and is available on services such as Spotify, Apple Podcasts and several other podcast platforms. Another podcast is "Hits Don't Lie", which makes a play on words with "Hips Don't Lie"; the podcast is also widely available on streaming services.

=== Fan clubs ===
Shakira has various fan clubs in Hispanic and foreign countries. For example, the official Peruvian fan club is "Club Shakira Peru", founded in 1996. In countries like Japan, Shakira's fan clubs have also appeared, which were waiting for her upon her arrival in the Asian country. The official name of Shakira's Mexican fan club is called "Las Caderas Mexico".

== Fan activism ==
Every year, Shakira fans get together to carry out charity work in favor of the community. The Club Shakira Peru organizes the so-called "Shakichocolatadas"—where hot chocolate is served in a special gathering—to provide a Christmas dinner to the poorest children in the country. Likewise, Shakira's Colombian fan club organized for the donation of 400 new notebooks extracted from already used notebooks, that is, recycled ones that we gathered at a national level and transformed by a foundation.

== Interaction ==
Shakira has interacted with her audience on several occasions at her concerts and outside of these, during her show on "The Sun Comes Out World Tour" Shakira had fans come up on stage with her to do a belly dancing routine. Another moment was when a fan managed to pass the security of the stage and ran to hug the artist, who tried to separate her, but Shakira herself prevented it by even giving her a photo of both.

== Impersonators ==
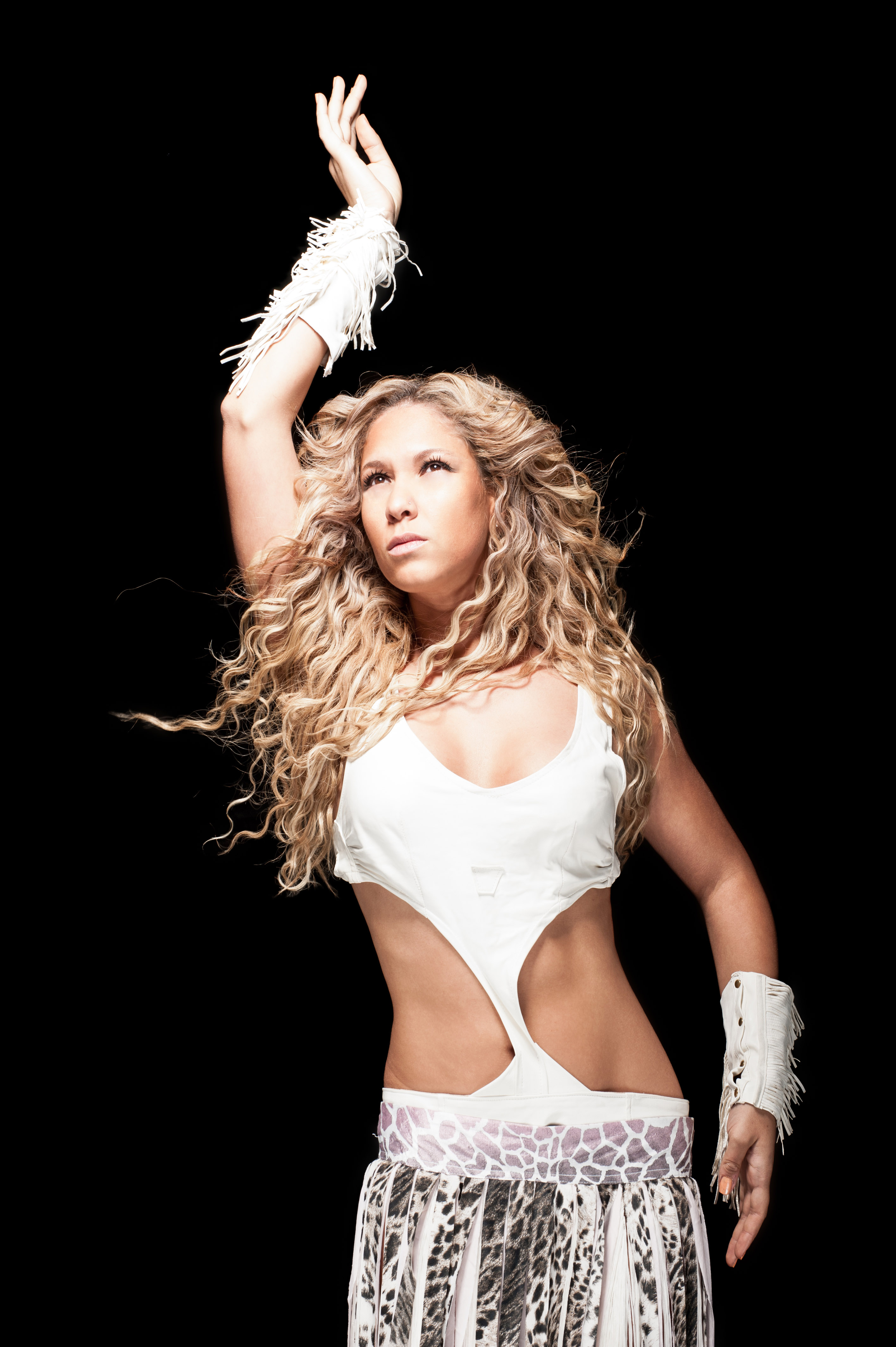
A person seen impersonating Shakira

A Shakira impersonator is an artist who mimics or copies Shakira's look and sound. Professional Shakira impersonators or tribute acts have been around since at least the mid-2000s, and continue to be popular. Some tribute acts have performed in front of thousands of people in both Latin and other countries. Many Shakira tribute acts include in their repertoire a re-enactment of her presentations at awards ceremonies such as the Latin Grammys or her famous appearance at the Super Bowl. Some impersonators have performed on television programs, or in nightclubs and music festivals.

=== Origins ===
Shakira impersonators began to appear in the mid-1990s when Latin youth imitated the style portrayed on the cover of her second studio album. Braids and "rock" style were a sensation in countries like Peru, Colombia, Mexico, Argentina. Many youth imitated her characteristic dance and style. One commentator said that "not only has her music been a huge sensation in the United States, but her look of skin-tight thrift-shop hip-huggers, old belly shirts and funky hats have set off a style revolution that has spread to girls around the world. But any effect she’s had on the fashion world has slipped right past Shakira." After Shakira's crossover to the mainstream and subsequent makeover, girls and young people changed their style to more closely resemble their idol's by wearing belly dance belts and changing their hair colour to blond. In Colombian talent contests young women moved and sang as similar to Shakira as possible. Shakira's dance style was mimicked worldwide by young people and adults who saw her as a role model.

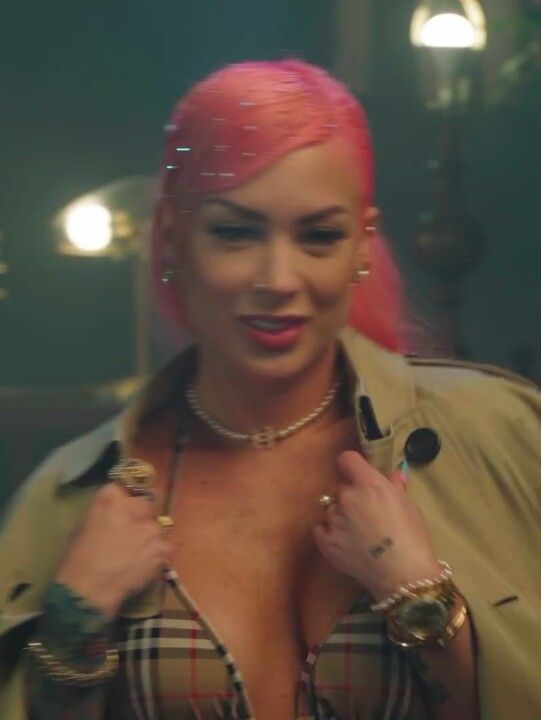
Peruvian model and singer Leslie Shaw performed a tribute act to her on a Peruvian show imitating Shakira's performance at the 2000 Latin Grammys.

=== Cultural depictions ===
In general, imitating Shakira is a fairly common practice in mostly Latino and Hispanic countries. This artistic practice came in a variety of types and forms, including impersonations, cosplays, or sound imitations and also as skits and drag

"You will see that there are curramberas of all ages and there are Shakiras of all ages, who knew what they were doing there, the happiness with which they did it, with which they represented you, they all wanted to be you."

— Carlos Vives

performance. Her fandom was done in an amateur way (fan conventions, theme parties, tours and other forms of adulation). Professional Shakira impersonators can be labeled as tribute bands and also "Impressionists". The general public have done so through competitions, as well as public personalities in other modalities such as tribute shows.

In the American continent, various Shakira Impersonators have been presented in programs such as Mi Nombre Es..., Buscando una Estrella, or the Chilean and Peruvian television series Yo Soy. In Spanish reality competition series Tu cara me suena, she has been imitated on multiple occasions, including the interpreters of Leslie Shaw, Eva Soriano and more.

On some occasions Shakira has been parodies with artists being imitators. In the case of American comedian Mo Collins of Mad TV, she made a video in 2001 parodying "Whenever Wherever" and "Objection (Tango)". Similarly, the Australian show Big Bite made a video parodying "Whenever Wherever" in the same year.

The singer María Gracia Viteri became an impersonator of Shakira in her concert offered in the city of Sambordón, paying tribute with a medley of her greatest hits in both Spanish and English.

=== Awards ===
In 2022, the Chamber of Broadcasters of Mexico in the United States awarded Shakibecca the Golden Microphone award for "outstanding career as Shakira's double." In 2025 The "Official Fans Club Shakira Barranquilla" fan club has been recognized with a nomination for Best Fandom of the Year at the Nuestra Tierra Awards.

=== Examples of professional Shakira impersonators and tribute bands ===
The following is a selected style list of Shakira impersonators and tribute bands who have gained recognition in the entertainment industry.

- Shakibecca: She began in 1996 at the age of 12 imitating dance, later she participated in musical programs on Venezuelan television. She participated in Fama, sudor y lagrimas and in Buscando una Estrella, in the latter personifying Shakira where, at just 15 years old, she first met her idol. Such was the success achieved that they called her from Mexico to continue her imitations in Parodiando.
- Ciego Sordomudos Band: A Peruvian band that tours around their native country performing tribute concerts to Shakira, mostly playing songs from Pies Descalzos and Donde Estan los Ladrones?.
- Noelia Quiroz: Known as the "Chilean Shakira", she made her debut thanks to her participation in programs such as "My name is...". Quiroz performs tribute acts throughout her country and is the nationally most famous Shakira impersonator.

=== Influenced celebrity fans ===
Indian singer and actress Neha Kakkar in her youth was often referred to as the "Shakira of India" due to their similar styles.

== See also ==
- Cultural impact of Shakira
