= Bibliography of works on Shakira =

Works on Shakira
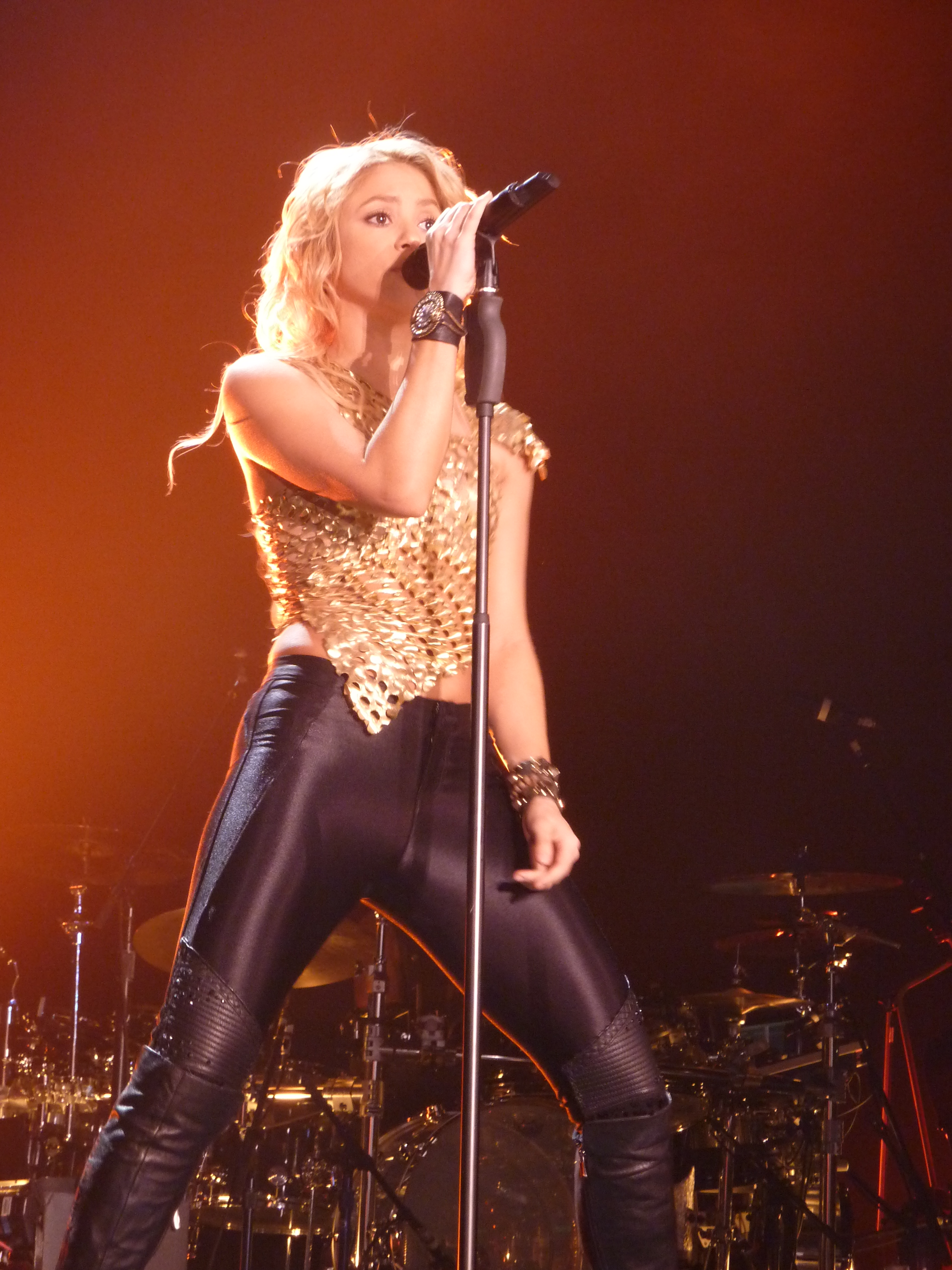
- Shakira, thanks to her success, has been used as an example of improvement and success in several books.
- Books in Spanish: 8
- Non-Spanish books: 14
- Essays and other works: 3

The life and work of the Colombian singer Shakira has generated various books that recount her life, experience and achievements. This is a list containing the different works written about Shakira, including biographies, magazines, and articles.

According to various journalists from the 1990s, the appearance of the singer Shakira was an event in the Latin market, her albums "Pies Descalzos" and "¿Donde Está los Ladrones?" They are considered by magazines such as Rolling Stone as essential for the Latin industry in its Latin pop and Latin rock fields, helping to open the doors for new women within these fields mostly dominated by men.

Many authors have written more than one book about Shakira from her biography to her cultural impact and these have been published in various languages such as English, Spanish and others. Published biographies on the singer include: "Shakira, Woman Full of Grace", "Shakira", "Real Life Reader Biography, Shakira", "Shakira, Star Singer". Several being released only in Latin markets while others are released in English for the international market. At the present time, Shakira is used as an example of overcoming a Latino to succeed in the world without losing the culture that characterizes her or her identity, citing her success since the first album, having success in Europe and how it has somehow managed to catapult the Latin music to the international market, bringing music in Spanish to various countries outside of Latin culture. She has been the subject of more than one scholarly articles as well.

== Books written ==
=== 2000 - Present ===
Book title	Year	Author(s)	Publisher	Pages	Identifiers	Notes	Ref(s).
Shakira "Woman full of grace"	2001	Ximena Diego	FIRESIDE Rockefeller Center	156	ISBN 0-7432-1599-0	The biography concentrated on Shakira's childhood.	
Shakira "Mujer llena de gracia"	2001	Ximena Diego	FIRESIDE Rockefeller Center	156	ISBN 0-7432-1599-0	The biography concentrated on Shakira's childhood.	
Shakira	2002	Wilson Wayne	Mitchell Lane Publishers	32	ISBN 1-58415-071-8	Examines the life of Latina pop rock artist and actress Shakira	
Musical imagiNation: U.S. "Colombian identity and the Latin music boom"	2010	María Elena Cepeda	New York University Press	255	ISBN 9780814716915	The book discusses the creative work and media personas of talented Colombian artists like Shakira.	
Shakira (High Interest Books)	2003	Ursula Rivera	Children's Press (CT)	48	ISBN 0-516-27861-4	A board book containing Shakira's biography in words and pictures.	
What it's like to be Shakira	2010	Rebecca Thatcher	Hockessin, Del.: Mitchell Lane Publishers	40	ISBN 9781584158516	Describes the life of music superstar Shakira.	
Shakira Star Singer	2011	Zella William	New York: PowerKids Press	28	ISBN 9781448814572	This book describes the life and career of Shakira, singer and songwriter.	
Shakira	2007	Holly Day	Detroit: Lucent Books	112	ISBN 9781590189740	An introduction to the life and career of the singer Shakira	
Shakira: Así es su vida	2012	Sandoval Reyes	Cupula (Libros cupulos), 2012	95	ISBN 9788448069964	The beginnings of Shakira, her struggle in the industry and her current success around the planet.	
Shakira: Pure Intuition	2011	Laura Corpa	Barcelona : Difusión y Publicaciones.	71	ISBN 978-84-8443-732-1	Current texts in Spanish about one of the most interesting characters: Shakira.	
Shakira	2008	Katherine Krohn	Minneapolis : Twenty-First Century Books	112	ISBN 978-0-8225-7159-9	A biography of the famous Colombian singer and song writer Shakira	
Shakira : Lo que nadie conoce	2006	María Sánchez	México, D.F. : Debolsillo	222	ISBN 0-307-39109-4	Biography of the Best Selling Colombian artist of all time.	
Shakira : Nueva diosa del rock	2001	Edgar García	Bogotá : Planeta, ©2001.	208	ISBN 958-42-0103-4	The story of the most successful Latina of the moment contains images and text	
Shakira : International music star	2015	Sarah Tieck	Minneapolis, Minnesota : Abdo Publishing	25	ISBN 978-1-62969-143-5	Biography of Shakira educational and informative for children and adolescents	
Shakira	2021	Patricia Ramírez	Vero Beach : Rourke Educational Media	31	ISBN 978-1-7316-4367-4	This book about pop star Shakira covers her talent, goals, rise to stardom, how she's changing the world..	
Shakira - Una mirada desde el corazón	2015	Bonifacio Vincenzi	Colombia : Panesi Edizioni, 2015	35	ISBN 9788899289171	Este libro no es sólo un libro de Shakira, la cantante colombiana más amada y famosa en el mundo.	
Shakira : La star au grand coeur	2007	Thomas Tolbiac	Paris : Éd. ESI, impr. 2007	64	ISBN 978-2-35355-018-0	L'ouvrage retrace la carrière de la chanteuse, auteur, compositeur, interprète, depuis sa naissance.	
Shakira : La bomba latina	2007	Arnaud Babion	Enghien-les-Bains : Lagune, ©2007.	191	ISBN 978-2-84969-055-0	There is talk of Shakira's success in popularizing the Latin rhythm throughout the world.	
Shakira, l'ange de Colombie	2003	Phil Rando	Lausanne : Favre, 2003.	96	ISBN 9782828907563	It talks about how Shakira has been able to defy every obstacle to get where she is today.	
Shakira "La Diosa de la Luz"	2001	Anabel Lee	Editorial La Mascara	208	ISBN 9788479744625	Book about the life of Shakira who has become a global phenomenon.	
Shakira y Lady Gaga. : Sus Vidas.	2010	José Almanza	CreateSpace, 2010	56	ISBN 9781456455361	Shakira and Lady Gaga. Their lives. concerts, music, tours, artistic work.	
Shakira: La rockera dai piedi scalzi	2017	Paolo Scarioni	Independently published	153	ISBN 9788892333901	Book about Shakira's extensive and complete discography, videography, sales and success	
Shakira ojos asi	2000	Estheban Reynoso	Distal (July 1, 2000)	227	ISBN 9789875020504	Information about Shakira with her songs and several hits.	
SHAKIRA	2007	Rebecca Thatcher Murcia	Iluster Publishing	32	ISBN 9781584156093	Full-color laminated covers - Side-sewn, reinforced library binding - Full Color photos throughout -	
Shakira - Unabridged Guide	2012	Ruth Ruby	Lightning Source Incorporated, 2012	214	ISBN 9781486197798	Complete, Unabridged Guide to Shakira. Get the information you need--fast!	
