= Las Mujeres Ya No Lloran World Tour =

2025–2027 concert tour by Shakira

- Tour by Shakira
- Promotional image
- Location: Africa; Asia; Europe; North America; South America
- Associated album: Las Mujeres Ya No Lloran
- Start date: 11 February 2025
- End date: 2 April 2027
- No. of shows: 130
- Supporting acts: Black Eyed Peas; Meri Deal; Dennis; Gale; Wyclef Jean; Natalie Pérez; Pitbull; Denise Rosenthal; Antonella Sigala; TiziShi; Ángela Torres
- Producer: Live Nation
- Attendance: 4.4 million (Note: Based on 124 shows.)
- Box office: US$565.5 million
- Website: www.shakira.com/tour-hub/

Shakira concert chronology
- El Dorado World Tour (2018); Las Mujeres Ya No Lloran World Tour (2025–2027)

The Las Mujeres Ya No Lloran World Tour is the seventh concert tour by the Colombian singer Shakira. The stadium tour commenced on 11 February 2025 in Rio de Janeiro, Brazil, and is scheduled to conclude on 2 April 2027 in Giza, Egypt. It was first announced in 2021 but was delayed due to the COVID-19 pandemic and was re-announced in 2024, in support of her twelfth studio album, Las Mujeres Ya No Lloran (2024).

The tour has broken numerous ticket sales and venue records while also leaving a significant cultural impact. As of January 2026, it has earned over US$421.6 million within its first 86 concerts, breaking the Guinness World Record for the highest-grossing Latin tour of all time, while also becoming the fifth-highest-grossing tour by a female artist.

== Background and development ==
Following her halftime performance at Super Bowl LIV, Live Nation announced Shakira would tour in 2021. Further news was delayed, due to the COVID-19 pandemic. In September 2023, Shakira told Billboard she planned to release new music and embark on a "global tour" in the following year. She told the publication: "Putting a tour together is fun, but it's a great effort and you have to put everything on the balance and decide what the fans really want to hear, what songs you want to hear and how much production you want. In the end, the more production you have, the higher the ticket price. I want the tickets to be affordable. But to me, the most important thing is the repertoire. That's why I think [my next tour] will be the tour of a lifetime, because I have so many songs."

Las Mujeres Ya No Lloran Tour was announced by Shakira during her appearance as a special guest during Bizarrap's set at Coachella on 13 April 2024. Three days later, Live Nation announced concerts in North America starting that November, with additional concerts added due to demand in Palm Springs, Miami and New York City, respectively. In October 2024, Shakira's official website revealed concerts in the Latin America region; additional concerts were subsequently added in several cities eight days later.

Shakira announced plans to postpone the North American concerts, due to the "overwhelming demand", as well as the "need for larger venues". Following her announcement, the upgraded concerts and venues were announced for May and June 2025 by Live Nation. Additional concerts in Atlanta, Houston and Phoenix were announced on 10 December 2024. On 5 February 2025, it was announced Shakira would headline the Sueños Music Festival. Later that month, it was announced Brazilian DJ Dennis would serve as a supporting act for the tour's opening night. Billboard reported that "an exclusive and unique performance" from the 20 February concert will be featured as part of the Lo Nuestro Awards on Univision. On 14 February, a concert in Santo Domingo, Dominican Republic, was announced; the concert was postponed due to operational issues, and later rescheduled. On 16 February, Shakira cancelled her concert in Lima, Peru, for that same day, due to hospitalization; a rescheduled date was announced the following day, with a third concert added.

On 25 February 2025 Chilean singer Antonella Sigala was announced as the supporting act for the shows in Santiago; the concerts were postponed the evening of the first show. Natalie Pérez served as the supporting act for the 7 and 8 March 2025 concerts in Buenos Aires. Throughout March 2025, additional concerts across various cities in Mexico were announced, for a record total of 22 concerts in that country. In April 2025, additional concerts in East Rutherford and Miami were announced, as well as four additional concerts in Mexico. Puerto Rican singer and songwriter Gale announced she would serve as a supporting act for the 12 and 13 April concerts in Medellín. Wyclef Jean was announced as supporting act for shows in Charlotte (13 May 2025) and Boston (29 May 2025), respectively. On 18 April, Live Nation announced Pitbull as the supporting act for her second show at MetLife Stadium on 16 May.

On 29 May 2025, hours before the Boston show, the concert was cancelled due to "unforeseen circumstances". According to reports, Will.i.am was set to make an appearance during the concert. Subsequently, Shakira's performance at WorldPride in Washington, D.C. was cancelled. On 13 June 2025, the San Antonio show was cancelled less than one hour prior to its start, with the venue citing "ongoing issues". In a statement from Live Nation, the event was postponed due to "structural issues"; the show was later rescheduled for 5 July. That same day, it was announced the 20 June concert in Inglewood, California, had been postponed, following the Los Angeles protests. On 19 June, two additional shows in Mexico were announced. The following day, two additional concerts were announced in California—one in Fresno and an additional date in Inglewood; Black Eyed Peas served as support act for the concerts in Inglewood. In July 2025, fifteen concerts in Latin America were announced. The following month, the 26 September concert was cancelled, due to "circumstances beyond [their] control". Pitbull and Gale also returned as support acts for select concerts in August and September 2025, respectively. In September, a third concert in Buenos Aires was announced. In November and December, concerts in Córdoba, Argentina; El Salvador; and Mexico were also announced. Denise Rosenthal was the support act for the concert in Santiago in November 2025. In December of the same year, Meri Deal, Ángela Torres, and Tizishi served as the supporting acts for the concerts held in Uruguay, Buenos Aires, and Cordoba, respectively.

In January 2026, Shakira was announced as a headliner for Abu Dhabi's Offlimits Music Festival as part of her tour, along with concerts in Aqaba, Jordan, and Doha, Quatar. The following month, a free concert in Mexico at Zócalo and a performance at the Giza pyramid complex in Egypt were also announced. Additionally, she was named the headliner for Todo Mundo no Rio in Copacabana, Rio de Janeiro. In March 2026, eleven concerts in Madrid, Spain, were announced. Billed as a "European residency", the event will take place in September and October of the same year. A temporary venue—Shakira Stadium—will be constructed in Madrid's Villaverde district. The multi-night event will mark the conclusion of the tour. That April and May, a limited run of arena concerts in the United States were announced for June and July of that year, with an additional concert in Madrid added due to demand. In October 2026, a thirteenth concert in Madrid and a concert in Bishkek, Kyrgyzstan, were announced for that same month. The following month, it was announced that three concerts would take place in January 2027 — two in Venezuela and one in Costa Rica, respectively.

== Production ==
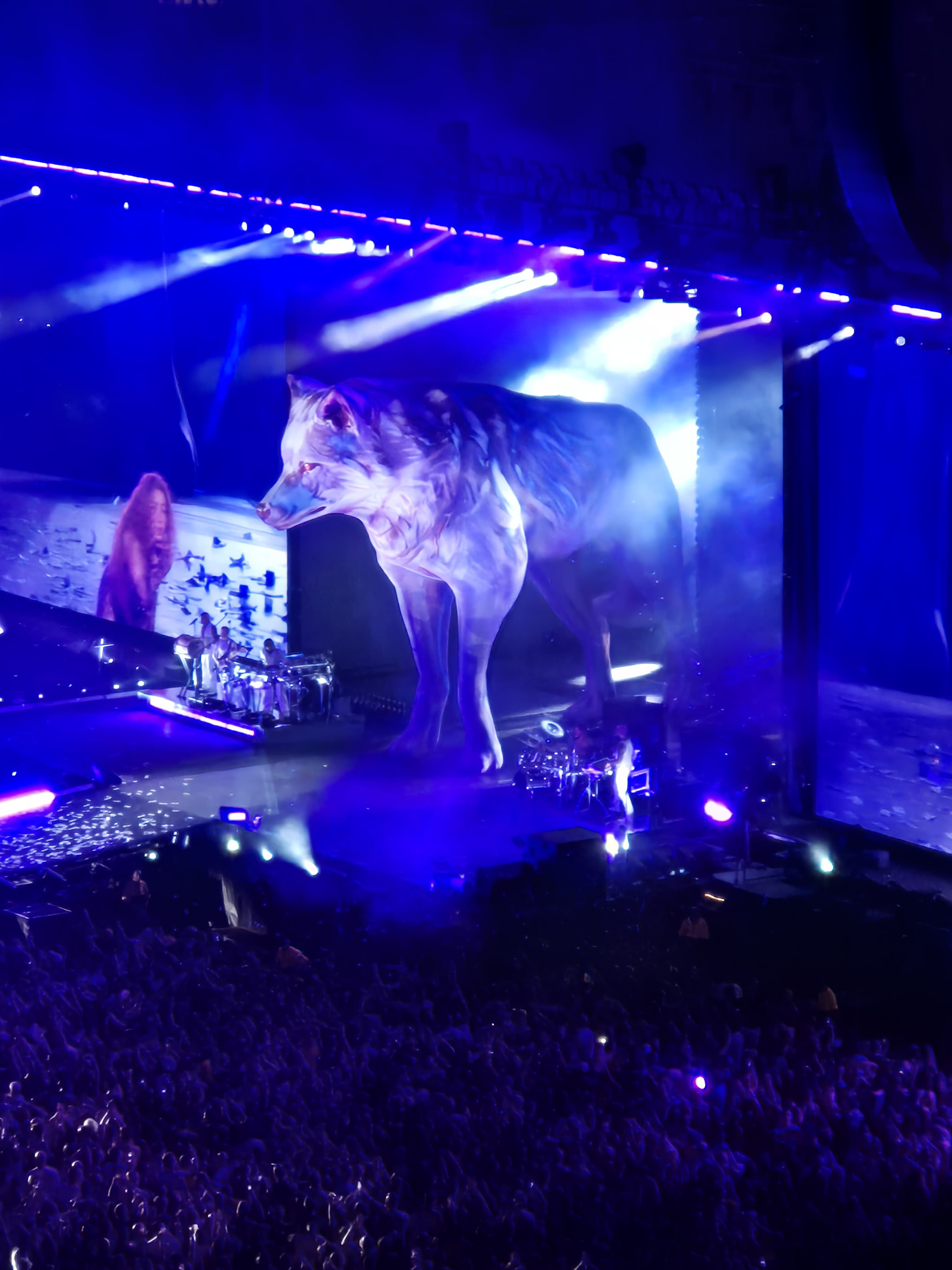
A giant wolf emerges in the final act and remains on stage throughout Shakira's performance of "She Wolf" and "BZRP Music Sessions, Vol. 53"

Rehearsals for the tour started around mid-August 2024, with Shakira announcing them with a series of pictures through her social networks. On another teaser from Shakira through Instagram, aimed at Latin America, the singer performs at Electric Air Studios a new arrangement for her 1997 single "Antología," accompanied by her longtime collaborator, Luis Fernando Ochoa. In late October, Shakira posted, also through her Instagram account, another teaser video, this time aimed at North America, singing at the same aforementioned studio her 1996 hit single "Pies Descalzos, Sueños Blancos." During an interview for Brazilian website GShow, Shakira revealed the latter song, plus other signature hits of hers, such as "Estoy Aquí" and "Waka Waka (This Time for Africa)", would be included to the set list, with the tour being described by herself as "the biggest show of [her] career, the most comprehensible one," whose rehearsals include a daily 12-14 hour full schedule of preparations along with her crew, to perform "these most, most relevant concerts of [her] musical lifetime." Later on, she also revealed the members for her band, most of them already longtime collaborators of her, such as musical director and guitarist Tim Mitchell, drummer Brendan Buckley and piano and keyboard player Albert Menéndez, with also the addition of bass player Donald Alford II.

In an interview for GQ España, Shakira has described the current process of her tour: "It's the most ambitious tour of my entire career, the biggest production I've had so far. Not because the public asks for it, but because I deserve it after so many years working in this world. I deserve the tour of my life. I'm throwing the house out the window. I am happy because I will be able to take a tour of the different stages of my artistic life, until today. It will be the longest show I’ve ever done with the biggest screen and everything you can imagine. More is more and better!"

On 21 January 2025, Shakira moved from the USA to Mexico to finish her last rehearsals before tour properly kicks off in Rio de Janeiro, Brazil. Shakira was actively involved in the production, ensuring that every element reflected her "vision". The on-screen visuals were created using artificial intelligence and CGI technology. 45 people worked on them, including companies Blink and Los Angeles-based creative studio Actual Objects. The visuals included a realistic projection of the singer. Artist Isabella Mebarak claimed that a likeness analysis of the singer was conducted to resemble her features. The "first of its kind" AI/CGI animated version of Shakira is shown during the interludes. The tour features an "elaborate production", including 160’ screens and a diverse set of props, such as a pole attached to a giant "S" used during the "Soltera" performance. This set element was constructed by specialty fabricators ShowFab. According to Chilean media outlet Culto, the cost of producing each concert is estimated to be more than US$3 million. Preparations lasted about 10 months. Attire and accessories were mostly custom-made by fashion houses and designers, such as Indian Anamika Khanna and Atelier Versace. Shakira worked with company Yellow Studio to design "a stage that evolves along with the show". The stage includes hydraulic platforms and a 25-meter ramp. The creative direction for the stage was handled by the Squared Division.

== Critical reception ==
Olivia Petty of The San Diego Union-Tribune praised Shakira's performance and versatility, but criticized the on-screen visuals, stating that the "AI-generated visuals that filled the transitions between some songs left much to be desired, feeling out of place and generally unappealing to the eye."

== Ticket sales ==
In North America, during the pre-sale period of Shakira's North American arena leg, the tickets of most of the shows were sold out. The tickets vary widely in prices, between circa $200 and $2000 (excluding VIP or other add-on tickets), depending on the cities. Due to overwhelming demand, Shakira added extra shows in Palm Springs, Miami and New York City. Meanwhile, her shows in Phoenix, Inglewood, San Antonio, Dallas, Charlotte, Washington DC, and Chicago were mostly sold out. In Miami, she was supposed to extend the record of being the female artist to perform most shows in Kaseya Center, 11 in total. However, the whole leg was moved to May 2025 due to Live Nation's decision to upgrade the several North American shows to stadiums.

In Argentina, Peru and Chile, she broke the record by selling all the tickets in 40 minutes. With multiple shows completely sold out, new dates were promptly added to several cities. In Colombia, the second stadium date in Bogotá was sold out in 1.5 hours. In Barranquilla, Shakira moved the first show date from February 21 to 20 because it clashed with La Guacherna. However, the first date was quickly sold out due to high demand, which prompted the city's mayor, Alex Char, to announce that the carnival celebration would be moved to February 22, so a second date could be scheduled. In total, two million fans registered for the ticket notification. The singer promised she will bring the tour to most of the Latin American countries due to the overwhelming demand.

In Mexico City, she is the first female artist to perform seven sold-out shows at Estadio GNP Seguros, breaking the record previously held by Taylor Swift with four. She is also the first artist to ever perform seven shows of the same tour at the venue, breaking the record previously held by RBD with six. The stadium is named as "Shakira stadium" on Google Maps, honoring her record-breaking achievement. In an article, Billboard claimed the seven shows in Mexico City would gather crowds of "about 455,000 people in total". Ticketmaster Mexico reported that 2.5 million people visited its website to search for tickets to Shakira’s concerts since the tour was announced in the country last October.

== Commercial performance ==
=== Box office ===
Live Nation reported that in less than two hours of sale in Latin America, 950,000 tickets were sold across 18 stadiums, which broke the all-time record for ticket sales among female artists. With more than 30 shows ahead, Live Nation revealed on 17 March 2025 that more than two million tickets have already been sold. In March 2025, Billboard reported that $32.9 million were made from the first six shows, which had sold over 282,000 tickets. The outlet also projected the tour to finish with over $200 million in total grosses with shows announced as of 27 March 2025. In May 2025, Billboard published their midyear report, covering concerts, including her first seven nights at Estadio GNP Seguros that March.

Additional reports in May were made, as well as in the months of June, July, and September 2025. In October 2025, Billboard reported the tour had earned US$327.4 million and an attendance of 2.5 million within its first 64 concerts. making it the highest-grossing Latin tour ever by a woman ever, as well as the second highest-grossing Latin tour ever. In their year-end report for 2025, Billboard recognized the tour as the fifth-best tour of the year. Similarly, Pollstar named the tour as the fifth-most lucrative tour of 2025, with an average gross of US$5 million based on 64 reported shows.

In January 2026, Billboard reported that $35.7 million was generated from ten concerts, with an attendance of 267,000 also noted. Individual reports regarding the December 2025 concerts in Buenos Aires and Montevideo were also provided. They further reported the tour had generated US$421.6 million and attracted an audience of 3.3 million over its first 86 concerts, setting a new Guinness World Record for the highest-grossing Latin tour in history. That October, Billboard named the tour as the highest-grossing Latin tour in boxscore history.

=== Venue records ===
Venue records
Dates	Venue	Country	Description	Ref.
11 February 2025	Estádio Olímpico Nilton Santos	Brazil	First Spanish speaking act to perform a solo show on a single tour.	
13 February 2025	Estádio do Morumbi	Brazil	The first Spanish speaking act to ever perform in the stadium	
13 February 2025	Estádio do Morumbi	Brazil	The first Spanish speaking act to perform in the stadium with two different tours	
13 February 2025	Estádio do Morumbi	Brazil	Biggest day attendance in 21st century by a solo female artist (65,922)	
13 February 2025	Estádio do Morumbi	Brazil	Highest-grossing boxscore report for one single night in the stadium's history as a female artist.	
17 February, 15 (Note: The 15 November 2025 concert in Lima was originally scheduled for 16 February 2025, but was rescheduled due to hospitalization.)–16, 18 November 2025	Estadio Nacional	Peru	First female act to perform more than two solo shows on a single tour.	
17 February, 15–16, 18 November 2025	Estadio Nacional	Peru	Fastest ticket sales ever in Peru as a female artist (40 minutes).	
20–21 February 2025	Estadio Metropolitano Roberto Meléndez	Colombia	First female act to perform two shows on a single tour.	
20–21 February 2025	Estadio Metropolitano Roberto Meléndez	Colombia	Most career shows by a solo act (five concerts throughout her career).	
20–21 February 2025	Estadio Metropolitano Roberto Meléndez	Colombia	Biggest two-day attendance by a solo female artist (97,873)	
20–21 February 2025	Estadio Metropolitano Roberto Meléndez	Colombia	Highest-grossing boxscore report in the stadium's history.	
24 February (Note: The concert on 13 April 2025 in Medellín was originally scheduled for 23 February 2025; it was rescheduled for 24 February 2025 to avoid scheduling conflicts within the venue and was rescheduled again due to stage collapse and logistical issues.) 2025	Estadio Atanasio Girardot	Colombia	Most career shows by a female solo act (three concerts throughout her career).	
26–27 February 2025	Estadio El Campín	Colombia	Most career shows by a solo act (eight concerts throughout her career).	
26–27 February 2025	Estadio El Campín	Colombia	Biggest two-day attendance as a female artist (82,897)	
26–27 February 2025	Estadio El Campín	Colombia	Highest-grossing boxscore report in the stadium's history.	
2-3 March (Note: The 4 and 5 April 2025 concerts in Santiago were originally scheduled for 2 and 3 March 2025 at the main field of the Estadio Nacional Julio Martínez Prádanos, but were rescheduled due to production issues, caused by unevenness with the stadium's field. The concerts took place at the park outside the same venue.) 2025	Estadio Nacional Julio Martínez Prádanos	Chile	Fastest ticket sales ever in Chile as a female artist (40 minutes).	
2-3 March 2025	Estadio Nacional Julio Martínez Prádanos	Chile	Most career shows by a solo act (seven concerts throughout her career).	
7–8 March 2025	Campo Argentino de Polo	Argentina	Fastest ticket sales ever in Argentina as a female artist (40 minutes).	
7–8 March 2025	Campo Argentino de Polo	Argentina	Most career shows by a solo act (three concerts throughout her career).	
12–13 March 2025	Estadio BBVA	Mexico	First female act to perform in the stadium; first female act to perform two shows on a single tour.	
12–13 March 2025	Estadio BBVA	Mexico	Most career shows by a female solo act (two concerts throughout her career).	
16–17 March 2025	Estadio Akron	Mexico	First female act to perform two shows on a single tour.	
16–17 March 2025	Estadio Akron	Mexico	Most career shows by a solo act (two concerts throughout her career).	
19, 21, 23, 25, 27–28, 30 March, 26–27, 29–30 August, 18 September 2025; 27 February 2026	Estadio GNP Seguros	Mexico	First female act to perform five to twelve shows on a single tour.	
19, 21, 23, 25, 27–28, 30 March, 26–27, 29–30 August, 18 September 2025; 27 February 2026	Estadio GNP Seguros	Mexico	Most career shows by a solo act (seventeen concerts throughout her career).	
19, 21, 23, 25, 27–28, 30 March, 26–27, 29–30 August, 18 September 2025; 27 February 2026	Estadio GNP Seguros	Mexico	First female tour with more than ten stadium shows in a single city.	
13 May 2025	Bank of America Stadium	United States	First Latin act to headline a concert.	
13 May 2025	Bank of America Stadium	United States	First Latin female act to perform a show in the venue.	
20 May 2025	Fenway Park	United States	First Latin female act to headline a concert.	
11 June 2025	Globe Life Field	United States	First Latin female act to headline a concert.	
26 June 2025	Snapdragon Stadium	United States	First Latin act to headline a concert.	
30 June 2025	Oracle Park	United States	First Latin act to headline a concert.	
7 August 2025	Valley Children’s Stadium	United States	First musician to ever hold a concert at the stadium.	

== Impact ==
=== Economy, commerce and local business ===
In January 2025, LATAM Airlines Group's Brazilian branding announced an additional flight on 12 February of the same year, from Confins Airport to Guarulhos Airport ahead of Shakira's concert the following day, to accommodate the increase in passenger demand. That same month, their Colombian branding added eight additional flights to Barranquilla, from Bogotá and Medellín, to meet the demand for Shakira’s concert and the carnival in her hometown. In a press release, Brazilian travel agency Decolar reported a 67% increase in demand for flights to Rio de Janeiro and a 24% increase in demand for flights to São Paulo during the period of the singer's shows in those cities in relation to the same periods in 2024.

In Mexico, the tour also set a historic precedent by boosting tourism and generating millions in economic revenue across the three major cities of the country. According to data from Ticketmaster, between 30% and 40% of attendees at Shakira’s concerts in Mexico travel from another state in the country to one of the three cities hosting the shows, as well as international travelers from the United States, El Salvador, Colombia, and Peru. In Monterrey, the hotel demand was increased by 66%. In Guadalajara, the two shows led to double hotel occupancy, with approximately 40,000 rooms booked per night. This generated around 80 million pesos (about $4 million) in direct hotel revenue and contributed an estimated 900 million pesos (around $44.4 million) in total tourism revenue. The seven sold-out shows at Estadio GNP Seguros are projected to have an economic impact of 5.5 billion pesos (around $275 million), according to the CDMX Secretariat of Tourism, as reported by Billboard Español.

Barranquilla's local government estimated that Shakira's shows generated Col$66.8 billion in "economic movement", of which Col$18 billion were "irrigated" by a chain of transactions of local businesses in the city. The Oxford Economics study took into account the subsequent purchases of products and services derived from tourism activities such as hotels, gastronomy, transportation, commerce and services. According to Forbes Colombia, the singer's shows in the country generated an economic impact of approximately Col$206 billion ($US49,6 million).

According to Billboard, the first seven sold out shows in Mexico City generated around 20,000 jobs in logistics, security, transportation, and production, benefiting workers across various sectors such as hospitality, restaurants, and airlines, as well as street vendors and small businesses near the venues. In July 2025, Shakira pledged to donate a portion of the proceeds from her 5 July concert in San Antonio to Hill Country disaster relief fund following the floods in Central Texas.

In May 2026, following her performance at Todo Mundo no Rio in Copacabana, Rio de Janeiro, Rolling Stone reported that an estimated US$150 million in tourism revenue had been generated.

=== Honors ===
- After finishing off her two sold out shows in Barranquilla, the mayor of the city Alejandro Char decided to honor Shakira by changing one of the main roads in the city, Avenida 72 to Avenida Shakira. According to the mayor, this initiative seeks to honor the artist's career and highlight her impact on the culture and international recognition of Barranquilla.

== Controversy ==
=== Cancellations and postponements ===
Several media outlets noted the high number of cancelled and postponed shows during the North American and Latin American legs of the tour, citing "production and logistic issues". The last-minute suspensions of shows in Medellín and Santiago, as well as cancellations in Boston and Washington, D.C., stirred controversy and speculation. In response to the cancellation in Washington, D.C., which was to be part of WorldPride, Mayor Muriel Bowser shared a public message to the singer, telling her to "get yourself here". Following the postponement of the 13 June concert in San Antonio, fans cited their frustration with the lack of communication regarding the cancellation, which happened less than one-hour prior to show time.

Following the postponement of the 20 June concert in Inglewood, California, due to the June 2025 Los Angeles protests, fans spoke out against the continued lack of communication from the singer. Preceding the cancellation of the 26 September show in Santo Domingo, Dominican Republic, which was originally rescheduled from 2 April, fans expressed concern about the lack of information as advertising for the event had been withdrawn from the media and public spaces in the prior weeks.

=== Animal abuse by Barranquilla City Council ===
Several Colombian animal rights advocates denounced that more than 100 stray cats that used to live in the surroundings of Estadio Metropolitano Roberto Meléndez were allegedly killed by the Alejandro Char administration days prior Shakira's concerts at the venue, in an effort to "embellish" the city for tourists.

== Set list ==
This set list is from the 11 February 2025 concert in Rio de Janeiro.

1. Intro (Caloris)
2. "La Fuerte"
3. "Girl Like Me"
4. "Las de la Intuición"
5. "Estoy Aquí"
6. "Empire"
7. "Inevitable"
8. "Te Felicito"
9. "TQG"
10. "Don't Bother"
11. "Acróstico"
12. "Copa Vacía"
13. "La Bicicleta"
14. "La Tortura"
15. "Hips Don't Lie"
16. "Chantaje"
17. "Monotonía"
18. "Addicted to You"
19. "Loca"
20. "Soltera"
21. "Cómo Dónde y Cuándo"
22. "Última" / "Ojos Así"
23. "Pies Descalzos, Sueños Blancos"
24. "Mama África" (Chico César cover)
25. "Antología"
26. "Poem to a Horse"
27. "Objection (Tango)"
28. "Whenever, Wherever"
29. "Waka Waka (This Time for Africa)"
30. "She Wolf"
31. "Shakira: Bzrp Music Sessions, Vol. 53"

=== Alterations ===
- During the 20 February 2025 concert in Barranquilla, "Te Olvidé" was performed with Chelito de Castro, and special guest Tatiana Angulo Fernández. She also performed a mashup of "Chantaje" and "En Barranquilla me quedo".
- During the 19 March 2025 concert in Mexico Cty, "Ciega, Sordomuda" and "El Jefe" were performed.
- During the 25 March 2025 concert in Mexico City, "Ciega, Sordomuda" and "El Jefe" were performed, and "(Entre Paréntesis)" was performed with Grupo Frontera.
- During the 12 April 2025 concert in Medellin, "Chantaje" was performed with Maluma.
- Beginning with the 13 May 2025 concert in Charlotte, "Underneath Your Clothes" was added to the set list; additionally, "La Tortura" was performed with Alejandro Sanz, and "Hips Don't Lie" with Wyclef Jean, respectively.
- During the 15 May 2025 concert in East Rutherford, "Monotonía" was performed with Ozuna.
- During the 16 May 2025 concert in East Rutherford, "Te Felicito" was performed with Rauw Alejandro.
- During the 20 May 2025 concert in Montreal, "Je l'aime à mourir" by Francis Cabrel was performed.
- During the 6 June 2025 concert in Miami Gardens (Note: Billed as Miami.), Shakira performed the following collaboration: "La Tortura" with Sanz, "Monotonía" with Ozuna, and "Copa Vacía" with Manuel Turizo.
- During the 22 June 2025 concert in Phoenix, "Si Te Vas" was performed.
- During the 4 August 2025 concert in Inglewood, "Men in This Town" was performed.
- During the 26 August and 18 September 2025 concerts in Mexico City, "Soltera" was performed with Danna.
- During the 30 August 2025 concert in Mexico City, "Día de Enero" was performed with Belinda.
- During the 25 October 2025 concert in Cali, "Sin Sentimiento" was performed with Grupo Niche.
- During the 1 November 2025 concert in Bogotá, "La Pared" was performed with the Bogotá Philharmonic Orchestra.
- During the 15, 16 and 18 November 2025 concerts in Lima, "La Pared" was performed with the Lima Philharmonic Orchestra.
- During the 8 December 2025 concert in Buenos Aires, "Día Especial" was performed in tribute to Gustavo Cerati, which featured an AI-generated video of Cerati.
- During the 2 May 2026 concert in Rio de Janeiro:
  - "Monotonía", "Addicted to You", "Mama África", and "Poem to a Horse" were omitted from the set list.
  - "Choka Choka" was performed with Anitta
  - "Can't Remember to Forget You" was performed
  - "O Leãozinho" was performed with Caetano Veloso
  - "O que é, o que é" was performed Maria Bethânia
  - "País Tropical" was performed with Ivete Sangalo
- During the 13 June and 14 June 2026 concerts in Inglewood, "Dai Dai" and "Zoo" were performed.
- During the 20 June 2026 concert in New York City, "Hips Don't Lie" was performed with Tyla.
- During the 18 September 2026 concert in Madrid, "Te Dejo Madrid" was performed.

== Broadcast ==
In September 2026, it was announced that the 3 October 2026 concert in Madrid, Spain, would be livestreamed via Amazon Music. The concert, titled Shakira Live from Madrid Presented by Amazon Music, was presented as part of Amazon's Women Shaping Latin Music iniative, which promotes "the work of female artists who've paved the way for other female artists".

== Tour dates ==
List of 2025 concerts
Date (2025)	City	Country	Venue	Supporting act	Attendance	Revenue
11 February	Rio de Janeiro	Brazil	Estádio Olímpico Nilton Santos	Dennis	35,180 / 35,180	$2,896,941
13 February	São Paulo	Brazil	Estádio do Morumbi	—N/a	65,922 / 65,922	$6,444,211
17 February	Lima	Peru	Estadio Nacional	—N/a	47,674 / 47,674	$6,626,028
20 February (Note: The 20 February 2025 concert in Barranquilla was originally scheduled on 21 February 2025, but was changed to avoid scheduling conflicts with the La Guacherna 2025. An "exclusive and unique performance" from the concert aired as part of the Lo Nuestro Awards.)	Barranquilla	Colombia	Estadio Metropolitano Roberto Meléndez	—N/a	97,873 / 97,873	$11,263,570
21 February (Note: The 21 February 2025 concert in Barranquilla was made possible to be added with the decision and subsequent announcement by the town's mayor, Alex Char, of making the replacement of the date originally scheduled for La Guacherna 2025 to one day later, on 22 February 2025.)	Barranquilla	Colombia	Estadio Metropolitano Roberto Meléndez	—N/a	97,873 / 97,873	$11,263,570
26 February	Bogotá	Colombia	Estadio El Campín	—N/a	82,897 / 82,897	$12,309,377
27 February	Bogotá	Colombia	Estadio El Campín	—N/a	82,897 / 82,897	$12,309,377
7 March	Buenos Aires	Argentina	Campo Argentino de Polo	Natalie Pérez	115,000 / 115,000	$13,250,843
8 March	Buenos Aires	Argentina	Campo Argentino de Polo	Natalie Pérez	115,000 / 115,000	$13,250,843
12 March	Guadalupe (Note: Billed as Monterrey.)	Mexico	Estadio BBVA	—N/a	88,201 / 88,201	$12,453,145
13 March	Guadalupe	Mexico	Estadio BBVA	—N/a	88,201 / 88,201	$12,453,145
16 March	Zapopan (Note: Billed as Guadalajara.)	Mexico	Estadio Akron	—N/a	70,264 / 70,264	$11,539,806
17 March	Zapopan	Mexico	Estadio Akron	—N/a	70,264 / 70,264	$11,539,806
19 March	Mexico City	Mexico	Estadio GNP Seguros	—N/a	668,327 / 668,327 (Note: The concerts in Mexico City on 19–30 March, 26–30 August, and 18 September 2025 had their data combined into a single boxscore, according to OCESA and as reported by Billboard. 100% attendance reporting taken from Pollstar.)	$76,018,118
21 March	Mexico City	Mexico	Estadio GNP Seguros	—N/a	668,327 / 668,327	$76,018,118
23 March	Mexico City	Mexico	Estadio GNP Seguros	—N/a	668,327 / 668,327	$76,018,118
25 March	Mexico City	Mexico	Estadio GNP Seguros	—N/a	668,327 / 668,327	$76,018,118
27 March	Mexico City	Mexico	Estadio GNP Seguros	—N/a	668,327 / 668,327	$76,018,118
28 March	Mexico City	Mexico	Estadio GNP Seguros	—N/a	668,327 / 668,327	$76,018,118
30 March	Mexico City	Mexico	Estadio GNP Seguros	—N/a	668,327 / 668,327	$76,018,118
4 April	Santiago	Chile	Estadio Nacional Sports Park	Antonella Sigala	131,985 / 131,985	$14,237,591
5 April	Santiago	Chile	Estadio Nacional Sports Park	Antonella Sigala	131,985 / 131,985	$14,237,591
7 April	Santiago	Chile	Estadio Nacional Sports Park	Antonella Sigala	131,985 / 131,985	$14,237,591
12 April	Medellín	Colombia	Estadio Atanasio Girardot	Gale	73,217 / 73,217	$7,503,853
13 April	Medellín	Colombia	Estadio Atanasio Girardot	Gale	73,217 / 73,217	$7,503,853
13 May (Note: The 13 May 2025 concert in Charlotte was originally scheduled for 23 November 2024 at Spectrum Center, but was rescheduled with a new venue due to "overwhelming" demand.)	Charlotte	United States	Bank of America Stadium	Wyclef Jean	47,406 / 47,406	$4,454,350
15 May (Note: The 15 May 2025 concert in East Rutherford was originally scheduled for 5 December and 6 December 2024 at Barclays Center, but was rescheduled with a new venue due to "overwhelming" demand.)	East Rutherford	United States	MetLife Stadium	—N/a	99,876 / 99,876	$13,798,380
16 May	East Rutherford	United States	MetLife Stadium	Pitbull	99,876 / 99,876	$13,798,380
20 May (Note: The 20 May 2025 concert in Montreal was originally scheduled for 10 December 2024, but was postponed due to production changes.)	Montreal	Canada	Bell Centre	—N/a	13,224 / 13,224	$2,444,413
22 May (Note: The 22 May 2025 concert in Detroit was originally scheduled for 15 December 2024, but was postponed due to production changes.)	Detroit	United States	Little Caesars Arena	—N/a	13,034 / 13,034	$2,202,308
24 May (Note: The 24 May 2025 concert in Chicago is part of the Sueños Music Festival.)	Chicago	United States	Grant Park	—N/a	—N/a	
26 May (Note: The 26 May 2025 concert in Toronto was originally scheduled for 30 November 2024, but was postponed due to production changes.)	Toronto	Canada	Scotiabank Arena	—N/a	13,458 / 13,458	$2,888,000
2 June	Atlanta	United States	State Farm Arena	—N/a	11,371 / 11,371	$2,588,638
4 June	Orlando	United States	Camping World Stadium	—N/a	45,182 / 45,182	$6,277,851
6 June (Note: The 6 June 2025 concert in Miami Gardens was originally scheduled for 20 November and 21 November 2024 at Kaseya Center, but was rescheduled with a new venue due to "overwhelming" demand.)	Miami Gardens	United States	Hard Rock Stadium	—N/a	85,840 / 85,840	$13,173,719
7 June	Miami Gardens	United States	Hard Rock Stadium	—N/a	85,840 / 85,840	$13,173,719
11 June (Note: The 11 June 2025 concert in Arlington was originally scheduled for 17 November 2024 at American Airlines Center, but was rescheduled with a new venue due to "overwhelming" demand.)	Arlington	United States	Globe Life Field	—N/a	38,534 / 38,534	$5,138,848
15 June	Houston	United States	Toyota Center	—N/a	22,101 / 22,101	$4,629,511
16 June	Houston	United States	Toyota Center	—N/a	22,101 / 22,101	$4,629,511
22 June (Note: The 22 June 2025 concert in Phoenix was originally scheduled for 7 November 2024, but was rescheduled due to production changes.)	Phoenix	United States	PHX Arena	—N/a	23,016 / 23,016	$5,635,838
23 June	Phoenix	United States	PHX Arena	—N/a	23,016 / 23,016	$5,635,838
26 June	San Diego	United States	Snapdragon Stadium	—N/a	28,630 / 28,630	$5,241,515
28 June	Paradise (Note: Billed as Las Vegas.)	United States	Allegiant Stadium	—N/a	47,058 / 47,058	$6,677,413
30 June	San Francisco	United States	Oracle Park	—N/a	35,431 / 35,431	$6,561,645
5 July (Note: The 5 July 2025 concert in San Antonio was first scheduled for 16 November 2024 at Frost Bank Center, but was rescheduled with a new venue due to "overwhelming" demand, and was rescheduled a second time, due to structural issues.)	San Antonio	United States	Alamodome	—N/a	46,350 / 46,350	$6,573,453
4 August (Note: The 4 August 2025 concert in Inglewood was first scheduled for 9 November 2024 at Kia Forum, but was rescheduled to 20 June 2025 at SoFi Stadium due to "overwhelming" demand, and was rescheduled a second time, due to the June 2025 Los Angeles protests.)	Inglewood	United States	SoFi Stadium	Black Eyed Peas	92,239 / 92,239	$10,601,486
5 August	Inglewood	United States	SoFi Stadium	Black Eyed Peas	92,239 / 92,239	$10,601,486
7 August	Fresno	United States	Valley Children's Stadium	—N/a	27,835 / 27,835	$2,709,871
11 August	Tijuana	Mexico	Estadio Caliente	—N/a	35,536 / 35,536	$4,084,602
14 August	Hermosillo	Mexico	Estadio Héroe de Nacozari	—N/a	26,782 / 26,782	$3,156,924
17 August	Chihuahua	Mexico	Estadio UACH	—N/a	32,503 / 32,503	$4,701,539
20 August	Torreón	Mexico	Estadio Corona	Pitbull	29,573 / 29,573	$4,156,343
23 August	Monterrey	Mexico	Parque Fundidora	—N/a	29,311 / 29,311	$4,171,658
26 August	Mexico City	Mexico	Estadio GNP Seguros	—N/a		
27 August	Mexico City	Mexico	Estadio GNP Seguros	—N/a		
29 August	Mexico City	Mexico	Estadio GNP Seguros	—N/a		
30 August	Mexico City	Mexico	Estadio GNP Seguros	—N/a		
2 September	Querétaro	Mexico	Estadio Corregidora	—N/a	54,068 / 54,068	$7,230,361
3 September	Querétaro	Mexico	Estadio Corregidora	—N/a	54,068 / 54,068	$7,230,361
6 September	Zapopan	Mexico	Estadio Akron	—N/a	67,435 / 67,435	$9,365,442
7 September	Zapopan	Mexico	Estadio Akron	—N/a	67,435 / 67,435	$9,365,442
11 September	Puebla	Mexico	Estadio Cuauhtémoc	—N/a	76,727 / 76,727	$8,057,898
12 September	Puebla	Mexico	Estadio Cuauhtémoc	—N/a	76,727 / 76,727	$8,057,898
18 September	Mexico City	Mexico	Estadio GNP Seguros	Gale		
24 September	Boca del Río (Note: Promoted as Veracruz in press announcement.)	Mexico	Estadio Luis "Pirata" Fuente	—N/a	29,878 / 29,878	$4,027,195
25 October	Cali	Colombia	Estadio Olímpico Pascual Guerrero	—N/a	77,875 / 77,875	$7,167,325
26 October	Cali	Colombia	Estadio Olímpico Pascual Guerrero	—N/a	77,875 / 77,875	$7,167,325
1 November	Bogotá	Colombia	Vive Claro	—N/a	44,118 / 46,180	$6,109,213
8 November	Quito	Ecuador	Estadio Olímpico Atahualpa	—N/a	101,373 / 101,373	$14,448,638
9 November	Quito	Ecuador	Estadio Olímpico Atahualpa	—N/a	101,373 / 101,373	$14,448,638
11 November	Quito	Ecuador	Estadio Olímpico Atahualpa	—N/a	101,373 / 101,373	$14,448,638
15 November	Lima	Peru	Estadio Nacional	—N/a	117,577 / 117,577	$18,267,923
16 November	Lima	Peru	Estadio Nacional	—N/a	117,577 / 117,577	$18,267,923
18 November	Lima	Peru	Estadio Nacional	—N/a	117,577 / 117,577	$18,267,923
22 November (Note: The 22 November 2025 concert in Santiago was originally set to take place at the main field of the Estadio Nacional Julio Martínez Prádanos. However, it was relocated to the Estadio Nacional Sports Park due to "logistical and operational reasons".)	Santiago	Chile	Estadio Nacional Sports Park	Denise Rosenthal	29,574 / 29,574	$3,335,277
28 November	Asunción	Paraguay	Estadio ueno La Nueva Olla	—N/a	94,768 / 105,396	$5,327,934
29 November	Asunción	Paraguay	Estadio ueno La Nueva Olla	—N/a	94,768 / 105,396	$5,327,934
3 December	Montevideo	Uruguay	Estadio Centenario	Meri Deal	104,616 / 104,616	$11,794,174
4 December	Montevideo	Uruguay	Estadio Centenario	Meri Deal	104,616 / 104,616	$11,794,174
8 December	Buenos Aires	Argentina	Jose Amalfitani Stadium	Ángela Torres	96,887 / 96,887	$12,594,967
9 December	Buenos Aires	Argentina	Jose Amalfitani Stadium	Ángela Torres	96,887 / 96,887	$12,594,967
11 December	Buenos Aires	Argentina	Jose Amalfitani Stadium	Ángela Torres	96,887 / 96,887	$12,594,967
14 December	Córdoba	Argentina	Estadio Mario Alberto Kempes	TiziShi	48,570 / 48,570	$6,878,562
15 December	Córdoba	Argentina	Estadio Mario Alberto Kempes	TiziShi	48,570 / 48,570	$6,878,562

List of 2026 concerts
Date (2026)	City	Country	Venue	Supporting act	Attendance	Revenue
7 February	San Salvador	El Salvador	Estadio Mágico González	—N/a	129,389 / 129,389	$15,488,500
8 February	San Salvador	El Salvador	Estadio Mágico González	—N/a	129,389 / 129,389	$15,488,500
12 February	San Salvador	El Salvador	Estadio Mágico González	—N/a	129,389 / 129,389	$15,488,500
14 February	San Salvador	El Salvador	Estadio Mágico González	—N/a	129,389 / 129,389	$15,488,500
15 February	San Salvador	El Salvador	Estadio Mágico González	—N/a	129,389 / 129,389	$15,488,500
21 February	Tuxtla Gutiérrez	Mexico	Estadio Víctor Manuel Reyna	—N/a	29,716 / 36,995	$3,627,725
24 February	Mérida	Mexico	Estadio Carlos Iturralde	—N/a	33,314 / 33,987	$6,302,352
27 February	Mexico City	Mexico	Estadio GNP Seguros	—N/a	55,709 / 56,948	$8,066,986
1 March (Note: The concert on 1 March 2026 was a free access show.)	Mexico City	Mexico	Zócalo	—N/a		
2 May (Note: The concert on 2 May 2026 was a free access show as a part of Todo Mundo no Rio.)	Rio de Janeiro	Brazil	Copacabana Beach	—N/a	2,000,000 (Note: Attributed to multiple sources:)	–
13 June	Inglewood	United States	Intuit Dome	—N/a	32,484 / 32,484	$3,283,838
14 June	Inglewood	United States	Intuit Dome	—N/a	32,484 / 32,484	$3,283,838
17 June	Thousand Palms (Note: Promoted as Palm Desert in press announcement.)	United States	Acrisure Arena	—N/a	8,951 / 8,951	$1,415,999
19 June	San Jose	United States	SAP Center	—N/a	22,062 / 22,062	$3,753,300
20 June	San Jose	United States	SAP Center	—N/a	22,062 / 22,062	$3,753,300
23 June	Dallas	United States	American Airlines Center	—N/a	10,630 / 10,630	$1,866,815
26 June	Atlanta	United States	State Farm Arena	—N/a	18,150 / 21,552	$2,088,241
28 June	Atlanta	United States	State Farm Arena	—N/a	18,150 / 21,552	$2,088,241
1 July	Miami	United States	Kaseya Center	—N/a	21,037 / 21,037	$3,745,723
2 July	Miami	United States	Kaseya Center	—N/a	21,037 / 21,037	$3,745,723
6 July	Baltimore	United States	CFG Bank Arena	—N/a	10,727 / 10,727	$1,842,100
10 July	Boston	United States	TD Garden	—N/a	22,160 / 23,064	$3,383,296
11 July	Boston	United States	TD Garden	—N/a	22,160 / 23,064	$3,383,296
14 July	Newark	United States	Prudential Center	—N/a	10,809 / 10,809	$1,747,573
20 July	New York City (Note: Billed and promoted as Brooklyn in press announcement.)	United States	Barclays Center	—N/a	24,577 / 24,577	$3,273,435
21 July	New York City	United States	Barclays Center	—N/a	24,577 / 24,577	$3,273,435
23 July	Elmont (Note: Promoted as Belmont Park in press announcement.)	United States	UBS Arena	—N/a	13,373 / 13,373	$2,026,354
25 July	Atlantic City	United States	Boardwalk Hall	—N/a	11,506 / 11,506	$1,801,107
18 September	Madrid	Spain	Shakira Stadium	—N/a	655,853 / 655,853	$89,106,148
19 September	Madrid	Spain	Shakira Stadium	—N/a	655,853 / 655,853	$89,106,148
20 September	Madrid	Spain	Shakira Stadium	—N/a	655,853 / 655,853	$89,106,148
25 September	Madrid	Spain	Shakira Stadium	—N/a	655,853 / 655,853	$89,106,148
26 September	Madrid	Spain	Shakira Stadium	—N/a	655,853 / 655,853	$89,106,148
27 September	Madrid	Spain	Shakira Stadium	—N/a	655,853 / 655,853	$89,106,148
2 October	Madrid	Spain	Shakira Stadium	—N/a	655,853 / 655,853	$89,106,148
3 October	Madrid	Spain	Shakira Stadium	—N/a	655,853 / 655,853	$89,106,148
4 October	Madrid	Spain	Shakira Stadium	—N/a	655,853 / 655,853	$89,106,148
9 October	Madrid	Spain	Shakira Stadium	—N/a	655,853 / 655,853	$89,106,148
10 October	Madrid	Spain	Shakira Stadium	—N/a	655,853 / 655,853	$89,106,148
11 October	Madrid	Spain	Shakira Stadium	—N/a	655,853 / 655,853	$89,106,148
12 October	Madrid	Spain	Shakira Stadium	—N/a	655,853 / 655,853	$89,106,148
18 October	Bishkek	Kyrgyzstan	Bishkek Arena	—N/a	—	—

List of 2027 concerts
Date (2027)	City	Country	Venue	Supporting act	Attendance	Revenue
16 January	Caracas	Venezuela	Estadio Monumental de Caracas Simón Bolívar	—N/a	—	—
17 January	Caracas	Venezuela	Estadio Monumental de Caracas Simón Bolívar	—N/a	—	—
31 January	San José	Costa Rica	Estadio Nacional de Costa Rica	—N/a	—	—
2 April (Note: The 2 April 2027 concert was originally scheduled for 7 April 2026, and was first postponed to 28 November that same year, due to the 2026 Iran war. It was postponed again for the same reason.)	Giza	Egypt	Giza pyramid complex	—N/a	—	—
Total					4,374,743 / 4,400,931 (100%)	$563,836,189

=== Postponed shows ===
List of postponed concerts
Date (2026)	City	Country	Venue	Reason	Ref.
28 March	Aqaba	Jordan	Ayla Golf Club	—N/a	
1 April	Ras Abu Aboud (Note: Billed as Doha.)	Qatar	Stadium 974	2026 Iran war	

=== Cancelled shows ===
List of cancelled concerts
Date	City	Country	Venue	Reason	Ref.
2 November 2024	Palm Desert	United States	Acrisure Arena	Production changes and demand to upgrade from arenas to stadiums in several markets	
3 November 2024	Palm Desert	United States	Acrisure Arena	Production changes and demand to upgrade from arenas to stadiums in several markets	
17 November 2024	Dallas	United States	American Airlines Center	Production changes and demand to upgrade from arenas to stadiums in several markets	
14 December 2024	Chicago	United States	United Center	Production changes and demand to upgrade from arenas to stadiums in several markets	
29 May 2025 (Note: The 29 May 2025 concert in Boston was originally scheduled for 8 December 2024 at TD Garden, but was rescheduled with a new venue due to "overwhelming" demand.)	Boston	United States	Fenway Park	Unforeseen circumstances (Note: Per Fenway Park, the concert was cancelled due to "unforeseen circumstances"; however, reports from WCVB-TV claim the concert was cancelled by Boston Inspectional Services following rehearsals due to a "problem with the staging".)	
31 May 2025 (Note: The 31 May 2025 concert in Washington, D.C. was to be part of the WorldPride 2025 Festival.)	Washington, D.C.	United States	Nationals Park	Complications following the Boston cancellation	
26 September 2025 (Note: The 26 September 2025 concert in Santo Domingo was originally scheduled for 2 April 2025, but was rescheduled due to operational issues.)	Santo Domingo	Dominican Republic	Estadio Olímpico Félix Sánchez	Unforeseen circumstances	
21 November 2026 (Note: The 21 November 2026 concert in Abu Dhabi was originally scheduled for 4 April 2026 and was to be part of the Offlimits Music Festival. and was first postponed to the 21 November date before being cancelled in August of the same year.)	Abu Dhabi	United Arab Emirates	Etihad Park	2026 Iran war	

== See also ==
- List of Billboard Boxscore number-one concert series of the 2020s
- List of highest-grossing concert series at a single venue
- List of highest-grossing concert tours by Latin artists
- List of highest-grossing concert tours by women
- List of most-attended concert series at a single venue
- List of most-attended concert tours
