= Impact of the Las Mujeres Ya No Lloran World Tour =

Impact of Shakira's seventh concert tour

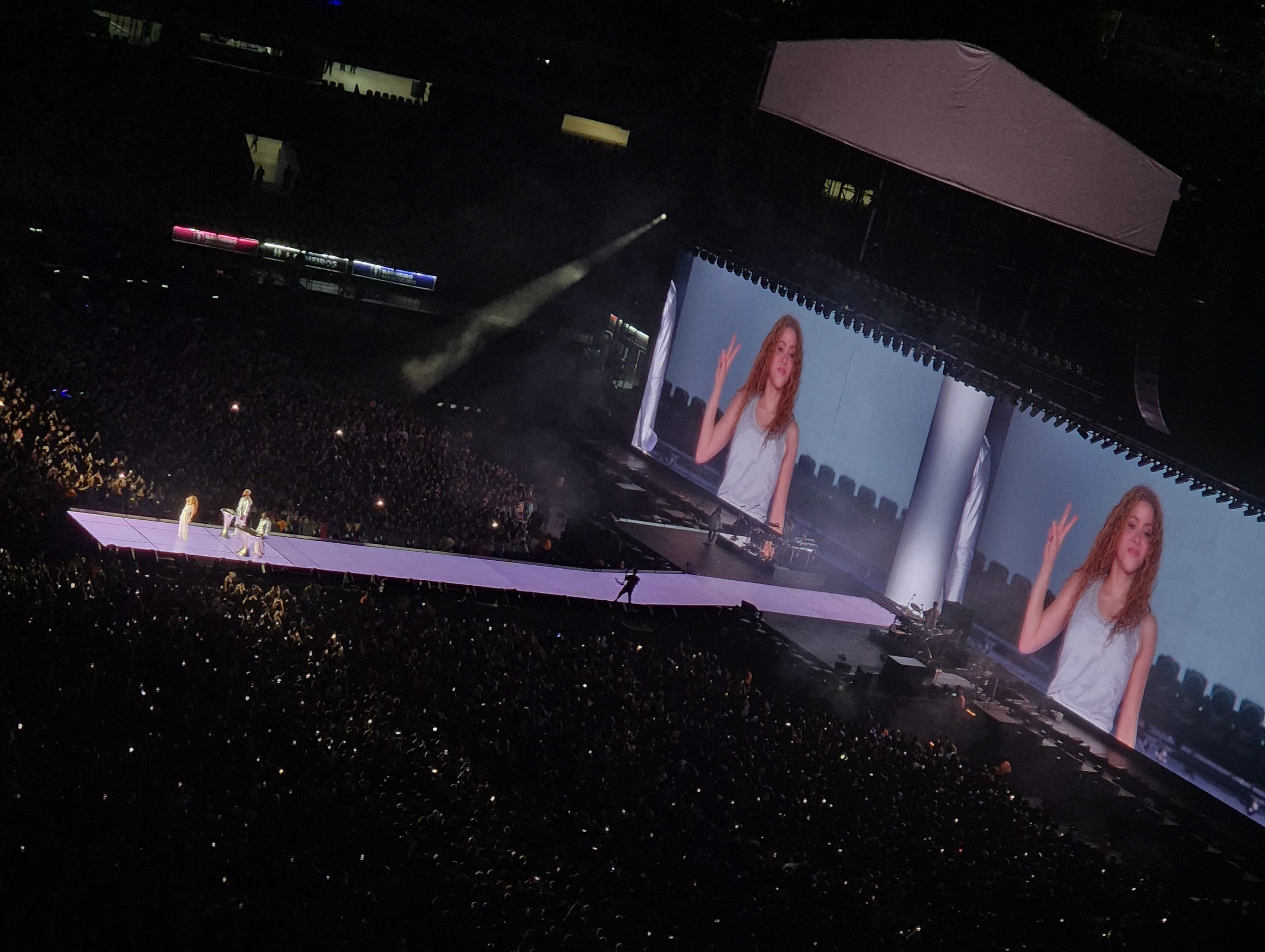
Shakira performing at the Estádio Olímpico Nilton Santos in Brazil on February 11, 2025

Various publications have analyzed the cultural, economic, and sociopolitical influence of the Las Mujeres Ya No Lloran World Tour, the 2025 concert tour by the Colombian singer Shakira, driven by massive ticket sales by her fans, known as "Shakiramanía" in Latin territory. Described as a tour with unprecedented records for a Latin American artist and an "unstoppable phenomenon," this tour marked Shakira's return to the stage after seven years with her El Dorado World Tour, and the first after the COVID-19 pandemic following a planned 2021 tour that was ultimately cancelled. It is considered a "rebirth" for the singer in popular culture after her separation from soccer player Gerard Pique in 2022. The influence of this tour across various countries highlights Shakira's significant role in popular culture.

== Demand ==
=== Americas ===
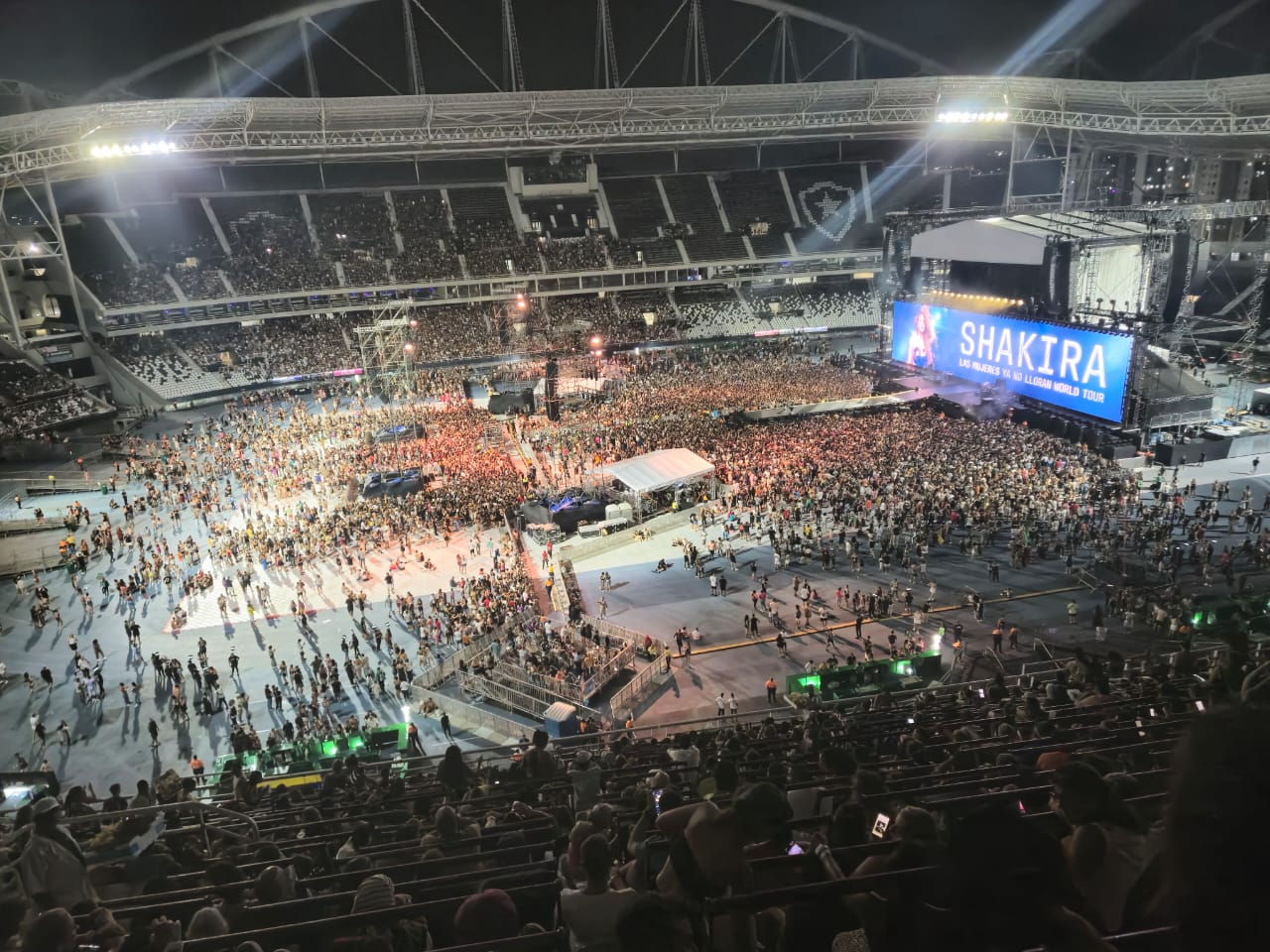
Fans in Brazil inside the stadium hours before the concert begins

==== South America ====
The tour was an exceptional success when the Latin American leg dates were announced, selling out in the first few hours. In countries like Argentina, Peru, and Chile, it broke records by selling out in just 40 minutes earning the nickname "Shakira Fever" and "Shakiramania." Due to the overwhelming demand, new dates were quickly added. In Colombia, the second matchday at the Bogotá stadium sold out in just 1.5 hours. Shakira's concerts in Colombia, due to conflict with the "La Guacherna" festival, and the high demand for the first date, ultimately led to the decision to move the Carnival date to February 22nd in order to accommodate more dates.

==== North America ====
During the pre-sale period for the North American leg of the tour, tickets for most shows sold out. Ticket prices ranged from $200 to $2,000 (excluding VIP tickets or other add-ons) depending on the city. Due to positive demand, Shakira added additional performances in Palm Springs, Miami, and New York. Meanwhile, her concerts in Phoenix, Inglewood, San Antonio, Dallas, Charlotte, Washington, D.C., and Chicago were almost completely sold out. In Miami, she extended her record for being the female artist with the most shows at the Kaseya Center, with 11 in total. However, the tour was postponed until May 2025 due to "overwhelming" demand, according to Live Nation, to move the various North American concerts to stadiums. Here, she managed to sell out Miami's Hard Rock Stadium.

== Crowd phenomena ==
=== Fanaticism ===
==== Agglomeration ====
Shakira's arrival in the countries where she would perform received extensive media coverage. In Peru, more than 4,000 fans awaited her at Jorge Chavez Airport. In Chile, she was greeted by dozens of fans outside the airport. In Argentina and Brazil, Shakira's arrival sparked a stir among her fans, who waited outside their respective airports with various gifts to give her and to sing to her. In Colombia, the mayor of Barranquilla, along with thousands of fans, had planned a welcome for Shakira with folkloric groups and Carnival costumes. Fans carried flags, posters, photographs, and clothing alluding to the artist, a so-called "mini carnival" that was just days away. This gave the city's airport a colorful and festive atmosphere. However, Shakira went directly to see her father, who was ill.

=== Scam Controversies ===
Due to the massive scale of the tour in Latin American countries, controversies arose over scams by ticket resellers. In countries like Peru, Latina Noticias reported that there were more than 15 complaints of fraud. In Colombia, a "worrying" increase in ticket resale scams was also reported. In Barranquilla, the company "Ticketiando" reported that its name was being used to sell fake tickets and defraud people. In Argentina, the VIAGOGO website received multiple complaints about scams involving ticket purchases for the Buenos Aires concert that never reached the buyers.

=== Fashion ===
Several fans wore replicas of Shakira-inspired outfits or costumes for the concert, based on her music. Glamour magazine called it "a pending task that must be completed now" and made its list of the 5 best Shakira-inspired outfits to wear. According to Peruvian media, the looks that fans in the country recreated the most were from the songs "Las De La Intuición", "She Wolf", and "Waka Waka".

In countries like Colombia, a notable element was the fashion of the public, who paid tribute to the iconic artist through their wardrobes throughout her career. The predominant colors among those in attendance were gold, silver, and black. Likewise, in the country, the OSTU brand became the official merchandise store for the tour, developing a collection of unisex clothing for adults and children, producing more than 20,000 units.

According to the newspaper El País, during her stay in Barranquilla, in the last few days, everything that was attire sought to resemble Shakira, the most notable were wigs, Arabic caderines, sparkles that looked like diamonds, among others. The called "Shakisetas" also became fashionable, a collection of five models of t-shirts inspired by different models from Shakira's career, the best-selling being "the t-shirt of all the Shakiras", managing to sell more than 200 with an expectation of 50.

In Argentina, fans arrived at the concert remembering her look primarily from the album Dónde Están los Ladrones? (1998), with hair braided with colorful ribbons and purple wigs, ties, and miniskirts like in "Las De La Intuición".

== Economy and commerce ==
=== Tourism ===
"Tourism and music have always been connected, and Shakira's return to Mexico is a clear example of how major events boost traveler mobility. At Despegar, we're seeing significant growth in searches for the cities where she'll perform, demonstrating the positive impact these shows have on the tourism industry and the local economy."

— Santiago Elijovich, Despegar.com

According to Forbes Argentina, the tour generated an increase in tourism. According to data from Booking.com, the capital saw a 10% increase in accommodation searches during the concert. Likewise, in countries like Mexico, the cities of Monterrey and Guadalajara registered increases in tourist demand of 291% and 89% respectively. A similar phenomenon occurred in Brazil, specifically in São Paulo, where Shakira's performance had a positive impact on tourism, accounting for 40% of accommodation searches. In Colombia, the impact was classified as "deeply felt."

In Barranquilla, her hometown, there was a 1,367% increase in accommodation searches. More than 85,000 people attended the concerts, of which 42% were domestic tourists and 6% were international, from countries such as Brazil, Chile, Ecuador, United States, and Mexico, her home in Barranquilla and the school where she studied saw an increase in visitors during the dates coinciding with the show. Additionally, 95% of the tourists visited the Gran Malecón, with 43,000 visitors in two days. In Bogotá, Shakira's concerts also boosted tourism. The Colombian capital recorded hotel occupancy of up to 95% during the concerts, with more than 80,000 attendees across both dates, 30% of whom were tourists. This phenomenon was dubbed by DataiFX as the "Shaki-Tourism" effect.

In Brazil, during the month of January, the Brazilian brand of LATAM Airlines Group announced an additional flight on February 12 of that year from Confins Airport to Guarulhos Airport ahead of Shakira's concert the following day, to accommodate increased passenger demand. Likewise, the brand in the country of Colombia added eight additional flights to Barranquilla, from Bogotá and Medellín, to satisfy the demand for Shakira's concert in addition to the Barranquilla carnival In a press release, Brazilian travel agency Decolar reported a 67% increase in demand for flights to Rio de Janeiro, as well as an increase in flights to São Paulo during the concert compared to last year.

=== Civil transport ===
The concert generated changes in the public transport system of several countries, in Peru due to the concert the Urban Transport Authority for Lima and Callao arranged the extension of schedules in the Metropolitan, the blue corridor and the availability of conventional transport routes and authorized taxis, the Estadio Nacional station of the Metropolitan will operate until midnight during the days of the concerts and the stations located in the north and south zones will be enabled exclusively for the disembarkation of passengers. in Colombia the TransMilenio facilitated mobility to attendees of the Shakira concert in Bogotá preparing trunk and zonal routes to ensure fast and efficient access to the El Campín stadium during the concerts, Likewise, zonal services were provided from 57th Street with diagonal 61B, with destinations towards the localities of Chapinero and Usaquén, according to LatinPyme Shakira with her tour generated a significant increase in the demand for trips through Cabify and contributing to boost urban mobility. In Nuevo León, Mexico, Metrorrey is extending its hours until 1 a.m. to facilitate transportation for those attending Shakira's concert in Monterrey.

=== Local business ===
In Barranquilla, the local government estimated that Shakira's performances generated an economic turnover of 66.8 billion Colombian pesos, of which 18 billion pesos were driven by a chain of transactions from local businesses in the city. The Oxford Economics study considered subsequent purchases of products and services derived from tourism activities such as hotels, restaurants, transportation, commerce, and services. According to Forbes Colombia, the shows held in the country generated an economic impact of approximately $206 billion Colombian pesos (US$49.6 million). According to Billboard magazine, the seven sold-out shows in Mexico City generated around 20,000 jobs in logistics, security, transportation, and production, benefiting workers across various sectors such as hospitality, restaurants, and airlines, as well as street vendors and small businesses near the venues. In countries like Peru, various media outlets reported that Shakira's concert in Lima, held on February 17, 2025, at the National Stadium, generated significant revenue from the sale of food, beverages, and merchandise, reaching more than S/. 548,000. The National Superintendency of Customs and Tax Administration (Sunat) reported that beverages led sales with S/. 379,223, followed by food with S/. 127,197, and merchandise with S/. 41,710. This data was obtained after inspections carried out at 41 points of sale during the event. In Colombia, on Mercado Libre, Shakira increased online sales by 570%, highlighting classic albums, perfumes, hairstyling kits, and her famous purple wig, which has increased sales by 40% in downtown Barranquilla. The investment exceeds $100,000 pesos per person.

=== Losses due to cancellation ===
In cities like Medellin, the cancellation of the event had a negative impact on their economy. The directors of Asoeventos pointed out that a unique opportunity to boost tourism and the local economy was lost. They also explained that the city will not receive $14 billion from the 48,000 people who attended the concert. Therefore, the president of the entity asked for the collaboration of visitors and residents of the capital of Paisa to support the businesses that were prepared for the event. The Association of Bars of Colombia pointed out that the cancellation is a hard blow to the association.

== Achievements ==
=== Venue records ===
List of venue records
Dates (2025)	Venue	Country	Description	Ref.
11 February	Estádio Olímpico Nilton Santos	Brazil	First Spanish speaking act to perform a solo show on a single tour.	
13 February	Estádio do Morumbi	Brazil	Biggest day attendance in 21st century by a solo female artist (65,922)	
13 February	Estádio do Morumbi	Brazil	Highest-grossing boxscore report for one single night in the stadium's history as a female artist.	
17 February, 15 November	Estadio Nacional	Peru	First female act to perform two solo shows on a single tour.	
17 February, 15 November	Estadio Nacional	Peru	Fastest ticket sales ever in Peru as a female artist (40 minutes).	
20–21 February	Estadio Metropolitano Roberto Meléndez	Colombia	First female act to perform two shows on a single tour.	
20–21 February	Estadio Metropolitano Roberto Meléndez	Colombia	Most career shows by a solo act (five concerts throughout her career).	
20–21 February	Estadio Metropolitano Roberto Meléndez	Colombia	Biggest two-day attendance by a solo female artist (97,873)	
20–21 February	Estadio Metropolitano Roberto Meléndez	Colombia	Highest-grossing boxscore report in the stadium's history.	
24 February	Estadio Atanasio Girardot	Colombia	Most career shows by a female solo act (three concerts throughout her career).	
26–27 February	Estadio El Campín	Colombia	Most career shows by a solo act (eight concerts throughout her career).	
26–27 February	Estadio El Campín	Colombia	Biggest two-day attendance as a female artist (82,897)	
26–27 February	Estadio El Campín	Colombia	Highest-grossing boxscore report in the stadium's history.	
2–3 March	Estadio Nacional Julio Martínez Prádanos	Chile	Fastest ticket sales ever in Chile as a female artist (40 minutes).	
2–3 March	Estadio Nacional Julio Martínez Prádanos	Chile	Most career shows by a solo act (seven concerts throughout her career).	
7–8 March	Campo Argentino de Polo	Argentina	Fastest ticket sales ever in Argentina as a female artist (40 minutes).	
7–8 March	Campo Argentino de Polo	Argentina	Most career shows by a solo act (three concerts throughout her career).	
12–13 March	Estadio BBVA	Mexico	First female act to perform in the stadium; first female act to perform two shows on a single tour.	
12–13 March	Estadio BBVA	Mexico	Most career shows by a female solo act (two concerts throughout her career).	
16–17 March	Estadio Akron	Mexico	First female act to perform two shows on a single tour.	
16–17 March	Estadio Akron	Mexico	Most career shows by a solo act (two concerts throughout her career).	
19, 21, 23, 25, 27–28, 30 March	Estadio GNP Seguros	Mexico	First female act to perform five, six and seven shows on a single tour.	
19, 21, 23, 25, 27–28, 30 March	Estadio GNP Seguros	Mexico	First act to perform seven shows on a single tour.	
19, 21, 23, 25, 27–28, 30 March	Estadio GNP Seguros	Mexico	Most career shows by a solo act (twelve concerts throughout her career).	
13 May	Bank of America Stadium	United States	First Latin act to headline a concert.	
13 May	Bank of America Stadium	United States	First Latin female act to perform a show in the venue.	
20 May	Fenway Park	United States	First Latin female act to headline a concert.	
11 June	Globe Life Field	United States	First Latin female act to headline a concert.	
26 June	Snapdragon Stadium	United States	First Latin act to headline a concert.	
30 June	Oracle Park	United States	First Latin act to headline a concert.	

=== Personal achievements ===
- Shakira peaked at No. 1 on Billboard's monthly Top Tours chart for the first time, becoming the first Latin female artist to top the chart, which was created in 2019.

== Tributes and honours ==
- During Shakira's tour in Mexico, the "Estoy Aquí Experience" museum was inaugurated for a limited period. It is located in Mexico City and operated until 30 March, coinciding with the dates of the artist's concerts. The museum has "The First Room", "Instrument Room", "Wardrobe Room", "Photography Room", "Shakira a la Mexicana" and "Official Merch".
- In Cartagena, a mural was painted in her honor by the artist Luifer Guarín. During the Barranquilla Carnival, a tribute was paid to her; on 11 January, the official presentation of the Carnival image was held on the statue of Shakira.
- After finishing her two sold-out shows in Barranquilla, Mayor Alejandro Char decided to honor Shakira by changing the name of one of the city's main roads, Avenida 72 to Avenida Shakira. According to the mayor, this initiative seeks to honor the artist's career and highlight her impact on the culture and international recognition of Barranquilla.
- During her time in El Salvador, Shakira received the Key to the City after her residency for her impact, in addition to painting a mural and decorating the host city's lights with the colors of the Colombian flag.

== Controversy ==
- Shakira received criticism from religious groups on social media accusing her of being blasphemous and attacking God due to the projection of her so-called "10 Commandments of the She-Wolfs" a set of principles that seek to empower women under the motto of authenticity and sisterhood during the "She Wolf" act of her concert.
- The tour was planned to begin in the United States in November, however, Shakira, arguing that due to demand and production, postponed more than 90% of the dates to 2025, rescheduling the dates later for stadiums, provoking negative reactions on social media from fans who traveled from various continents to see her.
- The cancellation of dates in countries like Peru, Chile, and Colombia triggered strongly negative reactions. In Chile, despite offering a small, free show on the streets, she received criticism that "it wasn't enough". In Colombia, fans wrote calling it "disrespectful."
- Several media outlets noted the amount of shows canceled during the South American leg of the tour citing "production and logistic issues". The last-minute cancellations in Medellín and Santiago stirred controversy and speculation.
- Several Colombian animal rights advocates denounced that more than 100 stray cats that used to live in the surroundings of Estadio Metropolitano Roberto Meléndez were allegedly killed by the Alejandro Char administration days prior Shakira's concerts at the venue, in an effort to "embellish" the city for tourists.

== Legacy ==
The tour, according to Spain's Los40, "is poised to continue breaking records as it progresses through the Americas, Europe, and other parts of the world. If current numbers are any indication, the Las Mujeres Ya No Lloran World Tour could redefine the standard of success for Latin artists in the entertainment industry". Likewise, Alicia Civita, an entertainment journalist in Miami, expresses that she has redefined what touring is all about for Latin artists, with a repertoire primarily of Spanish-language songs. In Peru, due to its state-of-the-art technology, impressive visual display, and unique stage presence, it was considered a turning point for entertainment. The Peninsula Qatar defined Shakira's tour as one of the most significant and talked-about comebacks in pop music history.

== Other areas ==
=== Music charts, sales and streaming ===
Following Shakira's concert in Colombia, her songs gained popularity on the country's streaming platforms. Some of the songs that rose in popularity were: "Soltera", "Antología", "TQG", "Inevitable", "Las de la Intuición", "Hips Don't Lie", "Estoy Aquí", and "La Tortura," which all achieved over 400,000 streams in 24 hours. Also during her tenure, her song "Antología" surpassed 500 million streams on Spotify, making her the first Spanish-speaking artist to have four songs from four different decades surpass 500 million streams on the platform. In countries like Mexico, the announcement of the concert tour has generated a wave of views of his songs on YouTube. During the Latin American leg of the tour, Shakira received certification plaques for her sales in the territories. In Colombia, she was recognized with various gold, platinum, and diamond certifications by Sony Music Andes, making her the Colombian artist with the most certified sales in the history of Colombian music. Likewise, in Mexico, she received a plaque with more than 28 certifications in the country. In Chile, she received two plaques: one for her physical sales in the country and another for her streaming sales. In Argentina, she received a certification plaque for her discography in the country, confirming more than 1.2 million physical sales. During the tour dates in Argentina, songs like "Inevitable" and "Día de Enero" entered the Billboard Argentina Hot 100 weekly chart. During the concert dates in Ecuador twenty-two of her songs entered the Spotify platform in the top 200 Ecuador. On November 27, 2025, prior to her dates in Paraguay, Shakira's repertoire increased on the Spotify platform, making her the first artist to have solo songs from four different decades. Her music consumption also increased on the country's Deezer and Apple Music platforms. During her stay in El Salvador, Shakira received double platinum certifications for her album Las Mujeres Ya No Lloran.
