= List of highest-grossing concert tours by women =

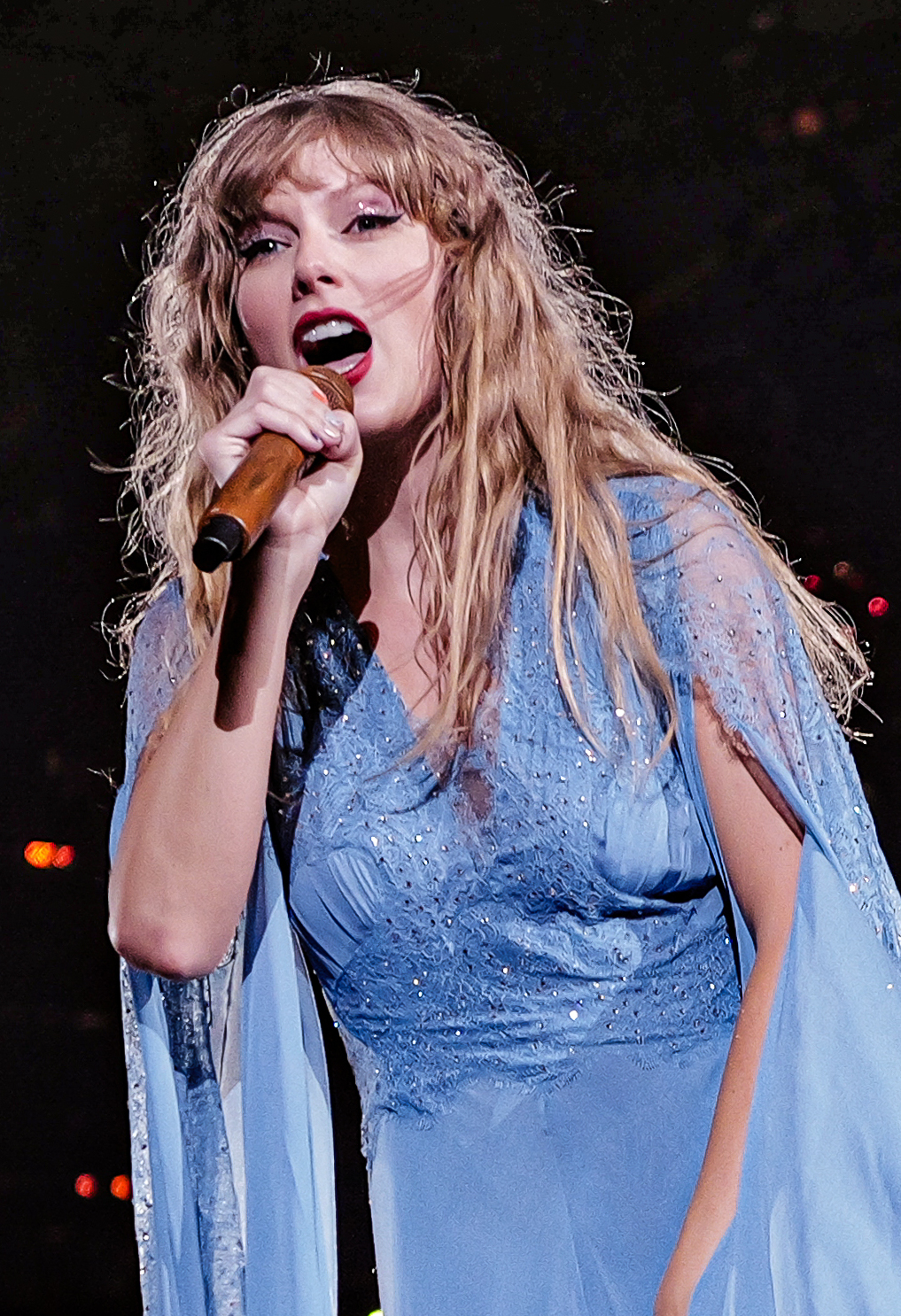
The Eras Tour by Taylor Swift is the highest-grossing tour among women of all time.

Women have embarked on the highest-grossing concert tours, as soloists or all-female groups. Many reported figures are taken from Billboard and Pollstar, two major publications that regularly provide the official figures of concerts' gross revenue worldwide. However, there are many incomplete data in the early reporting of both publications, especially for the pre-2000s tours, hence a few claims are based on other non-specialist sources. This list excludes tours headlined by mixed-gender groups (such as On with the Show by Fleetwood Mac) or co-headlined with other male artists (such as Grand National Tour by Kendrick Lamar and SZA).

Madonna and Tina Turner were pioneers for women in touring since the 1980s, becoming the only women with multiple top-ten tours until the 2000s. Madonna's Who's That Girl World Tour (1987) was the first world tour held primarily in stadiums by a woman, while Turner was the first female performer to pass $100 million in a single tour, with the Wildest Dreams Tour (1996–1997). Madonna continued the success into the 2010s, along with the next generation of women such as Pink, Taylor Swift, and Beyoncé, all of whom have multiple top-ten entries in the respective decade. With the Formation World Tour (2016), Beyoncé became the first woman to headline a tour with entirely stadium shows. She is also currently the only woman to appear twice in the top ten of the 2020s.

The Eras Tour (2023–2024) by Taylor Swift became the first tour to pass $1 billion and $2 billion. Madonna's Sticky & Sweet Tour (2008–2009) remained the highest-grossing tour by a woman for 15 years (2008–2023), longer than any other record-holder. Between 2012 and 2018, she also occupied the top-two highest-grossing tours by a woman, with the MDNA Tour as the runner-up. The only groups on this list are the Spice Girls in the pre-2000s and Blackpink in the 2020s, with the latter's Born Pink World Tour remaining the highest-grossing tour by a female group of all time. Other significant milestones include I Am Gloria World Tour by Hong Kong singer G.E.M. as the highest-grossing tour by an Asian woman, as well as Shakira's Las Mujeres Ya No Lloran World Tour as the highest-grossing tour by a Latin woman. Madonna has achieved the highest-grossing women's tour of the year seven times, more than any other artists.

== All-time ranking ==
Keys
†	Indicates an ongoing tour
*	Indicates a tour with dates split between two different calendar decades

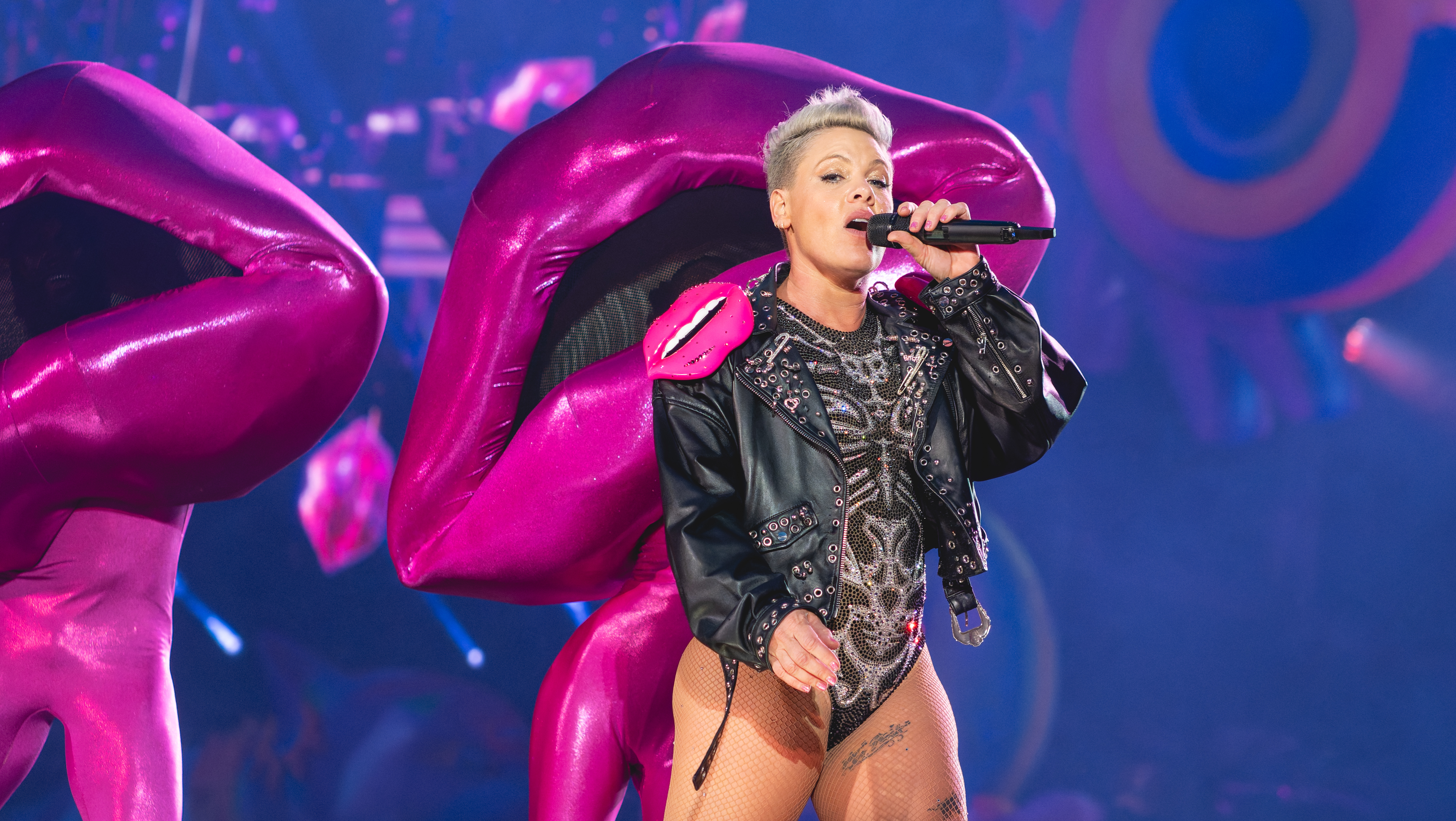
Pink on the Summer Carnival tour

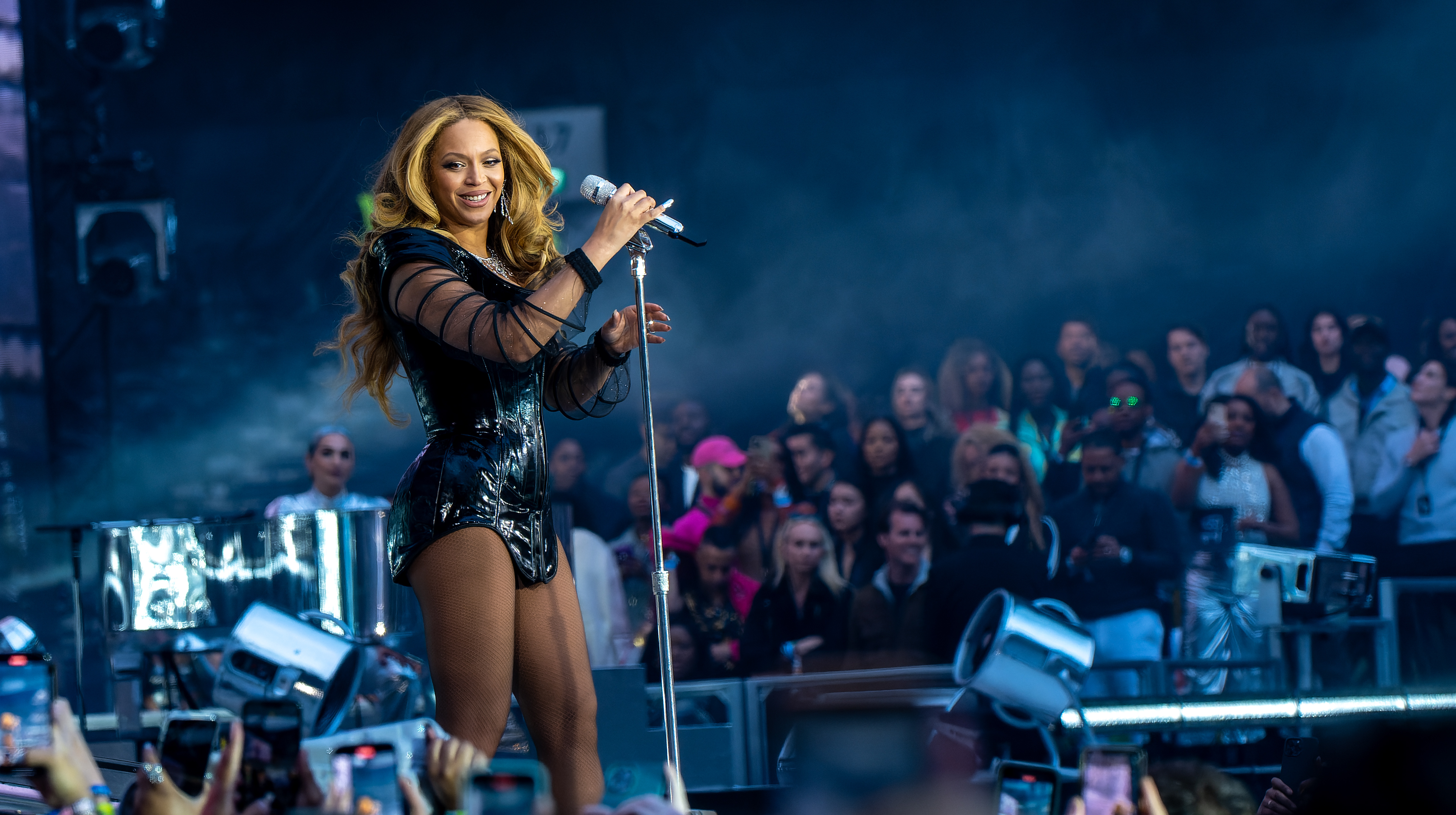
Beyoncé on the Renaissance World Tour

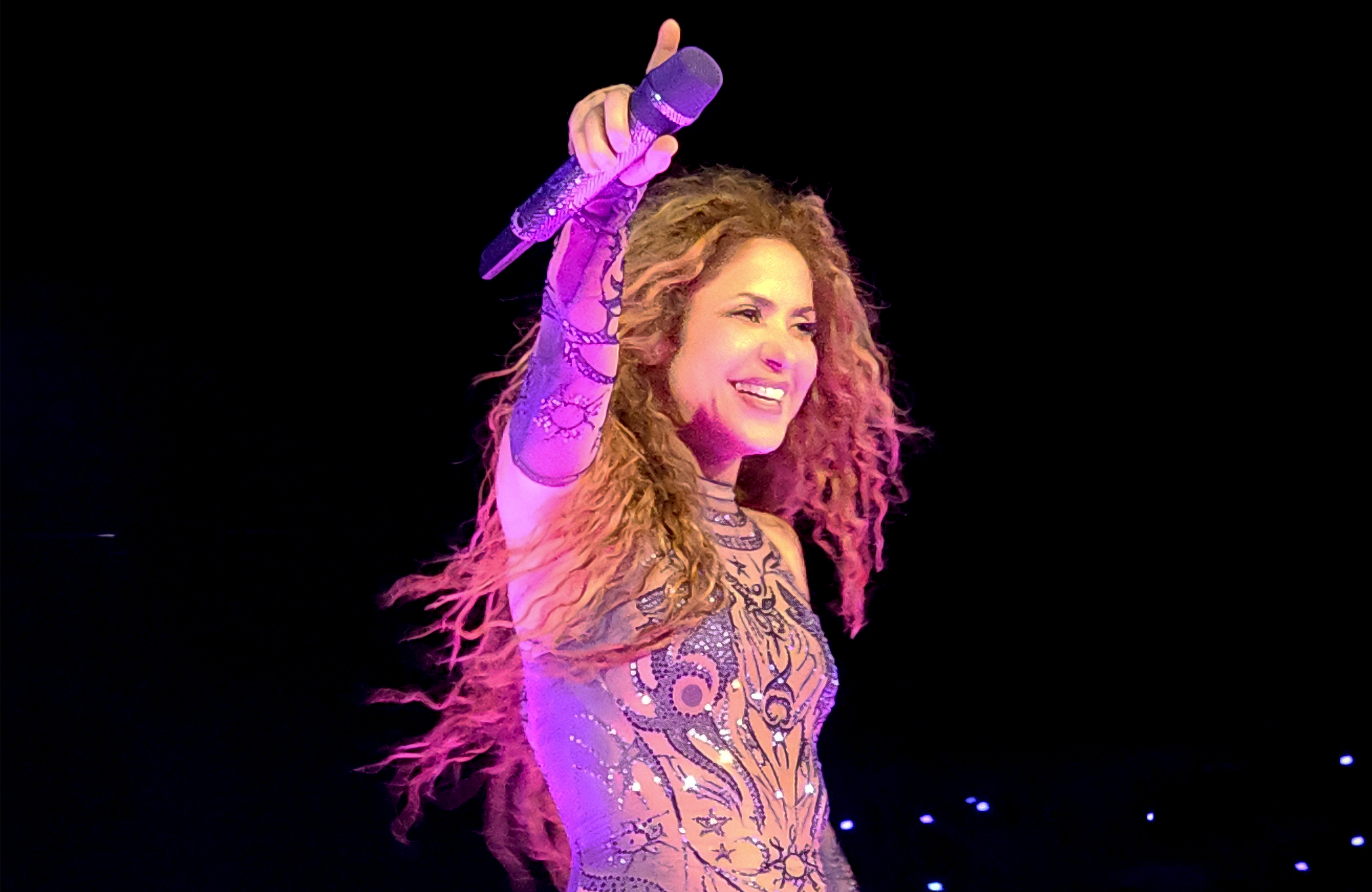
Shakira on the Las Mujeres Ya No Lloran World Tour

Top 20 highest-grossing tours by women of all time
Rank	Peak	Actual gross	Adjusted gross (in 2025 dollars)	Artist	Tour title	Year	Shows	Average gross	Ref.
1	1	$2,077,618,725	$2,132,275,503	Taylor Swift	The Eras Tour	2023–2024	149	$13,943,750	
2	2	$584,700,000	$600,081,945	Pink	Summer Carnival	2023–2024	97	$6,027,835	
3	2 (Note: Since Taylor Swift's Eras Tour was not reported to Billboard Boxscore, Beyoncé's Renaissance World Tour was reported as the highest-grossing tour by a woman at the time, although the latter factually never held the record. According to Forbes, the Eras Tour had already grossed $780 million by the end of August 2023.)	$579,800,000	$612,665,465	Beyoncé	Renaissance World Tour	2023	56	$10,353,571	
4	4	$565,500,000	$565,500,000	Shakira	Las Mujeres Ya No Lloran World Tour †	2025–2026	124	$4,560,484	
5	4	$424,000,000	$435,154,344	G.E.M.	I Am Gloria World Tour	2023–2026	182	$2,329,670	
6	1	$411,000,000	$616,786,878	Madonna	Sticky & Sweet Tour	2008–2009	85	$4,835,294	
7	6	$407,600,113	$418,323,018	Beyoncé	Cowboy Carter Tour	2025	32	$12,737,504	
8	2	$397,300,000	$500,309,449	Pink	Beautiful Trauma World Tour	2018–2019	156	$2,546,795	
9	9	$362,900,000	$362,900,000	Lady Gaga	The Mayhem Ball	2025–2026	86	$4,219,767	(Note: With the inclusion of early promotional concerts in Mexico City and Singapore, which were not billed under the Mayhem Ball, the total gross during Mayhem era was $419.5 million from 93 shows.)
10	2	$345,675,146	$443,202,629	Taylor Swift	Reputation Stadium Tour	2018	53	$6,522,173	
11	6	$330,000,000	$348,705,767	Blackpink	Born Pink World Tour	2022–2023	66	$5,000,000	
12	8	$313,300,000	$321,542,113	Karol G	Mañana Será Bonito Tour	2023–2024	66	$5,053,226	
13	2	$305,158,363	$427,947,117	Madonna	The MDNA Tour	2012	88	$3,467,709	
14	2	$280,000,000	$420,195,440	Celine Dion	Taking Chances World Tour	2008–2009	131	$2,137,405	(Note: Celine Dion's Taking Chances World Tour grossed $236.6 million in 2008 and $42.6 million in 2009.)
15	4	$256,084,556	$343,541,054	Beyoncé	The Formation World Tour	2016	49	$5,226,215	
16	4	$250,700,000	$340,519,795	Taylor Swift	The 1989 World Tour	2015	85	$2,949,412	
17	1	$250,000,000	$412,123,019	Cher	Living Proof: The Farewell Tour	2002–2005	325	$769,231	(Note: Cher's Living Proof: The Farewell Tour grossed $194,683,927 from 280 reported shows according to Billboard, bringing an average gross of $695,000 per show. Total gross for the tour's 325 dates is estimated between $200 million and $250 million.)
18	5	$229,100,000	$311,574,712	Beyoncé	The Mrs. Carter Show World Tour	2013–2014	133	$1,722,556	(Note: Beyoncé's Mrs. Carter Show World Tour tour grossed $188.6 million in 2013 and $40.5 million in 2014.)
19	4	$227,400,000	$324,885,355	Lady Gaga	The Monster Ball Tour	2009–2011	203	$1,118,227	
20	14	$227,247,141	$233,225,426	Madonna	The Celebration Tour	2023–2024	80	$2,840,589	

== Decade ranking ==
=== Pre-2000s ===
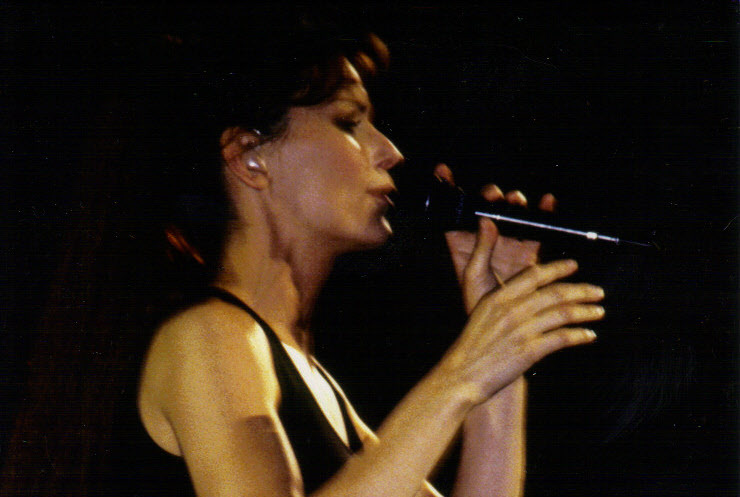
Shania Twain on the Come On Over Tour

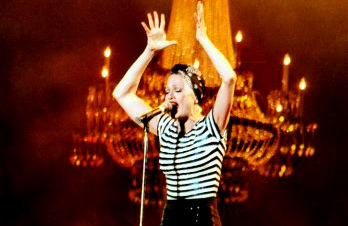
Madonna on the Girlie Show

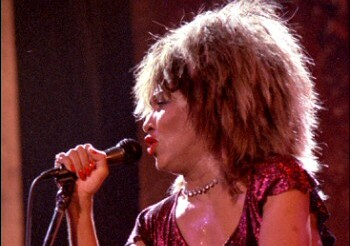
Tina Turner on the Private Dancer Tour

Top 10 highest-grossing tours by women of the pre-2000s
Rank	Actual gross	Adjusted gross (in 2025 dollars)	Artist	Tour title	Year	Shows	Average gross	Ref.
1	$133,000,000	$257,046,544	Celine Dion	Let's Talk About Love World Tour	1998–1999	97	$1,371,134	
2	$130,000,000	$260,727,612	Tina Turner	Wildest Dreams Tour	1996–1997	255	$509,804	
3	$86,000,000	$166,210,547	Shania Twain	Come On Over Tour	1998–1999	165	$521,212	
4	$70,000,000	$156,012,440	Madonna	The Girlie Show	1993	39	$1,794,872	
5	$62,700,000	$154,514,137	Madonna	Blond Ambition World Tour	1990	57	$1,100,000	
6	$60,000,000	$163,337,085	Tina Turner	Break Every Rule World Tour	1987–1988	220	$272,727	
7	$60,000,000	$118,517,762	Spice Girls	Spiceworld Tour	1998	40	$1,500,000	
8	$58,900,000	$127,942,860	Barbra Streisand	Barbra Streisand in Concert	1994	22	$2,677,273	
9	$40,000,000	$119,740,099	Tina Turner	Private Dancer Tour	1985	182	$219,780	
10	$37,700,000	$74,468,661	Cher	Do You Believe?	1999 *	57	$661,404	(Note: The figure for Cher's Do You Believe? does not include revenue from its 2000 leg.)

=== 2000s ===
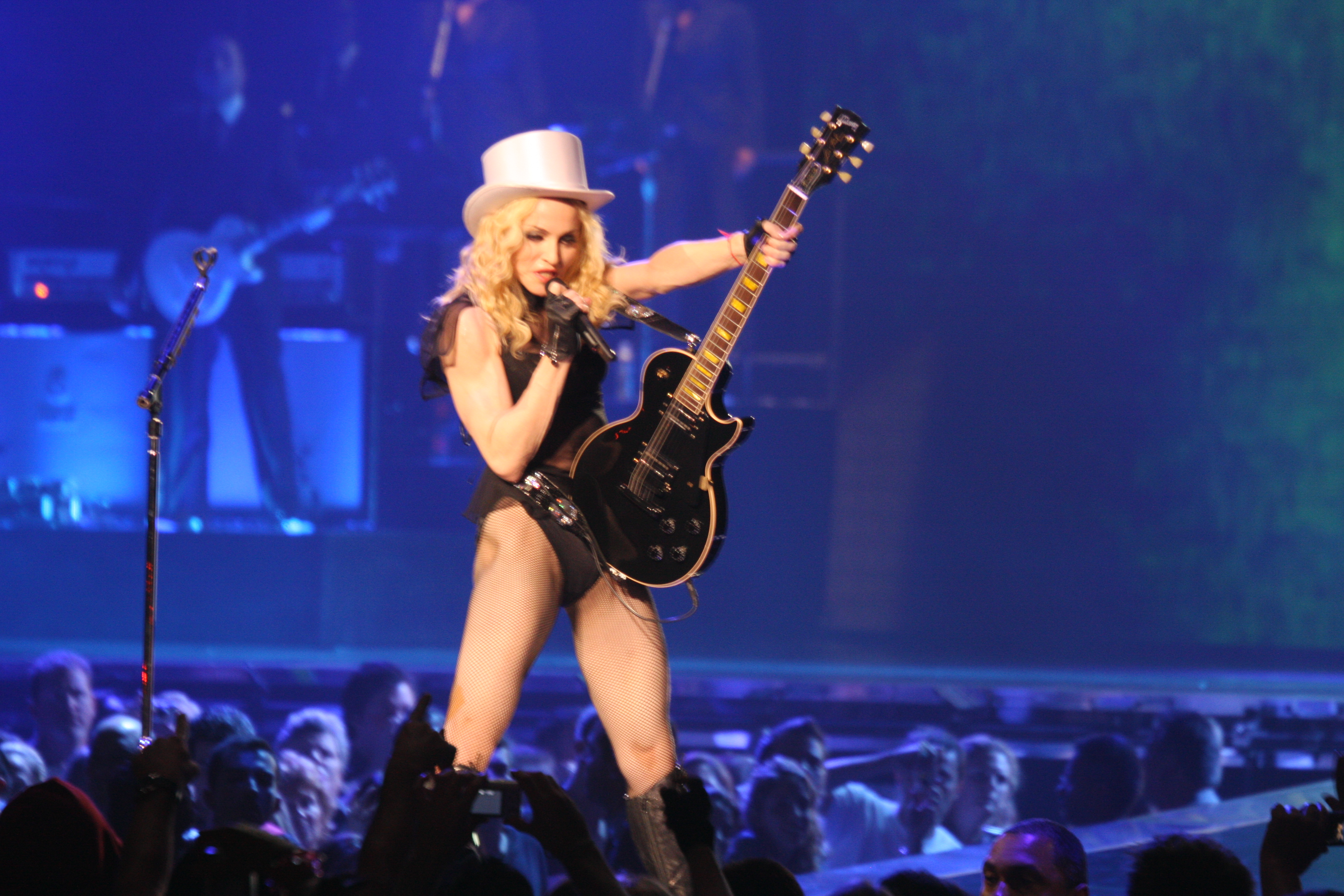
Madonna on the Sticky & Sweet Tour

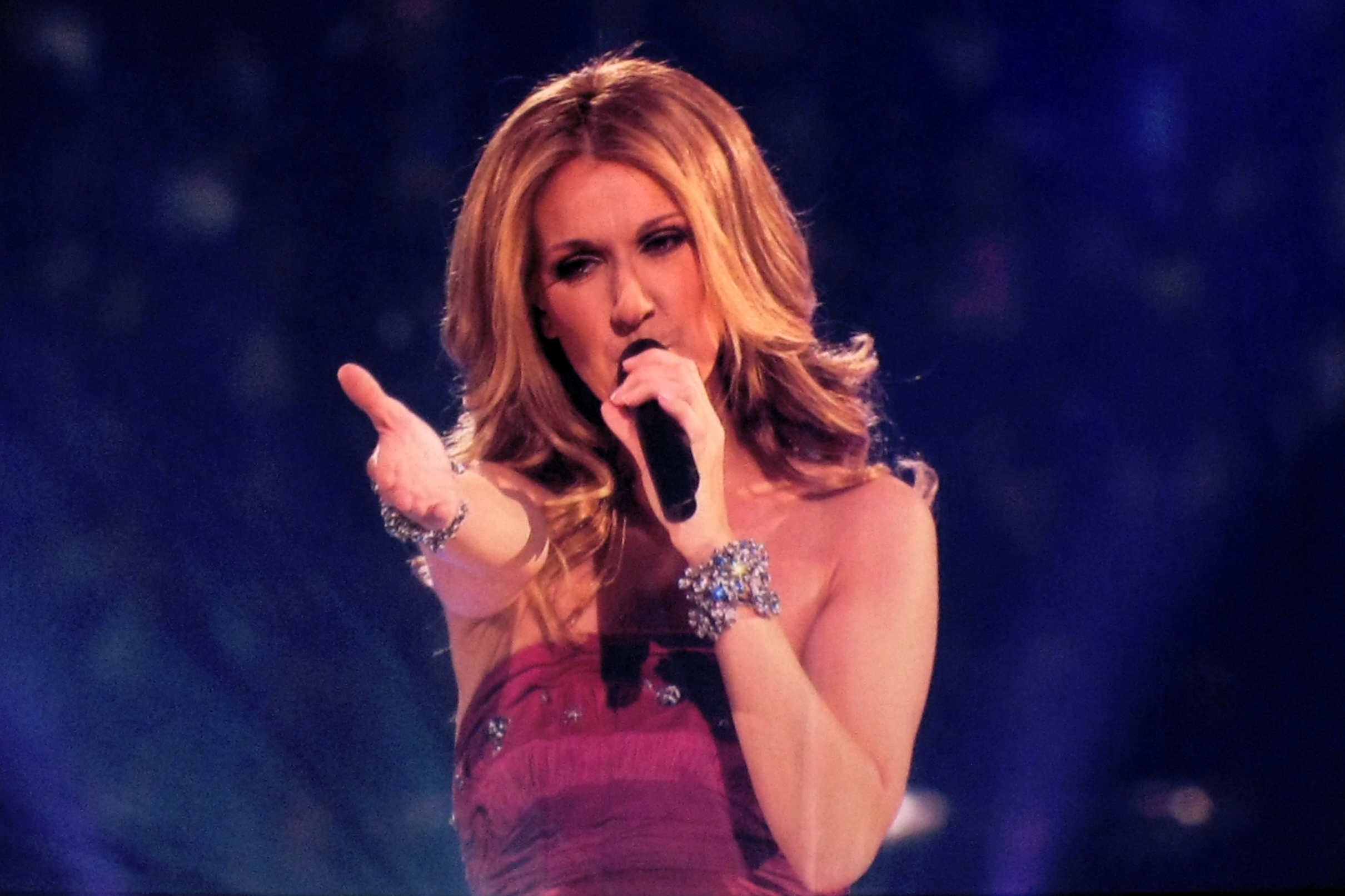
Celine Dion on the Taking Chances World Tour

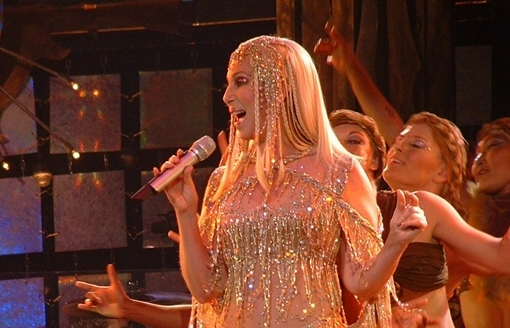
Cher on Living Proof: The Farewell Tour

Top 10 highest-grossing tours by women of the 2000s
Rank	Actual gross	Adjusted gross (in 2025 dollars)	Artist	Tour title	Year	Shows	Average gross	Ref.
1	$411,000,000	$616,786,878	Madonna	Sticky & Sweet Tour	2008–2009	85	$4,835,294	
2	$279,200,000	$417,194,044	Celine Dion	Taking Chances World Tour	2008–2009	129	$2,164,341	
3	$250,000,000	$412,123,019	Cher	Living Proof: The Farewell Tour	2002–2005	325	$769,231	
4	$194,754,447	$311,034,875	Madonna	Confessions Tour	2006	60	$3,245,907	
5	$132,500,000	$198,842,485	Tina Turner	Tina!: 50th Anniversary Tour	2008–2009	90	$1,472,222	
6	$131,800,000	$197,791,996	Britney Spears	The Circus Starring Britney Spears	2009	97	$1,358,763	
7	$125,000,000	$213,068,182	Madonna	Re-Invention World Tour	2004	56	$2,232,143	
8	$122,500,000	$229,021,739	Tina Turner	Twenty Four Seven Tour	2000	108	$1,134,259	
9	$119,500,000	$185,550,072	Barbra Streisand	Streisand	2006–2007	29	$4,120,690	
10	$103,500,000	$155,322,243	Pink	Funhouse Tour	2009 *	133	$778,195	(Note: The figure for Pink's Funhouse Tour does not include revenue from its 2010 leg.)

=== 2010s ===
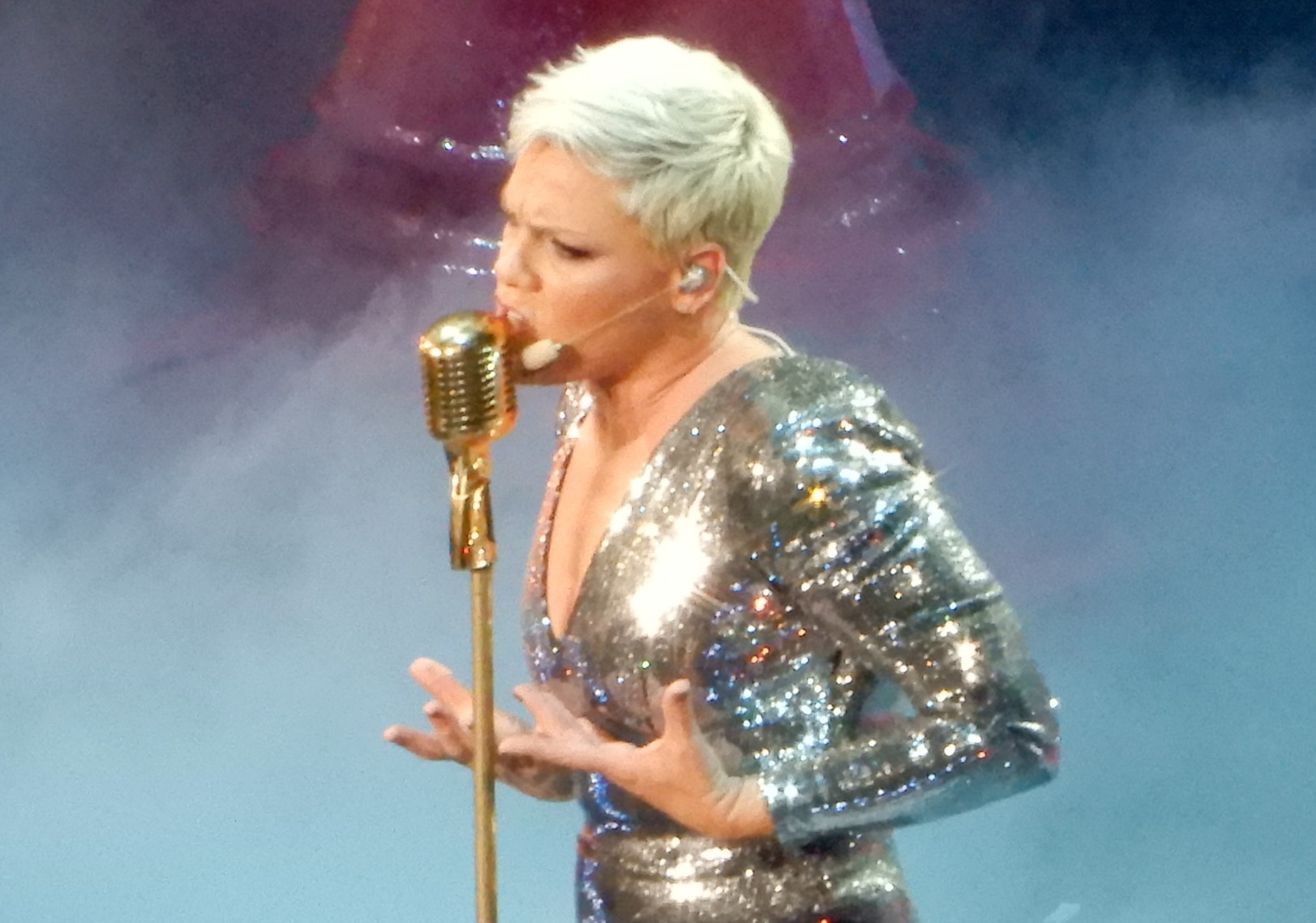
Pink on the Beautiful Trauma World Tour

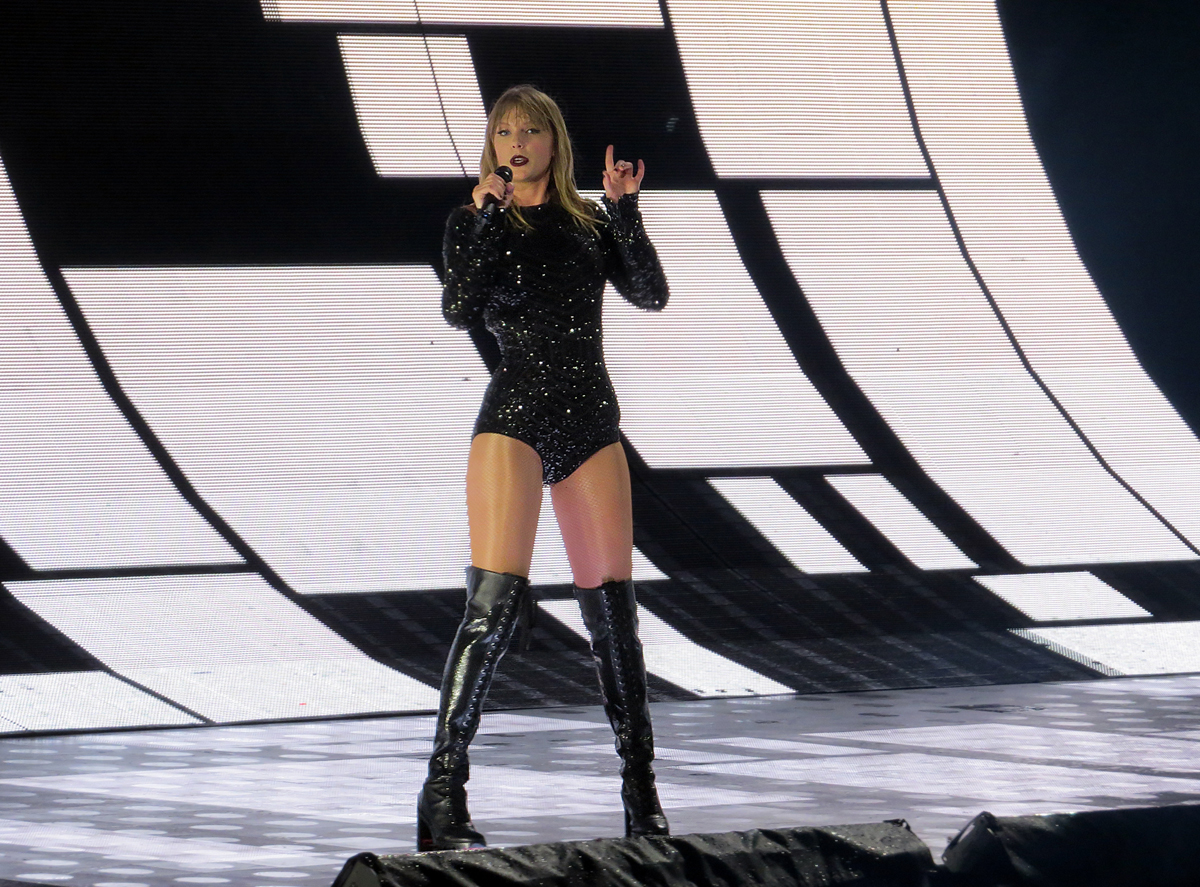
Taylor Swift on the Reputation Stadium Tour

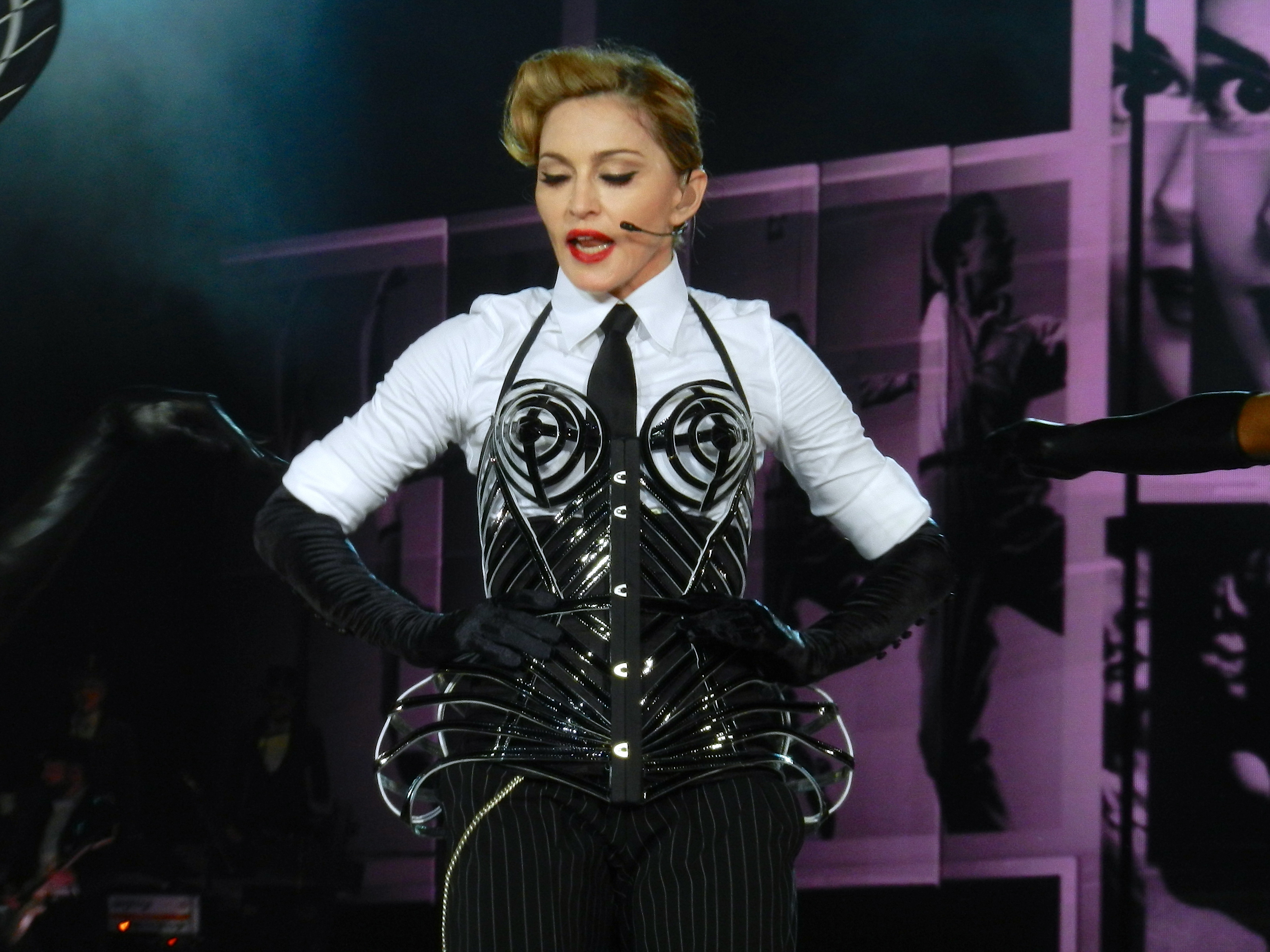
Madonna on the MDNA Tour

Top 10 highest-grossing tours by women of the 2010s
Rank	Actual gross	Adjusted gross (in 2025 dollars)	Artist	Tour title	Year	Shows	Average gross	Ref.
1	$397,300,000	$500,309,449	Pink	Beautiful Trauma World Tour	2018–2019	156	$2,546,795	
2	$345,675,146	$443,202,629	Taylor Swift	Reputation Stadium Tour	2018	53	$6,522,173	
3	$305,158,363	$427,947,117	Madonna	The MDNA Tour	2012	88	$3,467,709	
4	$256,084,556	$343,541,054	Beyoncé	The Formation World Tour	2016	49	$5,226,215	
5	$250,700,000	$340,519,795	Taylor Swift	The 1989 World Tour	2015	85	$2,949,412	
6	$229,100,000	$311,574,712	Beyoncé	The Mrs. Carter Show World Tour	2013–2014	133	$1,722,556	
7	$226,700,000	$297,763,033	Adele	Adele Live 2016–2017	2016–2017	118	$1,921,186	(Note: Adele's Live 2016–2017 tour grossed $167.7 million in 2016 and $59 million in 2017.)
8	$204,300,000	$277,495,788	Katy Perry	Prismatic World Tour	2014–2015	149	$1,371,141	(Note: Katy Perry's Prismatic World Tour tour grossed $153.3 million in 2014 and $51 million in 2015.)
9	$197,300,000	$282,378,328	Lady Gaga	The Monster Ball Tour	2010–2011 *	177	$1,114,689	(Note: Lady Gaga's Monster Ball Tour tour grossed $133.6 million in 2010 and $63.7 million in 2011. The gross from its 2009 leg is excluded for this ranking.)
10	$184,000,000	$250,238,965	Pink	The Truth About Love Tour	2013–2014	142	$1,295,775	

=== 2020s ===
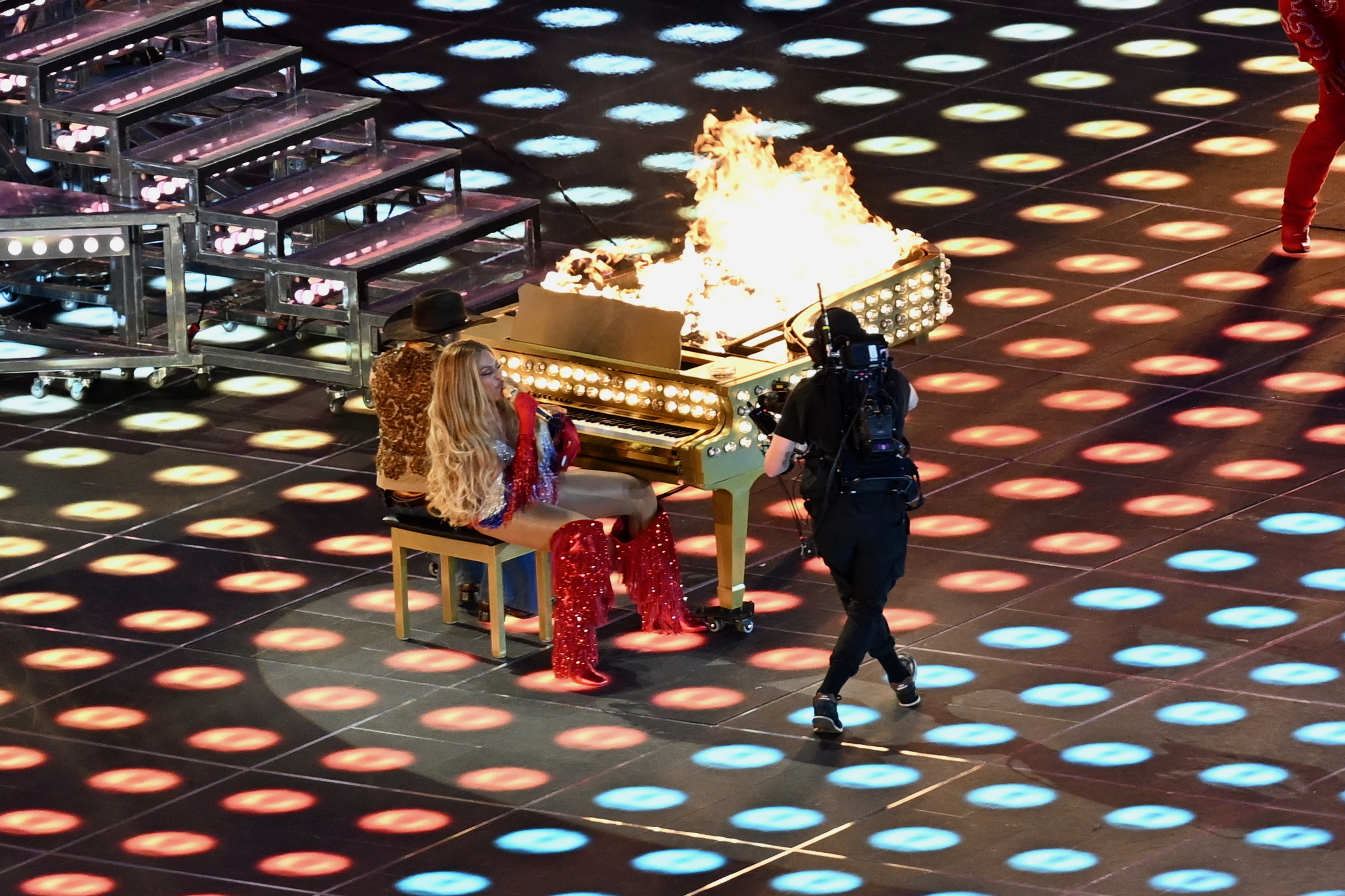
Beyoncé on the Cowboy Carter Tour

Lady Gaga on the Mayhem Ball

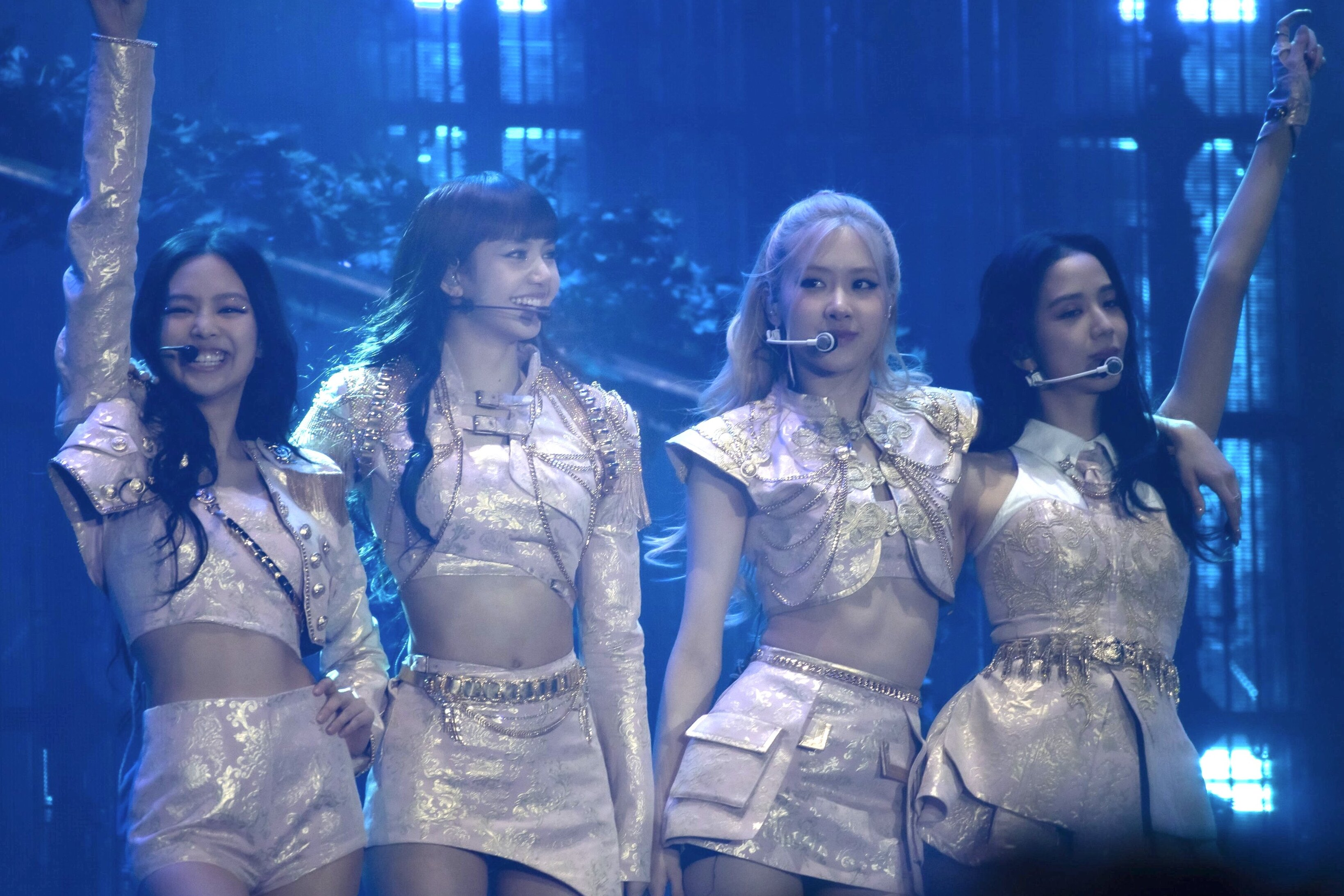
Blackpink on the Born Pink World Tour

Top 10 highest-grossing tours by women of the 2020s
Rank	Actual gross	Adjusted gross (in 2025 dollars)	Artist	Tour title	Year	Shows	Average gross	Ref.
1	$2,077,618,725	$2,132,275,503	Taylor Swift	The Eras Tour	2023–2024	149	$13,943,750	
2	$584,700,000	$600,081,945	Pink	Summer Carnival	2023–2024	97	$6,027,835	
3	$579,800,000	$612,665,465	Beyoncé	Renaissance World Tour	2023	56	$10,353,571	
4	$565,500,000	$565,500,000	Shakira	Las Mujeres Ya No Lloran World Tour †	2025–2026	124	$4,560,484	
5	$424,000,000	$435,154,344	G.E.M.	I Am Gloria World Tour	2023–2026	86	$4,930,233	
6	$407,600,113	$418,323,018	Beyoncé	Cowboy Carter Tour	2025	32	$12,737,504	
7	$362,900,000	$362,900,000	Lady Gaga	The Mayhem Ball	2025–2026	86	$4,219,767	
8	$330,000,000	$348,705,767	Blackpink	Born Pink World Tour	2022–2023	66	$5,000,000	
9	$313,300,000	$321,542,113	Karol G	Mañana Será Bonito Tour	2023–2024	62	$5,053,226	
10	$227,247,141	$233,225,426	Madonna	The Celebration Tour	2023–2024	80	$2,840,589	

== Annual ranking ==
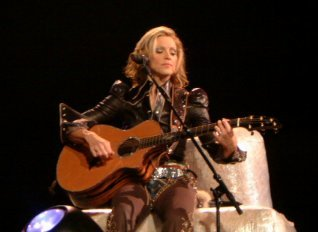
Madonna on the Drowned World Tour, one of her seven tours to top the annual ranking

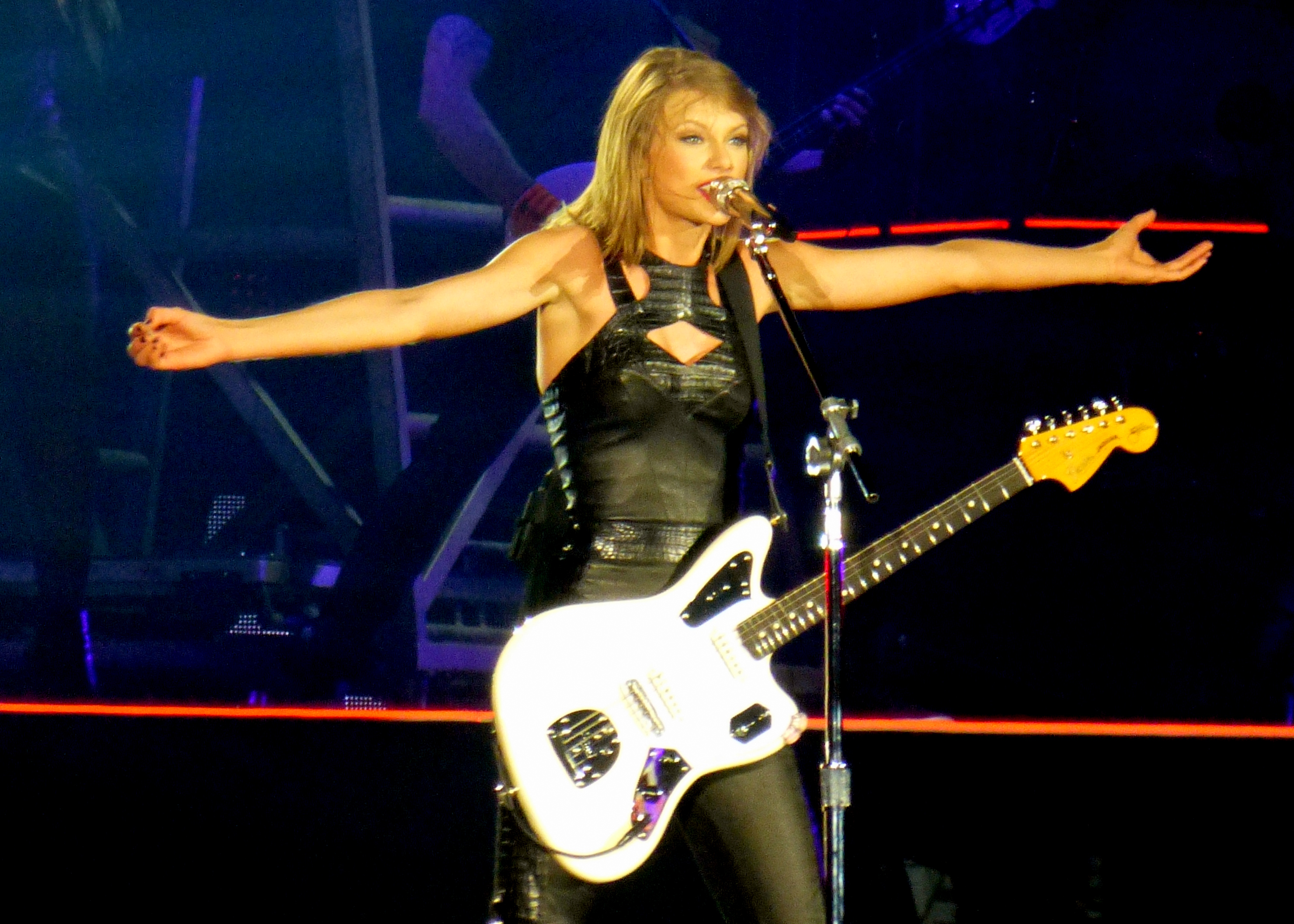
Taylor Swift on the 1989 World Tour, one of her five tours to top the annual ranking

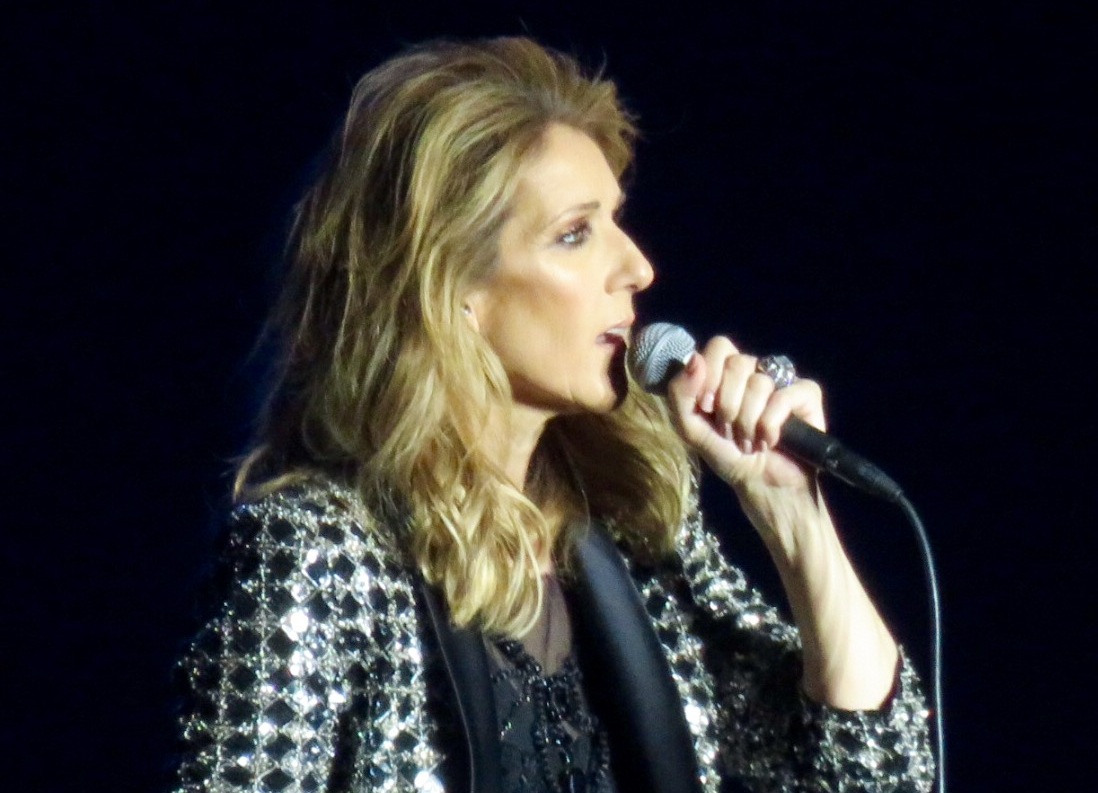
Celine Dion on the Live 2017, one of her three tours to top the annual ranking

Highest-grossing tours by women annually
Year	Actual gross	Adjusted gross (in 2025 dollars)	Artist	Tour title	Shows	Average gross	Ref.
1987	$20,100,000	$56,961,775	Whitney Houston	Moment of Truth World Tour	89	$225,843	
1990	$28,100,000 (Note: Other source estimated the gross of Madonna's Blond Ambition World Tour at $62.7 million in 1990. However, only 35 shows reported to Amusement Business, with a gross of $19,392,624.)	$69,247,962	Janet Jackson	Rhythm Nation World Tour	89	$315,730	
1993	$15,193,698	$33,862,941	Madonna	The Girlie Show	11	$1,381,245	(Note: Madonna's Girlie Show was the highest-grossing tour by a woman in 1993, with only 11 shows reported to Amusement Business. Other source estimated the total gross of the 39-date tour at $70 million.)
1994	$58,900,000	$127,942,860	Barbra Streisand	Barbra Streisand in Concert	22	$2,677,273	
1995	$27,400,000	$57,893,645	Reba McEntire	Starting Over Tour	101	$271,287	
1996	$26,100,000	$53,578,931	Reba McEntire	20th Anniversary Tour	86	$303,488	
1997	$24,800,000	$49,738,806	Tina Turner	Wildest Dreams Tour	70	$354,286	
1998	$38,100,000	$75,258,779	Celine Dion	Let's Talk About Love World Tour	43	$886,047	
1999	$40,800,000	$78,853,376	Shania Twain	Come On Over Tour	62	$658,065	
2000	$122,500,000	$229,021,739	Tina Turner	Twenty Four Seven Tour	108	$1,134,259	
2001	$74,000,000	$134,551,776	Madonna	Drowned World Tour	47	$1,574,468	
2002	$73,600,000	$131,744,681	Cher	Living Proof: The Farewell Tour	93	$791,398	
2003	$68,200,000 (Note: Celine Dion became the highest-grossing female artist of 2003 according to Pollstar, collecting $80.5 million from her residency A New Day...)	$119,362,337	Cher	Living Proof: The Farewell Tour	102	$747,739	
2004	$125,000,000	$213,068,182	Madonna	Re-Invention World Tour	56	$2,232,143	
2005	$27,237,641 (Note: Celine Dion became the highest-grossing female artist of 2005 according to Pollstar, collecting $81.3 million from her residency A New Day...)	$44,901,035	Cher	Living Proof: The Farewell Tour	40	$680,941	
2006	$194,754,447	$311,034,875	Madonna	Confessions Tour	60	$3,245,907	
2007	$48,173,773 (Note: Celine Dion became the highest-grossing female artist of 2007 according to Pollstar, collecting $65.3 million from her residency A New Day...)	$74,800,394	Christina Aguilera	Back to Basics Tour	63	$764,663	
2008	$281,600,000	$421,094,281	Madonna	Sticky & Sweet Tour	58	$4,855,172	
2009	$137,700,000	$206,646,114	Madonna	Sticky & Sweet Tour	27	$5,100,000	
2010	$133,600,000	$197,250,114	Lady Gaga	The Monster Ball Tour	138	$968,116	
2011	$104,200,000	$149,132,396	Taylor Swift	Speak Now World Tour	100	$1,042,000	
2012	$305,158,363	$427,947,117	Madonna	The MDNA Tour	88	$3,467,709	
2013	$188,600,000	$260,672,143	Beyoncé	The Mrs. Carter Show World Tour	108	$1,746,296	
2014	$153,300,000	$208,487,138	Katy Perry	Prismatic World Tour	106	$1,446,226	
2015	$250,700,000	$340,519,795	Taylor Swift	The 1989 World Tour	85	$2,949,412	
2016	$256,084,556	$343,541,054	Beyoncé	The Formation World Tour	49	$5,226,215	
2017	$101,200,000	$132,922,889	Celine Dion	Live 2017	90	$1,124,444	
2018	$345,100,000	$442,465,213	Taylor Swift	Reputation Stadium Tour	53	$6,511,321	
2019	$215,200,000	$270,995,705	Pink	Beautiful Trauma World Tour	68	$3,164,706	
2020	$71,200,000	$88,576,572	Celine Dion	Courage World Tour	33	$2,157,576	
2021	$29,400,000	$34,931,229	Alanis Morissette	2021 World Tour	34	$864,706	
2022	$112,394,525	$123,654,427	Lady Gaga	The Chromatica Ball	20	$5,619,726	(Note: Lady Gaga became the top female artist on the year-end Billboard Boxscore chart, with $125.3 million, which included the gross of her Jazz & Piano residency. The gross of the Chromatica Ball is $112 million.)
2023	$1,039,263,762	$1,098,173,536	Taylor Swift	The Eras Tour	60	$17,321,063	
2024	$1,043,421,552	$1,070,871,276	Taylor Swift	The Eras Tour	80	$13,042,769	
2025	$407,600,113	$418,323,018	Beyoncé	Cowboy Carter Tour	32	$12,737,504	

== See also ==
- List of highest-grossing concert tours
- List of highest-grossing concert series at a single venue
