= Sueños (music festival) =

Music festival in Chicago

- Genre: Reggaeton, Latin
- Dates: May
- Location: Chicago
- Years active: 2022–present
- Attendance: 80,000 (2022)
- Website: www.suenosmusicfestival.com

Sueños is an annual American music festival held in Chicago since 2022 showcasing reggaeton and latin trap.

== History ==
Sueños was started in 2022 by the producers of the Baja Beach Fest in collaboration with C3 Presents, the production team of Lollapalooza, and Reventon, a local entertainment company.

It was a two-day event with headline artists including J Balvin, Ozuna and Wisin Y Yandel. Other performances were by Myke Towers, El Alfa, Tokischa, Sech, Natanael Cano, Fuerza Regida, Jhay Cortez, Blessd, Jowell & Randy, DJ Miriam and DJ Luian.

Sueños originally hosted 80,000 people at Grant Park in Chicago in May 2022. The organizers also partnered with Kennedy-King College to set up a music industry career fair. The 2022 festival brought $120.9 million to the local economy and the festival donated $50,000 to the Pilsen Neighbors Community Council for the Fiesta Del Sol scholarships.

In 2023, the second edition of the festival featured headline artists including Wisin y Yandel, Feid, Grupo Firme, and Nicky Jam, along with performances by Arcangel, Chencho Corleone, Ivy Queen, PaoPao, Yovngchimi and Gera MX.

Its third iteration was scheduled for 25–26 May 2024 in Grant Park. Sueños attendees in Grant Park were evacuated on 26 May 2024 due to severe weather.

Year 5 of Sueños was held May 23-24, 2026. Headliners included J Balvin, kali Uchis, Fuerza Regida, and Los Tucanes de Tijuana.
