= Addicted to You (Shakira song) =

Single by Shakira

from the album Sale el Sol
- Released: 13 March 2012
- Genre: Merengue; rock; Latin pop
- Length: 2:27
- Label: Epic; Sony Music Latin
- Songwriters: Shakira; Edward Pou; Luis Fernando Ochoa; John Hill
- Producer: Shakira

Shakira singles chronology
"Je l'aime à mourir" (2011)	"Addicted to You" (2012)	"Get It Started" (2012)

Music video
- "Addicted to You" on YouTube

"Addicted to You" is a song recorded by Colombian singer-songwriter Shakira for her ninth studio album Sale el Sol (2010). The song was released as the fifth and final single from the album by Epic Records, on 13 March 2012. "Addicted to You" was written by Shakira, El Cata, John Hill and Luis Fernando Ochoa, and is a merengue-influenced song on the album. Lyrically, the song describes Shakira's infatuation for a lover. Despite having an English title, the majority of the song is sung in Spanish.

Upon its release, critics were generally favourable towards "Addicted to You", and praised its uptempo beats. The song reached number one on the Monitor Latino chart in Mexico, where it was later certified platinum by the Mexican Association of Phonograph Producers (AMPROFON). It also performed well on the charts of countries Poland, Spain, and France. In the United States, the single performed well on the Latin record charts, peaking at number nine on the Billboard Hot Latin Songs chart and at number three on both the Latin Pop Airplay and Tropical Songs chart.

An accompanying music video for "Addicted to You" was directed by Anthony Mandler, and features Shakira singing the song in various locations while sporting different outfits. Many critics praised the video's overall appeal and Shakira's appearance. The video reached over 100 million views on video-sharing website YouTube, and received a "Vevo Certified" by joint venture music video website Vevo for the achievement.

== Background and composition ==
"Addicted to You"
A 13-second sample of "Addicted to You". The uptempo song is highly influenced by merengue and reggaeton music.

"Addicted to You" was written by Dominican rapper and record producer Edward Bello, American record producer John Hill, Luis Fernando Ochoa and Shakira, for the singer's ninth studio album Sale el Sol. The album marked the first time she worked with Bello, who is better known by his stage name El Cata, and their collaboration started after Shakira expressed her desire to experiment with merengue music, saying "I grew up listening to merengue— that was a big part of my life, and I was missing it". Merengue is a type of music and dance originating in the Dominican Republic, and after being referred to Bello by American rapper Pitbull, Shakira travelled to the country and began recording sessions with him in his "tiny" studio in Santo Domingo. Bello talked about his collaboration with Shakira, saying "If I was thinking that this little studio was going to be in the world's vision at this time, I wouldn't believe it". On 14 March 2012, Shakira's official website announced that "Addicted to You" would be the fifth and final single to be released from Sale el Sol. It was made available for digital download on Amazon.com and ITunes by Epic Records a day earlier.

According to Shakira, Sale el Sol has three "directions", one of which is the "Latino, tropical side" of the album. "Addicted to You", along with other tracks "Loca and "Rabiosa", is a primary example of this musical direction. In addition to merengue, "Addicted to You" is influenced by reggaeton music and features "a very 70's chorus and Copacabana sounds". Despite having an English title, the words "Addicted to You" are only sung in the chorus, and the rest of the song is sung entirely in Spanish. Lyrically, it details Shakira's infatuation with a lover.

== Reception ==
Critical reception towards "Addicted to You" was mostly positive. Jennifer Schaffer from The Stanford Daily commented that the song prevents the listener from getting "lulled" and "hurries back to the hip-swaying dance beat". Michelle Morgante from The Boston Globe picked the song as an example of Shakira's "new merengue-rock hybrid that lays down bare horn riffs over a driving beat in a groove that is irresistible". Carlos Macias from Terra USA, however, gave it a negative review and criticized its use of a "cheap keyboard that drives the tune reminds us of music played at weddings and quinceañeras". In 2013, Latina included "Addicted to You" on their list of "The 13 Best Songs in Spanglish" and commented that "If non-Spanish speakers can’t pick up the language after listening to this track, then we feel bad for you, son". At the 28th International Dance Music Awards held in 2013, "Addicted to You" was nominated for "Best Latin Dance Track". It was also nominated at the 2013 Billboard Latin Music Awards for Latin Pop Song of the Year. El Cata received an ASCAP Latin award at the Pop category for his composition of the song.

Commercially, "Addicted to You" was a particular success in Mexico. It peaked at number one on the Monitor Latino chart in the region, and was later certified platinum by the Mexican Association of Phonograph Producers (AMPROFON) for shipments of 60,000 units. Elsewhere, the song reached number one on the Polish Airplay chart. In France and Spain, the song peaked at numbers 15 and 14, respectively. "Addicted to You" also performed well on the Latin record charts in the United States. It peaked at number nine on the US Billboard Hot Latin Songs chart and stayed on the chart for a total 20 weeks. It peaked at number three on both the Latin Pop Airplay and Tropical Songs charts, staying on the charts for a total of 26 and 13 weeks, respectively. The song was acknowledged as an award-winning song at the 2011 BMI Latin Awards.

== Music video ==
Shakira wears various "high fashion" outfits in the video, such as a black and white polka dot blouse with a leather belt and high-cut black underwear (pictured).

The accompanying music video for "Addicted to You" was directed by Anthony Mandler in a one-day period in Valencia, California. The video premiered worldwide on 2 May 2012, and became a "trending topic" on online social networking and microblogging service Twitter following its release. The plot-less music video features Shakira singing the song in various locations while "writhing around" on a bed in candlelit room, dancing in front of "some foliage" in the streets of an "old Spanish style" town, and "splashing around in a bathtub".

Critical reception of the video was generally positive. Jenna Hally Rubenstein from MTV praised Shakira's appearance in the video, saying she looks "insanely en pointe" while "doing that ridic Shakira hip move nobody else can replicate ". Becky Bain from Idolator commented that the video is a "complete success" in case "the main draw of watching a Shakira video is to watch the Colombian singer swivel her honest hips around pretty backdrops while wearing revealing clothing". The video became immensely popular on video-sharing website YouTube, and was marked "Vevo Certified" by joint venture music video website Vevo for reaching more than 100 million views.

== Charts ==
=== Weekly charts ===
Chart (2012)	Peak position
Belgium (Ultratop 50 Flanders)	27
Belgium (Ultratop 50 Wallonia)	18
CIS Airplay (TopHit)	143
France (SNEP)	15
Honduras (Honduras Top 50)	8
Hungary (Editors' Choice Top 40)	37
Italy (FIMI)	49
Mexico (Monitor Latino)	1
Mexico (Mexico Airplay)	5
Poland Airplay (ZPAV)	1
Romania (Airplay 100)	7
Slovakia Airplay (ČNS IFPI)	43
Spain (Promusicae)	14
Switzerland (Schweizer Hitparade)	70
Ukraine Airplay (TopHit)	84
US Hot Latin Songs (Billboard)	9
US Latin Pop Airplay (Billboard)	3
US Tropical Airplay (Billboard)	3

=== Year-end charts ===
Chart (2012)	Position
Belgium (Wallonia)	97
France (SNEP)	80
Spain (PROMUSICAE)	48
US Latin Songs (Billboard)	28

== Certifications ==
Region	Certification	Certified units/sales
Brazil (Pro-Música Brasil)	Platinum	60,000^{‡}
Mexico (AMPROFON)	Diamond+2× Platinum+Gold	450,000^{‡}
Spain (Promusicae)	Gold	30,000^{‡}
^{‡} Sales+streaming figures based on certification alone.
