= Lo Que Más =

2010 song by Shakira

Song by Shakira

from the album Sale el Sol
- Released: 2010
- Genre: Latin pop, ballad
- Length: 2:29
- Label: Epic, Sony Music Latin
- Songwriters: Shakira; Albert Menéndez
- Producers: Shakira; Albert Menéndez

"Lo Que Más" (English: "What the Most") is a song by Colombian singer-songwriter Shakira on her ninth studio album Sale el Sol. The song is written and produced by Shakira and Albert Menéndez.

== Background and composition ==
"Lo Que Más" is a piano and cello ballad with a sorrowful melody. In the lyrics, Shakira bids farewell to her ex Antonio de la Rúa, and reflects a once-perfect relationship that has now grown weary, devoid of any chance for revival.

The song is the last song Shakira dedicated to her ex de la Rúa, with whom she was in a relationship from 2000 to 2010, and who began to distance himself from her in the last stages of their relationship. Other songs she has dedicated to him include the singles "Suerte", "Día de Enero", and "No".

"Lo Que Más" is featured on Shakira's ninth studio album Sale el Sol. Shakira commented on the sad songs of the album as following: "We all go through hard moments", "Whatever happened, it's right there in the songs", "I've decided that I'm not going to explain every song this time. It's hard to explain a song. These songs explain me better than I can explain them."

== Reception ==
Billboard outlined how "Lo Que Más" is "sung over solo piano and strings, a reminder of Shakira's versatility". El Comercio reflected how the song manages to catch attention and described how "you can hear fragments that make a clear allusion to an imminent breakup". Elena Benavente from El Mundo Shakira's "most personal song", and encapsulated it as "devastating". Carolina Martinez from Los 40 characterized the song as a "ballad with a very different rhythm to those we are now accustomed to", called the "verses of heartbreak and pain" beautiful, and compared the song to Shakira's 2022 single "Monotonía". Alexis Cook from Bolavip noted how the song has "a very nostalgic rhythm and lyrics" and melody, and inscribed how the lyrics "talk about how the relationship was wearing out". Radio Mitre described how "alarms rang because of the crisis with the Argentine" when Shakira released the song. Ryan Book from University Wire wrote that it is "a piano ballad that Shakira pours herself into, and the passion goes a long way". Jon Pareles from The New York Times reflected how the songs "Lo Que Más", "Antes de las Seis" and "Devoción" from Sale el Sol "churn with longing, regrets and loneliness". Carlos Macias from Terra USA inscribed how in the song "piano and cello flow perfectly right over Shakira's controlled voice". Jennifer Schaffer from The Stanford Daily portrayed the song as a tender, "sad ballad that steps into the realm of the melodramatic". Cairo 360 delineated how the song "has Shakira flexing her vocals and belting out a satisfactorily melancholy ballad, while orchestral strains, piano keys and strings fill the song with notes of longing".

== Weekly charts ==
Weekly chart performance for "Lo Que Más"
Chart (2010)	Peak position
US Latin Digital Songs (Billboard)	28
