= Live from Paris (Shakira album) =

Live album / video by Shakira
- Released: 2 December 2011
- Recorded: 13–14 June 2011
- Venue: Palais Omnisports de Paris-Bercy (Paris, France)
- Length: 199:00 (DVD and Blu-ray Disc); 77:21 (CD)
- Language: Spanish; English; French; Arabic
- Label: Epic
- Director: Nick Wickham

Shakira chronology
Sale el Sol (2010)	Live from Paris (2011)	Shakira (2014)

Shakira video chronology
Oral Fixation Tour (2007)	Live from Paris (2011)	Shakira in Concert: El Dorado World Tour (2019)

Singles from Live from Paris
- 1. "Je L'Aime à Mourir" Released: 29 November 2011

Live from Paris (Spanish: En vivo desde París) is the fourth live album by Colombian singer-songwriter Shakira. It was filmed at the Palais Omnisports de Paris-Bercy concert hall in Paris, France, where Shakira performed on 13 and 14 June 2011, as part of the European leg of The Sun Comes Out World Tour. Live from Paris was released in a DVD and live audio CD format, a standard DVD format, and as a Blu-ray Disc edition. It was released in most countries on 2 December 2011, while in the United States it was released on 5 December. Prior to its release, Live from Paris was screened in various cinemas across the world and was also promoted through Shakira's official website, which posted numerous trailers and previews of the album. Shakira's rendition of French singer-songwriter Francis Cabrel's song "Je L'Aime à Mourir", which she specifically performed during the concert shows at Paris, was released as a single on 29 November 2011.

Upon its release, Live from Paris received generally favourable reviews from critics, who praised it as a showcase of Shakira's versatility. One reviewer, however, criticised the singer for putting less emphasis on vocals and more on the dance routines. Commercially, the album performed well on the charts of France and Mexico, where it was later certified platinum by the Syndicat National de l'Édition Phonographique (SNEP) and Asociación Mexicana de Productores de Fonogramas y Videogramas (AMPROFON), respectively. In the United States, En Vivo Desde Paris peaked at number two on the Billboard Top Latin Albums chart, and at number one on the Latin Pop Albums chart.

== Background and release ==
After the tickets of the European leg of The Sun Comes Out World Tour, which was launched to promote Shakira's eighth studio album She Wolf (2009) and ninth studio album Sale el Sol (2010), were sold-out, she extended the tour into 2011 and announced a show to be held at the Palais Omnisports de Paris-Bercy in Paris, France, on 14 June. Later, Shakira decided to add another date to the Paris show of the tour and chose 13 June to perform at the same venue. The performances held on these two dates were filmed for inclusion in a live album. It was made available in three formats: an exclusive edition which includes a DVD and live audio CD, a standard DVD edition, and a Blu-ray Disc edition. The formats included the full performances of 22 songs, along with behind-the-scenes documentary footage of the shows. The recording was also screened in select cinemas in countries like Belgium, Brazil, Holland, Italy, Mexico, Portugal and Spain, in Dolby Surround sound. Shakira's official website also posted various trailers of the DVD and previews of some performances, such as that of "Whenever, Wherever", for additional promotion. The live album, consisting of the DVD and live audio CD, was released as Live from Paris and En Vivo Desde París on 2 December 2011, in most countries worldwide. In the United States, it was released on 5 December 2011. It was released in DVD and Blu-ray disc formats the following day.

"Je L'Aime à Mourir", Shakira's rendition of the original song by French singer-songwriter Francis Cabrel, was specifically added to the setlist of the tour for the concerts held in Paris. A studio recording of Shakira's version of the song was released as a single on 29 November 2011. The song peaked at number one on the singles chart of the French-speaking Wallonia region of Belgium and France, where it was later certified gold by the Belgian Entertainment Association (BEA) and Syndicat National de l'Édition Phonographique (SNEP), respectively.

== Reception ==
=== Critical reaction ===
Professional ratings
Review scores
Source	Rating
About.com	4.5/5 stars
AllMusic	3/5 stars
Entertainment Weekly	C+

Live from Paris received generally favourable reviews from critics. Carlos Quintana from About.com gave the DVD a very positive review and praised the selection of songs, saying they were reflective of Shakira's "evolution as an artist", and also commended her talent and performance, writing, "Besides her sensual dancing, unique voice and great energy, you can tell from the images on the DVD she is a very professional artist who takes her job very seriously". He concluded by calling the audio CD of Live from Paris a "compilation [that] covers in a good way her musical spectrum" and the DVD "fantastic" due to "the high quality of the sound and the video"; he also commented that the live album "offers a good overview of Shakira's musical career". Stephen Thomas Erlewine from AllMusic complimented the energy of the audio CD and Shakira's versatility, commenting she "leans heavily on glitzy electro-dance crossovers but finds room for quieter moments, whether it's a stripped-down cover of Metallica's "Nothing Else Matters" or her own "Gypsy", keeping the momentum running throughout a lengthy set, then bringing down the house with "Waka Waka". He, however, found the video versions much more impressive, opining that they "give a greater indication of the size of the spectacle" and "emphasize Shakira's intense charisma". Adam Markovitz from Entertainment Weekly gave the live album a mixed review; he praised the visual show Shakira put up, but was critical of her vocals, saying "she writhes and dry-humps through her catalog like the world's highest-paid strip-aerobics instructor, showing off plenty of skin — but sadly, not much musicianship". He also felt that Shakira's performance was too sexual, commenting that she "sometimes comes off more stripper than superstar". The album was nominated "Best Live DVD" at the 2012 Premios Shock awards ceremony,

=== Commercial performance ===
On the chart date of 10 December 2011, Live from Paris entered the French Albums Chart at number 32, and later peaked at number eight for two weeks. It spent a total of 35 weeks on the chart. It became Shakira's first live album to chart in the country. In 2011, the Syndicat National de l'Édition Phonographique certified the DVD platinum for sales of 15,000 units, and in 2012, the live album was certified platinum for sales of 100,000 units. Live from Paris entered the Mexican Albums Chart at number 13 and peaked at number four. It was a commercial success in the region and was later certified platinum and gold by the Asociación Mexicana de Productores de Fonogramas y Videogramas (AMPROFON) for shipments of 90,000 units.

In the United States, En Vivo Desde Paris performed well on the Latin record charts. It peaked at number two on the US Billboard Top Latin Albums chart and stayed on the chart for a total of 17 weeks. It peaked at number one on the Latin Pop Albums chart, and stayed on the chart for a total of 16 weeks. It became Shakira's first live album to peak atop the chart since MTV Unplugged (2000).

== Track listing ==
- On the Spanish version of the album, the album title and bonus features are listed in Spanish. The titles of the songs stay the same in all of the releases.

DVD and Blu-Ray Disc
No.	Title	Length
1.	"Pienso en Ti"	2:35
2.	"Why Wait"	2:49
3.	"Te Dejo Madrid"	3:18
4.	"Si Te Vas"	4:17
5.	"Whenever, Wherever"	5:14
6.	"Inevitable"	3:35
7.	"Nothing Else Matters/Despedida"	4:46
8.	"Gypsy"	5:29
9.	"La Tortura"	3:41
10.	"Ciega, Sordomuda"	5:16
11.	"Underneath Your Clothes"	4:01
12.	"Gordita"	3:34
13.	"Sale el Sol"	3:23
14.	"Las de la Intuición"	2:55
15.	"Loca"	3:06
16.	"She Wolf"	4:18 Encore
17.	"Ojos Así"	4:30
18.	"Antes de las Seis"	2:56
19.	"Je L'Aime à Mourir"	3:50
20.	"Hips Don't Lie"	6:54
21.	"Waka Waka (This Time for Africa)"	4:45
22.	"Shaki in Rehearsals"
23.	"Shaki & Sanziana"
24.	"Shaki in Paris"
25.	"Shaki — The Donkey Race"
26.	"Shaki Golfing"

Audio CD
No.	Title	Length
1.	"Pienso en Ti"	2:35
2.	"Why Wait"	2:49
3.	"Te Dejo Madrid"	3:18
4.	"Whenever, Wherever"	5:14
5.	"Inevitable"	3:35
6.	"Nothing Else Matters/Despedida"	4:46
7.	"Gypsy"	5:29
8.	"La Tortura"	3:41
9.	"Ciega, Sordomuda"	5:16
10.	"Underneath Your Clothes"	4:01
11.	"Sale el Sol"	3:23
12.	"Las de la Intuición"	2:55
13.	"Loca"	3:06
14.	"She Wolf"	4:18
15.	"Ojos Así"	4:30
16.	"Antes de las Seis"	2:56 Encore
17.	"Je L'Aime à Mourir"	3:50
18.	"Hips Don't Lie"	6:54
19.	"Waka Waka (This Time for Africa)"	4:45

== Personnel ==
Credits adapted from AllMusic.

- Promoter – Live Nation
- Live Nation SVP of Touring – Jorge "Pepo" Ferradas
- Live Nation Tour Director – John Sanders
- Director – Nick Wickham
- Production supervisor – Jake Berry
- Tour accountant – Dan McGee
- Production co-ordinator – Ali Vatter
- Management – Nexus Management Group
- Road manager – Rome Reddick
- Head rigger – Russell Glen
- Rigger – Bjorn Melchert
- Head carpenter – Pat Boyd
- Show director – Felix Barrett
- Tour camera operations – Redo Jackson, Joe Walohan
- Cameras supervisor – Brett Turnbull
- Camera operations – Adam Gohil, Julian Harries, Matt Ingham, Alistair Miller, Lotte Ockeloen, Harriet Sheard, Niels Van Brakel, Tim Van Der Voort, Alan Wells, Nick Wheeler, Shaun Willis
- Projectionist – David Cruz
- Wardrobe supervisor – Louise Kennedy
- Choreographer – Maite Marcos
- Tour photographer – Xavi Menos
- Tour assistant – Brad Kline
- Music supervisor – Magnus Fiennes
- Musical production – Shakira, Tim Mitchell
- Show programmer – Freddy Pinero
- Audio crew chief – Simon Bauer
- Audio monitor technician – Chris King
- Audio technicians – William Fisher, Dustin Lewis
- Monitor engineer – Ed Dragoules
- Key follow spot operator – Linford Hudson
- Carpenters – Eric Duheaney, Brittany Kiefer
- Lighting directors – Fraser Elisha, Daniel O'Brien
- Lighting designer – Paul Normandale
- Lighting technicians – Martin Garnish, Kris Lundberg, Ben Rogerson, Chris Roper
- Lighting crew chief – Joe Gonzales
- Lighting programmer – John McGarrigle
- Spot lights technician – Fraser McFarlane
- Satge Manager – Shawn Saucier
- Floor manager – Roger Dempster
- Set designer – Es Devlin
- Tour security – Armando Vera
- Venue security – Joaquin Barcia
- Artist personal security – Antonio Merabak
- Production manager – Bill Leabody
- Advance production manager – Phay MacMahon
- Dressing Rooms – Brad Kline
- Front of House Engineer – Michael Keating
- Artist dresser – Louise Kennedy
- Wardrobe – Pam Lewis
- Makeup - Elaine Kennedy, Lorraine Milligan, Elizabeth Patey
- Hair stylists – Cynthia Alvarez, Luz Marina Gonzalez
- Musical director – Tim Mitchel
- Drums - Brendan Buckley
- Keys - Albert Menendez
- Guitar technician – Andy Corns, Sean "Stig" Tighe
- Guitar(s) - Tim Mitchell, Grecco Buratto
- Bass Guitar - Eric Holden
- Backing Vocals - Olgui Chirino
- Percussion - Thomas "Dyani" Akuru
- Violin Technician – Sean "Sting" Tighe
- Violin - Una Palliser
- Dancers – Dionne Renee, Yanet Fuentes
- Shakira's Assistant – Gabriela Diaz
- Video Blogs - Xavi Menos
- Video director – Michael Tinsley
- Video engineer – Michael Bischof
- Lead led technician – Phil Evans
- Additional TV Lighting - Phase 4
- VIP Sponsorship Co-ordinator – Elizabeth Curto
- DVD Technical Facilities - CINEVIDEOGROUP, The Netherlands
- Unit Manager – Bolke Burnaby Lautier
- CINEVIDEOGROUP Project Co-ordinator – Rogier Kalkhove

== Charts ==
=== Weekly charts ===
Chart (2011)	Peak position
Austria DVD Chart	6
Belgian Albums (Ultratop Flanders)	49
Belgian Albums (Ultratop Wallonia)	16
Dutch DVDs Chart	11
French Albums (SNEP)	8
French Music DVD Chart	2
Greek Albums Chart	48
Hungarian Music DVD Chart	11
Italian DVD Chart	3
Italian Albums (Musica e Dischi)	32
Mexican Albums (Top 100 Mexico)	4
Portuguese Albums (AFP)	25
Spanish Albums (Promusicae)	18
Swiss Albums (Schweizer Hitparade)	39
Swiss DVDs Chart	4
Taiwan Five Music Video Chart	9
UK Music Video Chart	29
US Top Latin Albums (Billboard)	2
US Latin Pop Albums (Billboard)	1

=== Year-end charts ===
Chart (2011)	Position
French Albums Chart	98
Mexican Albums Chart	41

Chart (2012)	Position
Belgian Albums Chart (Flanders)	74
Belgian DVD Chart (Wallonia)	20
French Albums Chart	57
Mexican Albums Chart	24
US Billboard Top Latin Albums	47
US Billboard Latin Pop Albums	17

== Certifications ==
Album

Region	Certification	Certified units/sales
Canada (2017)	—N/a	13,000
Colombia Physical sales	Platinum	
France (SNEP)	Platinum	100,000^{*}
Mexico (AMPROFON)	Platinum+Gold	90,000^{^}
^{*} Sales figures based on certification alone.^{^} Shipments figures based on certification alone.

DVD

Region	Certification	Certified units/sales
France (SNEP)	Platinum	15,000^{*}
Poland (ZPAV)	Gold	5,000^{*}
^{*} Sales figures based on certification alone.

== See also ==
- List of number-one Billboard Latin Pop Albums from the 2010s
