= Je l'aime à mourir =

1979 single by Francis Cabrel

Single by Francis Cabrel

from the album Les Chemins de traverse
- B-side: "Les chemins de traverse"
- Released: 1979
- Recorded: 1979
- Genre: Pop
- Length: 2:42
- Label: CBS
- Songwriter: Francis Cabrel
- Producer: Jean-Jacques Souplet

Francis Cabrel singles chronology
"Pas trop de peine" (1978)	"Je l'aime à mourir" (1979)	"Je rêve" (1979)

Music video
- "Je l'aime à mourir" on YouTube

"Je l'aime à mourir" (English: I Love Her to Death, French: [ʒə l‿ɛm a mu.ʁiʁ]) is a French-language song written by Francis Cabrel. It is taken from his second album Les Chemins de traverse released in 1979 that sold over 600,000 copies in France. The single "Je l'aime à mourir" became a hit single for Francis Cabrel in France, Quebec (Canada), Europe and internationally. Spanish singer Manzanita interpreted the song to Spanish flamenco audience making the hit song popular again for the second time. It is considered Cabrel's most definitive hit alongside "Je t'aimais, je t'aime, je t'aimerai".

== Track listing ==
The original single contained "Les chemins de traverse" on the B-side

1. "Je l'aime à mourir (2:42)
2. "Les chemins de traverse" (3:00)

The song also appears on a number of Cabrel's compilations like Cabrel 77–87 (1987), Cabrel public (1984) and others.

== Sales ==
In France the single sold 600,000 copies, making it to the top of the French Singles & Airplay Chart Reviews, staying at number one for five consecutive weeks (charts of 7, 14, 21 and 28 September and 6 October 1979). The single became the most sold Cabrel single ever.

== Spanish version: "La Quiero a Morir" ==
"La Quiero a Morir"

Single by Francis Cabrel
- B-side: "Los Caminos Que Cruzan"
- Released: 1980
- Recorded: 1980
- Genre: Pop
- Label: CBS
- Songwriters: Francis Cabrel (music); Luis Gómez-Escolar (lyrics in Spanish)

Music video
- "La Quiero a Morir" on YouTube

Based on the popularity of the song, Cabrel commissioned Luis Gómez-Escolar to translate the song. Cabrel recorded the Spanish-language version of the song called "La Quiero a Morir" that was released in 1980 with the B-side containing a Spanish translation of the French B-side release "Les chemins de traverse" as "Los Caminos Que Cruzan":

1. "La Quiero a Morir" (2:42)
2. "Los Caminos Que Cruzan" (3:00)

The song also appeared in Cabrel's 1990 Spanish-language album Algo más de amor.

== Versions ==
- In 1979, Cabrel made his first rerecording of the original song in French.
- In 1980, Cabrel released Spanish translation under the Spanish title "La quiero a morir" in his all-Spanish-language album Algo más de amor.
- In 1981, the Czech songwriter and guitar player Lenka Filipová recorded it as Zamilovaná in the same name LP along with another Francis Cabrel's song (Přestaň si hrát na trápení: Une star à sa façon). It became a hit in Czechoslovakia.
- In 1986, Sergio Vargas recorded the Spanish version in merengue for his debut studio album La Quiero a Morir. His version peaked at #22 on the Hot Latin Tracks chart. It was the first of three Cabrel's songs recorded by Vargas. Later he recorded "Si algún día la ves / Si tu la croises un jour" y "Todo aquello que escribí / "L'Encre de tes yeux".
- In 1990 the Canadian Roch Voisine released an English version named Until Death Do Us Part written by James Campbell on his album Double
- The Haitian-Canadian singer Marc-Antoine covered the song in French.
- In 1997, American band Dark Latin Groove (DLG) performed "La quiero a morir" in salsa for their second studio album Swing On which was produced by Sergio George with the lead vocals done by Huey Dunbar. Their version peaked at number six at the Hot Latin Tracks and became their third number-one single on the Billboard Tropical Songs chart. A music video for their cover was filmed. In 2008, the group re-recorded the song on their fourth studio album Renacer with the lead vocals done by Miss Yaya.
- In 1998, Puerto Rican-American singer Gisselle performed the song as "Lo Quiero a Morir" on the collaboration album Juntos (1998) with Sergio Vargas. Gisselle's cover peaked at #16 on the Tropical Songs chart.
- In 2007, Jonas Tomalty re-recorded Roch Voisine's English version on his album Promised Land
- In 2007, The granadino band El Puchero del Hortelano covered the song in their fourth album Harumaki.
- Other Spanish versions include: Manzanita (singer) in Flamenco, Sergio Dalma, Camilo Sesto, Muchachito bombo infierno and Raphael
- In 2008, Quentin Mosimann included it in his album Duel
- In 2008, Les Enfoirés included a multilingual version in the 17th album Les Secrets des Enfoirés recorded during seven concerts they performed at the Zénith in Strasbourg (23–28 January 2008), reaching platinum status. "Je l'aime à mourir" was performed as a medley with the following: Kad Merad (endormie version), Jean-Jacques Goldman, Michael Jones (jazz), Gérard Jugnot (Japanese version), Mimie Mathy (hard rock version), Patrick Fiori (opera version), Jean-Baptiste Maunier (rap version) and finally Francis Cabrel, Kad Merad, Pascal Obispo and Public (original version).
- In 2011, Jarabe De Palo covered the song with Alejandro Sanz on their 2011 album ¿Y Ahora Qué Hacemos?
- In 2012, Shakira covered this song in Paris, Bercy.
- In 2018, Pol Granch performed a bilingual cover in Spanish and French during the second live show of the third series of Factor X.
- In 2018, Shakira sang the French version of the song in her stops (Antwerp, Paris, Luxembourg, Zürich, Bordeaux, Montpellier and Montréal) on El Dorado World Tour.
- In 2020, Latin American boy band CNCO recorded a version of "La Quiero a Morir" for their cover album Déjà Vu

== Alliage version ==
"Je l'aime à mourir"

Single by Alliage

from the album Musics
- Released: 1998
- Recorded: 1998
- Genre: Pop
- Label: Polygram
- Songwriter: Francis Cabrel

Alliage singles chronology
"Cruel Summer" (1998)	"Je l'aime à mourir" (1998)	"My Heart Goes Boom" (1998)

Music video
- "Je l'aime à mourir" on YouTube

The French boy band Alliage recorded a cover of the song on their second album Musics. It proved popular on French radio reaching #1 in airplay charts in France. "Je l'aime à mourir" was the third and last single from the album after "Je sais" and "Cruel Summer" a bilingual take on the Ace of Base classic done by Alliage and Ace of Base.

=== Track listing ===
1. "Je l'aime à mourir" (Radio Version) (2:50)
2. "Je l'aime à mourir" (Unplugged Version) (2:50)

=== Charts ===
The Alliage version of "Je l'aime à mourir" had relative chart success peaking at #30 in France and #39 in Belgium's francophone chart.

Chart (1998)	Peak position
France (SNEP)	30
Belgium (Ultratop 50 Wallonia)	39

== Shakira version ==
"Je l'aime à mourir"

Single by Shakira

from the album Live from Paris
- Released: 29 November 2011
- Genre: Pop; French pop
- Length: 3:42 (studio version); 3:50 (live version); 3:45 (DVD live version)
- Label: Epic; Sony
- Songwriter: Francis Cabrel
- Producer: Shakira

Shakira singles chronology
"Antes de las Seis" (2011)	"Je l'aime à mourir" (2011)	"Addicted to You" (2012)

Live video
- "Je L'Aime à Mourir (Live From Paris)" on YouTube

"Je l'aime à mourir" is a bilingual Spanish and French cover version of the song by Colombian singer-songwriter Shakira. She performed the song during her concerts in French-speaking countries on the second European leg of her The Sun Comes Out World Tour, dating 2011. Two of these concerts, in Paris-Bercy, were filmed for the tour's official DVD and Blu-ray. Shortly before the DVD/Blu-ray's release, a studio-recorded version of the song leaked, and was later officially released as the second single from Live from Paris. It was very well received by critics and by all her fans. The song has over 5,000,000 views on different channels on YouTube as of June 2012. In early December, the song promoted a Google Plus campaign for Shakira.

=== Chart performance ===
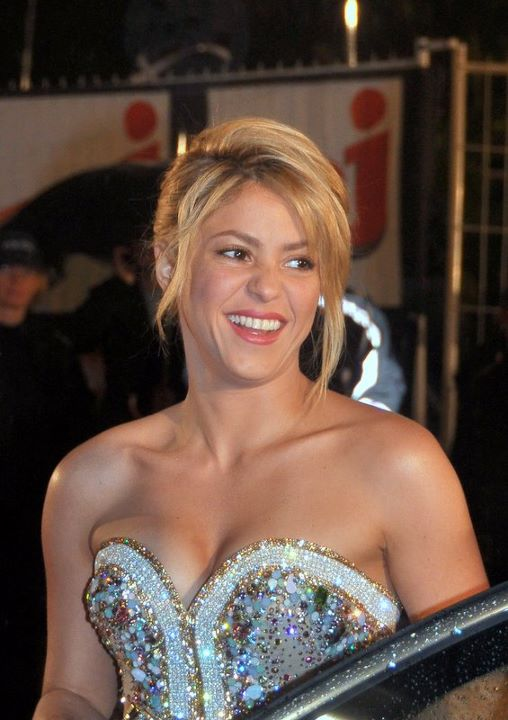
Shakira at the NRJ Music Awards 2012, where she made a performance similar to what she had done during the Latin Grammy in 2011.

The promotional single debuted at number fifty-six on the Billboard Canadian Hot 100 for the week-ending 17 December 2011, thus becoming one of Shakira's highest debuts on the chart. It also entered the French Airplay Top 200 where it received moderate airplay from Classic pop radio stations. In France, the song debuted at number one on the singles chart, selling 11,958 downloads, the song was number 1 in France for seven weeks.

=== Music video ===
An official video was released on 22 December 2011 on YouTube and VEVO, the cut is part of the DVD of the live album Live from Paris. The video was first available only in France and Switzerland, but in early 2012 the video was available worldwide.

=== Live performances ===
Shakira has performed the song live during The Sun Comes Out World Tour, El Dorado World Tour, and Las Mujeres Ya No Lloran Tour when in French-speaking countries. She also performed the song during the NRJ Music Award in France. This performance was similar to what she had done during the Latin Grammy in 2011; Shakira performed the song while playing an acoustic guitar version, mixing the original French lyrics with Spanish lyrics.

=== Formats and track listings ===
iTunes digital download
No.	Title	Writer(s)	Producer(s)	Length
1.	"Je l'aime à mourir" (Studio Version)	Francis Cabrel	Shakira	3:41

French CD-Single
No.	Title	Writer(s)	Producer(s)	Length
1.	"Je l'aime à mourir" (Studio Version)	Francis Cabrel	Shakira	3:41
2.	"Je l'aime à mourir" (Live Version)	Francis Cabrel	Shakira	3:50

=== Charts and sales ===
==== Charts ====
Chart (2011–12)	Peak position
Belgium (Ultratop 50 Flanders)	9
Belgium (Ultratop 50 Wallonia)	1
Canada Hot 100 (Billboard)	34
Czech Republic Airplay (ČNS IFPI)	96
France (SNEP)	1
Slovakia (IFPI)	16
Switzerland (Schweizer Hitparade)	18
Chart (2016)	Peak position
Spain (PROMUSICAE)	39

==== Year-end chart ====
Chart (2011)	Position
France	92
Chart (2012)	Position
Belgium (Flanders)	75
Belgium (Wallonia)	9
France	8

==== Certifications ====
Country	Provider	Certification
Belgium	Ultratop	Gold
France	SNEP	Gold
Switzerland	IFPI	Gold

=== Release history ===
Region	Date	Format	Label
Worldwide	29 November 2011	Digital download	Sony Music Entertainment
France	23 January 2012	CD single	Sony Music Entertainment

== See also ==
- List of French number-one hits of 1979
- List of Billboard Tropical Airplay number ones of 1997
- List of French number-one hits of 2011
- List of French number-one hits of 2012
- List of Ultratop 40 number-one singles of 2011
- List of Ultratop 40 number-one singles of 2012
