= Gordita (song) =

2010 song by Shakira

Song by Shakira featuring Calle 13

from the album Sale el Sol
- Released: 2010
- Studio: Circle House Studios (Miami, FL)
- Genre: Cumbia, Latin rap
- Length: 3:26
- Label: Epic, Sony Music Latin
- Songwriters: Shakira; Calle 13
- Producers: Diplo; John Hill; Shakira; Calle 13

"Gordita" (English: "Thick") is a song by Colombian singer-songwriter Shakira featuring Puerto Rican alternative hip-hop band Calle 13 on her ninth studio album Sale el Sol. A Latin rap and cumbia song, it reached number 10 on the Billboard Latin Digital Songs chart. It was produced by Diplo, John Hill, Shakira, and Calle 13.

== Background ==
"Gordita" is a Latin rap and cumbia song written and produced by Shakira and Residente's band Calle 13. The title of the song was initially speculated to be "Gordita Caliente" or "Mi Gordita", and the song was speculated to be released as the lead single of Sale el Sol due to the duo performing it before the album's release.

In 2011, Residente refIected how on the song he dared to tell Shakira he "liked her better when she was thick and had black hair". 2015, Calle 13 commented that collaborating with Shakira helped the band reach audiences their music would not otherwise have reached, and that they had good chemistry with her.

== Live performances ==
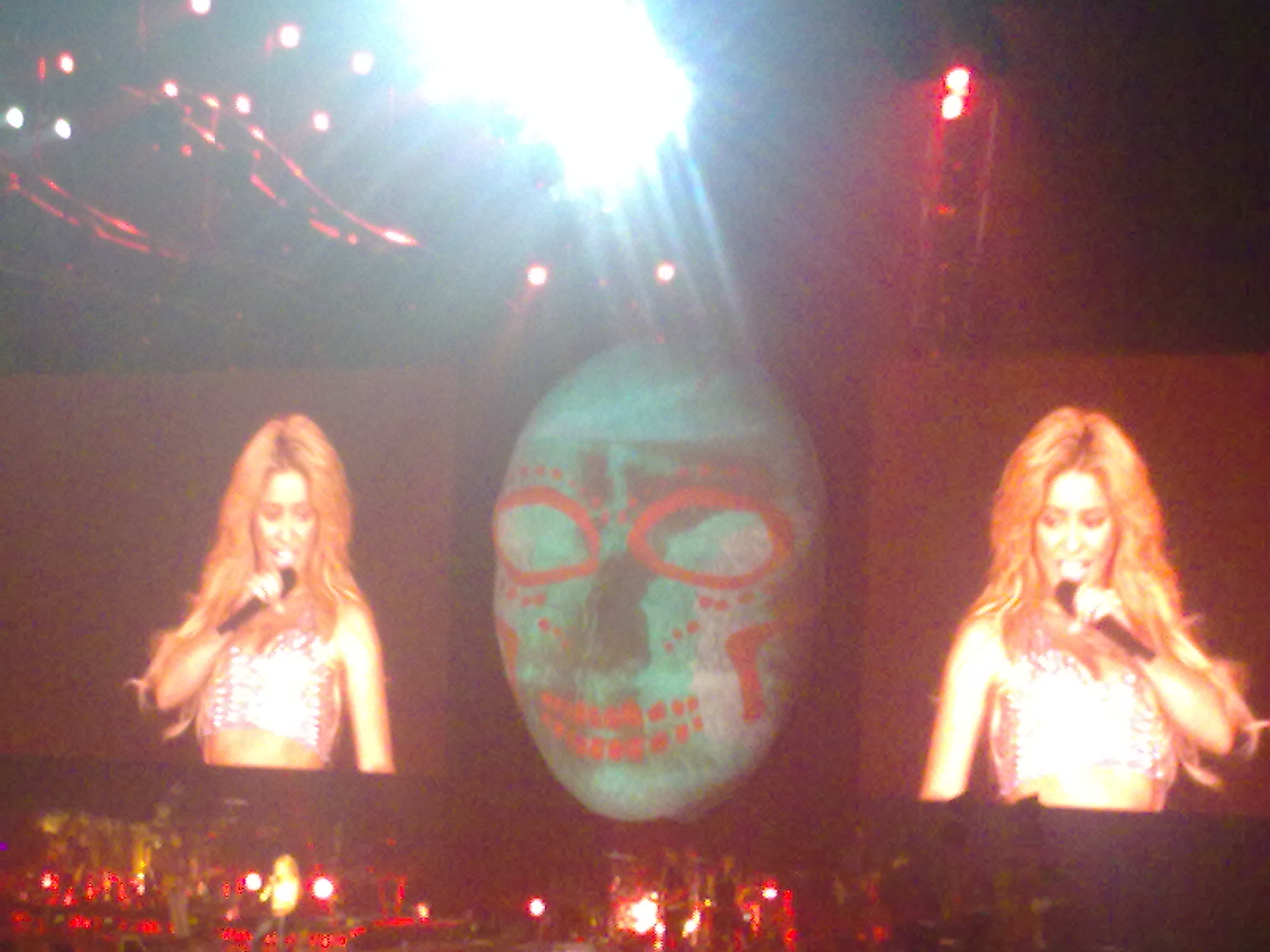
Shakira performing "Gordita" in her Manchester show: An animated face of Residente, the lead singer of Puerto Rican band Calle 13 was projected onto the screen during his portions of the song. Residente showed up in Shakira's shows in Los Angeles, Cordoba, and San Juan.

Shakira and Residente debuted the song by performing it before the release of Sale el Sol at Rock in Rio Lisboa IV, Rock in Rio Madrid III, and Glastonbury Festival in 2010. Shakira performed the song on her 2010-2011 The Sun Comes Out World Tour mostly solo, when a large, animated face representing that of Residente was projected onto the screen behind the stage during the performance. The face was used to cover Residente's portions of the song through prerecorded vocals. At the last date of the world tour in Hato Rey, San Juan, Puerto Rico, Shakira and Residente performed the song together, with him surprising her with a these words painted on his back: "Hoy Soy Tu Piqué" (English: "Today I'm Your Piqué"), referring to Shakira's then-boyfriend.

== Reception ==
"Gordita" was positively rated by critics, receiving praise for being catchy and lyrically bantering. Carlos Macias from Terra USA hailed the song as "the biggest hit from the album": "'Gordita' will be just as big as 'La Tortura'; just sit back and enjoy this gem", called Calle 13 "perfect on this song", and went on how "you'll want to get up and dance as soon as you listen to the track. The song is sexy and pegajosa and proves that Calle 13 is really one of the best groups out there. The collaboration is perfect and makes the whole CD worth your money." Opinión Bolivia characterized "Gordita" as "spicy, hot and confrontational" in which the artists "even take the opportunity to flirt". Michelle Morgante from Telemetro described the song as an "infectious, sexy collaboration" with "tropical influences" and called it one of the highlights of the album. Brian White from Why so blu? assessed the song as an eccentric "Latin-rap fusion collaboration project" that "will leave you wanting more", emphasizing that the song has an "infectious beat resonating in [his] head for days on end". Cairo 360 portrayed "Gordita" as an "upbeat rap ballad" "where Shakira shows more tongue-in-cheek humour than usual in her lyrics". Jon Pareles from The New York Times delineated the song's beat as a "Colombian cumbia with the drums pumped up". Jennifer Schaffer from The Stanford Daily took note on "Shakira's fierce grunts against an electronic underpinning".

== Weekly charts ==
Weekly chart performance for "Gordita"
Chart (2010–2011)	Peak position
Mexico Español Airplay (Billboard)	27
US Latin Digital Songs (Billboard)	10

== Certification ==
Region	Certification	Certified units/sales
Mexico (AMPROFON)	2× Platinum	120,000^{‡}
^{‡} Sales+streaming figures based on certification alone.
