= Sale el Sol =

2010 studio album by Shakira

Studio album by Shakira
- Released: 19 October 2010
- Recorded: 2008–2010
- Studios: La Marimonda (Nassau, Bahamas); El Granero (Punta del Este, Uruguay); Rodeo Recording; Electric Lady; Platinum Sound Recording; Quad (New York City, US); Serenity West Recording (Los Angeles, US); Sonic Projects; Circle House (Miami, US); Sarm; RAK Studios (London, England); Koryland; Aurha (Barcelona, Spain)
- Genres: Latin pop; merengue; rock; world
- Length: 46:04
- Languages: Spanish; English
- Label: Epic
- Producers: Shakira; Luis Fernando Ochoa; John Hill; El Cata; Josh Abraham; Lukas Burton; Lester Mendez; René Pérez

Shakira chronology
She Wolf (2009)	Sale el Sol (2010)	Live from Paris (2011)

Singles from Sale el Sol
- 1. "Loca" Released: 10 September 2010; 2. "Sale el Sol" Released: 4 January 2011; 3. "Rabiosa" Released: 8 April 2011; 4. "Antes de las Seis" Released: 21 October 2011; 5. "Addicted to You" Released: 13 March 2012

Sale el Sol (English: The Sun Comes Out, Spanish: [ˌsa.le el ˈsol]) is the ninth studio album by Colombian singer-songwriter Shakira, released on 19 October 2010, by Epic Records. The album marks a return to Shakira's signature Latin pop sound after the electropop record She Wolf (2009). The singer split the album into three musical "directions": a romantic side, a "rock and roll" side, and a "Latino, tropical" side. The latter two "directions" experiment with rock and merengue music, respectively. As co-producer, Shakira enlisted collaborators including Josh Abraham, El Cata, Gustavo Cerati, John Hill, Lester Mendez, Pitbull, and Residente from Calle 13.

Five singles were released from Sale el Sol. The lead single "Loca" peaked atop the record charts of Italy, Spain, and Switzerland and the Billboard Hot Latin Songs chart in the United States. The third single, "Rabiosa," reached top ten positions in Austria, Belgium, Italy and Spain. The other singles achieved moderate chart success in Hispanic regions. Shakira embarked on The Sun Comes Out World Tour in late-2010 to promote the album.

At the 2011 Latin Grammy Awards ceremony, Sale el Sol won the award for Best Female Pop Vocal Album and was also nominated for Album of the Year. A success throughout Europe and Latin America, the album reached number one on the charts in Belgium, France, Italy, Mexico, Portugal and Spain. In the United States, it debuted at number seven on the Billboard 200 chart and at number one on both the Top Latin Albums and Latin Pop Albums charts. Sale el Sol attained numerous record certifications in several regions across the globe, including multi-platinum certifications in Italy, Mexico, Spain, Switzerland and Poland, and diamond certifications in Brazil, France, Colombia and United States (Latin).

== Background ==
In October 2009, Shakira released her eighth studio album, She Wolf. The composition of the record shifted from her more traditional Latin pop and pop rock styles, and was primarily an electropop album with combined elements of world and dancehall. The album was positively received by most music critics and was praised for its distinguished nature and Shakira's experimentation with electropop. Commercially, She Wolf was a success and topped charts and attained gold and platinum certifications in several South American and European territories. In May 2010, she wrote and recorded "Waka Waka (This Time for Africa)", the official song of the 2010 FIFA World Cup, which became a worldwide hit.

== Production ==
Following the worldwide success of "Waka Waka (This Time for Africa)", Shakira soon began work on her ninth studio album Sale el Sol. She decided to experiment with merengue music on the album, saying "I grew up listening to merengue—that was a big part of my life, and I was missing it." Merengue is recognized as the national music of the Dominican Republic and the singer travelled to the country to work with Dominican songwriter and record producer El Cata, resulting in songs like "Loca" and "Rabiosa". Shakira said that the recording of the two songs took place in "this tiny studio in the middle of nowhere", and that "it wasn't planned, I was just following my instincts. So this album is very genuine, and very personal as well".

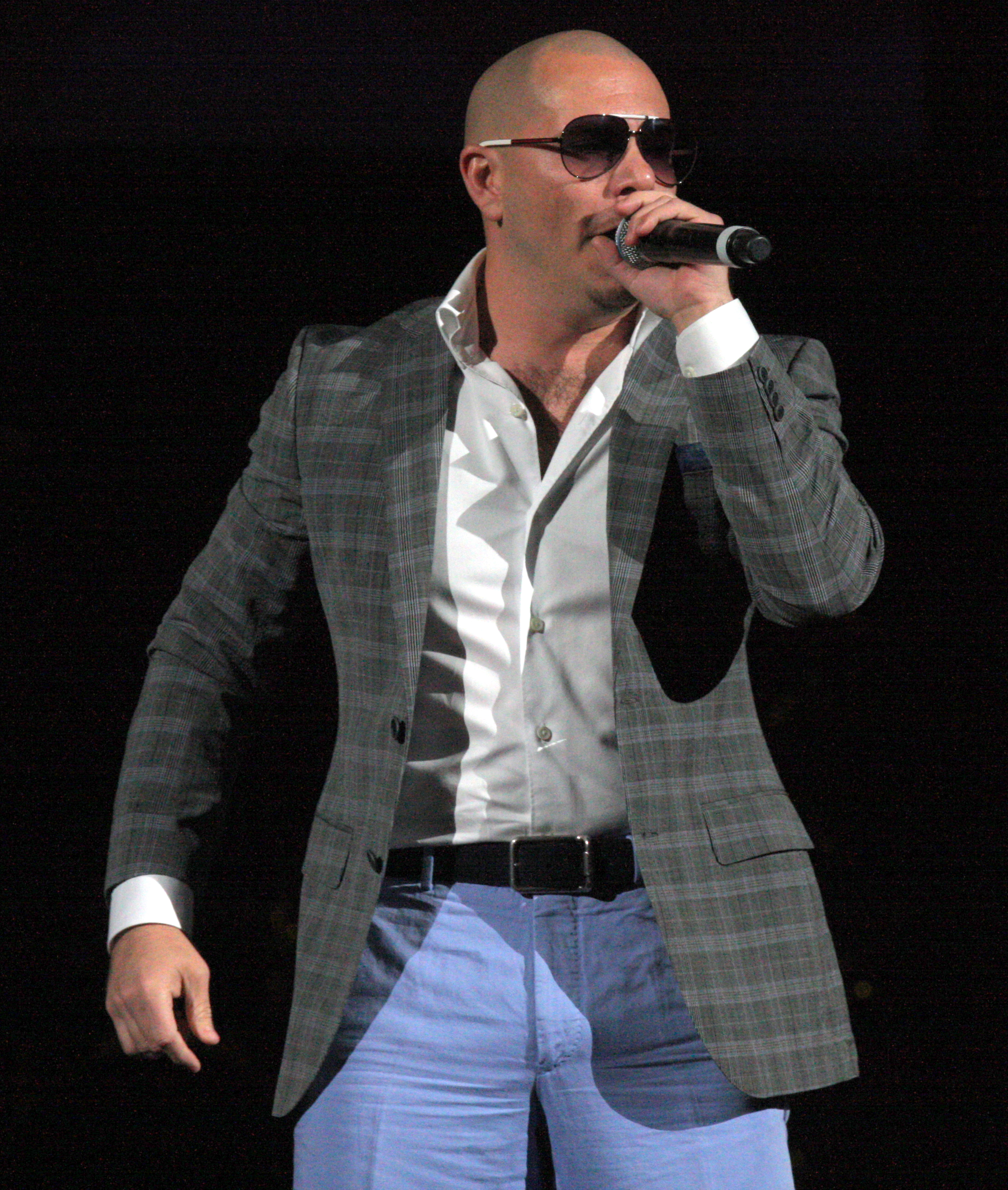
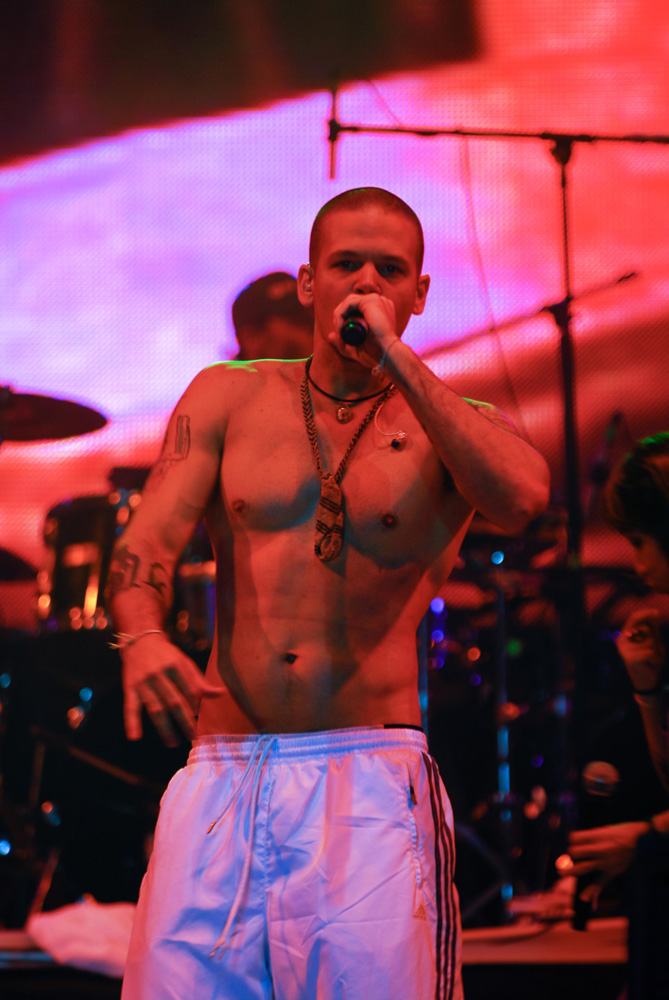
Fellow Latin rappers Pitbull (left), and Residente Calle 13 (right), appear as featured artists on the songs "Rabiosa" (English version) and "Gordita", respectively.

Other collaborators on the album include Armando Pérez, better known by his stage name Pitbull, Shakira's friend and frequent collaborator Luis Fernando Ochoa, René Pérez Joglar, better known by his stage name "Residente Calle 13", John Hill, Lester Mendez, Albert Menéndez, Tim Mitchell and Jorge Drexler. Shakira co-wrote and co-produced every track on the album, with the exception of "Islands". The recording of the album took place at locations such as The Bahamas, London, Barcelona and the Dominican Republic, and was engineered by Andros Rodriguez.

Armando Pérez, who co-wrote the tracks "Loca" and "Rabiosa", talked about Shakira's previous album She Wolf, saying "on the last album they tried to Americanize Shakira by giving her the big producers. Not that it was necessarily a bad thing, but it’s just not her". Talking about his collaboration with Shakira, El Cata revealed that she told him "You have something that makes me move". Cata responded by telling Shakira that "it was the percussion" and "Those sounds that you want, I have them in my studio.", which led to a recording session between the two. He appears as a featured artist on the Spanish version of "Loca".

René Pérez Joglar, who performs as the lead singer of Puerto Rican alternative hip hop band under the name of Residente, appears as a featured artist on the track "Gordita". He explained the conception of the song, in which he raps about the fact that "he liked Shakira better when – early in her career: she was chubbier, had dark hair and was a rock chick", by saying that "I told her (Shakira) it was a good idea to make fun of yourself. That way the haters can't say anything, because you already said it". British rapper Dizzee Rascal appears as a featured artist on the English version of "Loca". He said that he felt "honoured" that Shakira chose him for the song, by saying that "She's a bit of a trendsetter -- she does loads of different things on a major scale. You'd expect her to use an American rapper (for the song), but she chose me. It meant a lot".

== Music and lyrics ==
Sale el Sol is considered to be Shakira's return to her "roots" and is a "fusion between rock and pop heavily influenced from Latino and Colombian music". Shakira said there are three "directions" of Sale el Sol: a romantic one, a "very rock and roll" one, and a "Latino, tropical" one. Explaining the romantic "direction" of the album, she said that it was something "which I hadn't tapped into for the past three years, but it suddenly came to me and I couldn't hold it back. So it’s [the album has] got songs that are very intense, very romantic [sic]". Examples include ballads like "Antes de las Seis" ("Before Six O'Clock") and "Lo Que Más" ("The Most"); in the former Shakira delivers "sad, emotional, and heartfelt vocals," while in the latter she sings over a piano and string-supplemented melody. About the rock and roll "direction" of the album, Shakira said "I started my career as a rock artist and then I kind of crossed over into pop, so it’s been fun to re-encounter that side of my artistic personality".

It’s like I found myself again. You get influenced by everything you hear on the radio, or maybe by what you feel that other people’s expectations are. But then you suddenly realize that everything you need to write about is what’s inside of you – to not look outside but inside.

— Shakira, on the conception of the album., New York Times

The title track is an acoustic guitar-driven alternative rock and Latin pop-infused song, while "Devoción" ("Devotion") is a techno-influenced alternative rock track in which Shakira "beats all U2-inspired arena rockers at their own game," according to AllMusic critic Stephen Thomas Erlewine. The "sultry, energetic, bass-laden" "Tu Boca" ("Your Mouth") finds influences from new wave music. "Islands" is a cover of the original song of the same name by English indie pop band The xx. Shakira adds a few house music elements to the original art pop song.

Shakira "Loca" (2010)
A 17 second sample of the English version of "Loca", which is one of the merengue-influenced tracks on Sale el Sol.

The "Latino" and tropical side of the album is prominently influenced by merengue music. The genre is characterized by the use of the accordion and the percussion instrument tambora. "Loca" ("Crazy"), is Shakira's interpretation of El Cata's song "Loca Con Su Tiguere", and is composed of horn-heavy merengue beats set over techno dance percussion beats. Similarly, "Rabiosa" ("Rabid") is Shakira's interpretation of El Cata's song "La Rabiosa", and is a fast-paced merengue-influenced dance track. In addition to merengue, songs like "Addicted to You", which features "bilingual lyrics, a very 70's chorus and Copacabana sounds", are influenced by reggaeton music. "Gordita" ("Chubby"), a duet between Residente Calle 13 and Shakira, is a cumbia and Latin rap hybrid.

Talking about the album's lyrical content, Shakira said that there are some songs "that are just to dance to in a club, that don’t have a big transcendence". In "Rabiosa", Shakira sings about her partner's sex appeal. "Loca" expresses Shakira's erratic and obsessive behaviour towards her lover, more so than his other leading lady. However, Shakira also said that there are some songs which "will remain in people’s hearts and people’s consciousness, sometimes forever". She described these tracks as "songs that have the power to feed people’s relationships and states of mind and states of spirit". According to Billboard, the title track is composed of "evocative and hopeful" lyrics which are dedicated to Argentine singer-songwriter and Shakira's friend Gustavo Cerati, who had been in a coma around the time of the release of the album. "Antes de las Seis" deals with issues of longing, regrets and loneliness. Shakira said these songs are written "in such a personal and intimate way that at that moment. I'm not really thinking much. I'm just letting it all out".

== Release and promotion ==
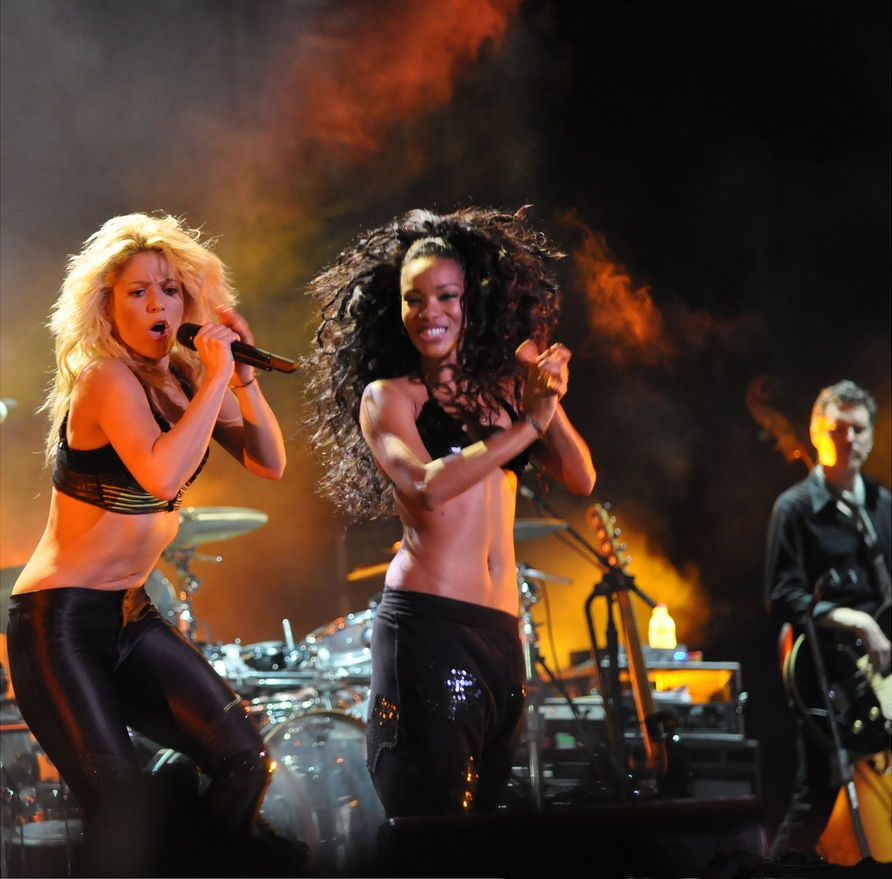
Shakira performing the lead single "Loca" on The Sun Comes Out World Tour in Singapore

Sale el Sol was released worldwide on 19 October 2010. The album was made available for digital downloading on the iTunes Store on the same day. An English titled version of the album, The Sun Comes Out, was also released and contains exactly the same track list; the only difference being in the running order as the Spanish versions of "Loca" and "Rabiosa", featuring El Cata, are included as bonus tracks, while the English versions, featuring Dizzee Rascal and Pitbull, respectively, are included on the main track list.

=== Singles ===
"Loca" was chosen as the lead single from the album; the Spanish version, featuring El Cata, was released on 10 September 2010, while the English version, featuring Dizzee Rascal, was released on 13 September 2010. It became an international success. It peaked atop the charts of countries like France, Italy, Spain and Switzerland. In the United States, the song peaked at number 32 on the Billboard Hot 100 chart, and also topped the Hot Latin Songs, Latin Pop Airplay, and Tropical Songs charts. "Loca" was certified double-platinum in Mexico and Spain by the Mexican Association of Phonograph Producers and the Producers of Spanish Music. It also attained platinum certifications in Italy and Switzerland. The accompanying music video for "Loca", directed by Jaume de Laiguana, was filmed in Barcelona, Spain, and features Shakira interacting with a beach crowd, and dancing in front of the sea wearing a golden bikini.

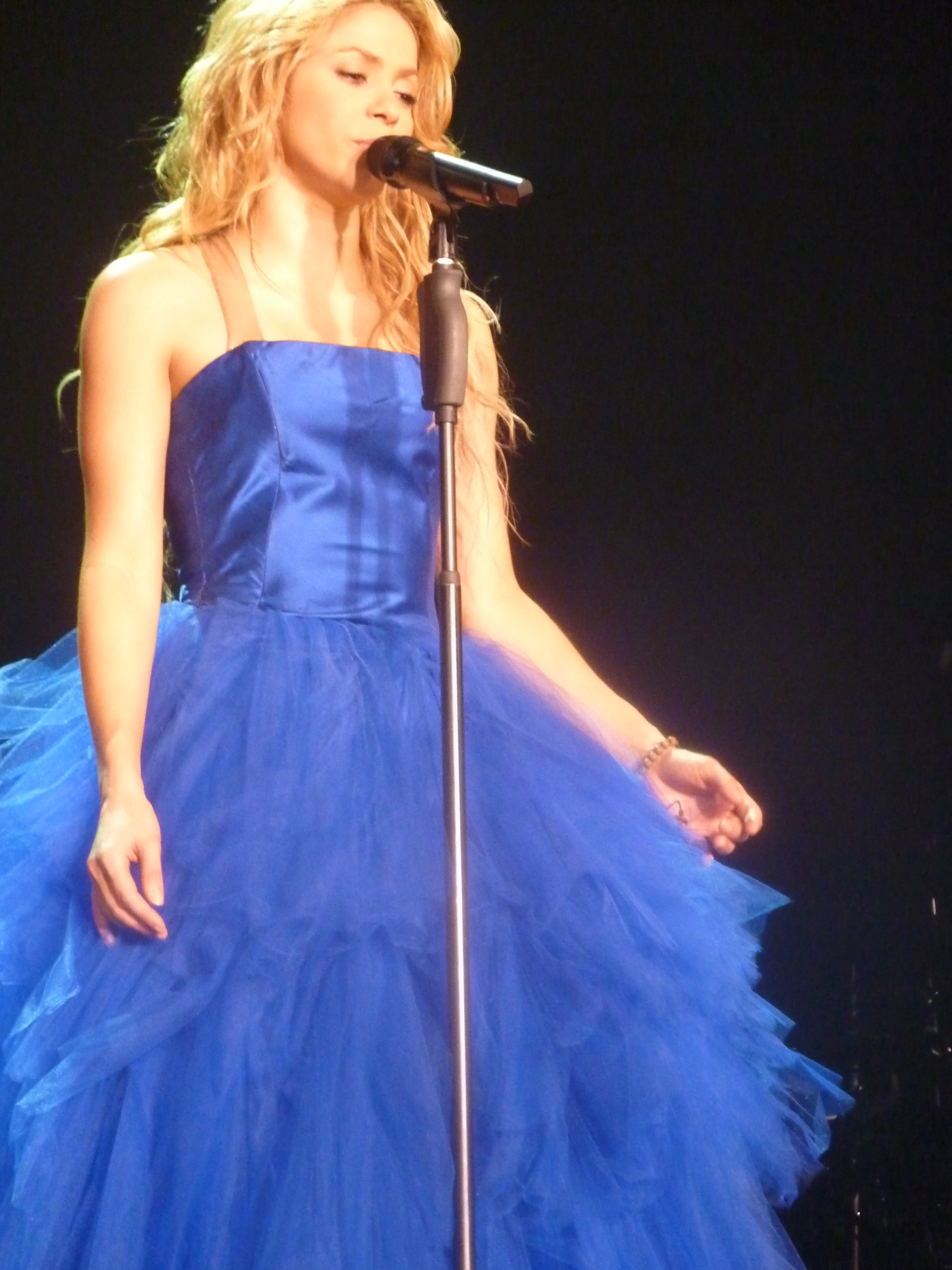
Shakira performing "Antes de las Seis" during The Sun Comes Out World Tour dressed in a "feathery blue dress".

"Sale el Sol", the title track of the album, was released as the second single on 4 January 2011. The song charted very limitedly but managed to perform well in Mexico and Spain, peaking at numbers one and eight on the Monitor Latino and Spanish Singles Chart, respectively. It was certified gold in both countries. "Sale el Sol" peaked at numbers 10 and two on the US Billboard Hot Latin Songs and Latin Pop Airplay charts, respectively. The accompanying music video was directed by Jaume de Laiguana, and contains scenes of Shakira finding her way out of large maze and finally emerging outside to a sunny garden.

"Rabiosa" was chosen to be the third single off the album; both the Spanish and English versions of the song, featuring El Cata and Pitbull, respectively, were released on 8 April 2011. A commercial success, it topped the chart of Spain, and reached top ten positions in countries like Austria, Belgium, and Italy. A success on the Latin record charts in the United States, it peaked at number eight on both the Billboard Hot Latin Songs chart and Latin Pop Airplay chart, and also peaked at number 13 on the Tropical Songs chart. The song was certified double-platinum in Mexico, and platinum in Spain and Italy. The accompanying music video for the single, directed by Jaume De Laiguana, features Shakira enjoying an underground party while sporting a brown bob-cut wig; it also contains scenes of her poledancing while sporting her normal long blonde hair.

"Antes de las Seis" was released as the fourth single on 21 October 2011. It wasn't successful on singles chart but performed moderately well on airplay charts, topping the airplay chart in Spain and peaking at number four on the US Billboard Latin Pop Airplay chart. It is the only song from the album to miss the top 10 of the US Billboard Hot Latin Songs chart. In 2013, "Antes de las Seis" was certified gold in Mexico. The live recording of Shakira's performance of the song during the Palais Omnisports de Paris-Bercy concert show of The Sun Comes Out World Tour, taken from the live album Live from Paris, served as the accompanying music video for the single.

"Addicted to You" was released as the fifth and final single off Sale el Sol, on 13 March 2012. It became a success in Mexico, where it received a platinum certification, and Poland, where it topped the airplay chart. In the United States, it peaked at number nine on the US Billboard Hot Latin Songs chart, and at number three on both the Latin Pop Airplay and Tropical Songs charts. The accompanying music video for "Addicted to You" was directed by Anthony Mandler, and features Shakira dancing in various locations, such as an "old Spanish style" town, a cathedral-like room, and a bathtub, while sporting different "high fashion" outfits.

=== Tour ===
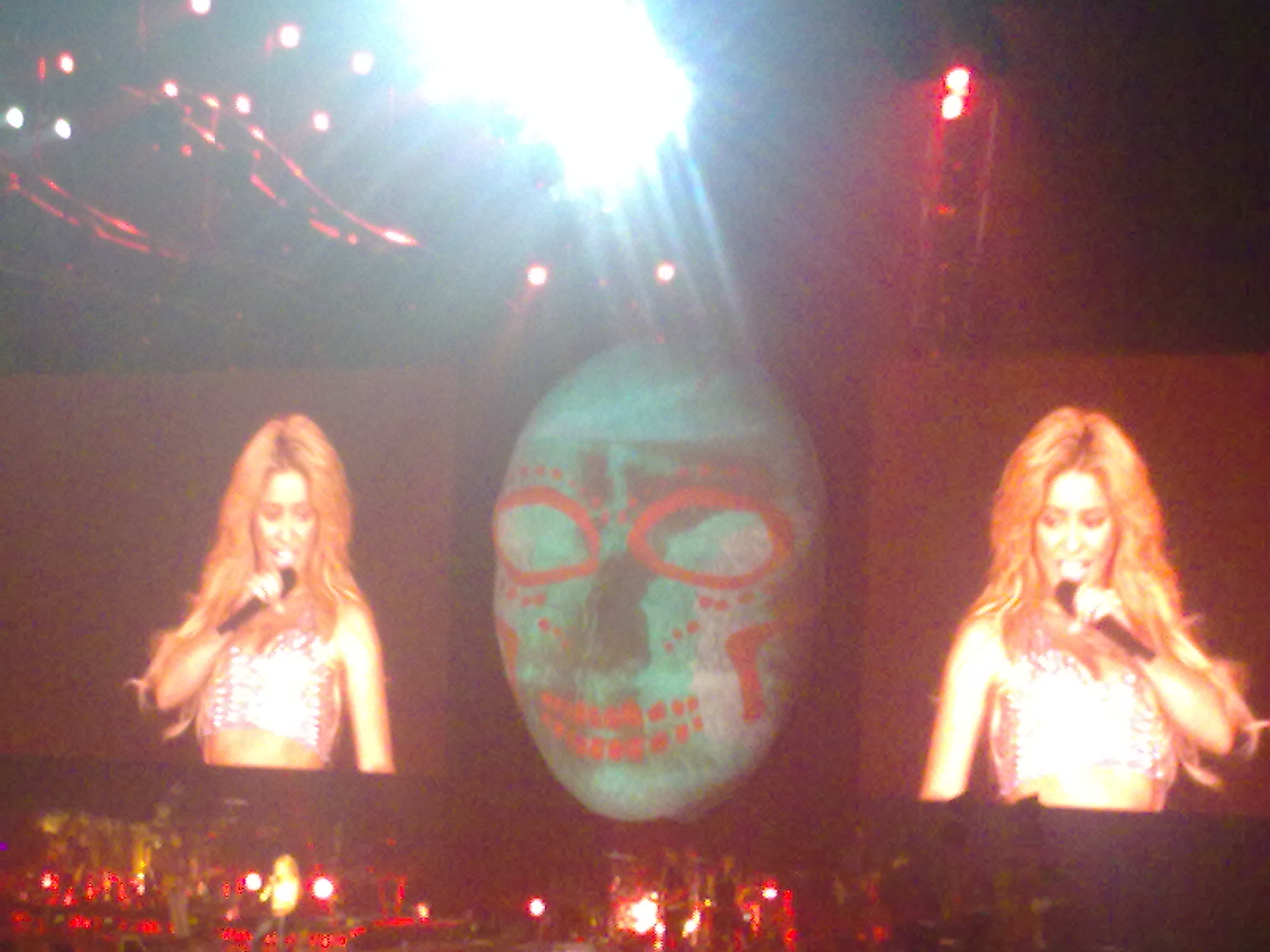
Shakira performing "Gordita" during The Sun Comes Out World Tour

To promote Sale el Sol, as well as She Wolf, Shakira embarked on The Sun Comes Out World Tour in late-2010. Shakira's official website first announced the three initial venues of the North American leg of the tour, on 3 May 2010, and subsequently 22 more venues were listed. After a special tour preview show held in Montreal, Canada, on 15 September 2010, the North American leg of the tour commenced at Uncasville, Connecticut, on 17 September, and closed at Rosemont, Illinois, on 29 October 2010. The initial dates for the European leg of the tour were announced on 28 June 2010, and subsequently 22 more shows were listed. The European leg of the tour was planned to commence at Lyon, France, on 16 November, and end in London, England, on 20 December 2010. The tickets for the initial dates of the European leg were soon sold out, and Shakira extended the tour into 2011, beginning by announcing a show at Paris, France; venues at countries such as Croatia, Russia, Spain and Switzerland were soon added. The Latin American leg of the tour was a part of the Pop Festival, which was heralded as an initiative to bring international music stars to Latin America. Initial tour dates for the leg were announced on 3 December 2010, and soon venues at countries like Argentina, Brazil, Colombia and Mexico were added to the tour dates.

The setlist of the tour was primarily composed of songs from Sale el Sol: "Antes de las Seis", "Gordita", "Loca", "Sale el Sol" and "Waka Waka (This Time for Africa)". The stage was shaped like the letter "T" to enable the maximum number of viewers to see Shakira easily. A large screen was set behind the stage, on which various visuals, designed by entertainment branding agency Loyalkaspar, were projected. For the performances, Shakira mainly wore a mesh gold crop top coupled with skin-tight leather pants. Other attires Shakira wore during the concert shows included a hooded pink gown, a flamenco-skirt, and a feathery blue dress.

The concert shows were well-received by critics, many of whom praised the charisma Shakira displayed during the performances. Commercially, the tour was a success. It ranked at number 40 on Pollstar's 2010 year-end "Top 50 North American Tours" list as it grossed a total of $16.9 million in the continent, with total ticket sales amounting up to 524,723. In North America, the tour sold an average of 9,335 tickets, and a total of 205,271 tickets. The tour was a bigger success worldwide, ranking at number 20 on Pollstar's 2011 "Top 25 Worldwide Tours". Its total gross during its worldwide dates was of $53.2 million and ticket sales amounted up to 692,064. A live album of the show held at the Palais Omnisports de Paris-Bercy in Paris, France, was released as Shakira: Live from Paris, on 5 December 2011.

== Critical reception ==
Professional ratings
Aggregate scores
Source	Rating
Metacritic	89/100
Review scores
Source	Rating
AllMusic	4.5/5 stars
Billboard	91/100
Entertainment Weekly	A
Rolling Stone	3.5/5 stars
Seattle Post-Intelligencer	favourable
Stanford Daily	favourable
Terra USA	mixed
Tom Hull	A−
The Washington Post	favourable

At Metacritic, which assigns a normalized rating out of 100 to reviews from mainstream critics, Sale el Sol received an average score of 89 based on 5 reviews, indicating "universal acclaim". Stephen Thomas Erlewine from AllMusic gave it a very positive review, complimenting Shakira's versatility in her "pan-global approach", and praising the album's simple and "breezy" nature, saying it "never once sounds disparate or overworked -- it's sunny and easy, its natural buoyancy disguising Shakira's range and skill -- but listen closely and it becomes apparent that nobody makes better pop records in the new millennium than she does". The Billboard review of the album was also extremely positive, noting that its composition is "infinitely more memorable and unique than the singer's baffling 2009 set, She Wolf", and that it "manages to bridge the divide between the old and new Shakira with a spark that keeps you listening to the very end".

Michelle Morgante from Boston.com chose the merengue-influenced songs of Sale el Sol as "some of its strongest moments", and noted that the album is a "truer representation of the Shakira who has excited Latin America and propelled her onto the world stage". James Reed from The Boston Globe felt that while Sale el Sol "isn't as heady as She Wolf", it proves to be "another step forward for an artist who rarely looks back". Mikael Good from Entertainment Weekly termed Sale el Sol as a demonstration of "Shakira's boldly global mindset" and awarded it a perfect "A" grade. Jesus Yanez-Reyes from Northern Arizona News favoured the album's rock-influenced tracks and concluding that Sale el Sol "is one of Shakira’s best releases, with songs sure to become classics within the next year". Mikel Toombs from Seattle Post-Intelligencer said that the album features Shakira "at her most upbeat". Jennifer Schaffer from Stanford Daily called Sale el Sol a "fantastically diverse album with some awesome collaborations and a truly impressive range of emotions", and commended Shakira's vocal delivery, saying "the sheer power of Shakira's vocal chords is clearly the focus of the album". Allison Stewart felt the album was a showcase for Shakira's "remarkable" voice, and concluded that while Sale el Sol is not "necessarily adventurous", it "provides a better showcase for Shakira's countless charms than its predecessors ever did". Carlos Macias from Terra USA, however, gave the album a mixed review and said it "delivers half the goods".

=== Accolades and recognition ===
Sale el Sol was included in AllMusic's "Favorite Albums of 2010" and "Favorite Latin Albums of 2010" year-end lists. At the 2011 Latin Grammy Awards ceremony, Sale el Sol was nominated for "Album of the Year" and "Best Female Pop Vocal Album", winning the award in the latter category. At the 2011 Billboard Music Awards Sale el Sol was nominated for "Top Latin Album", but lost it to Spanish singer-songwriter Enrique Iglesias's album Euphoria. At the 2011 Latin Billboard Music Awards, the album won the award for "Latin Digital Album of the Year", and Shakira won the award for "Top Latin Albums Artist of the Year, Female". At the 2011 Premios Juventud awards ceremony, the album was nominated for "Lo Toco Todo. CD Favorito" ("Your Favorite CD"). At the 2011 Premios Shock awards ceremony, it was nominated Album of the Year.

At the 2012 Premios Lo Nuestro awards ceremony, Sale el Sol won the award for "Pop Album of the Year". At the 2012 Premios Oye! awards ceremony, it was nominated for "Spanish Album of the Year". At the 2012 Premios Nuestra Tierra award ceremony, it was nominated "Best Album of the Year".

In December 2019, Allmusic included the album in their list of the decade's 200 best albums.

Billboard included Sale El Sol among the 50 best Latin albums of the 2010s decade, stating that with this album "Shakira showed that gender did not define success in any genre".

== Commercial performance ==
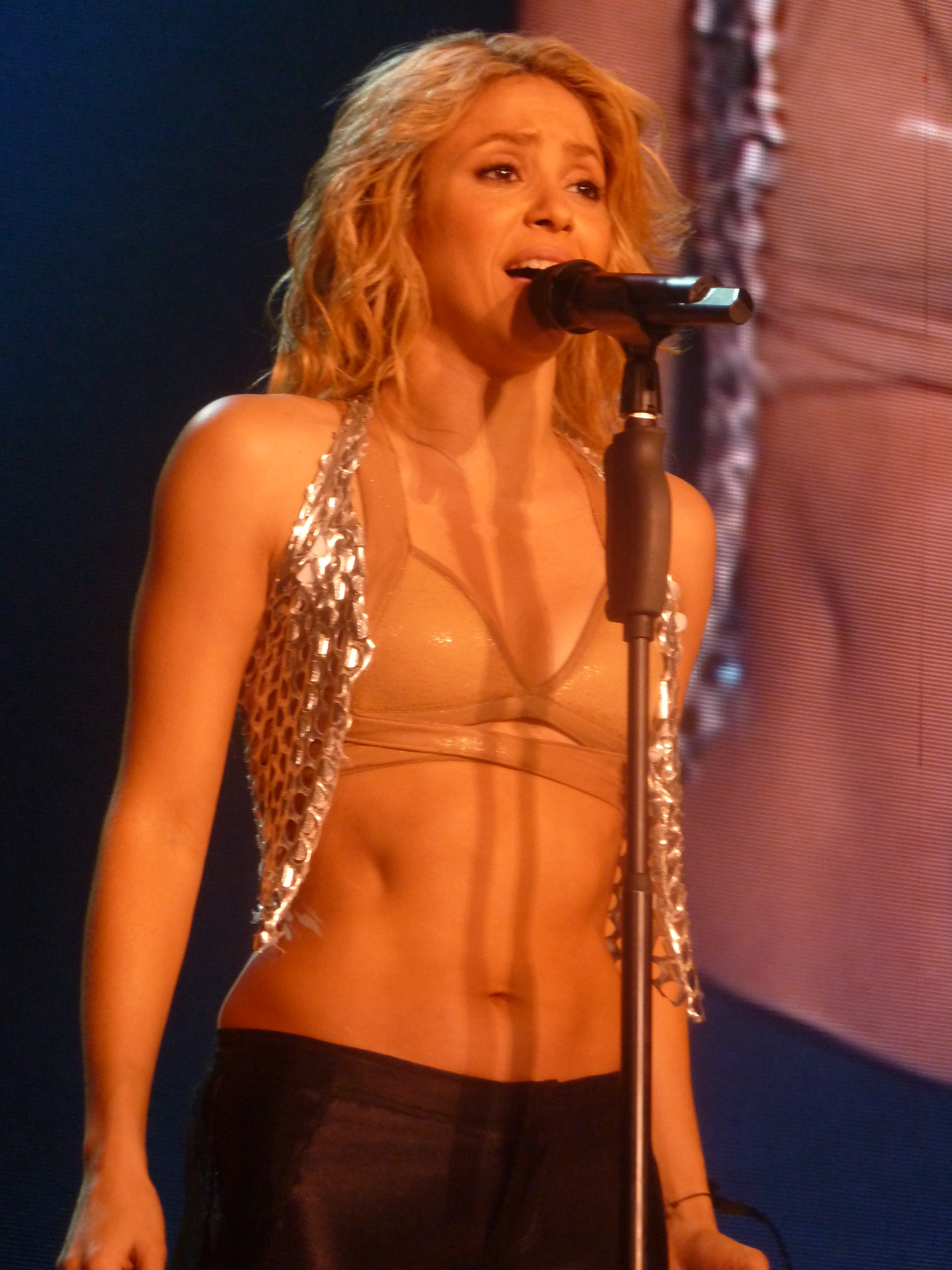
Shakira performing the title-track "Sale el Sol" during The Sun Comes Out World Tour

The album was a success in Europe. In Austria, Sale el Sol entered and peaked at number three on the Austrian Albums Chart, spending a total of 44 weeks on the chart. In this region, it was certified platinum by the International Federation of the Phonographic Industry (IFPI) for selling 20,000 units. The album debuted at number 15 on the Ultratop chart in the Dutch-speaking Flanders region of Belgium and jumped to its peak position of number eight the following week. It entered the chart at the same debut position in the French-speaking Wallonia region of the country but saw more success as it later peaked at number one, displacing French pop rock duo AaRON's album Birds in the Storm from the top spot. Sale el Sol became Shakira's first studio album to reach at number one in the region. In Flanders and Wallonia, the album charted for 55 and 54 weeks, respectively. The Belgian Entertainment Association (BEA) certified the album platinum for sales of 20,000 units.

After entering the French Albums Chart at number two, Sale el Sol peaked at number one for two consecutive weeks, propelled by the success of the lead single "Loca" in the country. It spent 17 consecutive weeks inside the top 10 and 113 weeks in the top 200, making it Shakira's longest charting album in the country. It finished as the 13th best-selling album of 2010 in France, with sales of 236,616 units. The album additionally sold 198,000 units in 2011, appearing at number 10 on the year-end chart and bringing its total sales to 425,000 units. In addition to being her first album to top the French Albums chart, Sale el Sol is also Shakira's highest-certified album in the country as it was certified diamond by the Syndicat National de l'Édition Phonographique (SNEP) for sales of 500,000 units. It is one of the best-selling albums in France. By contrast, Sale el Sol became the singer's lowest charting studio-album in Germany, peaking at number six on the Media Control Charts. However, it achieved high sales in the country and was certified platinum by The Federal Association of Music Industry (BVMI) for having shipped 200,000 units in Germany. The album was certified platinum by the Association of Hungarian Record Companies for sales of 10,000 units.

In Italy, it debuted at number three on the FIMI Albums chart and ascended to number one the following week. Sale el Sol was Shakira's second consecutive album to peak atop the Italian albums chart, after She Wolf topped the chart in 2009. Its stay inside the top 20 lasted for 19 weeks. The Federazione Industria Musicale Italiana (FIMI) certified the album platinum for sales of 60,000 units. Sale el Sol debuted atop the Portuguese Albums Chart — Shakira's first album to accomplish the feat in the country – and spent two weeks at number one. It was able to stay within the top 10 for 23 consecutive weeks. It was certified platinum by the Associação Fonográfica Portuguesa (AFP) for selling 15,000 units in Portugal. Sale el Sol was Shakira's first studio album since Fijación Oral, Vol. 1 (2005) to peak at number one on the Spanish Albums chart after it debuted at the top position. It spent a total of 63 weeks on the chart and was certified double-platinum by the Producers of Spanish Music (PROMUSICAE) for shipments of 80,000 units. Sale el Sol entered and peaked at number two on the Swiss Albums Chart, where it charted for 49 weeks in total. It was certified double-platinum by for selling 40,000 units in the country.

The album also saw success in South America. In Shakira's native country Colombia, it sold in excess of 200,000 units and was certified diamond by the Colombian Association of Phonograph Producers (ASINCOL). In Mexico, Sale el Sol debuted at number one on the Mexican Albums Chart, becoming the singer's second consecutive studio album to enter the chart at the top position. It also became her longest-charting album in the country, spending a total of 50 weeks. In this region, it was certified platinum and gold by the Mexican Association of Phonograph Producers (AMPROFON) for shipments of 90,000 units. In Canada, the album peaked at number 11 on the Canadian Albums Chart, spending a total of two weeks on the chart. In Peru, it was the seventh best selling album of the year in 2011.

In the United States, Sale el Sol debuted and peaked at number seven on the Billboard 200 issue dated 6 November 2010. On the Latin Albums chart, Sale el Sol debuted at number one with first-week sales amounting up to 52,000 units, as compiled by Nielson SoundScan. It marked the highest debut for a Latin album for the year and was Shakira's fifth album to peak at number one. According to Billboard, 35% of its first-week sales were credited to strong digital sales. In total, Sale el Sol spent 207 weeks on the Top Latin Albums chart. On the Latin Pop Albums chart, it again peaked at number one and spent 571 weeks (more than a decade) on the chart in total, the most among all albums in the chart's history. The album was certified Diamond in the Latin field in 2018 by the Recording Industry Association of America signifying 600,000 album-equivalent units sold. Sale El Sol ranks at No. 14 among the most successful Latin albums of the 2010s decade in the United States.

== Track listing ==
Sale el Sol standard edition track listing
No.	Title	Writer(s)	Producer(s)	Length
1.	"Sale el Sol"	Shakira; Luis Fernando Ochoa	Shakira; Ochoa	3:21
2.	"Loca" (featuring El Cata)	Shakira; El Cata; Pitbull	Shakira; Ochoa^{[a]}; Josh Abraham^{[a]}; Oligee^{[a]}; El Cata^{[a]}; Gucci Vump^{[b]}; Jonathan Shakhovskoy^{[b]}	3:05
3.	"Antes de las Seis"	Shakira; Lester Méndez	Shakira; Méndez	2:56
4.	"Gordita" (featuring Residente)	Shakira; Calle 13	Shakira; Calle 13; John Hill^{[a]}; Diplo^{[b]}	3:26
5.	"Addicted to You"	Shakira; El Cata; Ochoa; Hill	Shakira; Ochoa^{[a]}; El Cata^{[a]}; Hill^{[b]}	2:28
6.	"Lo Que Más"	Shakira; Albert Menéndez	Shakira; Méndez^{[a]}	2:29
7.	"Mariposas"	Shakira; Menéndez	Shakira; Menéndez^{[a]}	3:47
8.	"Rabiosa" (featuring El Cata)	Shakira; Pitbull; El Cata	Shakira; Ochoa^{[a]}; Abraham^{[a]}; Oligee^{[a]}; El Cata^{[a]}; Jim Jonsin^{[b]}	2:52
9.	"Devoción"	Shakira; Gustavo Cerati; Jorge Drexler; Hill; Sam Endicott	Shakira; Hill	3:31
10.	"Islands"	Baria Qureshi; Oliver Sim; Jamie Smith; Romy Madly Croft	Shakira; Lukas Burton	2:45
11.	"Tu Boca"	Shakira; Cerati; Drexler; Menéndez; Tim Mitchell	Shakira; Hill^{[a]}; Cerati^{[a]}	3:27
12.	"Waka Waka (Esto es África)" (K-Mix)	Shakira; Drexler; Hill; Emile Kojidie; Dooh Belly Eugene Victor; Ze Bell Jean Paul	Shakira; Hill	3:07
13.	"Loca" (featuring Dizzee Rascal) (bonus track)	Shakira; El Cata; Dizzee Rascal; Pitbull	Shakira; Ochoa^{[a]}; Abraham^{[a]}; Oligee^{[a]}; El Cata^{[a]}; Gucci Vump^{[b]}	3:13
14.	"Rabiosa" (featuring Pitbull) (bonus track)	Shakira; Pitbull; El Cata	Shakira; Ochoa^{[a]}; Abraham^{[a]}; Oligee^{[a]}; El Cata^{[a]}; Jim Jonsin^{[b]}	2:52
15.	"Waka Waka (This Time for Africa)" (K-Mix) (bonus track)	Shakira; Hill; Kojidie; Victor; Paul	Shakira; Hill	3:07
Total length:				46:04

Sale el Sol – Digital edition bonus track
No.	Title	Writer(s)	Producer(s)	Length
16.	"Loca" (Freemasons Remix) (featuring Dizzee Rascal)	Shakira; El Cata; Rascal; Pitbull	Shakira; Ochoa; Abraham; Oligee; El Cata; Vump	3:01

The Sun Comes Out Japanese edition (bonus tracks)
No.	Title	Writer(s)	Producer(s)	Length
16.	"Give It Up to Me" (featuring Lil Wayne and Timbaland)	Shakira; Amanda Ghost; Timothy Mosley; Dwayne Carter	Shakira; Timbaland	3:03
17.	"Did It Again" (featuring Kid Cudi)	Shakira; Pharrell Williams; Scott Mescudi	Shakira; The Neptunes	3:47
18.	"Waka Waka (This Time for Africa)" (The Official 2010 Fifa World Cup Song) (featuring Freshlyground)	Shakira; Hill; Kojidie; Victor; Paul; Drexler	Shakira; Hill	3:22

Sale El Sol – Colombian, Ecuadorian, Peruvian edition (bonus tracks)
No.	Title	Writer(s)	Length
16.	"Gitana"	Shakira; Amanda Ghost; Dench; Struken; Rogers; Drexler
17.	"Waka Waka (Esto Es África)" (Sharam Radio Edit) (featuring Freshlyground)	Shakira; Hill; Kojidie; Victor; Paul; Drexler
18.	"Waka Waka (Esto Es África)" (Havana Funk Remix) (featuring Freshlyground)	Shakira; Hill; Kojidie; Victor; Paul; Drexler
19.	"Loca" (Freemasons Spanish Club Edit) (featuring El Cata)	Shakira; El Cata; Pitbull
20.	"Loca" (Brodicat Beat Beep Remix By Brodicat AKA Brodinski And Mikix The Cat) (featuring El Cata)	Shakira; El Cata; Pitbull
21.	"Loca" (Static Revenger Mix Radio Edit) (featuring El Cata)	Shakira; El Cata; Pitbull

Sale el Sol – 2024 LP expanded edition bonus tracks
No.	Title	Writer(s)	Producer(s)	Length
12.	"Waka Waka (Esto es África)" (The Official; 2010 Fifa World Cup Song; featuring Freshlyground)		Shakira; Hill
13.	"Loca" (featuring Dizzee Rascal)	Shakira; El Cata; Dizzee Rascal; Pitbull	Shakira; Ochoa^{[a]}; Abraham^{[a]}; Oligee^{[a]}; El Cata^{[a]}; Gucci Vump^{[b]}	3:13
14.	"Rabiosa" (featuring Pitbull)	Shakira; Pitbull; El Cata	Shakira; Ochoa^{[a]}; Abraham^{[a]}; Oligee^{[a]}; El Cata^{[a]}; Jim Jonsin^{[b]}	2:52
15.	"Waka Waka (This Time for Africa)" (The Official; 2010 Fifa World Cup Song; featuring Freshlyground)		Shakira; Hill	3:22
16.	"Loca" (Freemasons Spanish Club Edit) (featuring El Cata)	Shakira; El Cata; Pitbull
17.	"Waka Waka (Esto es África)" (K-Mix)	Shakira; Drexler; Hill; Emile Kojidie; Dooh Belly Eugene Victor; Ze Bell Jean Paul	Shakira; Hill	3:07
18.	"Waka Waka (This Time for Africa)" (K-Mix)	Shakira; Hill; Kojidie; Victor; Paul	Shakira; Hill	3:07

Sale el Sol – Germany edition
No.	Title	Lyrics	Music	Production	Length
1.	"Sale el Sol"	Shakira; Luis Fernando Ochoa	Shakira; Ochoa	Shakira; Ochoa	3:21
2.	"Loca" (featuring Dizzee Rascal)	Shakira; El Cata; Dizzee Rascal; Pitbull	Shakira; El Cata; Dizzee Rascal; Pitbull	Shakira; Ochoa^{[a]}; Abraham^{[a]}; Oligee^{[a]}; El Cata^{[a]}; Gucci Vump^{[b]}	3:13
3.	"Antes de las Seis"	Shakira; Lester Méndez	Shakira; Méndez	Shakira; Méndez	2:56
4.	"Gordita" (featuring Residente Calle 13)	Shakira; Calle 13	Shakira; Calle 13	Shakira; Calle 13; John Hill^{[a]}; Diplo^{[b]}	3:26
5.	"Addicted to You"	Shakira; El Cata; Ochoa; Hill	Shakira; El Cata; Ochoa; Hill	Shakira; Ochoa^{[a]}; El Cata^{[a]}; Hill^{[b]}	2:28
6.	"Lo Que Más"	Shakira; Albert Menéndez	Shakira; Menéndez	Shakira; Méndez^{[a]}	2:29
7.	"Mariposas"	Shakira; Menéndez	Shakira; Menéndez	Shakira; Menéndez^{[a]}	3:47
8.	"Rabiosa" (featuring Pitbull)	Shakira; Pitbull; El Cata	Shakira; Pitbull; El Cata	Shakira; Ochoa^{[a]}; Abraham^{[a]}; Oligee^{[a]}; El Cata^{[a]}; Jim Jonsin^{[b]}	2:52
9.	"Devoción"	Shakira; Jorge Drexler	Shakira; Hill; Sam Endicott; Gustavo Cerati	Shakira; Hill	3:31
10.	"Islands"	Baria Qureshi; Oliver Sim; Jamie Smith; Romy Madly Croft	Qureshi; Sim; Smith; Croft	Shakira; Lukas Burton	2:45
11.	"Tu Boca"	Shakira; Drexler	Shakira; Cerati; Menéndez; Tim Mitchell	Shakira; Hill^{[a]}; Cerati^{[a]}	3:27
12.	"Waka Waka (This Time for Africa)" (K-Mix)	Shakira	Shakira; Hill; Kojidie; Victor; Paul	Shakira; Hill	3:07
13.	"Loca" (featuring El Cata) (bonus track)	Shakira; El Cata; Pitbull	Shakira; El Cata; Pitbull	Shakira; Ochoa^{[a]}; Josh Abraham^{[a]}; Oligee^{[a]}; El Cata^{[a]}; Gucci Vump^{[b]}; Jonathan Shakhovskoy^{[b]}	3:05
14.	"Rabiosa" (featuring El Cata) (bonus track)	Shakira; Pitbull; El Cata	Shakira; Pitbull; El Cata	Shakira; Ochoa^{[a]}; Abraham^{[a]}; Oligee^{[a]}; El Cata^{[a]}; Jim Jonsin^{[b]}	2:52
15.	"Waka Waka (Esto es África)" (K-Mix) (bonus track)	Shakira; Drexler	Shakira; Hill; Emile Kojidie; Dooh Belly Eugene Victor; Ze Bell Jean Paul	Shakira; Hill	3:07
16.	"Waka Waka (This Time for Africa)" (The Official; 2010 Fifa World Cup Song; featuring Freshlyground) (bonus track)	Shakira	Shakira; Hill; Kojidie; Victor; Paul	Shakira; Hill	3:22

Notes

- ^{^a} signifies a co-producer
- ^{^b} signifies an additional producer

== Credits and personnel ==
Credits adapted from AllMusic.

- Shakira – art direction, composer, design, lyricist, producer, vocal arrangement, vocals (background)
- Josh Abraham – producer
- Eduardo Bergallo – engineer
- Michael Brauer – mixing
- Will Briere – mixing assistant
- Lukas Burton – producer
- Míguel Bustamante – assistant engineer
- Calle 13 – composer
- El Cata – composer, producer
- Gustavo Celis – engineer, mixing
- Gustavo Cerati – producer
- Olgui Chirino – vocal arrangement, vocals (background)
- Dave Clauss – engineer, mixing
- Dalmata – guest appearance
- Diplo – additional production
- Dizzee Rascal – composer
- Lindiwe Dlamini – vocals (background)
- Thomas Dyani – vocals (background)
- Ryan Gilligan – mixing assistant
- John Hill – additional production, composer, producer
- Mike Horner – mixing assistant
- James McGorman – vocals (background)
- Jim Jonsin – additional production
- Nonhlanhla Kheswa – vocals (background)
- Emile Kojidie – composer
- Jaume Laiguana – art direction, design, photography
- Alex Leader – engineer
- Stephen Marcussen – mastering
- Lester Mendez – composer, mixing, producer
- Albert Menéndez – producer
- Brenda Mhlongo – vocals (background)
- T. Mitchell – composer
- Mark Needham – mixing
- Nejo – guest appearance
- Jessica Nolan – A&R, project supervisor
- Joel Numa – engineer, mixing
- Luis Fernando Ochoa – arranger, producer
- Oligee – producer
- Ze Bell Jean Paul – composer
- Pitbull – composer
- Residente of Calle 13 – producer
- Andros Rodriguez – engineer
- Jonathan Shakhovskoy – additional production, engineer, mixing, vocal arrangement
- Dooh Belly Eugene Victor – composer
- Gucci Vump – additional production
- Ed Williams – engineer

== Charts ==
=== Weekly charts ===
Chart (2010–12)	Peak position
Austrian Albums (Ö3 Austria)	3
Belgian Albums (Ultratop Flanders)	8
Belgian Albums (Ultratop Wallonia)	1
Canadian Albums (Billboard)	11
Croatian Albums (HDU)	1
Czech Albums (ČNS IFPI)	6
Danish Albums (Hitlisten)	27
Dutch Albums (Album Top 100)	10
Finnish Albums (Suomen virallinen lista)	23
French Albums (SNEP)	1
German Albums (Offizielle Top 100)	6
Greek Albums (IFPI)	2
Hungarian Albums (MAHASZ)	4
Italian Albums (FIMI)	1
Japanese Albums (Oricon)	103
Mexican Albums (Top 100 Mexico)	1
Polish Albums (ZPAV)	2
Portuguese Albums (AFP)	1
Russian Albums (2M)	3
Spanish Albums (Promusicae)	1
Swedish Albums (Sverigetopplistan)	19
Swiss Albums (Schweizer Hitparade)	2
US Billboard 200	7
US Top Latin Albums (Billboard)	1
US Latin Pop Albums (Billboard)	1

=== Year-end charts ===
2010 year-end chart performance for Sale el Sol
Chart (2010)	Position
Austrian Albums (Ö3 Austria)	42
Belgian Albums (Ultratop Flanders)	97
Belgian Albums (Ultratop Wallonia)	35
French Albums (SNEP)	11
German Albums (Offizielle Top 100)	53
Hungarian Albums (MAHASZ)	19
Italian Albums (FIMI)	21
Mexican Albums (AMPROFON)	22
Polish Albums (ZPAV)	43
Russian Albums (2M)	35
Spanish Albums (PROMUSICAE)	13
Swiss Albums (Schweizer Hitparade)	13
US Top Latin Albums (Billboard)	6
US Latin Pop Albums (Billboard)	4

2011 year-end chart performance for Sale el Sol
Chart (2011)	Position
Argentine Albums (CAPIF)	5
Austrian Albums (Ö3 Austria)	42
Belgian Albums (Ultratop Flanders)	34
Belgian Albums (Ultratop Wallonia)	16
French Albums (SNEP)	10
Hungarian Albums (MAHASZ)	35
Italian Albums (FIMI)	45
Mexican Albums (AMPROFON)	23
Portuguese Albums (AFP)	7
Spanish Albums (PROMUSICAE)	13
Swiss Albums (Schweizer Hitparade)	15
US Top Latin Albums (Billboard)	4
US Latin Pop Albums (Billboard)	3

2012 year-end chart performance for Sale el Sol
Chart (2012)	Position
US Top Latin Albums (Billboard)	17
US Latin Pop Albums (Billboard)	6

2017 year-end chart performance for Sale el Sol
Chart (2017)	Position
US Top Latin Albums (Billboard)	38
US Latin Pop Albums (Billboard)	9

2018 year-end chart performance for Sale el Sol
Chart (2018)	Position
US Top Latin Albums (Billboard)	49
US Latin Pop Albums (Billboard)	10

=== Decade-end charts ===
2010s decade-end charts for Sale el Sol
Chart (2010s)	Position
US Top Latin Albums (Billboard)	14

== Certifications and sales ==
Region	Certification	Certified units/sales
Argentina (CAPIF)	Platinum	40,000
Austria (IFPI Austria)	Platinum	20,000^{*}
Belgium (BRMA)	Platinum	30,000^{*}
Brazil (Pro-Música Brasil)	Diamond	160,000^{‡}
Canada (Music Canada)	Platinum	80,000^{‡}
Chile	2× Platinum	5,000
Colombia Physical sales	2× Diamond	300,000
Colombia Digital streams	Gold	
Czech Republic	Gold	
France (SNEP)	Diamond	500,000^{*}
Germany (BVMI)	Platinum	200,000^{^}
Hungary (MAHASZ)	Platinum	6,000^{^}
Italy (FIMI)	2× Platinum	120,000^{*}
Mexico (AMPROFON)	Diamond	300,000^{‡}
Peru	Gold	
Poland (ZPAV)	2× Platinum	40,000^{*}
Portugal (AFP)	Platinum	20,000^{^}
Spain (Promusicae)	2× Platinum	120,000^{^}
Sweden (GLF)	Gold	20,000^{‡}
Switzerland (IFPI Switzerland)	2× Platinum	60,000^{^}
United States (RIAA)	Diamond (Latin)	600,000^{‡}
Venezuela	Platinum	
^{*} Sales figures based on certification alone.^{^} Shipments figures based on certification alone.^{‡} Sales+streaming figures based on certification alone.

== See also ==
- 2010 in Latin music
- List of best-selling albums in France
- List of best-selling Latin albums
- List of number-one Billboard Latin Albums from the 2010s
- List of number-one Billboard Latin Pop Albums of 2010
- List of number-one hits of 2010 (France)
- List of number-one hits of 2010 (Italy)
- List of number-one albums of 2010 (Mexico)
- List of number-one albums of 2010 (Spain)
