= Antes de las Seis =

Single by Shakira

from the album Sale el Sol
- Released: 21 October 2011
- Studio: Quad Studios (New York, NY)
- Genre: Latin pop
- Length: 2:55
- Label: Epic
- Songwriters: Shakira; Lester Mendez
- Producers: Shakira; Lester Mendez

Shakira singles chronology
"Rabiosa" (2011)	"Antes de las Seis" (2011)	"Je l'aime à mourir" (2011)

Live video
- "Antes De Las Seis (Live From Paris)" on YouTube

"Antes de las Seis" (English: "Before Six O'Clock") is a song recorded by Colombian singer-songwriter Shakira for her ninth studio album Sale el Sol (2010). Written and produced by the singer and her frequent collaborator Lester Mendez, "Antes de las Seis" is one of the "romantic" songs from the album and is musically a Latin pop ballad. It features a simple piano and acoustic guitar-supplemented beat over which Shakira delivers sad and emotional vocals. Epic Records released the song as the fourth single from Sale el Sol on 21 October 2011.

Critics gave positive reviews to "Antes de las Seis", complimenting its lyrical content. The song performed poorly on singles charts, but was moderately successful on airplay charts. It reached number 1 on the Spanish Airplay Chart and peaked at number 14 on the Monitor Latino chart in Mexico. In the United States, it peaked at numbers 21 and 4 on the Billboard Hot Latin Songs and Latin Pop Airplay charts, respectively. In 2013, "Antes de las Seis" was certified gold in Mexico.

The song was performed during the encore segment of the concert shows of Shakira's The Sun Comes Out World Tour in 2010 and 2011. A recording of its performance at the show in Paris, France, served as the promotional music video of the song. It was also used to promote Shakira's fourth live album Live from Paris.

== Background and composition ==
Shakira "Antes de las Seis" (2010)
15 second sample of the chorus of "Antes de las Seis", in which Shakira delivers sad and emotional vocals over a piano and acoustic guitar beat.

In October 2009, Shakira released her eighth studio album, She Wolf. The composition of the record shifted from her more traditional Latin pop and pop rock styles, and was primarily an electropop album with combined elements of world and folk music. The album was positively received by most music critics and was praised for its distinguished nature and Shakira's experimentation with electropop. Commercially, She Wolf was a success, topping charts and attaining gold and platinum certifications in several South American and European territories. However, it performed poorly in the United States and became Shakira's first studio album since Dónde Están los Ladrones? (1998) to miss charting inside the top 10 when it peaked at number 15 on the US Billboard Hot 200 chart. In May 2010, she wrote and recorded "Waka Waka (This Time for Africa)", the official song of the 2010 FIFA World Cup, which became a worldwide hit.

Following the global success of the song, Shakira began work on her ninth studio album Sale el Sol. She split the album into three "directions," one of which she described as "romantic" in nature. Shakira felt it was something she had not "tapped into for the past three years," and its inclusion in the album resulted in "very intense, very romantic" songs. "Antes de las Seis" is one such song from the album. The Latin pop ballad was written and produced by Shakira and her frequent collaborator Lester Mendez, who had previously worked with her on songs including "Underneath Your Clothes" (2002) and "La Tortura" (2005). The musical instrumentation of the song is simple and consists of a piano and acoustic guitar. According to Jennifer Schaffer from The Stanford Daily, its "softer" production helps in putting the focus on Shakira's voice, which she opined had been "stripped to its sensitive core." The singer delivers sad and emotional vocals that address issues of "longing, regrets and loneliness." Shakira talked about the deep meaning behind the balladry of the album and expressed difficulty in explaining it, saying: "We all go through hard moments. Whatever happened, it's right there in the songs. I've decided that I'm not going to explain every song this time. It's hard to explain a song. These songs explain me better than I can explain them."

== Release and reception ==
"Antes de las Seis" was chosen as the fourth single from Sale el Sol and was made available to digitally download from the iTunes Store on 21 October 2011. An announcement confirming its release as a single appeared on Shakira's official website on 24 October. Although the announcement mentioned that the single would be released to the iTunes Store on 31 October, it had already appeared on there ten days before.

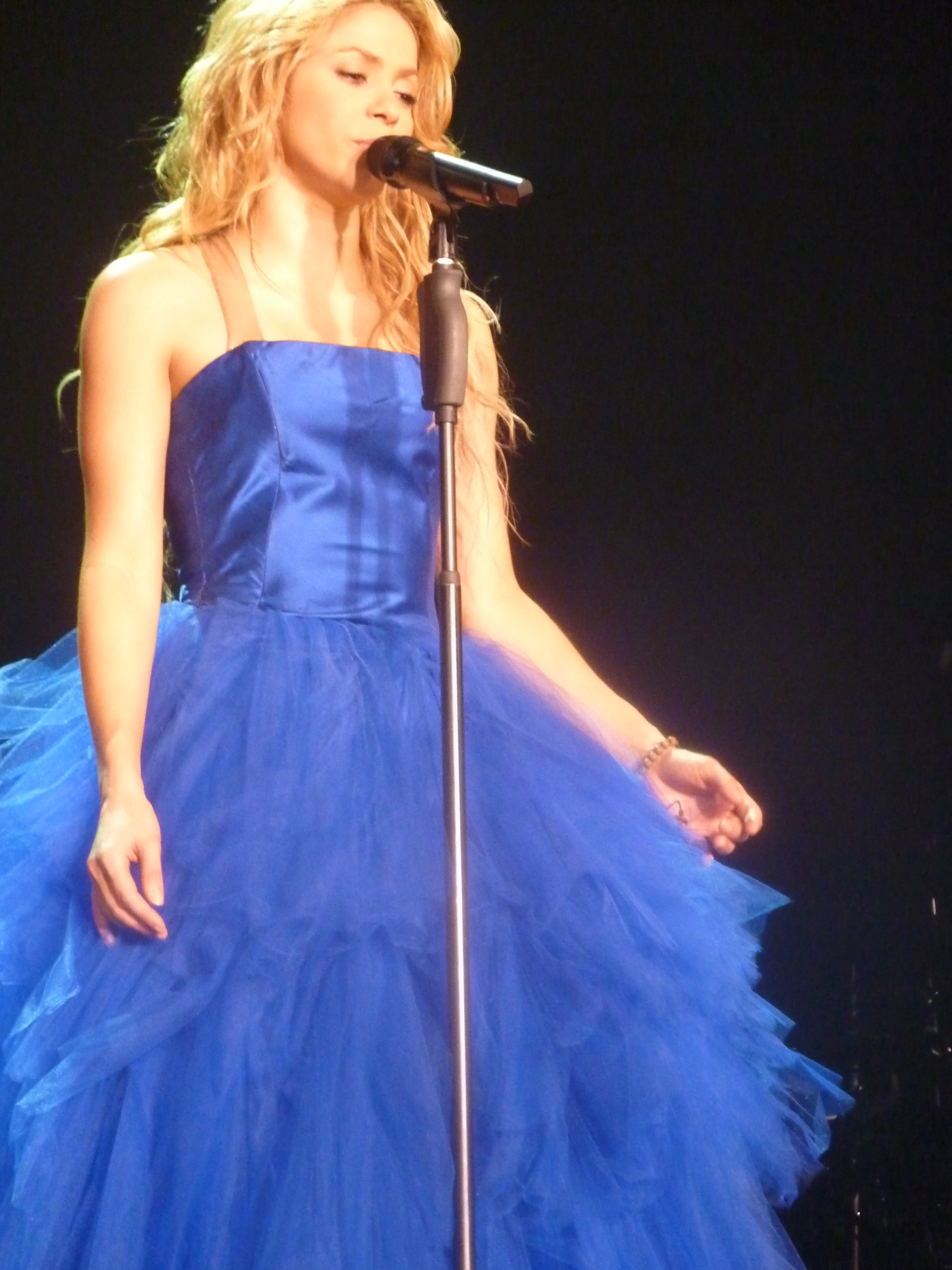
Shakira performing "Antes de las Seis" during The Sun Comes Out World Tour in Paris, France

=== Critical reception ===
"Antes de las Seis" received generally positive reviews from music critics. Stephen Thomas Erlewine from AllMusic highlighted it as an example of Shakira's versatility and commented that the album "catches its breath on the ballad." Mikael Wood from Entertainment Weekly termed the song a "gorgeous ballad" and encouraged readers to download it. Jesus Yanez-Reyes from Northern Arizona News gave "Antes de las Seis" a very positive review and praised its lyrics and Shakira's "heartfelt" vocal delivery as having the ability "to overcome whatever language barriers may exist between the artist and the listener, truly making it a song of note within the release." Jennifer Schaffer from the Stanford Daily complimented the sensitivity of the song and commented that "Shakira offers her listeners a far more vulnerable persona" through it. Carlos Macias from Terra Music picked "Antes de las Seis" as his favourite track from the album and commended its lyrics, calling them "classic Shakira" and concluding that "It'd been a while since the Colombian superstar offered us an insight into her heart." At the Premios Nuestra Tierra awards ceremony in 2012, "Antes de las Seis" was nominated for "Mejor Interpretación Pop Del Año" ("Best Pop Performance of the Year").

=== Chart performance ===
Commercially, the song was moderately successful in Hispanic regions. In Mexico, "Antes de las Seis" peaked at number 14 on the Monitor Latino airplay chart. In Spain, it topped the PROMUSICAE airplay chart, although it failed to chart on the main singles chart. Similarly, the song was successful on the Billboard Latin Pop Airplay chart in the United States, on which it peaked at number 4, but performed poorly on the main Hot Latin Songs chart, reaching only number 21. "Antes de las Seis" is the only single from Sale el Sol to not chart inside the top ten of the Billboard Hot Latin Songs chart. In 2013, the Mexican Association of Phonograph Producers (AMPROFON) certified "Antes de las Seis" gold for selling 30,000 units in Mexico.

== Promotion ==
The song was included on the set list of Shakira's The Sun Comes Out World Tour in 2010 and 2011, and was performed as the opening song of the encore segment of the concert shows. She sang it dressed in a large "feathery" royal blue dress, and towards the end of the performance artificial snow flakes started falling from the sky. A recording of the performance during the concert held at the Palais Omnisports de Paris-Bercy arena in Paris, France, served as the music video of "Antes de las Seis". The video was also used to promote Shakira's fourth live album Live from Paris.

== Charts and certifications ==
=== Weekly charts ===
Chart (2011)	Peak position
Mexico (Monitor Latino)	14
Mexico (Mexico Airplay)	18
South Korea International (Gaon)	30
Spanish Airplay (PROMUSICAE)	1
US Hot Latin Songs (Billboard)	21
US Latin Pop Airplay (Billboard)	4

=== Certification ===
Country	Certification	Sales/shipments
Mexico (AMPROFON)	Gold	30,000
