= Rabiosa (song) =

2011 single by Shakira featuring El Cata or Pitbull

Single by Shakira featuring El Cata or Pitbull

from the album Sale el Sol
- Released: 8 April 2011
- Recorded: 2010
- Genre: Latin pop; merengue; EDM
- Length: 2:50
- Label: Epic
- Songwriters: Shakira; Armando Pérez; Edward Bello
- Producers: Shakira; Luis Fernando Ochoa; Josh Abraham; Oligee; El Cata; Jim Jonsin

Shakira singles chronology
"Sale el Sol" (2011)	"Rabiosa" (2011)	"Antes de las Seis" (2011)

El Cata singles chronology
"Loca" (2010)	"Rabiosa" (2011)	"Wanna be Yours" (2011)

Pitbull singles chronology
"Give Me Everything" (2011)	"Rabiosa" (2011)	"Boomerang" (2011)

Music videos
- "Rabiosa (Spanish)" on YouTube; "Rabiosa (English)" on YouTube

"Rabiosa" (English: "Rabid") is a song by Colombian singer-songwriter Shakira from her ninth studio album, Sale el Sol (2010). Written by Armando Pérez (Pitbull), Edward Bello (El Cata), and Shakira, the song is based on a previously-released version by El Cata. Epic Records released "Rabiosa" as the third single from Sale el Sol on 8 April 2011; two versions were released: the Spanish-language version featuring El Cata, and the English-language version featuring Pitbull. Musically combining merengue and dance, "Rabiosa" features suggestive lyrics about sexuality.

Upon its release, "Rabiosa" received generally favourable reviews from music critics, some of whom deemed it one of the strongest tracks on Sale el Sol. Commercially, the English version of the song became a worldwide success, peaking atop the record charts of Portugal and Spain, and reaching the top ten in ten additional countries. In the United States, it was successful on the Latin record charts and peaked at number eight on the Billboard Hot Latin Songs chart. "Rabiosa" was certified double-platinum in Mexico and platinum in Italy and Spain.

An accompanying music video for the song was directed by Jaume de Laiguana and features Shakira enjoying herself in an underground party; scenes of her pole dancing are interspersed throughout the video. Critics were positive towards the video, and many noted its similarity to the music video of Shakira's 2009 single "She Wolf". The video went viral on video-sharing website YouTube two days after its release and was later marked "Vevo Certified" by joint venture music video website Vevo for reaching more than 100 million views.

== Background and composition ==
"Rabiosa" (2011)
15 second sample of the English version of "Rabiosa". Shakira's "sultry" moans are heard throughout the song.

"Rabiosa" was written by artists Armando Pérez, better known by his stage name Pitbull, Edward Bello, and Shakira, for the singer's ninth studio album Sale el Sol (2010). The album marked the first time she worked with Bello, who is better known by his stage name El Cata, and their collaboration started after Shakira expressed her desire to experiment with merengue music, saying "I grew up listening to merengue— that was a big part of my life, and I was missing it". Merengue is a type of music and dance originating in the Dominican Republic, and after being referred to Bello by Pitbull, Shakira travelled to the country and began recording sessions with him in his "tiny" studio in Santo Domingo. Bello talked about his collaboration with Shakira, saying "If I was thinking that this little studio was going to be in the world’s vision at this time, I wouldn't believe it".

Two versions of the song are present on the album; the English-language version features verses from Pitbull, while the Spanish-language version features El Cata. "Rabiosa" was chosen to be the third single from the album by Epic Records, and Shakira's official website revealed the artwork for the single on 18 April 2011, the day it was sent to radio stations. Both versions were released for digital download on 8 April 2011. Worldwide, the English version was released as a CD single on 27 May 2011.

Primarily an uptempo latin pop track, "Rabiosa" additionally borrows influences from merengue and dance music. In the song, Shakira and Pitbull/El Cata trade verses regarding each other's sex appeal. English and Spanish words are mixed together in various lines, such as when Shakira sings "Oye papi, if you like it mocha / Come get a little closer and bite me en la boca". Jennifer Schaffer from The Stanford Daily described Shakira and Pitbull's vocals as "sultry" and "raspy," respectively.

== Critical reception ==
The song received generally favourable reviews from music critics. James Reed from The Boston Globe appreciated Shakira's "sly and vampy" vocals, and termed "Rabiosa" an "irresistible merengue hybrid". Michelle Morgante from Boston.com called the track a "new merengue-rock hybrid that lays down bare horn riffs over a driving beat in a groove that is irresistible". Jennifer Schaffer from The Stanford Daily deemed it one of the "best tracks on the album", praising its dance beats and calling it an "undeniably sexy song you’d expect from a Shakira/Pitbull collaboration". Allison Stewart from The Washington Post also recommended the track, labelling it "giddy, rapid-fire Latin pop". Likewise, Mikael Wood from Entertainment Weekly picked the song as a highlight from Sale el Sol. Carlos Macias from Terra USA, however, gave the song a negative review, writing it off as a "cheaper version of "Loca"" and criticising Pitbull's collaboration. In 2014, Emily Exton of VH1 placed the track on her list of Shakira's best duets, summarizing "It's been scientifically proven that Mr. 305 cannot not make a hit".

At the 2011 Los Premios 40 Principales awards ceremony, "Rabiosa" was nominated for "Mejor Canción Internacional en Español" ("Best International Song in Spanish"). At the 2012 American Society of Composers, Authors and Publishers (ASCAP) Awards ceremony, Bello won an award for his composition of the song. At the 27th Annual International Dance Music Awards, "Rabiosa" was nominated for "Best Latin/Reggaeton Track", but lost to Sak Noel's "Loca People". At the 2012 Latin Billboard Music Awards, "Rabiosa" was nominated for "Canción del Año, Digital" ("Digital Song of the Year"), but lost to Don Omar's "Danza Kuduro". At the 2012 Premio Lo Nuestro awards ceremony, "Rabiosa" was nominated for "Colaboración del Año" ("Collaboration of the Year") and "Canción Pop Del Año" ("Pop Song of the Year"), and won in the latter category.

== Chart performance ==
The English version of "Rabiosa" was a worldwide commercial success. In Austria, the song entered the Austrian Singles chart at number 36 and peaked at number six, spending a total of 17 weeks in the region. In both the Dutch-speaking Flanders and French-speaking Wallonia regions of Belgium, "Rabiosa" peaked at number five on the Ultratop charts, staying on the charts for a total of 16 and 19 weeks, respectively. In this region, it was certified gold by the Belgian Entertainment Association (BEA) for sales of 10,000 units. In France, "Rabiosa" entered the French Singles chart at number 94 and peaked at number six for two weeks, and spent a total of 33 weeks on the chart. In Italy, the song entered the Italian Singles chart at number nine and peaked at number six, spending a total of seven weeks inside the top 20 of the chart. In this region, "Rabiosa" was certified platinum by the Federazione Industria Musicale Italiana (FIMI) for sales of 60,000 units. In Mexico, the single was certified double-platinum by the Asociación Mexicana de Productores de Fonogramas y Videogramas (AMPROFON) for shipments of 120,000 units. In Spain, the song entered the Spanish Singles chart at number 23 and peaked at number one for a total of five weeks, and spent a total of 33 weeks on the chart. In this region, it was certified platinum by the Productores de Música de España (PROMUSICAE) for shipments of 40,000 units. In Switzerland, after initially charting at number 28 on the Swiss Singles chart, "Rabiosa" peaked at number three and spent a total of 21 weeks on the chart. In this region, the International Federation of the Phonographic Industry (IFPI) certified it gold for selling 10,000 units.

In the United States, "Rabiosa" was successful on the Latin record charts. It peaked at number eight on the US Billboard Hot Latin Songs chart, spending a total of 25 weeks on the chart. It also reached number eight on the Latin Pop Airplay chart, spending a total of 28 weeks on the chart. On the Tropical Songs chart, it peaked at number 13 and spend a total of 20 weeks on the chart.

== Music video ==
Near to the end of the video, Shakira does a split while holding on to a pole.

The accompanying music video for "Rabiosa" was directed by Jaume de Laiguana and was shot on 24 April 2011, in Barcelona. Laiguana had also directed the videos for the two previous single releases from the album, "Loca" and "Sale el Sol". The music video premiered on Shakira's official website on 7 June 2011, and the English-language version was made available for digital download on 8 June. The Spanish version was made available for digital download a day later. The video begins with Shakira walking into an underground party while sporting a brown bob haircut. Amidst "a party full of silly-string and confetti-flinging fun", she begins dancing and flirting with a man, and at one point lies in a bathtub full of colourful balls. Scenes of Shakira pole dancing while wearing a black string bra and knickers and sporting her normal long blonde hair are inter-cut throughout the video. The video ends with Shakira doing a split while holding onto the pole, and back inside the party she crowd surfs away. Pitbull appears in the English version video while El Cata does not appear in the Spanish version of the video.

Upon its release, the music video went viral on video-sharing website YouTube two days after its release and was the most-viewed video of that day, gaining almost four million views in less than 48 hours. Critical reception towards the video was favourable. Jeff Benjamin from Billboard commented that Shakira continues "the fantasies that she started in her "She Wolf" video" and praised Shakira's brunette hairstyle, concluding that "the Latin songstress brings the heat both musically and visually". Becky Bain from Idolator found Shakira's pole dancing sequence similar to the video of Britney Spears' 2007 single "Gimme More", but joked that it is "not terribly depressing and certainly not shot in about 15 minutes". Ann Lee from Metro also found the video similar to the one for "She Wolf" and commended Shakira's pole dancing ability, noting that she "ups the raunch factor" and "gets pulses racing". Sadao Turner from Ryan Seacrest.com praised Shakira's "phenomenal" figure. The video was marked "Vevo Certified" by joint venture music video website Vevo for reaching more than 100 million views on YouTube.

== Formats and track listing ==
- CD single (English version)
1. "Rabiosa" - 2:50
2. "Rabiosa" (C. Berg remix) - 3:57
- Digital download (English version)
1. "Rabiosa" - 2:50
- Digital download (Spanish version)
1. "Rabiosa" - 2:50
- Remixes EP (English version)
1. "Rabiosa" - 2:50
2. "Rabiosa" (C. Berg remix) - 3:57
3. "Rabiosa" (7th Heaven radio edit) - 3:34
4. "Rabiosa" (The Crew Remix) - 3:48
5. "Rabiosa" (Club Junkies Club remix) - 6:28

== Charts ==
=== Weekly charts ===
Weekly chart performance for "Rabiosa"
Chart (2011)	Peak position
Austria (Ö3 Austria Top 40)	6
Belgium (Ultratop 50 Flanders)	5
Belgium (Ultratop 50 Wallonia)	5
Canada Hot 100 (Billboard)	38
Canada CHR/Top 40 (Billboard)	49
Czech Republic Airplay (ČNS IFPI)	10
Denmark (Tracklisten)	9
France (SNEP)	6
Germany (GfK)	26
Hungary (Dance Top 40)	15
Hungary (Editors' Choice Top 40)	40
Israel International Airplay (Media Forest)	7
Italy (FIMI)	6
Mexico (Mexico Airplay)	4
Netherlands (Dutch Top 40 Tipparade)	8
Netherlands (Single Top 100)	46
Poland Airplay (ZPAV)	3
Poland Dance (ZPAV)	4
Portugal (Nielsen SoundScan)	1
Slovakia Airplay (ČNS IFPI)	14
Spain (Promusicae)	1
Sweden (Sverigetopplistan)	48
Switzerland (Schweizer Hitparade)	3
US Bubbling Under Hot 100 (Billboard)	10
US Hot Latin Songs (Billboard)	8
US Latin Pop Airplay (Billboard)	8
US Tropical Airplay (Billboard)	13

=== Year-end charts ===
Year-end chart performance for "Rabiosa"
Chart (2011)	Position
Belgium (Ultratop 50 Flanders)	38
Belgium (Ultratop 50 Wallonia)	36
Brazil (Crowley)	37
France (SNEP)	28
Italy (Musica e dischi)	36
Spain (PROMUSICAE)	4
Switzerland (Schweizer Hitparade)	45
Ukraine Airplay (TopHit)	143
US Hot Latin Songs (Billboard)	27

Chart (2012)	Position
Brazil (Crowley)	52

== Certifications ==
Region	Certification	Certified units/sales
Belgium (BRMA)	Gold	15,000^{*}
Brazil (Pro-Música Brasil) English Version	2× Platinum	120,000^{‡}
Brazil (Pro-Música Brasil) Spanish Version	Gold	30,000^{‡}
Italy (FIMI)	Platinum	30,000^{*}
Mexico (AMPROFON) English version	3× Platinum+Gold	210,000^{‡}
Mexico (AMPROFON) Spanish version	3× Platinum	180,000^{*}
Spain (Promusicae) English version	Gold	30,000^{‡}
Spain (Promusicae)	Platinum	40,000
Switzerland (IFPI Switzerland)	Gold	15,000^{^}
^{*} Sales figures based on certification alone.^{^} Shipments figures based on certification alone.^{‡} Sales+streaming figures based on certification alone.

== See also ==
- List of number-one singles of 2011 (Spain)
