= Loca (Shakira song) =

2010 single by Shakira

Single by Shakira featuring El Cata or Dizzee Rascal

from the album Sale el Sol
- Released: 10 September 2010
- Recorded: 2010
- Genre: Merengue; Latin pop
- Length: 3:05 (Spanish version); 3:13 (English version)
- Label: Epic
- Songwriters: Shakira; Edward Bello; Armando Pérez; Dylan Mills (English version only)
- Producer: Shakira

Shakira singles chronology
"Waka Waka (This Time for Africa)" (2010)	"Loca" (2010)	"Sale el Sol" (2011)

Dizzee Rascal singles chronology
"Shout" (2010)	"Loca" (2010)	"The Power" (2012)

El Cata singles chronology
"Watagatapitusberry" (2010)	"Loca" (2010)	"Rabiosa" (2011)

Music videos
- "Loca (English)" on YouTube; "Loca (Spanish)" on YouTube

"Loca" (English: "Crazy") is a song by Colombian singer-songwriter Shakira and the lead single from her ninth studio album, Sale el Sol (2010). It was based on a previously-released version by Dominican rapper El Cata, and two versions were released. Written by Shakira, El Cata, and Pitbull, the Spanish-language version featuring El Cata was released on 10 September 2010. The English-language version, additionally written by and featuring British rapper Dizzee Rascal, was released on 13 September 2010. A Latin pop and merengue track, "Loca" describes Shakira's eccentric infatuation with a man.

"Loca" received generally favorable reviews from music critics, who particularly commended the merengue sound. The English version peaked within top five of the record charts of many countries including Austria, Belgium, France, Hungary, and Italy, while Spanish version reached number one in Spain and Switzerland as well as on the Billboard Hot Latin Songs, Latin Pop Airplay, and Tropical Songs charts. "Loca" has been certified diamond in Colombia and multi-platinum in Italy, Mexico, and Spain. In August 2014, Dominican songwriter Ramon "Arias" Vasquez sued Shakira for plagiarizing his mid-1990s song "Loca con su Tiguere". The case was dismissed in August 2015 after it was found that Vasquez had fabricated the evidence he had presented in court.

Its accompanying music video was filmed in Barcelona, Spain in August 2010, and was released the following month. It features Shakira interacting with a beach crowd, and dancing in front of the sea wearing a golden bikini. It generated a favorable response from critics, many of whom praised its concept for matching the vibe of the song. Shakira has performed "Loca" on several television shows and on three of her world tours: The Sun Comes Out World Tour (2010), El Dorado World Tour (2018), and Las Mujeres Ya No Lloran World Tour (2025).

== Background and composition ==
Shakira "Loca" (2010)
A 17 second sample of the English version of "Loca", which draws heavy inspiration from merengue music.

"Loca" was written by American rapper Armando Pérez, better known by his stage name Pitbull, Dominican rapper Edward Bello, and Shakira, for the singer's ninth studio album Sale el Sol (2010). The album marked the first time she worked with Bello, who is better known by his stage name El Cata, and their collaboration started after Shakira expressed her desire to experiment with merengue music, saying "I grew up listening to merengue— that was a big part of my life, and I was missing it". Merengue is a type of music and dance originating in the Dominican Republic, and after being referred to Bello by Pitbull, Shakira travelled to the country and began recording sessions with him in his "tiny" studio in Santo Domingo. Bello talked about his collaboration with Shakira, saying "If I was thinking that this little studio was going to be in the world’s vision at this time, I wouldn't believe it". "Loca" is a Latin-pop song composed of horn-laden merengue beats combined with techno dance percussion beats. Lyrically, the song is about Shakira expressing her erratic and obsessive behaviour towards her lover, more so than his other leading lady, prominently heard in the lines "She'd die for your love / But your love's only mine, boy" and "I'm crazy but you like it".

Two versions of the song are present on the album; the English-language version features vocals from English rapper Dizzee Rascal (who also wrote the lyrics of his parts), while the Spanish-language version features El Cata. Speaking about the collaboration, Dizzee Rascal said that "I know it sounds a bit mad now, but you'll see it and see what's going on". He further said "It's me doing something different man, on a merengue tip." In an interview with Billboard, Dizzee Rascal said about Shakira that, "she's a bit of a trendsetter -- she does loads of different things on a major scale" and added "You'd expect her to use an American rapper [for the song], but she chose me. It meant a lot." He then commented about the song that, "I'd like to be in that Spanish market. I got into the whole reggaeton thing when it came out, so I always wanted to get around to something like that". "Loca" served as the lead single from Sale el Sol. The Spanish version of the song, featuring El Cata, was released on 10 September 2010. The English version, featuring Dizzee Rascal, debuted later on 13 September 2010.

=== Plagiarism case ===
On 19 August 2014, Alvin Hellerstein, senior judge of the U.S. District Court for the Southern District of New York, concluded that the Spanish version of "Loca" had been indirectly plagiarized from "Loca con su Tiguere", a mid-1990s song composed by Dominican songwriter Ramon "Arias" Vasquez. He testified that he had met Bello in 2006 and had introduced him to two of his songs, including "Loca con su Tiguere". According to Vasquez, Bello was impressed by the song and asked him to record it. However, Bello claimed that the song was originally his and was based on his relationship with his ex-wife as opposed to Vasquez's claim that "Loca con su Tiguere" was based on his sister's relationship with a street-tough boyfriend. Hellerstein ruled in favour of Vasquez and found the two songs to be similar in structure and rhythm. As the Spanish version of "Loca" features Bello singing numerous portions, the judge reasoned that it too was plagiarized from Vasquez's song. After a trial phase, SonyATV Latin and Sony/ATV Discos (the distributors of the Spanish version of "Loca" in the United States) will pay damages to Mayimba Music, the owner of the rights to Vasquez's song and the plaintiff in the lawsuit.

On 10 August 2015, the case was dismissed by Hellerstein after Sony Music brought forth new evidence suggesting that Vasquez had fabricated the cassette tape that he had earlier produced in court to prove that the song was originally recorded by him. Hellerstein said the evidence given by Sony Music provided "competent and substantial proof" that the cassette tape was fake.

== Critical reception ==
Upon its release, "Loca" received generally favourable reviews from music critics. A reviewer from Billboard complimented Shakira for displaying her unpredictable musical choices by having Dizzee Rascal sing over a merengue beat, which they termed as a "jarring combination". Robert Copsey from Digital Spy also reviewed the song positively, and labelled the song "bizarre yet thoroughly enjoyable". Jennifer Schaffer from Stanford Daily marked Dizzee Rascal's rap as the highlight of the song. James Reed from The Boston Globe termed it as an "irresistible merengue hybrid" and deemed the Spanish version of the song as an album essential. Michelle Morgante, again from The Boston Globe, was impressed by the song's effectiveness in both its Spanish and English version, which she commented is "lost in some of Shakira's other attempts at language switching". Allison Stewart from The Washington Post, however, claimed that there was "little appreciable difference" between the two versions of the song.

The Spanish version of the song was nominated for "Top Latin Song" at the 2011 Billboard Music Awards. Two other songs by Shakira, "Gypsy" and "Waka Waka (This Time for Africa)", were also nominated, and the award was won by the latter song. In the same year, at the Latin Billboard Music Awards, the Spanish version was nominated for "Hot Latin Song of the Year, Vocal Event" and "Latin Digital Download of the Year", but lost both. At the 2011 Premios 40 Principales awards ceremony, the Spanish version of the song was nominated for "Mejor Canción Internacional en Español" ("Best International Song in Spanish"). The Spanish version of the song was nominated for "La Más Pegajosa" ("Catchiest Tune") and "Mi Ringtone" ("My Ringtone") at the 2011 Premios Juventud awards, but lost both categories to American rapper Pitbull's song "Bon, Bon". The English version of the song received a nomination in the category of "Best Latin/Reggaeton Track" at the 26th Annual International Dance Music Awards in 2011.

== Commercial performance ==
The English version of "Loca" became a worldwide commercial success. After debuting at number 17 on the Austrian Singles Chart, it peaked at number two and spent a total of 20 weeks on the chart. In this region, it was certified gold by the International Federation of the Phonographic Industry (IFPI) for selling 15,000 units. In the French-speaking Wallonia region of Belgium, the song peaked atop the Ultratop chart for two weeks, and spent a total of 26 weeks in the region. It was Shakira's fourth single to reach number one in the country. The Belgian Entertainment Association (BEA) certified it gold for sales of 10,000 units. "Loca" also reached number one on the Czech Airplay Chart for a total of seven consecutive weeks. In France, the song entered the singles chart at number four and peaked at number two, spending a total of 49 weeks in the region, becoming Shakira's seventh top ten there. However, it managed to reach number one on the French digital songs chart. It was the eighth best-selling single in 2010 in France, with sales of 143,337 units. "Loca" peaked at number four on both the Hungarian Singles and Dance charts. The song entered the top 20 of the Italian Singles Chart at number one, becoming Shakira's first single since "Beautiful Liar" to accomplish the feat, and stayed atop the chart for six weeks. In this region, it was certified double-platinum by the Federazione Industria Musicale Italiana (FIMI) for selling 60,000 units. In the United States, "Loca" peaked at number 32 on the Billboard Hot 100 chart. On the Hot Dance Club Songs chart, it became Shakira's first single since "Did It Again" to peak at number one.

The Spanish version of "Loca" peaked at number two on the Monitor Latino chart in Mexico, and was certified double-platinum by the Asociación Mexicana de Productores de Fonogramas y Videogramas (AMPROFON) for selling 120,000 units. It entered the Spanish Singles Chart at number 10 and peaked at number one for 12 weeks. It stayed on the chart for a total of 47 weeks, and was certified double-platinum by the Productores de Música de España (PROMUSICAE) for sales of 80,000 units. The song entered the Swiss Singles Chart at number two and peaked at number one for four weeks; it spent a total of 40 weeks on the chart. In this region, IFPI certified "Loca" platinum for selling 30,000 units. The Spanish version became a huge hit on the Latin record charts in the United States. It reached number one on the Billboard Hot Latin Songs, and also peaked atop the Latin Pop Airplay and Tropical Songs chart. "Loca" was Shakira's eighteenth top 10 single on the Hot Latin Songs chart, making her the third-ranking female artist with the highest number of top 10 singles on the chart, behind Gloria Estefan and Ana Gabriel.

== Music video ==
Barcelona local authorities fined Shakira after they saw video footage of her dancing in the Pla de Palau fountain (pictured) without permits.

The music video was filmed in the Barcelonian district of La Barceloneta on 19 August 2010, and was directed by Jaume de Laiguana, who had previously worked with Shakira on the videos for the songs "No" and "Gypsy". The music video was shot in "guerrilla-style", utilizing hand-held cameras to shoot many of the scenes. Shakira talked about the video, saying "I decided to just do something more spontaneous, and be myself and be free and feel free about it because that is what this song is about". The music video was released on 29 September 2010, and the Spanish and English versions of the video were individually released on iTunes on 11 October 2010, and 13 October 2010, respectively.

The video starts with Shakira roller-skating with many fans surrounding her. After roaming about the city, including numerous scenes of dancing, she publicly changes her wardrobe and hitches a ride on a motorbike. Further on, she dances and jumps into a fountain. During the next verse, she is seen belly dancing with Rascal by the beach and, near the end of the video, she dives into the sea along with many fans and celebrates. Scenes of Shakira dancing wearing a gold triangle bikini and gold sequined pants are also interspersed throughout the video. Dizzee Rascal also makes an appearance during his part of the song.

Walter Frazier from Billboard reviewed the video positively, and appreciated Shakira's craziness in the video. James Montgomery from MTV gave the video a very positive review, calling it a "rare video" which perfectly complimented the nature of the song. The music video was nominated for "Best Short Form Music Video" at the 12th Latin Grammy Awards in 2011, but lost to the video of Calle 13's "Calma Pueblo". At the 2011 Premios Nuestra Tierra award ceremony, the music video won the award for "Mejor Video Musical Para Artista Colombiano" ("Best Music Video for Colombian Artist"). It was nominated at the 2011 Premios Juventud for Mi Video Favorito (My Favorite Video). Having received 100 million views on YouTube, the music video was given a VEVOCertified Award.

== Live performances ==
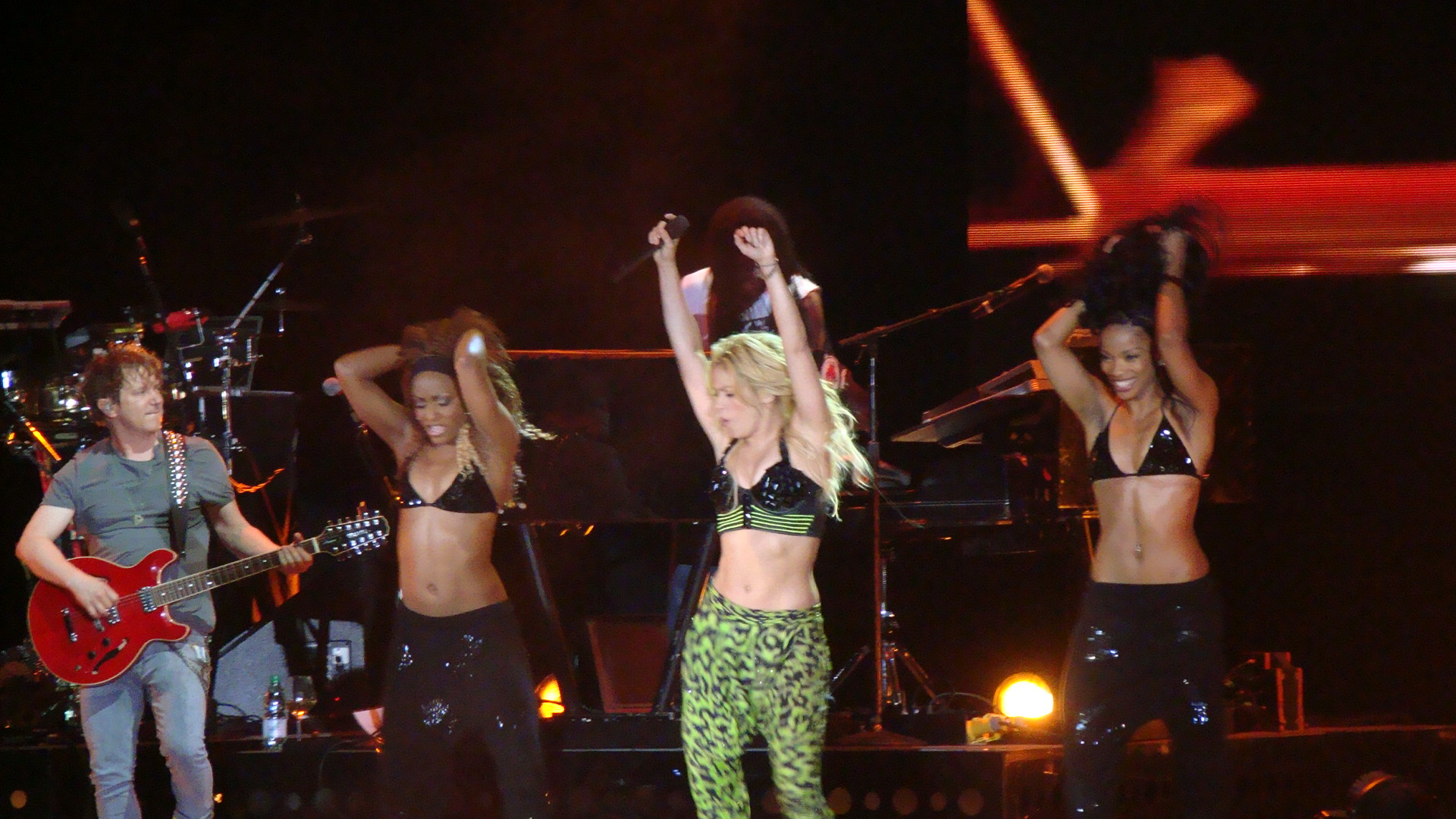
Shakira performing "Loca" in Punta del Este, during The Sun Comes Out World Tour.

Shakira performed the English version of "Loca" first on 23 September 2010 on the Late Show with David Letterman. Shakira appeared on Lopez Tonight to talk about "Loca" and taught host George Lopez the dance steps of the song. She performed it on Dancing with the Stars on 19 October – the release date of the album. Shakira also performed the song on November 9 at the finale of the German version of the X-Factor.

Shakira performed the song with Dizzee Rascal together for the first time on the MTV Europe Music Awards 2010 on 7 November. Gabi Gregg from MTV chose the performance as the best on the show, praising Shakira's dance moves and noting that "she actually sounds the same live as she does recorded". Jillian Mapes from Billboard included the performance on her list of "5 Must-See Moments at the 2010 MTV European Music Awards". Shakira performed the Spanish version of the song live during the 12th Latin Grammy awards ceremony. The song was included on the setlist of The Sun Comes Out World Tour in 2010 and 2011. During the performances, Shakira wore a pair of neon leopard-print pants and performed a dance routine with "intricate and urban choreographies". On 25 October 2010, Shakira was leaving the Honda Centre parking lot in California after a concert, but got out of her limo and performed "Loca" with two dancers on top of a car.

== Formats and track listings ==
Digital download (English version)

1. "Loca" (featuring Dizzee Rascal) – 3:11

Digital download (Spanish version)

1. "Loca" (featuring El Cata) – 3:04

CD single

1. "Loca" (featuring Dizzee Rascal) – 3:11
2. "Loca" (featuring Dizzee Rascal) (Gucci Vump aka Brodinski & The Shoes Discothèque Remix) – 4:07

Digital EP

1. "Loca" (featuring Dizzee Rascal) (JS Mix) – 3:13
2. "Loca" (featuring Dizzee Rascal) (Sticky Drums Remix By Gucci Vump Aka Brodinski and the Shoes) – 3:14
3. "Loca" (featuring Dizzee Rascal) (Freemasons Radio Edit) – 3:01
4. "Loca" (featuring Dizzee Rascal) (Music Video) – 3:24

== Charts ==
=== Weekly charts ===
Chart performance for "Loca" (featuring Dizzee Rascal)
Chart (2010–2011)	Peak position
Austria (Ö3 Austria Top 40)	2
Belgium (Ultratop 50 Flanders)	3
Belgium (Ultratop 50 Wallonia)	1
Canada Hot 100 (Billboard)	36
CIS Airplay (TopHit)	13
CIS Airplay (TopHit) Freemasons Radio Edit	51
Czech Republic Airplay (ČNS IFPI)	1
Denmark (Tracklisten)	12
Finland (Suomen virallinen lista)	11
France (SNEP)	2
Germany (GfK)	6
Global Dance Tracks (Billboard)	8
Greece (Greek Airplay)	1
Hungary (Rádiós Top 40)	17
Hungary (Single Top 40)	4
Hungary (Dance Top 40)	4
Italy (FIMI)	1
Japan (Japan Hot 100)	58
Netherlands (Single Top 100)	55
Poland Airplay (ZPAV)	1
Poland (Video Chart)	1
Romania (Romanian Top 100)	1
Romania TV Airplay (Media Forest)	1
Russia Airplay (TopHit)	16
Slovakia Airplay (ČNS IFPI)	2
South Korea (Circle Chart)	51
Spain (Promusicae)	1
Sweden (Sverigetopplistan)	20
Ukraine Airplay (TopHit)	34
US Billboard Hot 100	32
US Dance Club Songs (Billboard)	1

Chart performance for "Loca" (featuring El Cata)
Chart (2010–2011)	Peak position
Mexico (Mexico Airplay)	2
Peru (UNIMPRO)	8
Spain (Promusicae)	1
Switzerland (Schweizer Hitparade)	1
US Hot Latin Songs (Billboard)	1
US Latin Pop Airplay (Billboard)	1
US Tropical Airplay (Billboard)	1

=== Year-end charts ===
Annual chart rankings for "Loca"
Chart (2010)	Position
Austrian Singles Chart	38
Belgian Flanders Singles Chart	45
Belgian Walloon Singles Chart	26
Brazil (Crowley)	75
French Singles Chart	8
French Download Chart	5
Germany (Official German Charts)	63
Hungary (Dance Top 40)	50
Italy (FIMI)	10
Italy Airplay (EarOne)	74
Spanish Singles Chart	7
Swedish Singles Chart	70
Swiss Singles Chart	16
US Latin Songs (Billboard)	53

Chart (2011)	Position
Belgian Walloon Singles Chart	40
Brazil (Crowley)	16
French Singles Chart	28
Greek Airplay Chart	42
Hungarian Airplay Chart	81
Italy (Musica e dischi)	71
Romania (Romanian Top 100)	14
Russia Airplay (TopHit)	63
Spanish Singles Chart	10
Swiss Singles Chart	46
Ukraine Airplay (TopHit)	111
US Hot Dance Club Songs (Billboard)	44

Chart (2022)	Position
Hungary (Rádiós Top 40)	95

== Certifications and sales ==
Certifications and sales for "Loca"
Region	Certification	Certified units/sales
Argentina (CAPIF)	Gold	20,000^{^}
Austria (IFPI Austria)	Gold	15,000^{*}
Belgium (BRMA)	Gold	15,000^{*}
Brazil (Pro-Música Brasil) English Version	2× Platinum	120,000^{‡}
Brazil (Pro-Música Brasil) Spanish Version	Platinum	60,000^{‡}
Canada (Music Canada)	Platinum	80,000^{‡}
Colombia	Diamond	
Denmark (IFPI Danmark)	Gold	15,000^{^}
France (SNEP)	Platinum	143,337
Germany (BVMI)	Gold	150,000^{^}
Italy (FIMI)	2× Platinum	60,000^{*}
Mexico (AMPROFON)	Diamond+2× Platinum	420,000^{‡}
Spain (Promusicae) English Version	Gold	30,000^{‡}
Spain (Promusicae) Spanish Version	2× Platinum	80,000^{*}
Sweden (GLF)	Gold	20,000^{‡}
Switzerland (IFPI Switzerland)	Platinum	30,000^{^}
United States Digital downloads only	—	255,000
Venezuela	Platinum	
^{*} Sales figures based on certification alone.^{^} Shipments figures based on certification alone.^{‡} Sales+streaming figures based on certification alone.

== Release history ==
Release history and formats for "Loca"
Region	Date	Format	Label
Austria	10 September 2010	Digital download	Epic
Belgium	10 September 2010	Digital download	Epic
Denmark	10 September 2010	Digital download	Epic
Finland	10 September 2010	Digital download	Epic
Italy	10 September 2010	Digital download	Epic
Netherlands	10 September 2010	Digital download	Epic
Norway	10 September 2010	Digital download	Epic
Portugal	10 September 2010	Digital download	Epic
Spain	10 September 2010	Digital download	Epic
Sweden	10 September 2010	Digital download	Epic
Switzerland	10 September 2010	Digital download	Epic
United States	10 September 2010	Digital download	Epic
Canada	4 October 2010	Digital download	Epic
United States	12 October 2010	Airplay	Epic
Germany	5 November 2010	CD single	Epic
France	1 December 2010	CD single	Epic

== See also ==
- List of best-selling Latin singles
- List of number-one pop hits of 2011 (Brazil)
- Ultratop 40 number-one hits of 2010
- List of number-one hits of 2010 (France)
- List of number-one hits of 2010 (Italy)
- List of number-one hits of 2010 (Switzerland)
- List of number-one singles of 2010 (Spain)
- List of number-one Billboard Top Latin Songs of 2010
- List of number-one Billboard Hot Latin Pop Airplay of 2010
- List of number-one Billboard Hot Tropical Songs of 2010
- List of number-one dance singles of 2010 (U.S.)
- List of Polish Dance Chart number-one singles of 2010
- List of Romanian Top 100 number ones of the 2010s
