= Cairo 360 =

- Cairo360.com's Logo

- Screenshot Screenshot of Cairo 360's portal
- Website type: Online Magazine
- Available in: English and Arabic
- Owner: Media Republic
- Creator: Waseem El Tanahi
- Editor: Haisam Awad
- Website: www.cairo360.com
- Commercial: Yes
- Launched: 28 March 2010; 16 years ago
- Current status: Online

Cairo 360 is an online lifestyle publication and guide based in Cairo, Egypt. Founded in 2010 by Waseem El Tanahi, Managing Director of parent company Media Republic, the site posts daily reviews, feature articles, weekly events, cinema listings, and a venue directory. The website has been credited as the first website in Egypt to render the service of providing detailed information on living in Cairo.

== History ==
Launched in March 2010 under ownership of advertising and digital media company, Media Republic, Cairo 360 was conceived with the purpose of providing natives and visitors of Cairo, Egypt a comprehensive and objective directory on establishments ranging from restaurants and bars to beauty salons and exhibitions.

In 2013, the website expanded and re-launched to include revamped web design, several technical improvements, and various features and functions, including a lighter mobile version.

== Main features ==
Cairo 360 gained recognition in Egypt owing to its reviews, which cover topics that range from entertainment and shopping to restaurants and exhibitions. In addition, it provides an online booking service for tickets to its listed events and a cinema times section for movies currently showing in theaters. Other features include interviews and weekend guides.

== Awareness campaigns ==
In April 2010, Cairo 360 commissioned ten taxis branded with the website's logo to wait outside of Cairo's hotspots and provide free trips to anywhere within the city in order to raise awareness of the dangers of drunk driving.

== Reception and awards ==
In 2010, Cairo 360 received an Egypt Web Academy Award in the category of Press and Media. Following the award, local newspapers and magazines began to take notice with Daily News Egypt commissioning reviews and articles from the website.

== Sister sites ==
Once a private blog operated by an anonymous AUC alumni, Cairo Gossip found popularity amongst Cairo's youth as a means to information on the city's nightlife and local news. It was acquired by Media Republic in 2013 and has since re-launched to include new features.
