= Good Stuff (Shakira song) =

2010 promotional single by Shakira

Promotional single by Shakira

from the album She Wolf
- Released: 2010
- Recorded: 2009
- Studio: Compass Point Studios (Nassau, Bahamas); La Marimonda (Nassau, Bahamas); Rodeo Recording (New York, NY)
- Genre: Pop, dancehall
- Length: 3:17
- Label: Epic
- Songwriters: Pharrell Williams; Shakira
- Producers: Shakira; The Neptunes

Shakira promotional singles chronology
"Despedida" (2007)	"Good Stuff" (2010)	"Blanca Mujer" (2013)

"Good Stuff" is a song by Colombian singer-songwriter Shakira, taken from her eighth studio album, She Wolf (2009). The song was released as a promotional single as a part of a collaborative advertisement campaign between Shakira and SEAT, a Spanish car manufacturer. Despite not being promoted as a full single, the song charted on the Spanish singles chart.

== Background and release ==
"Good Stuff" was written by Shakira and Pharrell Williams, and is one of the four tracks on the album Shakira co-produced with The Neptunes, the others being "Did It Again", "Long Time" and "Why Wait". Shakira commented that they made the four songs in "five days", reflecting that Pharrell is "very fast and immediate in the studio" while she herself is "a little slower", and noted that she "learned a lot from his method". Musically, "Good Stuff" is pop and dancehall. Its production consists of hybrid world rhythms with a changing tempo, has some electronic influences, and features prominent xylophone instrumental on the chorus.

In 2010, the song "Good Stuff" was featured on an advertisement campaign and commercials by SEAT, the official sponsor of Shakira's 2010 European tour. The campaign featured a commercial with digital animations and Shakira performing parts of "Good Stuff". The commercial, debuted in March 2010, featured a launch of new limited special edition cars of their Ibiza and León series, billed as "SEAT Ibiza Good Stuff" and the "SEAT León Good Stuff", both named after the Shakira song. The campaign also celebrated Shakira's Barefoot Foundation, which helps poor and impoverished children and funds schools in Colombia. As a part of the launch, the song was made available as a free download on SEAT's Facebook page for the campaign. In December 2010, the commercial was awarded as the "Best Advertisement 2011" by the Hachette Group, praising its "creativity, image quality and set of shots". Following the advertisement campaign's launch, "Good Stuff" charted at 49 on the Spanish singles chart.

A remix of "Good Stuff" featuring Lebanese singer Ragheb Alama was featured on his 2010 compilation album Starz Vol. 1, and on his 2014 album Habib Dehkati, as well as on a deluxe version of Shakira's She Wolf album.

== Reception ==
Overall, critics rated "Good Stuff" positively, praising the song for its musical surprises, catchy chorus, unique sound, and fusion of different musical styles. In an album review, Judy Rosen from Rolling Stone characterized "Good Stuff" as "a string of musical surprises", all the way from its "dancehall-style rap-singing to a ridiculously catchy chorus." Lahmeik Stacey from Yahoo! Voices reflected on the song sounding "like three completely different songs", describing it as "nearly inexplicable" and "unique", and a "crazy creation". Ayala Ben-Yehuda from Reuters portrayed the song as "a synthed-out snake-charmer" which is "punctuated by ululating and staccato beats". Brian White from why so blu? assessed the song being "one sexual moan after another", noting that it has "a very synthesized slight Middle Eastern sound with a hint of Mexican and a dash of Mediterranean", while having "beautifully formulated" "xylophone Caribbean choruses" and an "ever changing tempo structure" that "keeps you hanging on wanting more". The Washington Post Express noted that the song "borrows some Indian and Brazilian rhythms to help Shakira deliver her rapid-fire lyrics". Sal Cinquemani from Slant Magazine stated that the song is "filled with a hybrid of dancehall and Latin-pop rhythms". James Montgomery from MTV described the song as "electronic genie music that transforms into "La Isla Bonita" in the chorus". Alex Young from Consequence critiqued the song, stating that it is a "derivative" of Shakira's own work. Evan Sawdey from PopMatters saw the song coming "so dangerously close to sounding like a Cora Corman song that it almost borders on parody" outlining that "the xylophones on the chorus sound like they were ripped directly from Toto's 'Africa'". Johnny Davis from The Guardian commented on the song's chorus being "assertive".

== Charts ==
Weekly chart performance for "Good Stuff"
Chart (2010)	Peak position
Spain (Promusicae)	49
