= She Wolf (album) =

2009 studio album by Shakira

- Standard cover

Studio album by Shakira
- Released: 9 October 2009
- Recorded: 2008–2009
- Studios: Compass Point Studios, The Bahamas
- Genres: Electropop; new wave; electro-disco
- Length: 40:50
- Languages: English; Spanish
- Label: Epic
- Producer: Shakira

Shakira chronology
Oral Fixation Tour (2007)	She Wolf (2009)	Sale el Sol (2010)

Singles from She Wolf
- 1. "She Wolf" Released: 10 July 2009; 2. "Did It Again" Released: 16 October 2009; 3. "Give It Up to Me" Released: 26 October 2009; 4. "Gypsy" Released: 26 March 2010

She Wolf (Spanish: Loba) is the eighth studio album and third English-language album by Colombian singer-songwriter Shakira. It was released on 9 October 2009, by Epic Records. As executive producers, Shakira and Amanda Ghost enlisted collaborators including The Neptunes, John Hill, Wyclef Jean, Lukas Burton, Future Cut, Jerry Duplessis and Timbaland. Musically, the record shifts from her traditional Latin pop and pop rock musical styles, instead exploring electropop, with influences of folk and world music. The lyrical themes of the album mostly focus on love and relationships and were based on the conversations Shakira had with her female friends.

She Wolf reached number one on the charts of Argentina, Ireland, Italy, Mexico and Switzerland. It also charted inside the top five in Spain, Germany and the United Kingdom. It debuted at number fifteen on the Billboard 200. She Wolf was certified double platinum in Colombia and Mexico, platinum in Brazil, Italy and Spain, and gold in numerous countries including France and the United Kingdom. It has sold over two million copies worldwide since its release.

The album was supported by four singles. Its lead single, "She Wolf", along with its Spanish-language version "Loba", reached the top ten in several countries. "Did It Again" (along with its Spanish-language version "Lo Hecho Está Hecho") was released worldwide as the second single, except in the United States, where its release was substituted by "Give It Up to Me". The fourth single was "Gypsy", along with its Spanish-language version "Gitana". Shakira embarked on The Sun Comes Out World Tour in late 2010 to promote both She Wolf and her next record Sale el Sol.

== Background and production ==
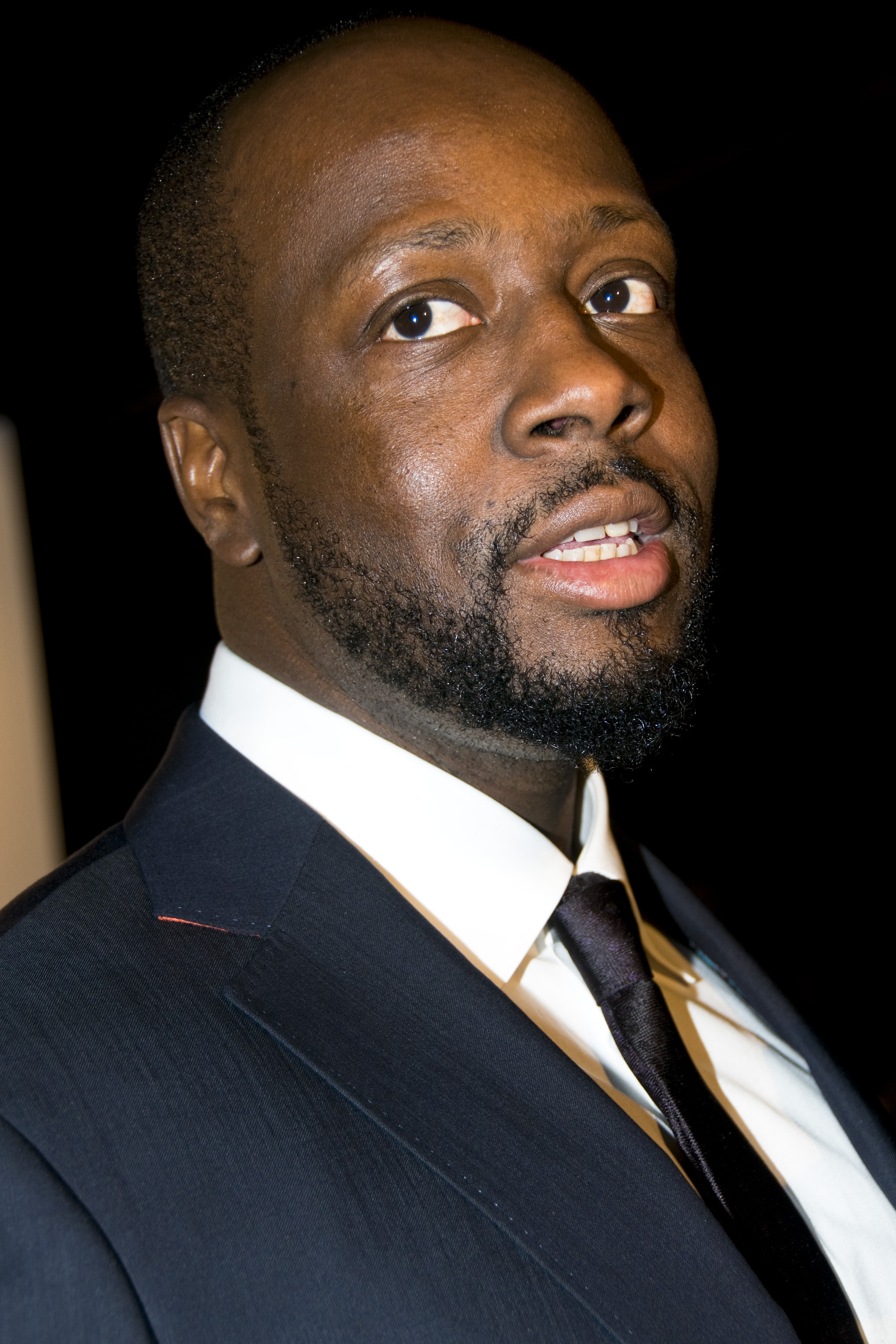
Having previously collaborated with Shakira on "Hips Don't Lie", Wyclef Jean (pictured) was featured on the song "Spy" in She Wolf.

In 2005, Shakira attained international success with the release of her sixth and seventh studio albums Fijación Oral Vol. 1 and Oral Fixation Vol. 2, which spawned the highly successful singles "La Tortura" and "Hips Don't Lie", respectively. To promote both the albums, she embarked on the Oral Fixation Tour, which reportedly grossed more than US$100 million worldwide. In 2008, Shakira signed a 10-year deal with international touring company Live Nation, which prompted Forbes to deem her the fourth highest earning female musician in history.

Soon, Shakira began work on her next studio album, titled She Wolf, which was, among other places, recorded at the Compass Point Studios in the Bahamas. In an interview with Rolling Stone, Shakira said that she specifically chose the studio after learning that it had previously been used for recording sessions by artists like Bob Marley, The Cure, and AC/DC, of whom she is a fan. Unlike most of her previous projects, which are predominantly composed of Latin and pop rock styles, She Wolf is an electropop album with world music influences. When asked why the album had electronic influences, Shakira responded, "I felt very curious and intrigued about the electro-pop world and everything it has to offer. I wanted to make sure that this album was very bassy and that the kicks hit really hard, and I wanted to concentrate on the beat. But my music, to a certain extent, is very complex – because I always try to experiment with sounds from other parts of the world." Explaining the meaning behind the title, Shakira said that "'She Wolf' is the woman of our time. The woman who knows what she wants and is free of prejudice and preconceived notions. She defends her deepest desires with teeth and claws like a wild animal".

Shakira and Amanda Ghost, the executive producers of the album, enlisted a diverse group of producers to collaborate on the tracks, such as Pharrell Williams, one half of the record production duo The Neptunes, who co-wrote four of the tracks on the album with Shakira. Other collaborators included John Hill, Sam Endicott, and Timbaland. Shakira later said that her collaboration with Williams helped her learn a lot, noting "When collaborating you always try and capture something from the other person and I learnt a lot from his method". The singer revealed that the two readied four tracks in five days, and commented that "What was interesting is that he's very fast and immediate in the studio and I'm a little slower". Endicott, musician and lead singer of American post-punk band The Bravery, was personally called by Shakira to co-compose the title track of the album along with Hill. He explained how they both began working with the single, saying she "contacted him [Hill], asking if he had any stuff. We never had her in mind. We just made the thing independently of her, and then she liked it a lot, and she sang over it. She used some of the melodies we put in there and then wrote these crazy lyrics about being a werewolf. And that's how it happened". Haitian-American rapper Wyclef Jean, who previously appeared as a featured artist on "Hips Don't Lie" with Shakira, talked about his chemistry with her, saying "I have a natural chemistry with Shakira. I love the Latin vibe. The Lebanese vibe. I love the multicultural aspect of the CD. These days it's hard for you to pick up a CD and love it from beginning to end. Shakira represents that 360 degrees of: You put it in, and the whole CD rocks". In She Wolf, Jean appears as a featured artist on the track "Spy".

== Musical styles and lyrics ==
My biggest motivation was to make an album that people could just have fun with, and forget about their troubles. Dance-oriented. Club-oriented. I want people to have fun with it. Forget about the troubles. Forget about the crisis. Forget everything for a minute- at least while they listen to the music.

— Shakira, on her motivation behind the record, MTV News

She Wolf is primarily an electropop album that combines influences from the musical styles of various countries and regions, like Africa, Colombia, India, and the Middle East. Shakira termed the album a "sonic experimental trip", and said that she researched folk music from different countries in order to "combine electronics with world sounds, tambourines, clarinets, Indian classical music, dancehall, etc." The title track is an example of the electronic music styled production of the album, and is composed of 70s disco guitars and "heaps of robot effects". "Did It Again" is a midtempo electropop song that contains elements of samba. World music influences surface on songs like "Why Wait" and "Gypsy", the former is a heavy synth based electro-funk song with Led Zeppelin-inspired Middle Eastern strings, while the latter is included as the "closest thing to an acoustic song on the album" and features instrumentation from mandolin, banjo, sitar and tabla. Tracks like "Long Time" and "Good Stuff" display dancehall, electronica and Latin elements. Critics found the 1980s-stylised dance-pop and electropop track "Men in This Town" similar to the work of American band No Doubt and a highlight on the record. The Wyclef Jean collaboration "Spy" is a bouncy disco and R&B song that is described as sultry and playful. Elements of rock music are also present on the album, mostly evident on the "noisy" stadium rock song "Mon Amour". The US bonus track "Give It Up to Me" mixes pop and hip hop music with a playful rap by Lil Wayne. As Shakira wanted to make sure the "kicks hit really hard", the tracks on She Wolf were made "very bass-driven". She revealed that she had no idea how the album would sound like at the end, describing it to be like "standing in front of a white canvas", but admitted that she knew she wanted to make an electronica influenced album from the beginning.

Shakira "She Wolf" (2009)
An 18 second sample of the chorus of seventies-disco inspired lead single "She Wolf", a primary example of the electronic styled production of the album.

The lyrics of the tracks on She Wolf, according to Shakira, have been written from a "very feminine perspective". She attributed this to her growing maturity, noting "I think maybe because I feel more like a woman today". Many of the songs focus on "emotions that a woman experiments when you're in love or out of love — jealousy, fantasies, daydreams", which the singer said were based on her conversations with girlfriends who are "struggling with their own romantic lives". This issue is prominently covered in the track "Men in This Town", in which Shakira sings about the lack of eligible bachelors in Los Angeles. The song contains references to American actors Angelina Jolie and Matt Damon, the latter of whom Shakira knows personally, and popular destinations like the SkyBar. Jocelyn Vena from MTV commented that "Shakira wasn't afraid to get a little wacky when it came to the lyrics on She Wolf". In an interview with Jim Cantiello, the singer was asked for the reason behind lyrics like "I'm so happy I should get sued" (in the track "Long Time"), to which Shakira replied "Maybe it rhymed. It's hard to explain your own lyrics, you know". In "Mon Amour", she wishes that her ex-boyfriend and his new girlfriend have a terrible vacation in Paris and are eaten alive by "French fleas". Other themes the album touches upon include night-life, sex, and seduction, in songs like "Did It Again" and "Spy". Rolling Stone critic Jody Rosen labelled the latter "a meditation on masturbation".

== Release and promotion ==
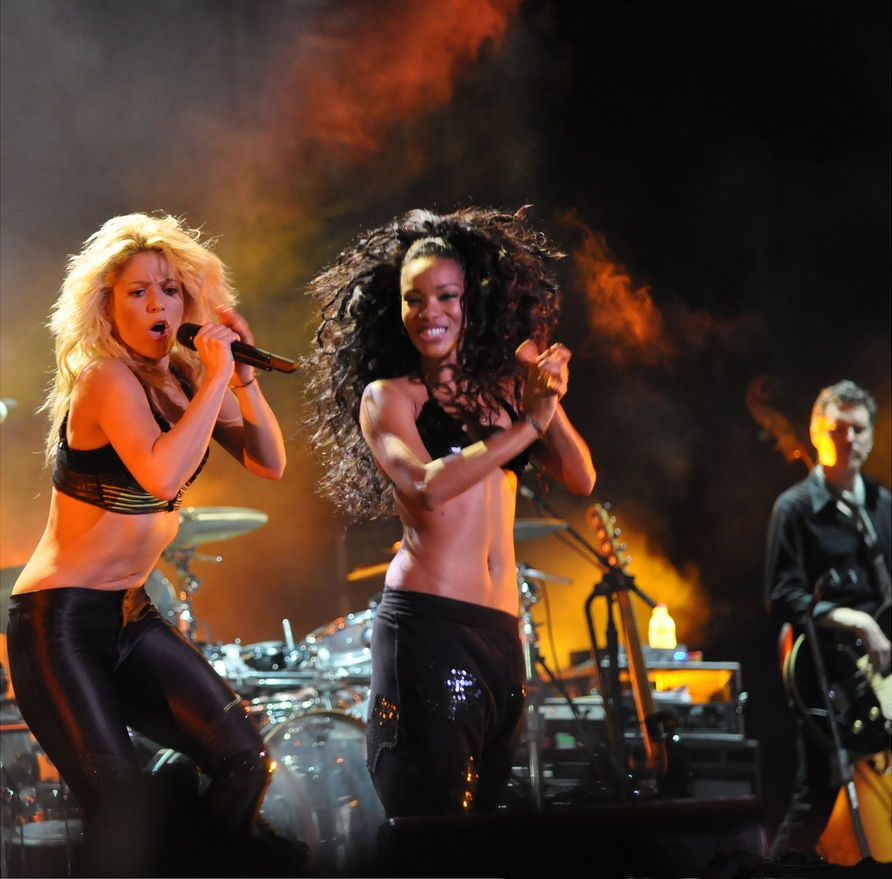
Shakira performing the lead single "She Wolf" during a concert show of the Sun Comes Out World Tour

She Wolf was released on 9 October 2009, in Germany, Austria, Belgium, Italy, Ireland, the Netherlands and Switzerland. In the rest of Europe and Latin America, the album was released on 12 October, with subsequent releases in Spain, Japan, and Australia. It was scheduled to be released on 13 October in the United States, but was delayed and instead was released on 23 November. The reason for this delay was because Ghost decided to include the last-minute Timbaland production "Give It Up to Me" on the track list of the US version of the album. In 2010, She Wolf was reissued as Loba in Hispanic countries, which features additional remixes of the Spanish-language songs on the original album.

=== Singles ===
The title track "She Wolf" was released as the lead single from the album on 10 July 2009. It was well received by music critics, who praised its disco influences and unusual lyrics. Commercially, the song was a success and charted in the top 10 of countries like Belgium, Italy, Germany, Spain and the United Kingdom. In the United States, it peaked at number 11 on the Billboard Hot 100 chart, and at number one on the Billboard Hot Dance Club Songs chart. "Loba", the Spanish-language version of the song, peaked at number one on the Billboard Hot Latin Songs and Tropical Songs charts. An accompanying music video was directed for the song by Jake Nava, and features Shakira dancing in various surroundings like a red cave and a golden cage.

"Did It Again" was released as the second single off the album worldwide on 16 October 2009, excluding the United States, where it was substituted by "Give It Up to Me". The song was met with positive reviews from music critics and was complimented for its expressive songwriting. Commercially, the song was moderately successful and charted within the top 20 of various countries. In the United States, "Did It Again" peaked at number one on the Billboard Hot Dance Club Songs. The Spanish-language version of the song "Lo Hecho Está Hecho" peaked at number six on the Billboard Hot Latin Songs chart and at number 11 on the Billboard Tropical Songs chart. An accompanying music video for the song was directed by Sophie Muller, and features Shakira fighting a man in a bedroom.

"Give It Up to Me", which features vocals from American rapper Lil Wayne, was commissioned as the third single off the album. It was officially released only in the United States, on 26 October 2009. The song received generally favourable reviews from music critics and was appreciated for its production. It peaked at number 29 on the Billboard Hot 100 and at number 23 on the Pop Songs charts. An accompanying music video for the song was directed by Sophie Muller and features scenes of Shakira and Lil Wayne interspersed between scenes of Shakira dancing.

"Gypsy" was released as the fourth and final single off the album on 26 March 2010. The song generated a positive response from music critics, many of whom praised its acoustic-styled production. Commercially, the single was a success and charted inside the top 10 in countries like Germany, Mexico and Spain. "Gypsy" peaked at number 65 on the US Billboard Hot 100 chart, while the Spanish-language version of the song "Gitana" peaked at number six on the Billboard Hot Latin Songs chart. An accompanying music video for the song, directed by Jaume de Laiguana, stars Spanish professional tennis player Rafael Nadal as Shakira's love interest.

=== Tour ===
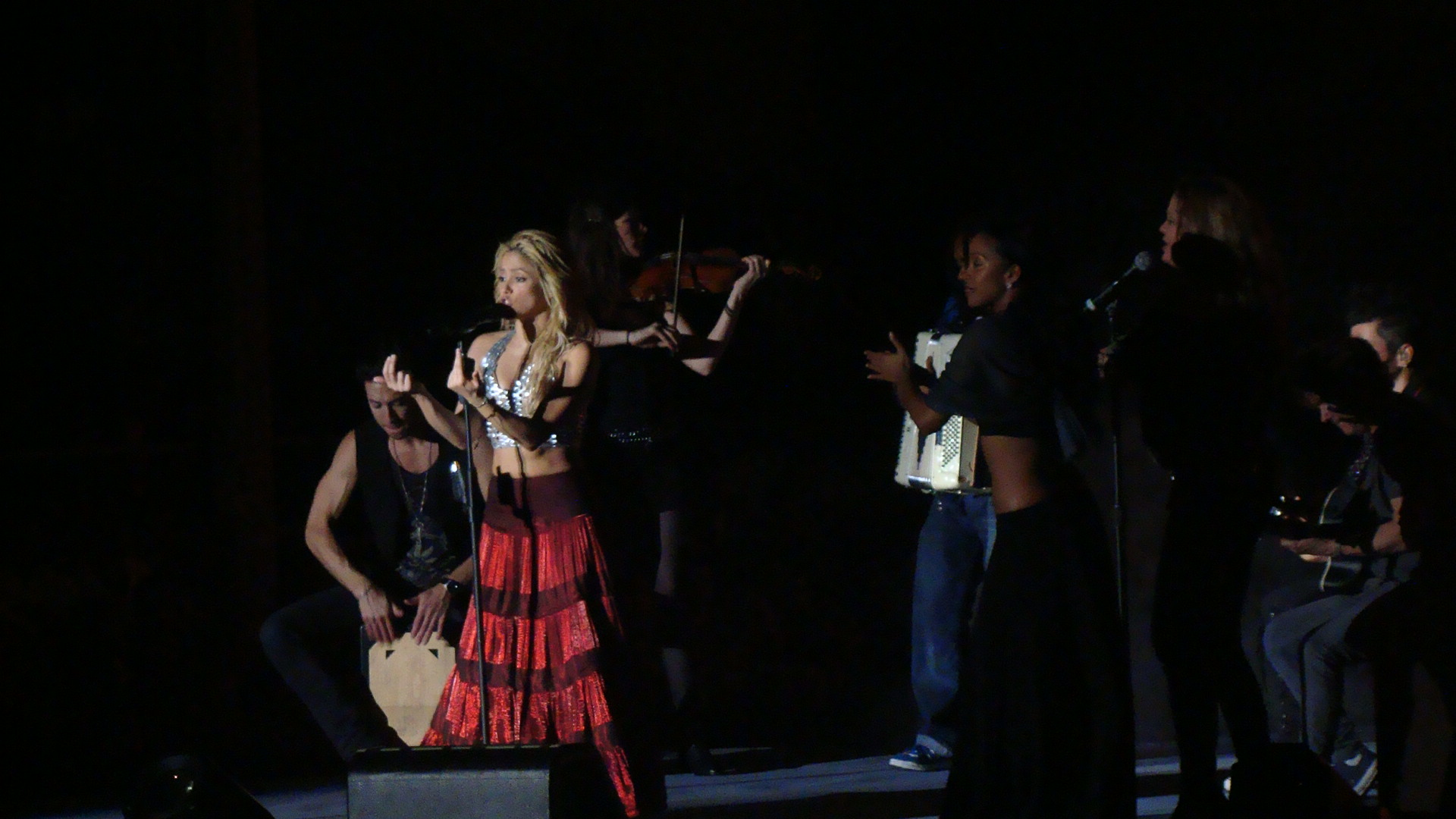
Shakira performing "Gypsy" on the Sun Comes Out World Tour

Shakira embarked on the Sun Comes Out World Tour in late 2010, to promote She Wolf along with her ninth studio album Sale el Sol (2010). Shakira's official website first announced the three initial venues of the North American leg of the tour, on 3 May 2010, and subsequently 22 more venues were listed. After a special tour preview show held in Montreal, Canada, on 2 August 2010, the North American leg of the tour commenced at Uncasville, Connecticut, on 17 September, and closed at Rosemont, Illinois, on 29 October 2010. The initial dates for the European leg of the tour were announced on 28 June 2010, and subsequently 22 more shows were listed. The European leg of the tour was planned to commence at Lyon, France, on 16 November, and end in London, England, on 20 December 2010. The tickets for the initial dates of the European leg were soon sold out, and Shakira extended the tour into 2011, beginning by announcing a show at Paris, France; venues at countries such as Croatia, Russia, Spain and Switzerland were soon added. The Latin American leg of the tour was a part of the Pop Festival, which was heralded as an initiative to bring international music stars to Latin America. Initial tour dates for the leg were announced on 3 December 2010, and soon venues at countries like Argentina, Brazil, Colombia and Mexico were added to the tour dates.

The title track, "Why Wait", and "Gypsy" were the only songs from She Wolf to be included on the setlist for the tour. The stage was shaped like the letter "T" to enable a maximum number of viewers to see Shakira easily. A large screen was set behind the stage, on which various visuals, designed by entertainment branding agency Loyalkaspar, were projected. For the performances, Shakira mainly wore a mesh gold crop top coupled with skin-tight leather pants. Other attires Shakira wore during the concert shows included a hooded pink gown, a flamenco-skirt, and a feathery blue dress.

The concert shows were well received by critics, many of whom praised the charisma Shakira displayed during the performances. Commercially, the tour was a success. It ranked at number 40 on Pollstar's 2010 year-end "Top 50 North American Tours" list as it grossed a total of $16.9 million in the continent, with total ticket sales amounting up to 524,723. In North America, the tour sold an average of 9,335 tickets, and a total of 205,271 tickets. The tour was a bigger success worldwide, ranking at number 20 on Pollstar's 2011 "Top 25 Worldwide Tours" with a total gross of $53.2 million and ticket sales amounting up to 692,064. A live album of the show held at the Palais Omnisports de Paris-Bercy in Paris, France, was released as Shakira: Live from Paris, on 5 December 2011.

== Critical reception ==
Professional ratings
Aggregate scores
Source	Rating
Metacritic	72/100
Review scores
Source	Rating
AllMusic	4/5 stars
Billboard	3/5 stars
The Daily Telegraph	3/5 stars
Entertainment Weekly	A−
The Guardian	3/5 stars
MusicOMH	4/5 stars
The Observer	4/5 stars
Q	4/5 stars
Rolling Stone	4/5 stars
Slant Magazine	3/5 stars

At Metacritic, which assigns a normalized rating out of 100 to reviews from mainstream critics, She Wolf received an average score of 72 based on 15 reviews, indicating "generally favourable reviews". Stephen Thomas Erlewine from AllMusic gave the album a very positive review and concluded that She Wolf is a "celebration of all the strange sensuality that comes out at night". Simon Vozick-Levinson from Entertainment Weekly praised the production and music of the album, calling the album "some of the most unusually effective dance-floor dynamite you're likely to encounter all year". David Balls from Digital Spy complimented Shakira's ability to "mix this album's eclectic range of influences into a listenable, cohesive collection of songs", but also noted that some fans may be disappointed over the fact that "She Wolf downplays Shakira's Latin-pop routes in favor of a sound that will appeal to radio playlisters the world over". Neil McCormick from The Daily Telegraph praised Shakira's inventiveness on the album and summed up the review by saying "incongruous elements only add to the perfection of Shakira's She Wolf". Michael Cragg from MusicOMH singled out the tracks produced by The Neptunes as the best on the album, and also noted that they are "very much Shakira songs, not merely songs produced by The Neptunes". Johnny Davis from The Observer labelled the album "preposterously brilliant", while Mike Diver from BBC Music thought it was "perhaps the most enjoyably varied pop album of 2009". Jody Rosen from Rolling Stone was also positive towards the album and called Shakira a "charmer — a globe-straddling star you can cuddle up to". Joey Guerra from Seattle Post-Intelligencer gave the album a very positive review, praising Shakira's exploration of world music and her experimentation, saying "every song goes to completely unexpected places, veering from a perfectly commercial shine to avant-garde pop." Guerra also commended the Neptunes' production, calling She Wolf "Shakira's most compelling, consistently entertaining disc since 1998's Dónde Están los Ladrones?," and concluded that "Shakira has created some of the most weirdly wonderful pop of the past year." Moreover, the critic felt that Shakira had not completely abandoned her musical roots and commented: "the rumors of Shakira's vanishing Latina identity have been grossly exaggerated."

Ayala Ben-Yehuda from Billboard positively noted that the album was "certainly more adventurous than anything from her peers", but felt that its execution seemed a "little forced". She singled out the tracks "Gypsy" and "Why Wait" as album highlights. Sal Cinquemani from Slant Magazine thought that "she (Shakira) takes quite well to the (electro-pop) sound", but felt that the album had a "bit of an identity problem". Ben Ratliff from The New York Times gave the album a negative review and criticized The Neptunes' productions. He concluded the review by saying that "there should be no American edition of Shakira: you just take her, in all her daffiness, or leave her".

=== Accolades ===
She Wolf was included in AllMusic's year-end "Favorite Albums," "Favorite Latin Albums," and "Favorite Pop Albums" lists. At the 2010 Premios Oye! awards ceremony, the album received a nomination in the category "Spanish Album of the Year". At the 2010 Premios Shock awards ceremony, it was nominated "Album of the Year". Shakira was nominated for "Best International Female Solo Artist" at the 2010 Brit Awards; it was her second nomination for the award.

== Commercial performance ==
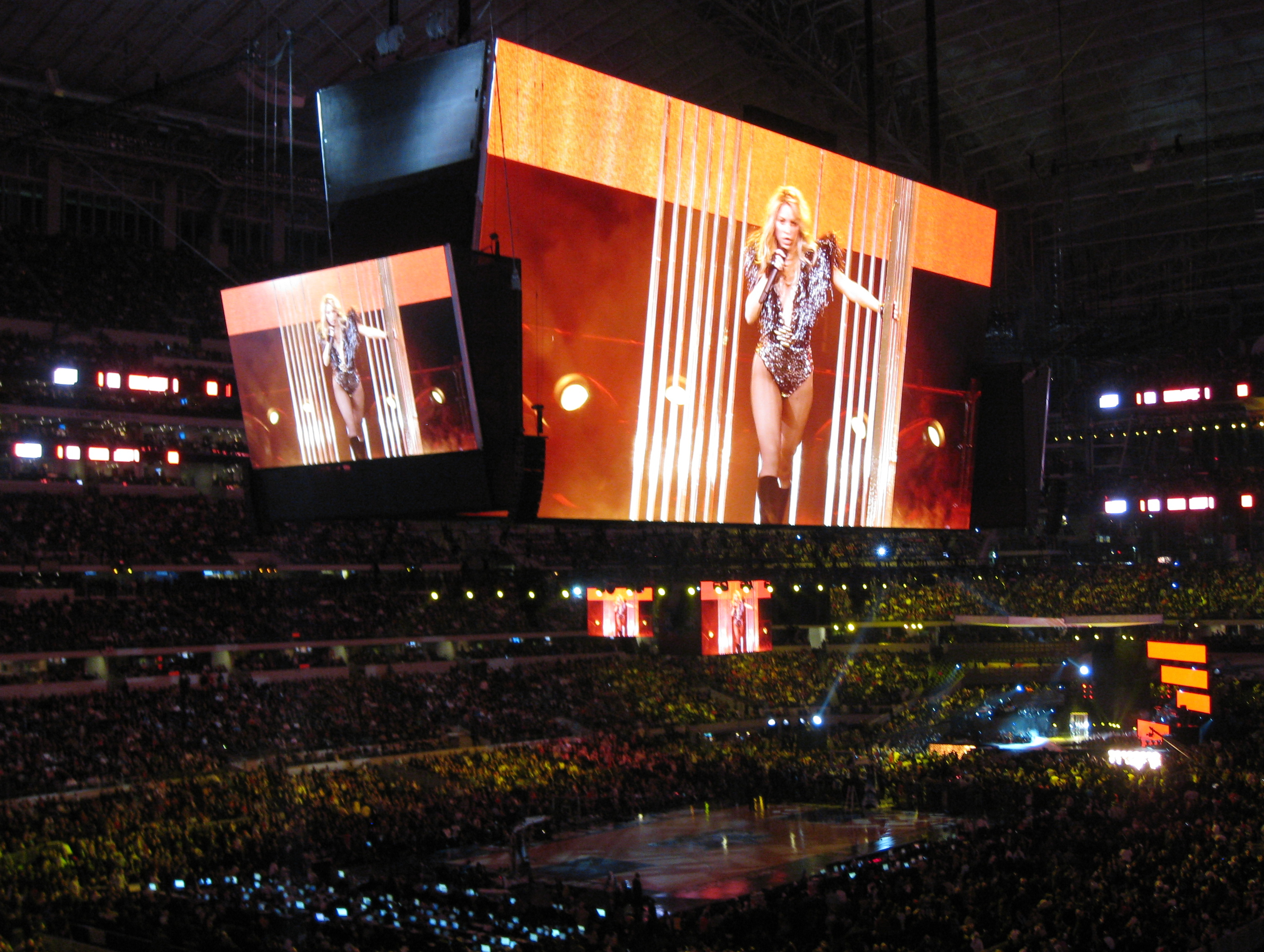
Shakira performing "She Wolf" at the 2010 NBA All-Star Game

In Austria, the album entered and peaked at number four on the Ö3 Austria Top 40 chart, staying on the chart for a total of 15 weeks. After debuting at number seven on the French Albums Chart, She Wolf went on to chart for a total of 79 weeks. The Syndicat National de l'Édition Phonographique (SNEP) certified the album gold for shipment of 50,000 copies. She Wolf debuted atop the Irish Albums Chart, displacing American recording artist Madonna's album Celebration from the top position. It was consequently certified gold by the Irish Recorded Music Association (IRMA). In Italy, the album entered the top 20 of the FIMI Albums Chart at number seven and later peaked at number one for two consecutive weeks. It became Shakira's first studio album to reach number one in the country. She Wolf stayed on the chart for a total of 20 weeks and was certified platinum for selling more than 60,000 copies in the country. In Portugal, the album debuted outside of the top 10 of albums chart, but later re-entered the chart at its peak position of number five. Its total stay on the chart, however, was short and lasted for five weeks. She Wolf became Shakira's first studio album since Laundry Service (2001) to reach number one on the Swiss Albums Chart after it debuted at the top spot. The album appeared on the chart for 46 weeks in total. The International Federation of the Phonographic Industry (IFPI) certified it gold for selling in excess of 15,000 units in Switzerland. In the United Kingdom, the album entered and peaked at number four on the UK Albums Chart, and charted for seven weeks inside the top 40. She Wolf was certified gold by the British Phonographic Industry (BPI) for shipping 100,000 units in the region.

The Spanish-titled version of the album, Loba, was a success in Latin America. The album was certified gold for selling 20,000 units in Argentina. In Mexico, it debuted at number one on the Mexican Albums Chart. The success of the album in the country was such that it had shipped 90,000 units within a week and was certified platinum and gold by the Asociación Mexicana de Productores de Fonogramas y Videogramas (AMPROFON). It stayed atop the chart for four consecutive weeks, while its total stay lasted for 43 weeks. AMPROFON eventually certified the album double-platinum for shipments of 120,000 units. In Spain, the album entered and peaked at number two on the Spanish Albums Chart, staying on the chart for a total of 54 weeks. Loba was certified platinum by the Productores de Música de España (PROMUSICAE) for shipments of 60,000 units. Two months after its release, She Wolf had sold 1.5 million copies in Europe and Latin America. In the United States, She Wolf debuted and peaked at number 15 on the Billboard 200, with sales of 89,000 units. The album spent a total of 14 weeks on the chart. Its chart performance in the US was said to be Shakira's weakest in 10 years, and it became her first studio album since Dónde Están los Ladrones? (1998) to miss peaking inside the top 10. According to New York Times, the album has sold 352,000 copies in the US as of October 14, 2010. On the Digital Albums chart, the album peaked at number eight, spending a total of one week on the chart. Media outlets credited the poor performance of the album in the country to Ghost's involvement, particularly her last-minute decision to delay its release in order to add "Give It Up to Me" to the track list "after it already had been mastered and ready to ship." 20 months after her run as the president of Epic, Ghost was fired from the record label. She Wolf was the 47th best-selling album in the world in 2009, according to the IFPI.

== Track listing ==
Standard edition
No.	Title	Lyrics	Music	Production	Length
1.	"She Wolf"	Shakira	Shakira; John Hill; Sam Endicott	Shakira; Hill	3:10
2.	"Did It Again"	Shakira; Pharrell Williams	Shakira; Williams	Shakira; The Neptunes	3:13
3.	"Long Time"	Shakira; Williams	Shakira; Williams	Shakira; The Neptunes	2:56
4.	"Why Wait"	Shakira; Williams	Shakira; Williams	Shakira; The Neptunes	3:43
5.	"Good Stuff"	Shakira; Williams	Shakira; Williams	Shakira; The Neptunes	3:18
6.	"Men in This Town"	Shakira	Shakira; Hill; Endicott	Shakira; Hill	3:36
7.	"Gypsy"	Amanda Ghost; Shakira; Ian Dench; Carl Sturken; Evan Rogers	Ghost; Shakira; Dench; Sturken; Rogers	Shakira; Ghost; Lukas Burton; Future Cut	3:18
8.	"Spy" (featuring Wyclef Jean)	Shakira; Jean	Shakira; Jean	Shakira; Jean; Jerry Duplessis	3:27
9.	"Mon Amour"	Shakira; Albert Menendez	Shakira; Menendez	Shakira; Hill	4:06
10.	"Lo Hecho Está Hecho"	Shakira; Jorge Drexler	Shakira; Williams	Shakira; The Neptunes	3:13
11.	"Años Luz"	Shakira; Drexler	Shakira; Williams	Shakira; The Neptunes	3:44
12.	"Loba"	Shakira; Drexler	Shakira; Hill; Endicott	Shakira; Hill	3:09
Total length:					40:50

Standard edition Japan bonus track
No.	Title	Lyrics	Music	Production	Length
13.	"She Wolf" (Calvin Harris remix)	Shakira	Shakira; Hill; Endicott	Shakira; Hill	4:46

Standard edition Middle East bonus tracks
No.	Title	Lyrics	Music	Production	Length
13.	"She Wolf" (Said Mrad remix)	Shakira	Shakira; Hill; Endicott	Shakira; Hill	5:42
14.	"She Wolf" (Fahmy & Samba's SphinxMix club mix)	Shakira	Shakira; Hill; Endicott	Shakira; Hill	3:59
15.	"She Wolf" (Mindloop Collective mix)	Shakira	Shakira; Hill; Endicott	Shakira; Hill	3:44

She Wolf – expanded edition
No.	Title	Lyrics	Music	Production	Length
10.	"Loba"	Shakira; Drexler	Shakira; Hill; Endicott	Shakira; Hill	3:09
11.	"Lo Hecho Está Hecho"	Shakira; Drexler	Shakira; Williams	Shakira; The Neptunes	3:13
12.	"Años Luz"	Shakira; Drexler	Shakira; Williams	Shakira; The Neptunes	3:44
13.	"Give It Up to Me" (featuring Lil Wayne)	Shakira; Timothy Mosley; Dwayne Carter; Amanda Ghost; Jerome "J-Roc" Harmon	Shakira; Mosley; Carter; Amanda Ghost; Harmon	Timbaland; Harmon	3:06
14.	"Did It Again" (featuring Kid Cudi)	Shakira; Williams; Scott Mescudi	Shakira; Williams	Shakira; The Neptunes	3:50
15.	"Gypsy" (live)	Amanda Ghost; Shakira; Dench; Sturken; Rogers	Amanda Ghost; Shakira; Dench; Sturken; Rogers		3:27
16.	"She Wolf" (live)	Shakira	Shakira; Hill; Endicott		3:11

She Wolf – 2024 LP expanded edition
No.	Title	Lyrics	Music	Production	Length
10.	"Loba"	Shakira; Drexler	Shakira; Hill; Endicott	Shakira; Hill	3:09
11.	"Lo Hecho Está Hecho"	Shakira; Drexler	Shakira; Williams	Shakira; The Neptunes	3:13
12.	"Años Luz"	Shakira; Drexler	Shakira; Williams	Shakira; The Neptunes	3:44
13.	"Give It Up to Me" (featuring Lil Wayne)	Shakira; Timothy Mosley; Dwayne Carter; Amanda Ghost; Jerome "J-Roc" Harmon	Shakira; Mosley; Carter; Amanda Ghost; Harmon	Timbaland; Harmon	3:06
14.	"Did It Again" (featuring Kid Cudi)	Shakira; Williams; Scott Mescudi	Shakira; Williams	Shakira; The Neptunes	3:50
15.	"Gitana"	Amanda Ghost; Shakira; Dench; Sturken; Rogers; Drexler			3:27

She Wolf – 2024 digital expanded edition
No.	Title	Lyrics	Music	Production	Length
16.	"Lo Hecho Está Hecho" (featuring Pitbull)	Shakira; Drexler; Armando Pérez	Shakira; Williams	Shakira; The Neptunes	4:24
17.	"Gypsy" (live)	Amanda Ghost; Shakira; Dench; Sturken; Rogers	Amanda Ghost; Shakira; Dench; Sturken; Rogers		3:27
18.	"She Wolf" (live)	Shakira	Shakira; Hill; Endicott		3:11

Loba standard edition
No.	Title	Length
1.	"Loba"	3:09
2.	"Lo Hecho Está Hecho"	3:13
3.	"Años Luz"	3:44
4.	"Long Time"	2:56
5.	"Good Stuff"	3:18
6.	"Men in This Town"	3:36
7.	"Gypsy"	3:18
8.	"Spy" (featuring Wyclef Jean)	3:27
9.	"Mon Amour"	4:06
10.	"Did It Again"	3:13
11.	"Why Wait"	3:43
12.	"She Wolf"	3:10

Loba expanded version (bonus tracks)
No.	Title	Lyrics	Length
13.	"Gitana"	Amanda Ghost; Shakira; Dench; Sturken; Rogers; Drexler	3:27
14.	"Lo Hecho Está Hecho" (featuring Pitbull)		4:24
15.	"Gypsy" (live)		3:27
16.	"She Wolf" (Deeplick Club remix)		7:05
17.	"Loba" (Deep Mariano radio mix)		4:34

Loba Spanish, Mexican, Argentinean edition
No.	Title	Length
1.	"Loba"	3:09
2.	"Lo Hecho Está Hecho"	3:13
3.	"Años Luz"	3:44
4.	"She Wolf"	3:10
5.	"Did It Again"	3:13
6.	"Long Time"	2:56
7.	"Why Wait"	3:43
8.	"Good Stuff"	3:18
9.	"Men in This Town"	3:36
10.	"Gypsy"	3:18
11.	"Spy" (featuring Wyclef Jean)	3:27
12.	"Mon Amour"	4:06
13.	"Give It Up to Me" (featuring Lil Wayne)	3:06
14.	"Did It Again" (featuring Kid Cudi)	3:50
15.	"Gypsy" (live)	3:27
16.	"She Wolf" (live)	3:11
17.	"Lo Hecho Está Hecho" (featuring Pitbull)	4:24

She Wolf premium edition (bonus DVD)
No.	Title	Length
1.	"She Wolf" (music video)	3:49
2.	"She Wolf" (making of the video)	16:33
3.	"Gypsy" (live)	3:27
4.	"Why Wait" (live)	3:24
5.	"Interview"	5:11

== Personnel ==
Credits adapted from AllMusic.

- Mert Alaş – photography
- Michael Brauer – mixing engineer
- Lukas Burton – producer
- Míguel Bustamante – mixing assistant
- Gustavo Celis – engineer, mixing engineer, vocal engineer, vocal mixing
- Olgui Chirino – vocals (background)
- Dave Clauss – engineer
- Andrew Coleman – arranger, digital editing, engineer
- Jorge Drexler – lyricist
- Jerry Duplessis – producer
- Future Cut – producer
- Amanda Ghost – producer
- Ryan Gilligan – mixing assistant
- Hart Gunther – assistant engineer
- Will Hensley – mixing assistant
- Mario Inchausti – vocal arrangement
- Wyclef Jean – producer, background vocals
- Alladin El Kashef – engineer
- Jaume Laiguana – art direction, design
- Michael Larson – assistant engineer
- Alex Leader – engineer
- Stephen Marcussen – mastering
- PJ McGinnis – assistant engineer
- Vlado Meller – mastering
- Miami Symphonic Strings – string arrangements
- Walter Murphy – horn arrangements, string arrangements
- The Neptunes – producer
- Jessica Nolan – project supervisor
- Dave Pensado – mixing engineer
- Marcus Piggott – photography
- Ed Rack – engineer
- Hossam Ramzy – percussion arrangement, string arrangements
- Andros Rodriguez – digital editing, engineer, mixing, vocal engineer
- Christina Rodriguez – art direction, design
- Jon Secada – vocal arrangement
- Shakira – art direction, design, lyricist, percussion arrangement, producer, string arrangements, vocal arrangement, background vocals
- Serge Tsai – engineer, vocal engineer
- Sergio "Sergical" Tsai – mixing engineer
- Joe Vilicic – engineer
- William Villane – mixing assistant
- Lawson White – string arrangements
- Ed Williams – vocal engineer
- Andrew Wuepper – mixing assistant

== Charts ==
=== Weekly charts ===
Weekly chart performance for She Wolf
Chart (2009–10)	Peak position
Austrian Albums (Ö3 Austria)	4
Belgian Albums (Ultratop Flanders)	12
Belgian Albums (Ultratop Wallonia)	11
Brazilian Albums (ABPD)	11
Canadian Albums (Billboard)	18
Croatian International Albums (HDU)	6
Czech Albums (ČNS IFPI)	89
Danish Albums (Hitlisten)	31
Dutch Albums (Album Top 100)	5
Finnish Albums (Suomen virallinen lista)	21
French Albums (SNEP)	7
German Albums (Offizielle Top 100)	3
Greek Albums (IFPI)	22
Hungarian Albums (MAHASZ)	23
Irish Albums (IRMA)	1
Italian Albums (FIMI)	1
Japanese Albums (Oricon)	26
Mexican Albums (Top 100 Mexico)	1
Norwegian Albums (VG-lista)	24
Polish Albums (ZPAV)	17
Portuguese Albums (AFP)	5
Scottish Albums (Official Charts)	3
Spanish Albums (Promusicae)	2
Swedish Albums (Sverigetopplistan)	23
Swiss Albums (Schweizer Hitparade)	1
UK Albums (Official Charts)	4
US Billboard 200	15

=== Year-end charts ===
2009 year-end chart performance for She Wolf
Chart (2009)	Position
French Albums (SNEP)	121
Italian Albums (FIMI)	94
Mexican Albums (AMPROFON)	12
Spanish Albums (PROMUSICAE)	38
Swiss Albums (Schweizer Hitparade)	78
UK Albums (OCC)	165

2010 year-end chart performance for She Wolf
Chart (2010)	Position
European Albums (Billboard)	74
Hungarian Albums (MAHASZ)	69
Italian Albums (FIMI)	17
Mexican Albums (AMPROFON)	41
Spanish Albums (PROMUSICAE)	24
Swiss Albums (Schweizer Hitparade)	84
US Billboard 200	114

== Certifications and sales ==
Region	Certification	Certified units/sales
Argentina (CAPIF)	Gold	20,000^{^}
Argentina (CAPIF) Loba (América Latina/España)	Gold	20,000^{^}
Brazil (Pro-Música Brasil)	Platinum	60,000^{‡}
Canada (Music Canada)	Gold	40,000^{‡}
Chile (IFPI Chile)	2× Platinum	
Colombia (ASINCOL)	2× Platinum	15,000
Colombia Digital streams	Gold	
France (SNEP)	Gold	50,000^{*}
GCC (IFPI Middle East)	Platinum	6,000^{*}
Germany (BVMI)	Gold	100,000^{^}
Greece (IFPI Greece)	Gold	3,000^{^}
Hungary (MAHASZ)	Gold	3,000^{^}
Ireland (IRMA)	Gold	7,500^{^}
Italy (FIMI)	Platinum	70,000^{*}
Mexico (AMPROFON)	2× Platinum+Gold	150,000^{‡}
Poland (ZPAV)	Platinum	20,000^{‡}
Spain (Promusicae)	Platinum	60,000^{^}
Switzerland (IFPI Switzerland)	Gold	15,000^{^}
United Kingdom (BPI)	Gold	100,000^{^}
United States	—	352,000
Venezuela (APFV)	Gold	
Summaries
Worldwide	—	2,000,000
^{*} Sales figures based on certification alone.^{^} Shipments figures based on certification alone.^{‡} Sales+streaming figures based on certification alone.

== See also ==
- List of number-one albums of 2009 (Ireland)
- List of number-one albums of 2009 (Mexico)
