= Men in This Town =

Song by Shakira

from the album She Wolf
- Released: 2009
- Genre: Hyperpop; alternative rock; electroclash
- Length: 3:36
- Label: Epic
- Composers: Shakira; John Hill; Samuel Endicott
- Lyricist: Shakira
- Producers: Shakira; John Hill

"Men in This Town" is a song by Colombian singer-songwriter Shakira recorded for her eighth studio album, She Wolf (2009). Combining hyperpop, alternative rock and electroclash, its lyrics talk about trying to find love in Los Angeles. The song resurfaced in 2025 on social media, leading up to Shakira indicating she might perform it for the first time ever live over a decade after its release.

== Background and release ==
"I wanted to make sure that this album was very bassy and that the kicks hit really hard, and I wanted to concentrate on the beat. But my music, to a certain extent, is very complex — because I always try to experiment with sounds from other parts of the world."

— Shakira on She Wolf.

Shakira wrote 60 songs for her eighth studio album She Wolf, and "Men in This Town" was one of the 10 that ended up on the record. The album missed initial deadlines for being worked on for so long, because Shakira wanted it to be successful and for it to be her 'moment' in the US. “This is my chance to consolidate a career and my dreams as an artist in the U.S., so that I can continue making music for a long time and traveling the world", she commented. She chose to venture into dance music with the album, as she aspired to have the artistic freedom to experiment with any sound, believing that the genre is just right for that: "This was a sonic experimental trip. I wanted to play around with electronica, beats, synthesizers..." "I haven't censored myself", she commented on the songs with "harder sounds, with very solid beats." When the album was released on 9 October 2009, "Men in This Town" instantly became a fan favorite.

== Composition ==
"Men in This Town" is a hyperpop, alternative rock and electroclash song. With the music following a chord progression of Dm—Bb—F—C throughout, the song starts off with a California-esque electric guitar, before lifting off into a celestial and pulsating electronic production with disco-style breakdowns. Shakira alters her voice on the bridge, making it sound gritty and rough, before shifting to a high, dreamy tone.

The song features themes of disenchantment and irony intertwined with heartfelt emotion. The lyrics explore being patient and hoping to find a decent man in the clubs of the superficial California: "Is there a prince in this fable for a small-town girl like me?" The lyrics contain references to Matt Damon and Angelina Jolie, as well as the city of Los Angeles and SkyBar. The song concludes with lyrics about "a suicide waiting".

As for the lyrics yearning for Damon ("The good ones are gone or not able/ And Matt Damon's not meant for me"), Shakira wondered if she should send an apology note to his wife Luciana Barroso telling her not to worry. Damon soon commented that he was honored to be mentioned in the lyrics, and that he is a fan of Shakira. He also revealed that Shakira did send him and his wife a "sweet note." Shakira's history with Damon goes back to earlier in the 2000s, when she was offered a role in a movie where she would have acted alongside Damon, but she could not make it due to time constraints.

== Reception ==
Critics lauded "Men in This Town" for its fresh, youthful energy and infectious dance-pop vibes, highlighting Shakira's raw vocal energy and her successful exploration of new musical boundaries, and dynamics. The song was also praised for its clever lyrics and its potential to become a major hit was noted.

Brian White from why so blu? mentioned that the song is probably his favorite from the album, for being "fresh and youthful", having infectous vibes and Shakira's "raw energy." He noted that Shakira's vocals explore new boundaries, dynamics, and styles that she has not previously showcased. He also claimed that the song has potential to achieve significant success, possibly more so in European markets, becoming popular in dance venues. Gary Trust from Billboard listed "Men in This Town" as one of the "five likely 2010 radio hits … if they’d been released to radio." Totally Dublin described "Men in This Town", and "Spy" from the same album, as "particularly impressive amazing dance pop to enliven any night out." The Diamondback emphasized how Shakira ventured beyond her usual musical boundaries with the song, successfully pushing her limits. The newspaper also highlighted the song's clever lyrics. In 2014, Robert Copsey from Digital Spy listed "Men in This Town" as one of Shakira's ten best songs. Nueva News noted the song's "blend of humor and danceable rhythm" showcasing Shakira's evolution, and called the song's tone "catchy and ironic."

== Commercial performance ==
In August 2025, "Men in This Town" charted among the top songs on iTunes in multiple countries, including Colombia, Mexico, Costa Rica, Brazil, Spain, and Honduras.

== Live performances ==
Following an intense campaign from fans on social media, Shakira alluded on an Instagram reel that got over 5 million views in less than 24 hours that she will perform her song "Men in This Town" during her two Las Mujeres Ya No Lloran World Tour dates at SoFi Stadium in Los Angeles, California. These performances were set to be the live debut for the song, scheduled for 4 August and 5 August 2025. Kenneth Triviño rom Ecuavisa commented that the song would resonate well with the empowerment themes of the tour.

On 4 August 2025 in Los Angeles, Shakira performed "Men in This Town" live for the first time, creating excitement among the crowd. During the song's performance, she wore a sequined cap paired with an oversized T-shirt featuring a sequined wolf graphic and the name of the city. The screen on the stage had a text reading "Where are all the men in this town?" The performance was dubbed "a dream come true" by her fans on social media. Francis Aleman from Honduran El País noted that Shakira was confident and that "her stage presence oozed energy". Maria Loreto from ¡Hola! commented that Shakira has "been surprising fans with performances of her oldest songs", now "[opting] for one of her most obscure, giving her fans a moment that they won't forget anytime soon."
