= Gypsy (Shakira song) =

Single by Shakira

from the album She Wolf
- B-side: "Gitana"
- Released: 26 March 2010
- Recorded: 2009
- Studio: Compass Point Studios (Nassau, Bahamas)
- Genre: Worldbeat
- Length: 3:16 (English version); 3:26 (Spanish version)
- Label: Epic
- Songwriters: Amanda Ghost; Shakira; Ian Dench; Carl Sturken; Evan Rogers
- Producers: Shakira; Amanda Ghost; Lukas Burton; Future Cut

Shakira singles chronology
| "Give It Up to Me" (2009) | "Gypsy" (2010) | "Waka Waka (This Time for Africa)" (2010) |

Music videos
- "Gypsy" on YouTube; "Gitana" on YouTube

"Gypsy" is a song by Colombian singer-songwriter Shakira, from her eighth studio album She Wolf (2009). The song was chosen as the fourth and final single from the album by Epic Records. It was released internationally on 26 March 2010; in the United States, "Gypsy" was released as a CD single on 12 April 2010. The Spanish-language version "Gitana" was released as a digital promotional single on 1 March 2010. Written by Amanda Ghost with additional composition by Shakira, Carl Sturken and Evan Rogers, the lyrics of the song describe one's life travelling as a "gypsy". The song draws heavy influences from Indian bhangra music.

Upon its release, "Gypsy" received generally positive reviews from music critics, many of whom complimented its production. The single was commercially successful and peaked at number one within the charts of Mexico and Romania as well as the top 10 in the Czech Republic, Germany, Hungary, Poland, and Spain. In the United States, "Gypsy" peaked at number 65 on the Billboard Hot 100 chart, while "Gitana" reached number six on the Billboard Hot Latin Songs chart. "Gypsy" was certified platinum and gold in Spain and Mexico, respectively.

An accompanying music video for the song was directed by Jaume de Laiguana, and stars Spanish professional tennis player Rafael Nadal as Shakira's love interest. The music video also generated a favourable response from critics, and was praised for the chemistry between Shakira and Nadal. Shakira appeared on a number of television shows, such as German-language entertainment show Wetten, dass..? and The Ellen DeGeneres Show, and award ceremonies to promote the song. It was also a part of the setlist of her Sun Comes Out World Tour.

== Background and composition ==
"Gypsy"
A 20-second sample of "Gypsy" containing part of the chorus. The song contains Indian bhangra music

"Gypsy" was released as the fourth and final single from Shakira's eighth studio album, She Wolf (2009). "Gypsy" was written by Amanda Ghost with additional composition by Shakira, Ian Dench, Carl Sturken and Evan Rogers, and produced by Shakira, Ghost, Lukas Burton and Future Cut. Written in a ballad-like form, the lyrics of the song describe life travelling on the road as a "gypsy". Shakira explained the song, saying "(The song represents my) way of living and seeing life. I've been on the road since I was very young so that's where the gypsy metaphor comes from." Musically, "Gypsy" is heavily influenced by Indian bhangra music, and features instrumentation from the mandolin, banjo, sitar and tabla. According to the music sheet published at Musicnotes.com by Sony/ATV Music Publishing, "Gypsy" is a midtempo song written in the key of D flat major, with a metronome of 100 beats per minute. Shakira's vocal range on the song spans from A3 to C5.

The original English version of the song was released worldwide on 26 March 2010. In the United States, it was released as a CD single on 12 April 2010. A Spanish-language version of the song titled "Gitana" features additional lyrical contributions from Jorge Drexler and was released on 1 March 2010, as a digital promotional single.

== Critical response ==
"Gypsy" received generally positive reviews from music critics. While reviewing the album, Ayala Ben-Yehuda from Billboard singled out the song as an album highlight and called it "the closest thing to an acoustic song on the album". Fraser McAlpine from the BBC Chart Blog also reviewed the song positively and praised its versatility, claiming it manages to be both "conservative acoustic music" and "radical exotic world music" at the same time. Robert Copsey from Digital Spy appreciated the acoustic-instrumentation of "Gypsy", noting it to be "by far the most organic-sounding offering from her She Wolf LP", but he also felt that the song is not "as instantly infectious as some of her classic singles". Stephen Thomas Erlewine from Allmusic felt the song was representative of the entire album, picking it as an album highlight. Evan Sawdey from PopMatters, however, disliked the concept of the "Gypsy", saying the "metaphors don't work very well" on the song.

The song was nominated for "Top Latin Song" at the 2011 Billboard Music Awards. Two other songs by Shakira, "Loca" and "Waka Waka (This Time for Africa)", were also nominated, and the award was won by the latter song. At the 2011 Annual Latin Music Awards hosted by ASCAP, Jorge Drexler won an award in the "Pop/Ballad" category for his composition of "Gitana".

== Commercial performance ==
"Gypsy" attained international chart success. In Austria, it entered and peaked at number 11 on the Ö3 Austria Top 40 chart, spending a total of 10 weeks on the chart. In the Dutch-speaking Flanders region of Belgium, the song peaked at number four on the Ultratip chart, spending a total of six weeks on the chart. In the French-speaking Wallonia region of Belgium, the song entered and peaked at number 40 on the Ultratop 50 chart, spending a total of one week on the chart. In Germany, the song peaked at number seven on the Media Control Charts, remaining on the position for one week. In Spain, the song entered the Spanish Singles chart at number 47 and peaked at number three, spending a total of 38 weeks on the chart. "Gypsy" was certified platinum by the Productores de Música de España (PROMUSICAE) for sales of 40,000 units. In Switzerland, the song entered and peaked at number 12 on the Schweizer Hitparade chart, spending a total of 18 weeks on the chart. In Mexico, "Gitana" topped the Monitor Latino chart. It was certified gold by the Asociación Mexicana de Productores de Fonogramas y Videogramas (AMPROFON) after it shipped 30,000 units in the country.

In the United States, "Gypsy" peaked at number 65 on the Billboard Hot 100 chart, spending a total of three weeks on the chart. On the Hot Digital Songs chart, the song peaked at number 48, and remained on the chart for a total of one week. "Gitana" peaked at number six on the US Billboard Hot Latin Songs chart, and stayed on the chart for a total of 20 weeks. On the Latin Pop Airplay chart, the song peaked at number one, and remained on the chart for a total of 25 weeks. On the Tropical Songs chart, the song peaked at number 18, and remained on the chart for a total of 20 weeks. In Canada, the song peaked at number 80 on the Billboard Canadian Hot 100 chart, and remained on it for a total of one week.

== Music video ==
Shakira and Nadal in the music video for "Gypsy".

The accompanying music video for "Gypsy" was directed by Jaume de Laiguana, who had previously worked with Shakira on the videos for songs such as "No". The video stars Spanish professional tennis player Rafael Nadal, who portrays Shakira's love interest in the video. When asked about the reason for starring Nadal in the video, Shakira said she "thought that maybe I needed someone I could in some way identify with. And Rafael Nadal is a person who has been totally committed to his career since he was very young, since he was 17, I believe." The music videos for "Gypsy" and the Spanish-language version "Gitana" were released on 27 February 2010. The video begins with Shakira playing the harmonica, dressed in a black halter top and a long black skirt. The next scenes mainly consist of Shakira interacting with Nadal in different ways, such as dancing for him and laying together on the ground. The video ends with the duo sharing a kiss.

The video received positive reviews from critics. Melanie Bertoldi from Billboard praised Shakira's appearance in the video, saying "the Colombian firebird looks hotter than ever". The HuffPost review of the video labelled it as a "steamy affair". Alek & Steph from OhlalaMag praised the chemistry between Shakira and Nadal, calling it "flirtatious and playful". Jocelyn Vena from MTV praised the video for its "organic vibe" and commented that "while she (Shakira) claims that she's willing to wear her lover's clothes if they fit, she looks much hotter in the sheer black halter top and long black skirt that she sports at one point in the clip". Another review of the video complimented the duo's chemistry and called them both "equally-stunning".

== Live performances ==
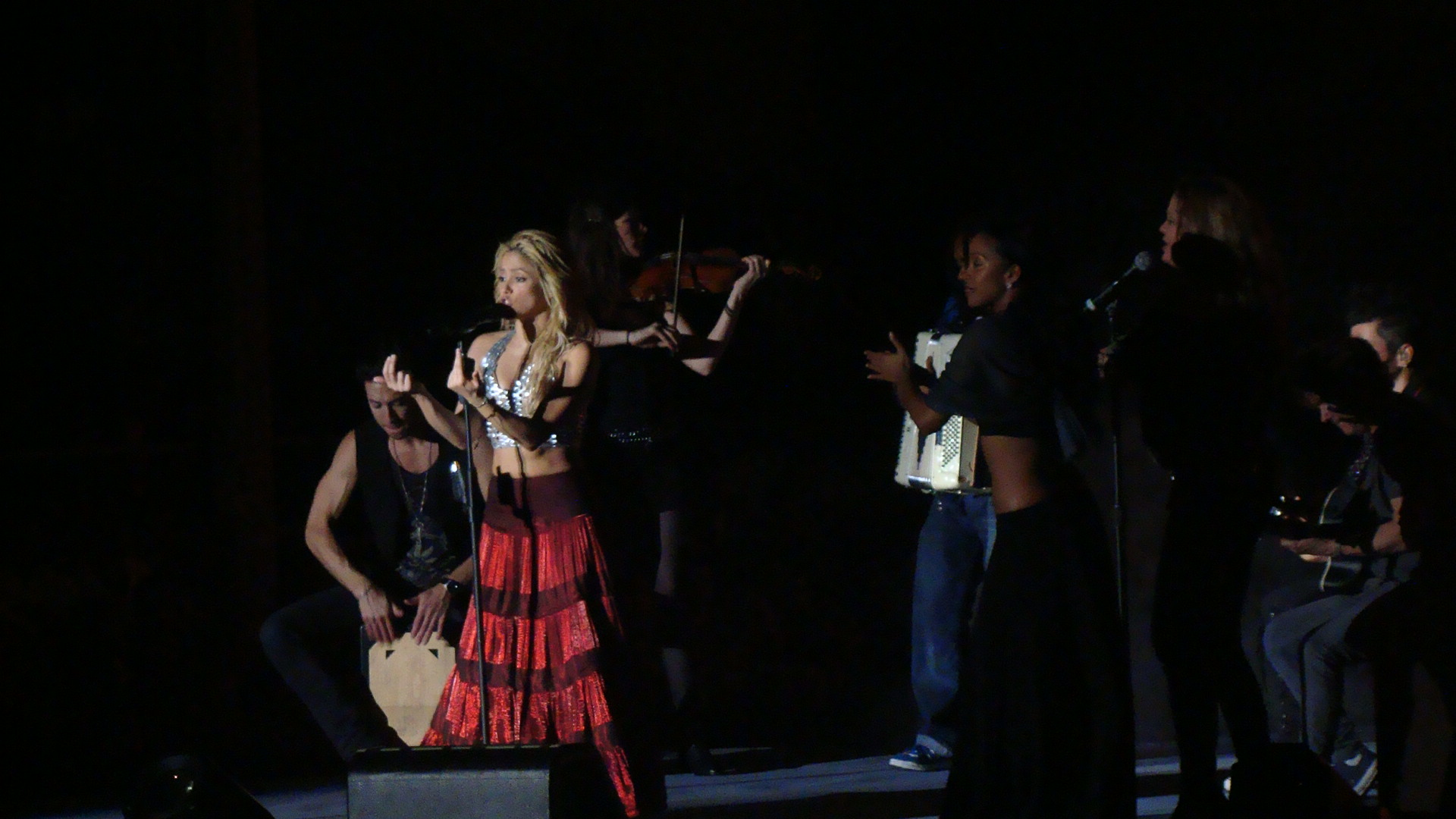
Shakira performing "Gypsy" in Punta del Este, on The Sun Comes Out World Tour

On 29 September 2009, Shakira appeared on the Later... with Jools Holland show to promote her album She Wolf and performed "Gypsy", along with "She Wolf" and "Why Wait". On 16 November, Shakira performed "Gypsy" live on the show The View, accompanied by a tabla and sitar. On 24 November 2009, she performed "Gypsy" on The Rachael Ray Show. On 23 December 2009, she appeared on A Home for the Holidays With Faith Hill to perform the song.

On 27 March 2010, Shakira performed "Gypsy" on the German-language entertainment show Wetten, dass..? in Salzburg, Austria. On 28 April 2010, Shakira performed "Gypsy" on The Ellen DeGeneres Show. The same day, she performed the song as a duet with Rascal Flatts lead-vocalist Gary LeVox on American Idol. Shakira opened and closed the performance while playing the harmonica. Shakira also performed "Gypsy" in Rock in Rio Lisboa and Madrid on 21 May 2010 and 5 June 2010. On 15 July 2010, Shakira performed the song at the opening of the 2010 Premios Juventud awards ceremony, along with her smash hit "Waka Waka (This Time for Africa)". "Gypsy" and "She Wolf" were the only two singles from the album to be included in the setlist of The Sun Comes Out World Tour. The song was performed with a "folk lilt" and Shakira's vocals were backed by "accordion, fiddles and the rhythm section".

== Usage in media ==
Shakira guest-starred as herself in the eighth episode of the season four of Ugly Betty titled "The Bahamas Triangle", which aired on 4 December 2009. The episode featured the songs "Gypsy" and "Give It Up to Me" running in the background. She sang "Gypsy" in a duet with Selena Gomez in the twelfth episode of the season three of Wizards of Waverly Place, titled "Dude Looks Like Shakira". In the episode, the main characters of the show, Alex (Gomez), Justin (David Henrie), and Max (Jake T. Austin), are shocked to find out that Shakira is no one but their Uncle Kelbo (Jeff Garlin), who is abusing one of the magic laws concerning fame and fortune. The episode aired on 16 April 2010.

== Formats and track listings ==
- CD Single ("Gypsy")
1. "Gypsy" – 3:16
2. "Gypsy" (Freemasons Remix) – 3:26
- Digital download ("Gitana")
1. "Gitana" – 3:26
- Digital download EP
1. "Gypsy" – 3:18
2. "Gypsy" (Freemasons Remix) – 3:26
3. "Gypsy" (DMC Radio Mix) – 3:17
4. "Gitana" – 3:26

== Charts ==
=== Weekly charts ===
Weekly chart performance for "Gypsy"
| Chart (2010) | Peak position |
|---|---|
| Austria (Ö3 Austria Top 40) | 11 |
| Belgium (Ultratip Bubbling Under Flanders) | 4 |
| Belgium (Ultratop 50 Wallonia) | 40 |
| Canada Hot 100 (Billboard) | 80 |
| CIS Airplay (TopHit) | 81 |
| Czech Republic Airplay (ČNS IFPI) | 6 |
| Germany (GfK) | 7 |
| Hungary (Rádiós Top 40) | 6 |
| Italy (FIMI) | 14 |
| Mexico (Billboard Ingles Airplay) | 48 |
| Poland Airplay (ZPAV) | 4 |
| Romania Airplay (Media Forest) | 1 |
| Spain (Promusicae) | 3 |
| South Korea (Circle) | 48 |
| Switzerland (Schweizer Hitparade) | 12 |
| US Billboard Hot 100 | 65 |

Weekly chart performance for "Gitana"
| Chart (2010) | Peak position |
|---|---|
| Mexico (Mexico Airplay) | 1 |
| Peru (UNIMPRO) | 18 |
| US Hot Latin Songs (Billboard) | 6 |
| US Latin Pop Airplay (Billboard) | 1 |
| US Latin Digital Song Sales (Billboard) | 1 |

=== Year-end charts ===
Year-end chart performance for "Gypsy"
| Chart (2010) | Position |
|---|---|
| Germany (Official German Charts) | 89 |
| Hungary (Rádiós Top 40) | 39 |
| Italy (FIMI) | 86 |
| Romania (Romanian Top 100) | 33 |
| Spain (PROMUSICAE) | 9 |
| Spanish Airplay (PROMUSICAE) | 11 |

Year-end chart performance for "Gitana"
| Chart (2010) | Position |
|---|---|
| US Hot Latin Songs (Billboard) | 34 |

== Certifications ==
| Region | Certification | Certified units/sales |
|---|---|---|
| Brazil (Pro-Música Brasil) | Gold | 30,000^{‡} |
| Mexico (AMPROFON) English version | Platinum+Gold | 90,000^{‡} |
| Mexico (AMPROFON) Spanish version | Gold | 30,000^{*} |
| Spain (Promusicae) | Platinum | 40,000^{*} |
^{*} Sales figures based on certification alone.^{‡} Sales+streaming figures based on certification alone.

== See also ==
- List of number-one songs of 2010 (Mexico)
- List of number-one Billboard Hot Latin Pop Airplay of 2010
