= Give It Up to Me =

Single by Shakira featuring Lil Wayne

from the album She Wolf
- B-side: "Did It Again"
- Released: 19 October 2009
- Recorded: 2009
- Studio: Sarm Studios (London, England)
- Genre: Synth-pop; hip hop
- Length: 3:03
- Label: Epic
- Songwriters: Shakira; Timothy Mosley; Dwayne Carter; Amanda Ghost; Jerome "J-Roc" Harmon
- Producers: Timbaland; Jerome "J-Roc" Harmon

Shakira singles chronology
"Did It Again" (2009)	"Give It Up to Me" (2009)	"Gypsy" (2010)

Lil Wayne singles chronology
"I Can Transform Ya" (2009)	"Give It Up to Me" (2009)	"I'm Goin' In" (2009)

Music video
- "Give It Up To Me" on YouTube

"Give It Up to Me" is a song by Colombian singer-songwriter Shakira featuring American rapper Lil Wayne, taken from the US deluxe version of the former's eighth studio album She Wolf. It was released on 19 October 2009, by Epic Records as the second single from the album in the US and third overall. The song was written by Shakira, Amanda Ghost, Dwayne Carter and Timbaland. Timbaland also served as the producer of the song. Musically, "Give It Up to Me" is a synthpop and hip hop song that incorporates sexually suggestive lyrics. The song features uncredited vocals from Timbaland.

Upon its release, the song received generally favorable reviews from music critics, who appreciated its production and the collaboration with Lil Wayne and Timbaland. It peaked at number twenty-nine on the US Billboard Hot 100, and was later certified gold by the Recording Industry Association of America (RIAA). Elsewhere, the song attained moderate success in Australia, Canada, Russia, and South Korea. Its accompanying music video was directed by Sophie Muller and premiered on 17 November 2009. It received mixed reviews from critics, who were ambivalent towards its choreography and production.

== Background and composition ==
"Give It Up to Me"
A sample of "Give It Up to Me" by Shakira featuring Lil Wayne, which incorporates prominent elements of synthpop and hip hop.

"Give It Up to Me" was written by Shakira, Amanda Ghost, Lil Wayne, and Timbaland, and was produced by the latter. Timbaland, who produced "Give It Up to Me", initially planned to include the song on his third studio album Shock Value II (2009). He originally served as the featured vocalist, though his verse was replaced by Flo Rida, who himself was later substituted by Lil Wayne. Amanda Ghost, the president of Epic Records, noted that "everyone's breath was blown away" when Lil Wayne expressed interest in appearing on the track. The last-minute collaboration resulted in the delayed release of its parent album She Wolf in the United States. The decision resulted in the creation of a deluxe version of the album available exclusively in the country.

After the respective releases of "She Wolf" and "Did It Again" as the first and second singles from She Wolf, Shakira launched "Give It Up to Me" as the third single from the album. The track incorporates synthpop and hip hop influences with "hand claps" and a "pounding bass". It additionally displays sexually suggestive lyrics, including the lines "put me in a cage and lock me away/and I'll play the games that you want me to play" and "anything you want you can make it yours". The song is composed in the key of F minor with a tempo of 116 beats per minute.

== Reception ==
Upon its release, "Give It Up to Me" received generally favorable reviews from music critics. A reviewer from Billboard complimented the track for displaying Shakira's "signature beat" and her "quirky yet sensual" vocals. Sal Cinquemani from Slant Magazine noted her collaborations with Lil Wayne and Timbaland as an "increasingly cliché but not yet altogether ineffective move", but identified the song as being among the "best moments" showcased on the project. Similarly, Mario Tarradell from The Dallas Morning News recognized the recording as an "insanely catchy, robotic corker", elaborating that it and "She Wolf" were the most radio-friendly songs on the album. However, an editor from The New York Times provided an underwhelming review of the track, suggesting it would disappoint customers who had listened to the previous recording "Loba". In the United States, "Give It Up to Me" peaked at number twenty-nine on the Billboard Hot 100. It additionally reached number twenty-three on the Pop Songs component chart. It was later certified gold by the Recording Industry Association of America (RIAA) for digital downloads of 500,000 copies. Internationally, the track achieved moderate commercial success. It reached number thirty-two on the Canadian Hot 100, and additionally peaked at number thirty-five on the Australian Singles Chart. It peaked at number 5 on the Deutsche Black Charts.

== Music video and promotion ==
The accompanying music video for "Give It Up to Me" was directed by Sophie Muller. On 13 November 2009, People provided an exclusive first look of the project. The full clip premiered the following day through Vevo. Throughout the clip, scenes of Shakira and Lil Wayne are interspersed between the choreography. It begins as the latter raps his verse, while the former begins her routine with a group of female dancers. During the bridge, Shakira portrays Senju Kannon, the goddess of 1,000 hands and is seen wearing a blue dress and a gold-colored spiked crown with the background of Hong Kong's Victoria Harbour. The video concludes as she continues to dance with the women.

James Montgomery from MTV News noted that it shared similarities with the music video for "Single Ladies (Put a Ring on It)" by Beyoncé Knowles, highlighting a similar wardrobe and dance routine. He complimented the inclusion of Lil Wayne, and added that Shakira "really is a true original". A review from Neon Limelight was less complimentary of the clip, opining that the "switch from sexy Latin hip rolls to street stepper" was a sign of "desperation". They also noted similarities to the music video for "Promiscuous" by Nelly Furtado. Shakira additionally promoted the single through her performance at the American Music Awards of 2009. On 14 February 2010, Shakira performed "She Wolf" and "Give It Up to Me" at the 2010 NBA All-Star Game halftime-show.

== Track listings ==
- Digital download
1. "Give It Up to Me" featuring Lil Wayne – 3:03
- European maxi single / Australia digital download bundle EP
1. "Give It Up to Me" featuring Lil Wayne – 3:03
2. "Did It Again" featuring Kid Cudi (Benassi Remix) – 5:58
3. "Did It Again" featuring Kid Cudi (Superchumbo Remix) – 7:41

== Charts ==
Chart (2009)	Peak position
Australian Physical Singles Chart	35
Canada Hot 100 (Billboard)	32
Canada CHR/Top 40 (Billboard)	17
CIS Airplay (TopHit)	190
South Korea (Circle)	39
US Billboard Hot 100	29
US Pop Airplay (Billboard)	23
US Rhythmic Airplay (Billboard)	28

== Certifications ==
Region	Certification	Certified units/sales
United States (RIAA)	Gold	500,000^{*}
^{*} Sales figures based on certification alone.

== Release history ==
Region	Date	Format	Label
United States	19 October 2009	Mainstream and Rhythm Crossover radio	Epic Records
United States	26 October 2009	Digital download	Epic Records
Australia	29 January 2010	CD single	Sony Music Australia
