= Did It Again (Shakira song) =

Single by Shakira

from the album She Wolf
- Released: 16 October 2009
- Recorded: 2009
- Studio: Compass Point Studios (Nassau, Bahamas)
- Genre: Electropop
- Length: 3:12
- Label: Epic
- Songwriters: Shakira; Pharrell Williams
- Producers: Shakira; The Neptunes

Shakira singles chronology
"She Wolf" (2009)	"Did It Again" (2009)	"Give It Up to Me" (2009)

Music videos
- "Did It Again" on YouTube; "Lo Hecho Está Hecho" on YouTube

"Did It Again" is a song by Colombian singer Shakira from her eighth studio album, She Wolf (2009). The song was written by Shakira, with production from The Neptunes. There is an alternate version featuring vocals from American rapper Kid Cudi, while its Spanish-language version "Lo Hecho Está Hecho" (English: "What Is Done Is Done") includes additional lyrical contributions from Uruguayan musician Jorge Drexler. "Did It Again" is an electropop song with elements of samba. Lyrically, it details Shakira's involvement in a man's extramarital affair, which leads to her feeling guilty and hurt about it.

In the UK and most European countries, the song was released on 16 October 2009 as the second single from the album. Upon its release, "Did It Again" was well received by music critics, many of whom complimented its lyrical content. Commercially, the song attained moderate success. It peaked within the top twenty in nations including Spain, where it was certified gold, and Italy. In the United States, "Did It Again" peaked at number one on the US Billboard Hot Dance Club Songs chart and Latin Pop Airplay chart, and at numbers six and 11 on the US Billboard Hot Latin Songs chart and Tropical Songs chart, respectively. An accompanying music video for "Did It Again" was directed by Sophie Muller, and features Shakira fighting a man in a bedroom. It generated a favorable response from critics and was complimented for its dance scenes. For additional promotion, Shakira performed "Did It Again" on a number of television shows.

== Background and composition ==
"Did It Again"
A 19 second sample of the song containing its chorus and part of the hook, which some music critics compared to the one in Rihanna's song "Umbrella".

After the release of "She Wolf", "Did It Again" was serviced as the next single from the album She Wolf, (2009), and is the second single overall. "Did It Again" was written by Shakira and Pharrell Williams, and is one of the four tracks on the album Shakira co-produced with The Neptunes, the others being "Long Time", "Why Wait", and "Good Stuff". About her collaboration with Williams, Shakira commented, "he comes up with ideas, and he executes them immediately. It's really cool, because I'm a little bit slower, and he's the man with the big strokes, and he really comes with great ideas. It was a great synergy". A Spanish version of the song, titled "Lo Hecho Está Hecho" was also released and features additional songwriting by Jorge Drexler. Musically, "Did It Again" is a midtempo electropop song that contains elements of samba. The lyrics of the song are confessional in nature and express Shakira's growing guilt over the fact that she is in a sexual affair with a married man, and her inability to end it, hence the title "Did It Again".

Both the English and Spanish versions of the song were internationally released on 16 October 2009. The single was not officially released in the US market, where it was substituted by "Give It Up to Me", the third single off the album. A remix of the English version of the song, featuring additional vocals from Kid Cudi, was later released on 11 December 2009. Cudi's contribution to the song consisted of a rap verse halfway through the song where he "raps about bringing good vibes to Shakira's life".

== Critical reception ==
"Did It Again" was well received by music critics. Fraser McAlpine from BBC, praised the lyrics of the song, and complimented Shakira's unpredictability and expressivity. Evan Sawdey from PopMatters commended the song's production and labelled Shakira' songwriting skills as her "strongest suit". The Popjustice review of the album described the song as being "brilliant", and noted it to be a good choice for a single. Lahmeik Stacy from Yahoo! Voices commented on the fast-paced musical arrangement of the song, saying that it "immediately demands the attention of the listener". Anthony Balderrama from Consequence of Sound, singled out "Did It Again" as one of the strongest tracks on the album, along with "She Wolf" and "Why Wait", and also as a good choice for creating a Spanish version. Stephen Erlewine from AllMusic picked the song as an album highlight.

At the 19th Annual Latin Music Awards hosted by the American Society of Composers, Authors and Publishers, Drexler and Williams won an award in the "Pop/Ballad" category for their composition of the song. The Spanish version "Lo Hecho Está Hecho" was acknowledged as an award-winning song at the 2011 BMI Latin Awards. The Spanish version also received a nomination for "Canción del Año" ("Song of the Year") in the Pop Category at the Premio Lo Nuestro 2011 awards ceremony.

== Commercial performance ==
"Did It Again" achieved moderate chart success. In Austria, the song debuted and peaked at number 34 on the Ö3 Austria Top 40 chart, staying on the chart for four weeks. In Germany, the song peaked at number 34 on the Media Control Charts and remained at the position for one week. In Ireland, the song peaked at number 17 on the Irish Singles Chart and stayed on the chart for three weeks. In Italy, the song entered and peaked at number 15, inside the Top 20 of the FIMI Singles Chart, staying on the chart for one week. In Mexico, the Spanish version of the song peaked at number three on the Monitor Latino chart. "Lo Hecho Está Hecho" entered the Spanish Singles Top 50 chart at number 50 and reached its peak position at number 12, staying on the chart for a total of 23 weeks. It was certified gold by the Productores de Música de España (PROMUSICAE) for completing sales of 20,000 units. In Sweden, the song entered at number 50 on the Sverigetopplistan chart and peaked at number 36, staying on the chart for a total of three weeks. In Switzerland, the song entered and peaked at number 29 on the Swiss Hitparade chart, staying on the chart for six weeks. In the United Kingdom, the song peaked at number 26 on the UK Singles Chart and stayed on the chart for a total of seven weeks.

Despite not being released as a single in the United States, "Did It Again" peaked at number one on the Billboard Hot Dance Club Songs and Latin Pop Airplay component charts, and stayed on the charts for 13 and 22 weeks respectively. The song peaked at number six on the Billboard Hot Latin Songs chart and stayed on the chart for 20 weeks. It peaked at number 11 on the Billboard Tropical Songs chart and stayed on the chart for 17 weeks.

== Music video ==
Shakira laying in a bedroom in the music video, where she engages in combat with her partner.

The music video for "Did It Again" was filmed in September 2009 and was directed by Sophie Muller, who had previously worked with Shakira on the music video for "Hips Don't Lie" (2006). Shakira cited the paintings of British painter Lawrence Alma-Tadema, which detailed scenes of women in Turkish bathrooms, as an inspiration behind the video. After Shakira was introduced to a contemporary Icelandic dance form by a friend, she and Muller enlisted Icelandic choreographer Katrin Hall to choreograph the dance sequences in the video. When asked of the inspiration behind the music video for "Did It Again", Shakira said that she and Muller "brought all these pieces — Moroccan women twirling and turning their heads, and the poetry from Alma-Tadema's paintings, plus this Icelandic contemporary dance piece — and we mixed all these pieces together for the video."

The videos for both the original English version and the Spanish translation were released on 30 October 2009. A video for the remix version of the song, featuring American rapper Kid Cudi, debuted later in December 2009. The video starts with Shakira sitting in a steam filled bath house surrounded by other women facing her, all clad in white. The next scene shows a group of female Korean drummers performing the Korean "Three Drum Dance". Shakira appears in a bedroom wearing black lingerie and begins fighting her partner (played by dancer Daniel "Cloud" Campos) in a martial arts-inspired dance routine and ultimately manages to defeat him. Scenes of Shakira dancing wearing a black and golden outfit follow. Near the end of the video, all the previous scenes are rapidly interspersed. The version featuring Kid Cudi, features additional scenes of the rapper in a room.

The music video received generally positive reviews from critics. Tanner Stransky from Entertainment Weekly reviewed the video positively, and said it was a "fun feat to watch her [Shakira] pull off". Story Gilmore from Neon Limelight called the fight between Shakira and her partner an "angry yet passion filled tussle" and the video a "smoking hot winner". Elena Gorgan from Softpedia, praised Shakira's dance moves and noted that she "comes very close to perfection in terms of artistic dancing". Jocelyn Vena of MTV News noted that Shakira was "dancing around being sexy" in the video. Olivia Smith from the Daily News described the dance choreography as "highly athletic", but criticized the design of the hotel room where the video was filmed.

== Live performances ==
Shakira made an appearance on 18 September episode of Jimmy Kimmel Live! and performed "Did It Again", along with "She Wolf". Shakira performed the song on the US version of Dancing with the Stars on 13 October, and on Saturday Night Live on 18 October. In both the performances, Shakira was backed by female Korean drummers, who were also present in the music video of the song. The song was also performed by Shakira at the 2009 MTV Europe Music Awards. On 15 November, she performed the song on the UK version of The X Factor.

== Track listings ==
Digital download (English version)

1. "Did It Again" – 3:12

Digital download (Spanish version)

1. "Lo Hecho Está Hecho" – 3:12

CD single (English version)

1. "Did It Again" (Album Version) – 3:12
2. "Did It Again" (featuring Kid Cudi) (Benassi Remix) – 5:55

Digital EP

1. "Did It Again" – 3:12
2. "Did It Again" (featuring Kid Cudi) (Benassi Remix) – 5:55
3. "Lo Hecho Está Hecho" (featuring Pitbull) – 4:24
4. "Did It Again" (Video) – 3:29

== Charts ==
=== Weekly charts ===
2009–2010 weekly chart performance for "Did It Again"
Chart	Peak position
Austria (Ö3 Austria Top 40)	34
Belgium (Ultratip Bubbling Under Flanders)	3
CIS Airplay (TopHit)	117
Finland Download (Latauslista)	27
Germany (GfK)	34
Global Dance Songs (Billboard)	18
Ireland (IRMA)	17
Italy (FIMI)	15
Slovakia Airplay (ČNS IFPI)	18
Sweden (Sverigetopplistan)	36
Switzerland (Schweizer Hitparade)	29
UK Singles (Official Charts)	26
Ukraine Airplay (TopHit)	181
US Bubbling Under Hot 100 (Billboard)	5
US Dance Club Songs (Billboard)	1

2009–2010 weekly chart performance for "Lo Hecho Está Hecho"
Chart	Peak position
El Salvador (EFE)	7
Mexico (Monitor Latino)	3
Mexico (Mexico Airplay)	4
Panama (EFE)	2
Peru (UNIMPRO)	8
Spain (Promusicae)	12
US Hot Latin Songs (Billboard)	6
US Latin Pop Airplay (Billboard)	1
US Latin Digital Song Sales (Billboard)	4

=== Year-end charts ===
2010 year-end chart performance for "Did It Again"
Chart	Position
US Dance Club Songs (Billboard)	45
US Hot Latin Songs (Billboard)	32

== Certifications ==
Certifications and sales for "Did It Again"
Region	Certification	Certified units/sales
Mexico (AMPROFON)	2× Platinum	120,000^{‡}
Mexico (AMPROFON) certification for "Lo Hecho Está Hecho"	2× Platinum+Gold	150,000^{‡}
Spain (Promusicae)	Gold	20,000^{*}
^{*} Sales figures based on certification alone.^{‡} Sales+streaming figures based on certification alone.

== Release history ==
Release dates and formats for "Did It Again"
Region	Date	Format(s)	Version(s)	Label(s)	Ref.
Spain	16 October 2009	Digital download	"Lo Hecho Está Hecho"	Sony Music	
United Kingdom	16 October 2009	Digital download	"Did It Again"	RCA	
Germany	27 November 2009	CD	"Did It Again"	Sony Music	
United Kingdom	14 December 2009	CD	"Did It Again"	RCA	
United Kingdom	14 December 2009	Digital download (EP)	Remixes	RCA	

== See also ==
- List of number-one dance singles of 2010 (U.S.)
- List of number-one Billboard Hot Latin Pop Airplay of 2010
