= The Sun Comes Out World Tour =

2010–2011 concert tour by Shakira

- World tour by Shakira
- Location: Asia; Europe; Latin America; North America
- Associated album: She Wolf; Sale el Sol
- Start date: 15 September 2010
- End date: 15 October 2011
- No. of shows: 106

Shakira concert chronology
- Oral Fixation Tour (2006–2007); The Sun Comes Out World Tour (2010–2011); El Dorado World Tour (2018)

The Sun Comes Out World Tour (also known as the Sale el Sol World Tour) was the fifth concert tour by Colombian singer Shakira, launched in support of her eighth and ninth studio albums, She Wolf (2009) and Sale El Sol (2010). After a special tour preview-show, held in Montreal, Quebec on 15 September 2010, the North American leg of the tour commenced in Uncasville, Connecticut on 17 September, finishing in Rosemont, Illinois (Chicago) on 29 October 2010. The European leg of the tour was then planned to begin in the city of Lyon, France on 16 November, and end in London, England on 20 December 2010.

The tickets for the initial European shows were soon sold out, and Shakira extended the tour into 2011, announcing a show in Paris, France. Additionally, the tour would visit new markets and countries for Shakira, performing in places such as her father's homeland of Lebanon, as well as UAE, Belarus, Ukraine, Hungary, Serbia, and Moscow and Saint Petersburg, Russia, to name a few. Further dates in Spain, Italy, Germany, the United Kingdom, Portugal and Switzerland were also added.

The Latin American leg of the tour was a part of the South American Pop Festival circuit, stopping in many cities across Argentina, Bolivia, Brazil, Chile, Costa Rica, Dominican Republic, Guatemala, Mexico, Panama, Paraguay, Peru, Puerto Rico, Uruguay and Venezuela, as well as Shakira’s home country, Colombia. The tour concluded at the José Miguel Agrelot Coliseum in San Juan on 15 October 2011.

The setlist of the tour was composed of songs chosen, primarily, from Shakira's ninth studio album, Sale el Sol; the rest were from her various studio albums. The stage was shaped like the letter "T", with a catwalk extending from the stage into the center-floor section of the audience, to enable the best views of Shakira and her band/dancers; several dance and musical numbers were performed utilizing the catwalk as a stage, with spectators in those areas getting up-close views and interactions with Shakira. A large screen was set behind the stage, on which various visuals were displayed, as well as high-definition live video, for those seated farther away.

For the bulk of the shows, Shakira kept clothing simple, mainly wearing a mesh gold crop-top with tight leather pants or jeans, and frequently performing without shoes. Other small costume changes Shakira had during the shows included a hooded pink gown, a golden bejeweled 'bellydancing' dress and bikini top (for "Ojos Así"), a flamenco skirt, and a feathery blue dress.

The shows were very well-received by critics, many of whom praised the charisma and energy which Shakira displayed during the performances. Commercially, the tour was a success. It ranked at number 40 on Pollstar's 2010 year-end "Top 50 North American Tours" list as it grossed a total of $16.9 million in the continent, with total ticket sales numbering 205,371. In 2011, the tour ranked at number 20 on Pollstar's 2011 "Top 25 Worldwide Tours" with a total gross of $53.2 million and ticket sales numbering 629,064. It brought in a total of $70.1 million gross and 834,435 tickets sold. A live album of the show (held at the Palais Omnisports de Paris-Bercy in Paris, France in June 2011) was released as Shakira: Live from Paris, on 5 December 2011.

== Background ==
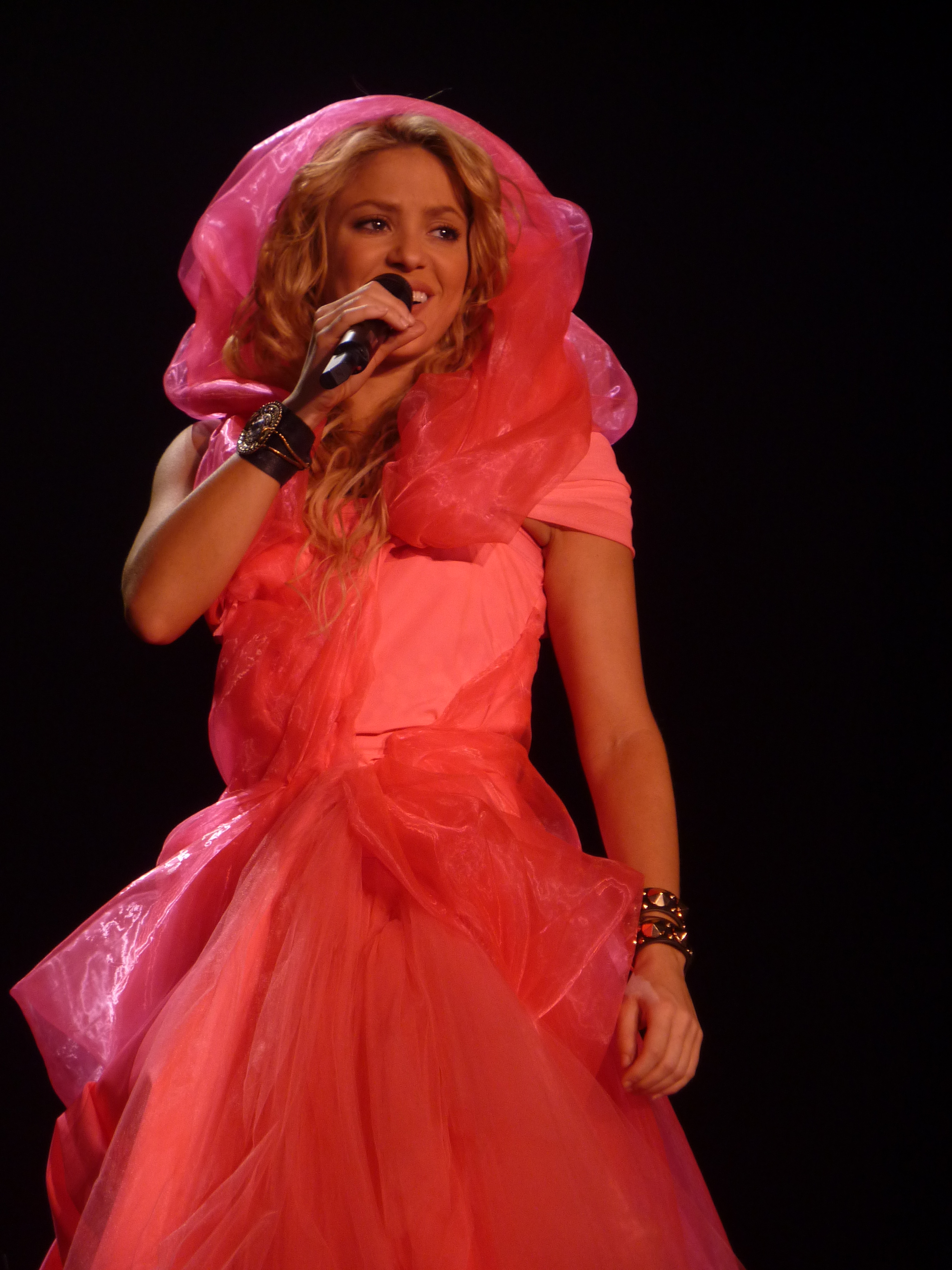
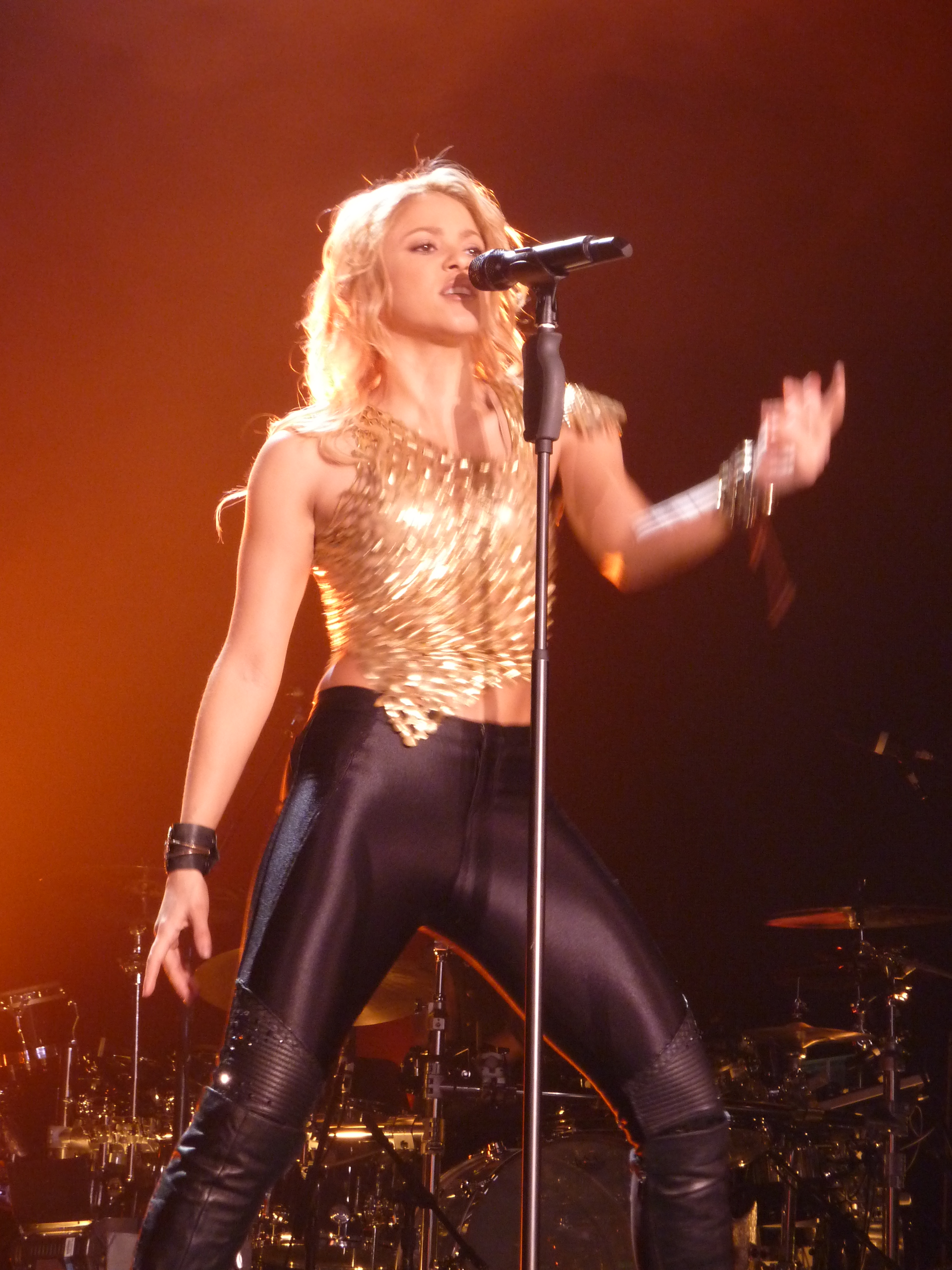
Shakira began the show in Paris with a hooded fuchsia gown (left), which she later threw off to reveal a mesh gold crop top coupled with skin-tight leather pants (right).

On 3 May 2010, Shakira's official website announced dates for the North American leg of the then-unnamed global tour. Three dates and locations were confirmed in the announcement: the tour would appear in Madison Square Garden in New York City, on 21 September, Toyota Center in Houston, on 8 October, and Staples Center in Los Angeles, on 23 October. Following a pre-sale period, the tickets for the three locations were made available for public purchase on 7 May, on Shakira's official website. By 23 August, 19 new tour dates and locations were added to the initial ones, summing the total count of the 2010 North American shows to 22. It was also announced that a special tour preview show would be held in Montreal, Quebec, Canada, on 15 September, to offer fans "an exclusive look at Shakira's worldwide arena tour", prior to the tour's official commencement in Uncasville, Connecticut, on 17 September. The last location for the tour to touch upon was Rosemont, Illinois, on 29 October.

On 28 June, Shakira announced the dates for the European leg of the tour. 22 dates and locations were announced in total and the tour would begin at the Halle Tony Garnier concert hall in Lyon, on 16 November, and end at the O2 Arena in London, on 20 December. Notable locations the tour would appear in were the Palais Omnisports de Paris-Bercy in Paris, the Festhalle Frankfurt in Frankfurt, the Manchester Arena in Manchester and The O2 in Dublin. After the tickets of the European leg of the tour were sold-out, Shakira extended the tour into 2011 and announced a show to be held at the Palais Omnisports de Paris-Bercy in Paris, on 14 June. Later, Shakira decided to add another date to the Paris show of the tour and set 13 June to perform at the Palais Omnisports de Paris-Bercy. By 15 March, new tour dates were added at locations such as Croatia, Russia, Spain and Switzerland.

On 3 December, the Latin America dates of the tour were announced. The first date of the tour was decided to be held on 1 March in Salta, Argentina. Other locations the tour would touch upon included Bogotá in Shakira's native country Colombia, San José in Costa Rica, Mexico City in Mexico, and São Paulo in Brazil. The final date for the Latin American leg of the tour was scheduled to be held on 12 April, in Panama.

The name of the tour was initially speculated to be "Tour of Earthly Delights", until Shakira's official website revealed the poster of the tour on 8 September, which highlighted "The Sun Comes Out World Tour" as the name. The poster of the tour features Shakira jumping in the air wearing a golden bikini top coupled with golden pants, similar to the cover art of her 2010 single "Loca". The tour was launched to promote Shakira's eighth studio album She Wolf, which was released in October 2009, and her ninth studio album Sale el Sol, which was set to release on 19 October 2010. The words "Sale el Sol" are Spanish for "The Sun Comes Out", hence the tour was also referred to as the Sale el Sol World Tour.

== Development ==
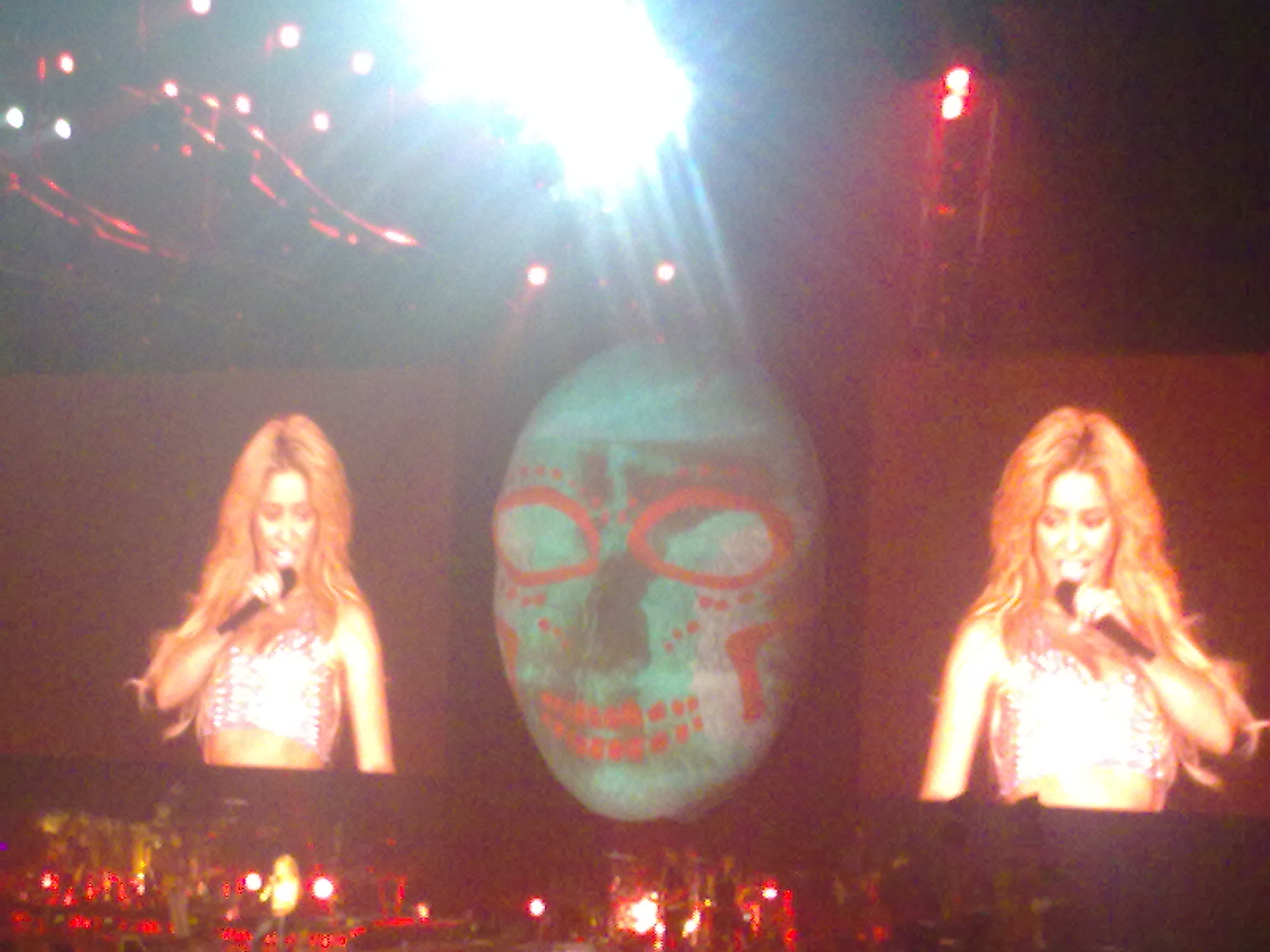
Shakira performed "Gordita" in her Manchester show. An animated face of Residente, the lead singer of Puerto Rican band Calle 13 and a featured artist on the song, was projected onto the screen during his portions of the song. Such sequences were designed by entertainment branding agency Loyalkaspar. The guest singer showed up in Shakira's shows in Los Angeles, Cordoba and San Juan.

In 2008, Shakira signed a 10-year deal with international touring giant Live Nation, which prompted Forbes to deem her as the fourth highest earning female musician in history. The Sun Comes Out World Tour was her first tour to be promoted by Live Nation. The Latin American leg of the tour was part of Pop Festival, a "brand new festival that will bring international music stars to Latin America, and which will also showcase the latest in contemporary art and technology". According to Valentina España, senior managing editor of Terra.com, the production budget of the tour was big enough to "put Britney's Circus (Tour) to shame". Shakira talked about the tour, saying:

"It's going to have themes and there'll be a lot of audience interaction. My live show will have a lot of that — a lot of dancing, a joie de vivre. I feel such freedom on stage. It's such a rush to be performing. I like to see everybody's faces on stage, to see the reaction. Normally, you can only see the front row because of the lights. So you'll see a lot of (my) energy... but there are also going to be other moments that I hope are artistically energetic. I want people to feel things up close"

On 27 November 2009, it was revealed that Shakira was conducting auditions to choose a different opening act for each of the tour's appearances in different cities. The acts willing to audition were required to upload videos of their performances to Shakira's official website. Fans were allowed to vote for their favourite acts and the ones with the most would proceed to the finals; Shakira and her team would then pick the winner out of them. The visuals and conceptual video scenes for the tour were managed and designed by entertainment branding agency Loyalkaspar, who had previously designed tour visuals for artists like U2 and Jay-Z. Elliott Chaffer, the creative director of the agency, talked about the project, saying that "Shakira was a much bigger undertaking then anything we've attempted previously. They were looking for original content that had to work over two LED screens and on a huge projector mapping surreal models of an ever-changing animated face, all in just three weeks. This is for her global world tour, so modifications to the setlist and track durations continued through nine rounds of revisions". The visuals were projected onto the large screen set behind the stage. The stage was shaped in the form of the letter "T" to enable a maximum number of viewers to see Shakira.

== Concert synopsis ==
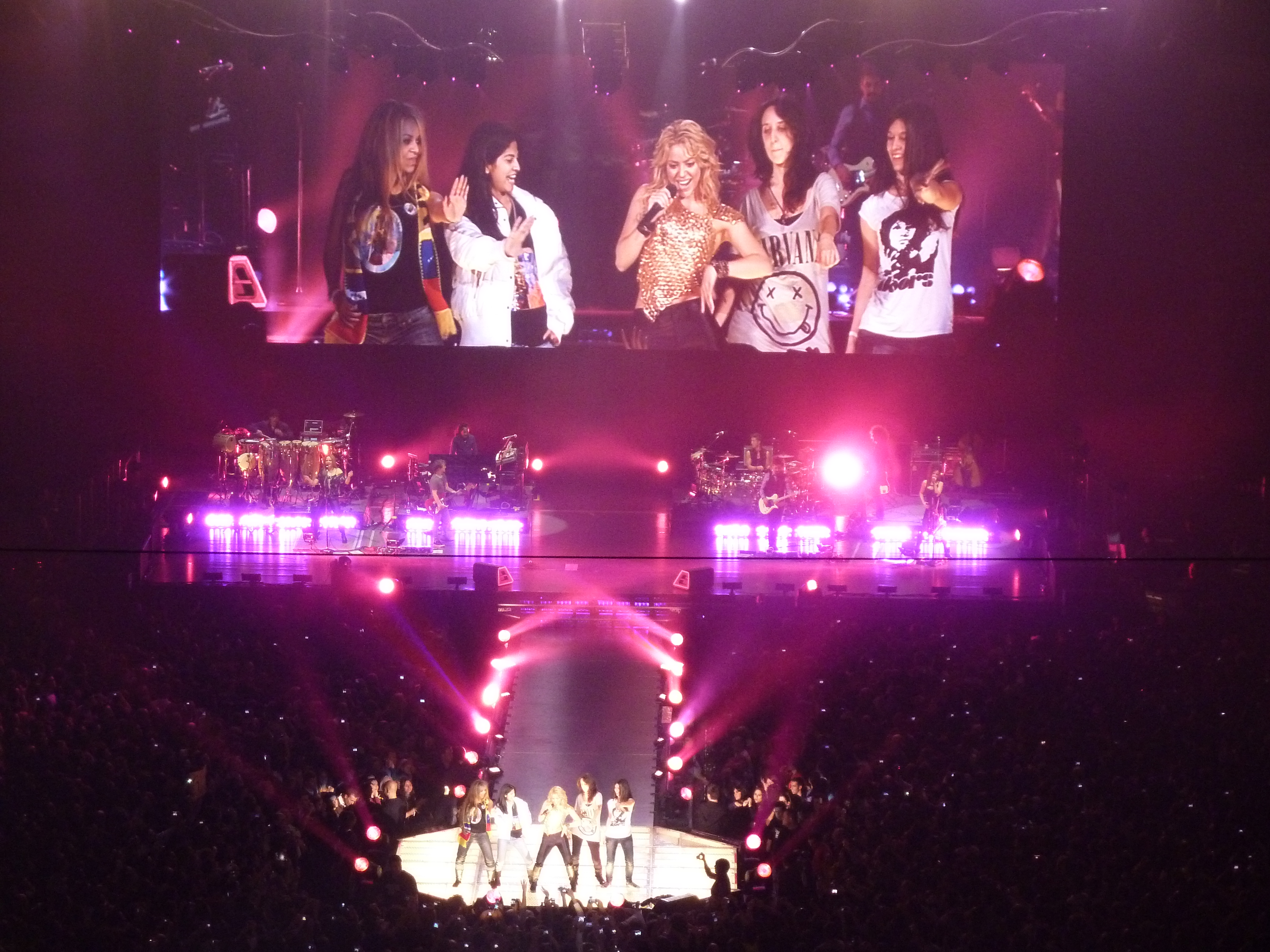
Shakira on stage in Madrid. During the performance of "Whenever, Wherever", Shakira invited four female fans onto the stage and taught them how to belly dance.

The concert began with the lights dimming and a sole spotlight being focused on the crowd. The spotlight then followed Shakira as she entered the hall wearing a hooded fuchsia gown. Singing the "pensive" and "sentimental" ballad "Pienso En Tí" ("I Think of You"), she began walking towards the stage while shaking her fans' hands and hugging them. As soon as Shakira climbed the stage, she threw off the gown to reveal her main attire: a mesh gold crop top coupled with skin-tight leather pants. A more energetic routine followed as she "sprinted, jumped, and yodelled" across the stage while performing more guitar-oriented versions of "Why Wait" and "Te Dejo Madrid" ("I Leave You Madrid"). After stopping to play a harmonica solo, Shakira performed "Si Te Vas" ("If You Go") accompanied by "dense" musical instrumentation. This was followed by a more rock-tinged performance of "Whenever, Wherever", during which Shakira invited four female fans onto the stage and taught them how to belly dance.

The band moved to a small platform in the middle of the hall and Shakira came onto the stage after changing into a wine red-coloured flamenco skirt. A short set of acoustic songs followed, beginning with a cover of "Nothing Else Matters", a ballad by American heavy metal band Metallica. According to Jon Parales from The New York Times, the cover of the song "made it sound Andean, with six-beat drumming and the strumming of a ukulele-sized charango". The cover was blended straight into a performance of "Despedida" ("Farewell"), a song recorded by Shakira for the soundtrack of the 2007 film Love in the Time of Cholera, during which she "tested" her band drummer's musical skill by "incorporating him into her moves". "Gypsy" was performed with a "folk lilt" and Shakira's vocals were backed by "accordion, fiddles and the rhythm section". The segment was closed with a performance of "La Tortura" ("Torture").

The mariachi-influenced "Ciega, Sordomuda" ("Blind, Deaf, and Dumb") was performed using a Stroh violin, which was used to replace the horn sections of the original recording. David Hardwick from SpinningPlatters.com said the use of the instrument was "impressive". She then sang the power ballad "Underneath Your Clothes". A large animated face resembling that of Residente, the lead singer of Puerto Rican band Calle 13, was projected onto the screen behind the stage during the performance of "Gordita" ("Chubby"), a hip hop and rap track in which the artist was featured. The face was used to cover Residente's portions of the song through prerecorded vocals. Shakira then sang the "Sale el Sol," a song which was originally said to be dedicated to Argentine musician Gustavo Cerati, Shakira's close friend and frequent collaborator, who had been in a coma. Shakira then changed into a pair of neon leopard-print pants and performed "Loca" ("Crazy") with more "intricate and urban choreographies". Shakira then let out a long howl, signaling the start of the performance of "She Wolf". The performances of "Loca" and "She Wolf" marked the first time back-up dancers were featured in the show. Dave Simpson from The Guardian commented that Shakira was "howling like a banshee" during the performance. The performance of the Middle Eastern music-flavoured "Ojos Así" ("Eyes Like Yours") was the final one on the setlist of the concert. Shakira incorporated belly dancing steps into her choreography during the performance.

The encore segment of the concert began with a performance of "Antes de las Seis" ("Before Six O'clock"), during which artificial snow was launched into the air as the song neared its end. The keyboardist of the concert band impersonated Haitian-American rapper Wyclef Jean, the featured artist on Shakira's hit single "Hips Don't Lie" during the performance of the song. The concert show ended with the performance of "Waka Waka (This Time for Africa)", the worldwide hit Shakira recorded as the official anthem song of the 2010 FIFA World Cup, during which she again invited fans onto the stage to dance with her as confetti "filled the entire arena".

== Critical response ==
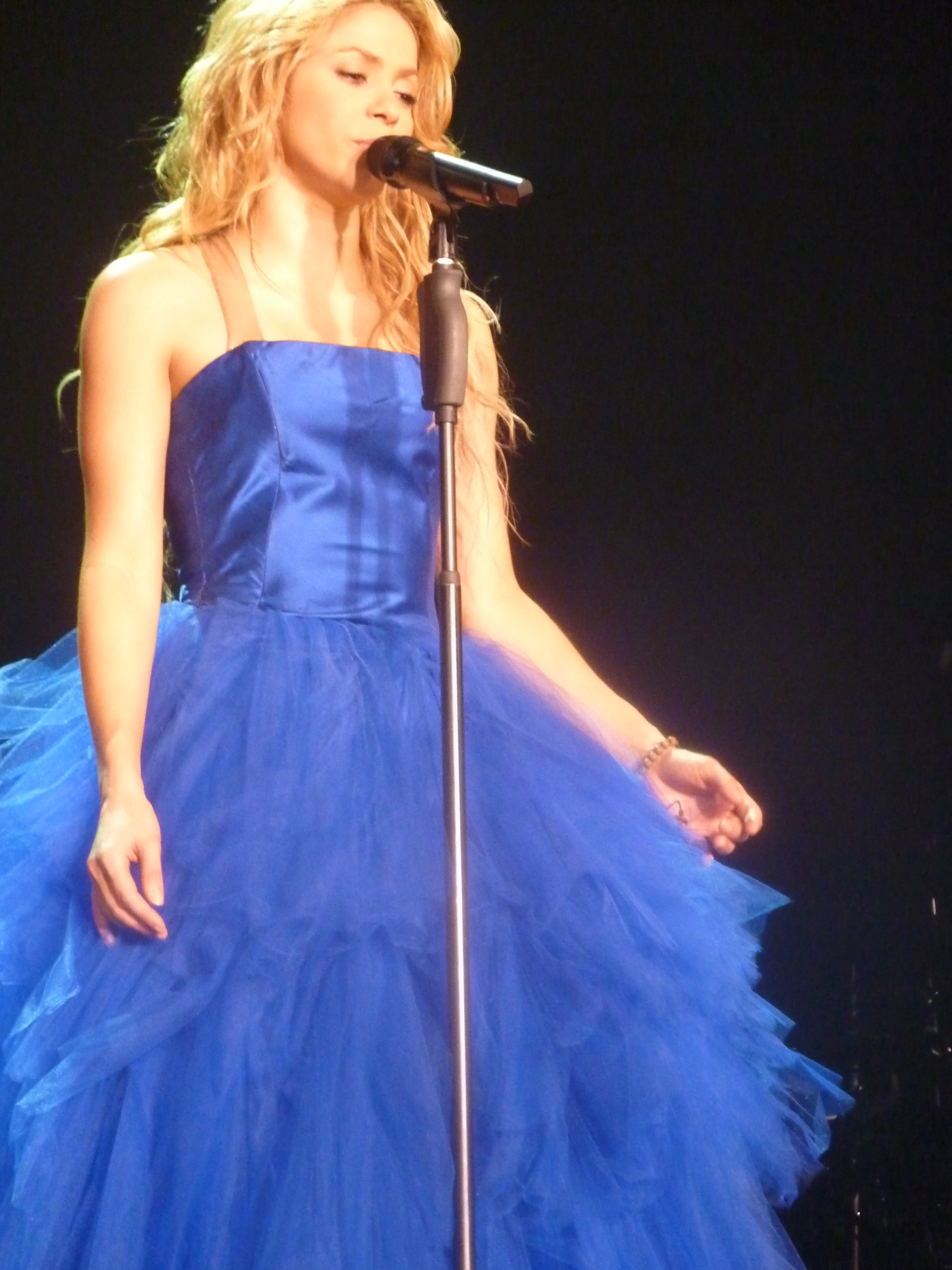
Shakira wore a "feathery blue dress" during the performance of "Antes de las Seis".

The tour received numerous positive reviews from critics. Terry Mathews from The Sulphur Springs News-Telegram, in his review of the concert held at the American Airlines Center in Dallas, opined that the show was "equally enormous and bombastic as it was intimate" and that there was a "joyful atmosphere after the show", which proved that Shakira "had done her job". However, she also felt that the "fast paced, familiar tracks" of She Wolf should have been included more on the setlist rather than the "still unknown singles" of Sale el Sol. Mikael Wood from the Los Angeles Times, in his review of the concert held at the Staples Center in Los Angeles, also complimented Shakira's charisma and praised her for not going over the top, instead noting that she was "carrying out a plan, skillfully and with no shortage of superstar charisma". Dakin Hardwick from SpinningPlatters.com, in his review of the concert held at the Oracle Arena in Oakland, praised Shakira's interaction with the fans and called her "truly one of the great performers", commenting that "the woman simply will not stop dancing".

Jim Farber from New York Daily News, in his review of the concert held at Madison Square Garden in New York, felt that Shakira's voice lacked sensuality and that it "displayed a clucky, burpy style". However, he also said that her energetic live performance and ability to dance "smoothed out her rougher elements", and that she "whipped up the kind of charisma that doesn't need to come from any particular place to charm". Jon Pareles from The New York Times, in his review of the concert held at Madison Square Garden in New York, praised Shakira's multi-cultural approach during the show and called it "globalization" with "pure positive thinking" and Shakira a "star with a conscience". Mick Stingley from The Hollywood Reporter, in his review of the concert held at Madison Square Garden in New York, said that the show "cemented Shakira's place as an arena-rock star", and concluded that the concert was an "effervescent message of love from a world music diva with dance fever".

Tim Burrows from The Telegraph, in his review of the concert held at the O2 Arena in London, complimented Shakira's charisma during the show and her ability to make sure that the "crowd still left glowing", saying that it was the product of a "masterclass in cold calculation". Dave Simpson from The Guardian, in his review of the concert held at the Manchester Arena in Manchester, favoured Shakira's charisma and bold sexuality, noting that it is "upfront and yet nowhere near as overt as a Christina Aguilera or Madonna". He described Shakira's approach towards the performances during the show, saying that she "gives everything to the performance while revealing nothing", and that she appears to be "simultaneously like a hyperintelligent pop mastermind and an overawed little girl having tremendous fun".

== Commercial reception ==
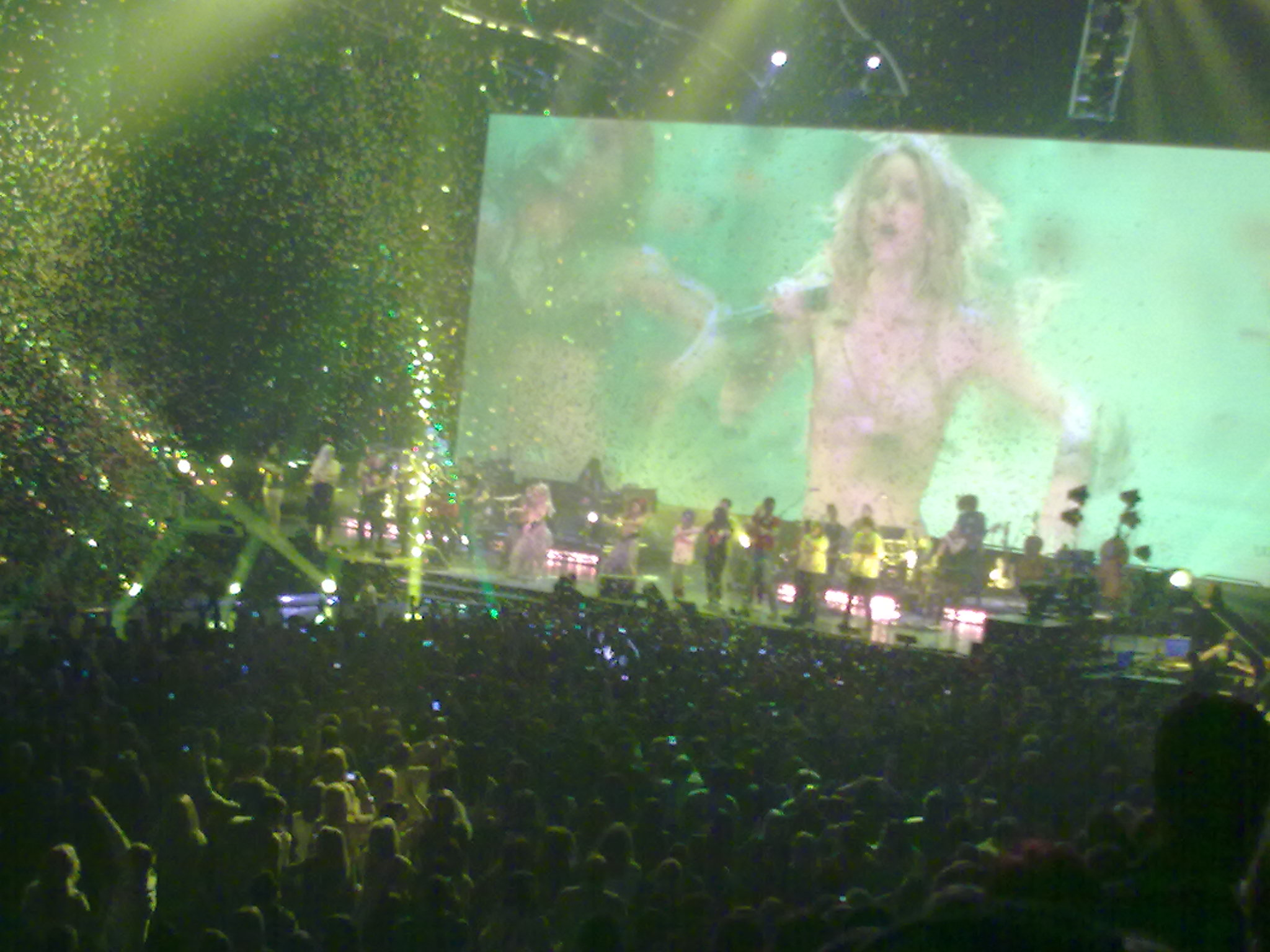
The shows closed with a lively performance of Shakira’s World Cup hit "Waka Waka (This Time for Africa)", during which large amounts of confetti were thrown into the air.

During the North American dates, from 21 September to 23 October 2010, the tour grossed $3,685,377 and ranked fourth on Billboard’s Hot Tours chart, dated 11 November 2010. The shows at Madison Square Garden in New York and the Staples Center in Los Angeles were sold-out. Pop Festival, the sponsor of the Latin American leg of the tour, grossed $13,516,890 during the Latin American dates between 12 March and 27 March 2011, with that portion of the tour ranking second on the Billboard Hot Tours chart, dated for 8 April 2011. According to Spanish automobile manufacturer SEAT, the sponsor of the European leg of the tour, the 21 venues booked were all sold out, and attended by approximately 360,000 fans. It was one of the highest-grossing tours of the year for 2010.

According to Pollstar, the Sun Comes Out tour grossed a total of $16.9 million during its North American dates, thus ranking 40th on Pollstar's 2010 year-end Top 50 North American Tours list. Also in North America, the tour sold an average of 9,335 tickets per show, and a total of 205,271 tickets. The average gross was $768,182. Worldwide, the tour grossed a total of $39.9 million between 1 January 2011 and 30 June 2011 alone, and ranked 11th on Pollstar's Top 50 Worldwide Tours list, for the time period. Worldwide, for the six-month period, the tour sold an average of 11,661 tickets per event, with a total of 524,723 tickets. The average gross was $886,667 during this period.

For the entire year, from 1 January 2011 through 31 December 2011, the tour grossed a grand total of $53.2 million, and ranked at no. 20 on Pollstar's Top 25 Worldwide Tours, compiled on the basis of this period. The tour sold an average of 13,106 tickets per show, with a final total of 692,064 tickets. The average gross per show was $1,108,333.

On 16 July 2011, in Mérida, Yucatán, Mexico, Shakira broke considerable attendance records when she put on a free concert, attracting nearly 170,000 people to the event. Her concert in her father’s hometown of Beirut, Lebanon, was attended by 28,000, breaking the all-time Lebanese concert-attendance record.

== Live recording ==
The performances that took place at the Palais Omnisports de Paris-Bercy in Paris, France, on 13 and 14 June 2011, were recorded for inclusion in the live album of the tour. The live album was titled Live from Paris (En Vivo Desde París in Hispanic countries), and was released on 5 December 2011. It was made available in three formats: an exclusive edition which includes a DVD and live audio CD, a standard DVD edition, and a Blu-ray Disc edition. The debut of the live album was preceded by the release of "Je l'aime à mourir", Shakira's rendition of the original song written and performed by French singer-songwriter Francis Cabrel, on 29 November 2011. In France, Live from Paris was certified platinum in France by the Syndicat National de l'Édition Phonographique for sales of 100,000 units.

== Opening acts ==
- Parade (United Kingdom)
- Los Huayra (Argentina)
- Vampire Weekend (Argentina)
- Ziggy Marley (Argentina, Paraguay, Peru)
- Vicentico (Argentina)
- Los Auténticos Decadentes (Paraguay)
- J Balvin (Colombia)
- Bomba Estereo (Colombia)
- Train (Colombia, Peru)
- Belanova (Colombia and Mexico)
- Ha*Ash (Mexico)
- Smiley (Romania)
- Bosquito (Romania)
- Emmanuel Horvilleur (Argentina)
- Leo García (Argentina)

== Set list ==
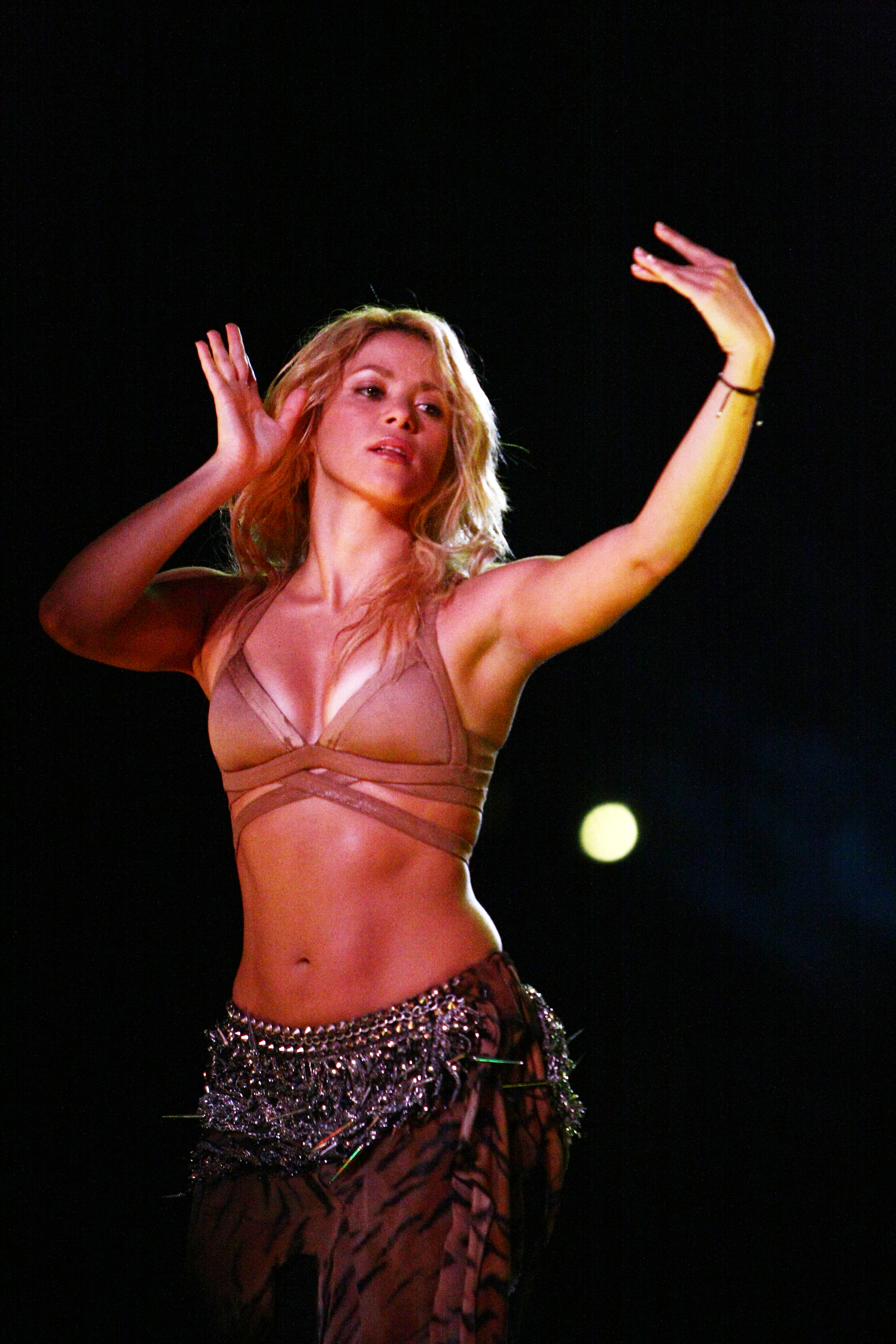
The live version of "Ojos Así" featured a heavily Arabic-inspired violin solo, as well as an extensive belly-dancing routine by Shakira, lasting nearly five minutes. During the segment, Shakira danced on the catwalk, mere feet from the audience (photo from show in Singapore).

The following set list is representative of the New York City show on 21 September 2010.

1. "Pienso en Ti"
2. "Why Wait"
3. "Te Dejo Madrid"
4. "Si Te Vas"
5. "Whenever, Wherever"
6. "Inevitable"
7. "El Nay A'Atini Nay" (Interlude)
8. "Nothing Else Matters" / "Despedida" (Medley)
9. "Gypsy"
10. "La Tortura"
11. "Ciega, Sordomuda"
12. "Underneath Your Clothes"
13. "Gordita"
14. "Sale el Sol"
15. "Las de la Intuición"
16. "Loca"
17. "She Wolf"
18. "Ojos Así"
19. "Antes de las Seis"
20. "Hips Don't Lie"
21. "Waka Waka (This Time for Africa)"

The following setlist is representative of the show at Palau Sant Jordi, Barcelona, on 24 November 2010. All of Shakira's shows in Spanish-speaking cities and regions featured updated set lists compared to elsewhere, with much of the concert sung in Spanish, and even occasionally surprising fans with her songs "Estoy Aquí" or "Pies Descalzos". Also in the Spanish-speaking cities, Shakira performed the original Spanish-language versions of several of her English singles, including "Gitana" ("Gypsy"), "Loba" ("She Wolf"), "Suerte" ("Whenever, Wherever"), "Waka Waka (Esto es África)" ("Waka Waka (This Time for Africa)") and "Caderas No Mienten" ("Hips Don't Lie"), among other variations.

1. Pienso en ti
2. Why Wait
3. Te Dejo Madrid
4. Si Te Vas
5. Suerte (Whenever, Wherever)
6. Inevitable
7. Nothing Else Matters/Despedida
8. Gitana
9. La Tortura
10. Ciega, Sordomuda
11. Gordita
12. Sale el sol
13. Las de la intuición
14. Loca
15. Loba
16. Ojos Así
17. Antes de las Seis
18. Hips Don't Lie
19. Waka Waka (Esto es África)

The following set list is representative of the Mérida, Yucatán, Mexico show on 16 July 2011.

1. Años Luz
2. Te Dejo Madrid
3. Si Te Vas
4. Suerte (Whenever, Wherever)
5. Inevitable
6. Nothing Else Matters/Despedida
7. Gitana
8. La Tortura
9. Ciega, Sordomuda
10. Sale el Sol
11. Las de la Intuición
12. Loca
13. Loba
14. Ojos Así
15. Je l'aime à mourir (Francis Cabrel cover)
16. Hips Don't Lie
17. Waka Waka (Esto es África)

== Tour dates ==
Date	City	Country	Venue	Attendance	Revenue
North America
15 September 2010	Montreal	Canada	Bell Centre	9,712 / 9,712	$792,301
17 September 2010	Uncasville	United States	Mohegan Sun Arena	—	—
18 September 2010	Atlantic City	United States	Etess Arena	—	—
21 September 2010	New York City	United States	Madison Square Garden	14,144 / 14,144	$1,322,713
25 September 2010	Sunrise	United States	Bank Atlantic Center	—	—
27 September 2010	Miami	United States	American Airlines Arena	—	—
28 September 2010	Orlando	United States	Amway Arena	7,847 / 10,942	$615,439
1 October 2010	Dallas	United States	American Airlines Center	—	—
2 October 2010	San Antonio	United States	AT&T Center	—	—
5 October 2010	Corpus Christi	United States	American Bank Center Arena	—	—
6 October 2010	Laredo	United States	Laredo Energy Arena	—	—
8 October 2010	Houston	United States	Toyota Center	—	—
9 October 2010	Hidalgo	United States	State Farm Arena	—	—
12 October 2010	El Paso	United States	Don Haskins Center	—	—
13 October 2010	El Paso	United States	Don Haskins Center	—	—
15 October 2010	San Diego	United States	Valley View Casino Center	—	—
16 October 2010	Las Vegas	United States	Mandalay Bay Events Center	—	—
19 October 2010	Sacramento	United States	ARCO Arena	—	—
20 October 2010	Santa Barbara	United States	Santa Barbara Bowl	—	—
22 October 2010	Oakland	United States	Oracle Arena	11,459 / 13,950	$1,064,257
23 October 2010	Los Angeles	United States	Staples Center	14,087 / 14,087	$1,298,407
25 October 2010	Anaheim	United States	Honda Center	—	—
26 October 2010	Indio	United States	Fantasy Springs Special Events Center	—	—
29 October 2010	Rosemont	United States	Allstate Arena	—	—
Europe
16 November 2010	Lyon	France	Halle Tony Garnier	—	—
17 November 2010	Zurich	Switzerland	Hallenstadion	—	—
19 November 2010	Madrid	Spain	Palacio de Deportes	—	—
21 November 2010	Lisbon	Portugal	MEO Arena	—	—
23 November 2010	Bilbao	Spain	Bizkaia Arena	—	—
24 November 2010	Barcelona	Spain	Palau Sant Jordi	—	—
26 November 2010	Montpellier	France	Arena Montpellier	—	—
27 November 2010	Turin	Italy	Torino Palasport Olimpico	—	—
29 November 2010	Geneva	Switzerland	SEG Geneva Arena	—	—
1 December 2010	Rotterdam	Netherlands	Sportpaleis van Ahoy	—	—
3 December 2010	Munich	Germany	Olympiahalle	—	—
5 December 2010	Amnéville	France	Galaxie Amnéville	—	—
6 December 2010	Paris	France	Palais Omnisports de Paris-Bercy	—	—
9 December 2010	Berlin	Germany	O_{2} World	—	—
11 December 2010	Cologne	Germany	Lanxess Arena	—	—
12 December 2010	Antwerp	Belgium	Sportpaleis	15,716 / 15,746	$893,179
14 December 2010	Manchester	England	M.E.N. Arena	6,317 / 7,379	$429,495
16 December 2010	Dublin	Ireland	The O_{2}	—	—
17 December 2010	Belfast	Northern Ireland	Odyssey Arena	—	—
19 December 2010	Glasgow	Scotland	Scottish Exhibition Hall 4	—	—
20 December 2010	London	England	The O_{2} Arena	—	—
Latin America
1 March 2011	Salta	Argentina	Estadio Padre Ernesto Martearena	—	—
3 March 2011	Córdoba	Argentina	Estadio Mario Alberto Kempes	—	—
5 March 2011	Buenos Aires	Argentina	Estadio Puerto Madero	—	—
6 March 2011	Punta del Este	Uruguay	Hotel Conrad Grounds	—	—
8 March 2011	Asunción	Paraguay	Hipódromo de Asunción	—	—
10 March 2011	Santiago	Chile	Estadio Nacional de Chile	—	—
12 March 2011	Bogotá	Colombia	Simón Bolívar Park	19,292 / 20,00	$1,868,410
15 March 2011	Porto Alegre	Brazil	FIERGS Parking Lot	19,943 / 23,400	$2,140,890
19 March 2011	São Paulo	Brazil	Estádio do Morumbi	46,417 / 50,000	$4,254,760
21 March 2011	Santa Cruz	Bolivia	Estadio Ramón Tahuichi Aguilera	—	—
24 March 2011	Brasília	Brazil	Nilson Nelson Gymnasium	8,056 / 12,300	$861,360
25 March 2011	Lima	Peru	Estadio Universidad San Marcos	43,359 / 43,359	$1,929,350
27 March 2011	Caracas	Venezuela	Estadio de Fútbol USB	9,483 / 13,000	$3,362,120
30 March 2011	Santo Domingo	Dominican Republic	Estadio Olímpico Félix Sánchez	—	—
2 April 2011	Mexico City	Mexico	Foro Sol	—	—
3 April 2011	Mexico City	Mexico	Foro Sol	—	—
5 April 2011	Guadalajara	Mexico	Estadio Tres de Marzo	—	—
7 April 2011	Monterrey	Mexico	Estadio Universitario	—	—
9 April 2011	Guatemala City	Guatemala	Estadio Cementos Progreso	—	—
10 April 2011	San José	Costa Rica	Estadio Nacional de Costa Rica	—	—
12 April 2011	Panama City	Panama	Plaza Figali	—	—
Eurasia
29 April 2011	Abu Dhabi	United Arab Emirates	Du Arena	—	—
2 May 2011	Bologna	Italy	Futurshow Station	—	—
3 May 2011	Milan	Italy	Mediolanum Forum	—	—
5 May 2011	Budapest	Hungary	Budapest Sports Arena	—	—
7 May 2011	Bucharest	Romania	Piața Constituției	—	—
9 May 2011	Belgrade	Serbia	Belgrade Arena	—	—
11 May 2011	Zagreb	Croatia	Arena Zagreb	—	—
14 May 2011	Mannheim	Germany	SAP Arena	—	—
15 May 2011	Mönchengladbach	Germany	Warsteiner HockeyPark	—	—
17 May 2011	Łódź	Poland	Atlas Arena	—	—
19 May 2011	Minsk	Belarus	Minsk-Arena	—	—
22 May 2011	Saint Petersburg	Russia	SKK Peterburgsky	—	—
24 May 2011	Moscow	Russia	Olimpiyskiy	—	—
26 May 2011	Beirut	Lebanon	BIEL Outdoor Venue	—	—
28 May 2011	Rabat	Morocco	OLM Souissi	—	—
29 May 2011	Barcelona	Spain	Estadi Olímpic Lluís Companys	—	—
30 May 2011	Valencia	Spain	Sala Auditorio Marina Sur	—	—
3 June 2011	Madrid	Spain	Vicente Calderón Stadium	—	—
4 June 2011	Bilbao	Spain	San Mamés Stadium	—	—
5 June 2011	Nice	France	Palais Nikaïa	—	—
7 June 2011	Geneva	Switzerland	SEG Geneva Arena	—	—
8 June 2011	Zurich	Switzerland	Hallenstadion	—	—
10 June 2011	Graz	Austria	Schwarzl-Freizeitzentrum	—	—
11 June 2011	Frankfurt	Germany	Festhalle Frankfurt	—	—
13 June 2011	Paris	France	Palais Omnisports de Paris-Bercy	—	—
14 June 2011	Paris	France	Palais Omnisports de Paris-Bercy	—	—
Latin America
15 July 2011	Cancún	Mexico	Moon Palace Resort Grounds	—	—
16 July 2011	Mérida	Mexico	La Plancha	—	—
19 July 2011	Villahermosa	Mexico	Parque Tabasco	—	—
22 July 2011	Tuxtla Gutiérrez	Mexico	Estadio Víctor Manuel Reyna	—	—
24 July 2011	Puebla	Mexico	Estadio de Béisbol Hermanos Serdán	—	—
26 July 2011	León	Mexico	Poliforum León Esplanade	—	—
28 July 2011	Hermosillo	Mexico	Estadio Héroe de Nacozari	—	—
30 July 2011	Tijuana	Mexico	Estadio Caliente	—	—
31 July 2011	Mexicali	Mexico	Centro de Ferias y Exposiciones	—	—
Asia
24 September 2011	Singapore		Marina Bay Street Circuit	—	—
Latin America
30 September 2011	Rio de Janeiro	Brazil	Parque Olímpico Cidade do Rock	—	—
Europe
8 October 2011	Kyiv	Ukraine	Olympic Stadium	—	
Latin America
14 October 2011	San Juan	Puerto Rico	José Miguel Agrelot Coliseum	24,788 / 26,196	$2,859,153
15 October 2011	San Juan	Puerto Rico	José Miguel Agrelot Coliseum	24,788 / 26,196	$2,859,153

== Cancelled shows ==
List of cancelled concerts, showing date, city, country, venue and reason for cancellation
Date	City	Country	Venue	Reason
8 December 2010	Frankfurt	Germany	Festhalle Frankfurt	Postponed to 11 June 2011
1 June 2011	Almería	Spain	Estadio Juegos Mediterráneos	breach of contract
9 July 2011	Werchter	Belgium	Festivalpark	Unknown

== Personnel ==
Credits for the tour adapted from the liner notes of Live from Paris DVD, and AllMusic.

- Promoter — Live Nation
- Live Nation SVP of Touring — Jorge "Pepo" Ferradas
- Live Nation Tour Director — John Sanders
- Tour Director — Marty Hom
- Production Supervisor — Jake Berry
- Tour Accountant — Dan McGee
- Production Co-ordinator — Ali Vatter
- Management — Nexus Management Group
- Road Manager — Rome Reddick
- Head Rigger — Russell Glen
- Rigger — Bjorn Melchert
- Head Carpenter — Pat Boyd
- Show Director — Felix Barrett
- Tour Camera Operations — Redo Jackson, Joe Walohan
- Cameras Supervisor — Brett Turnbull
- Camera Operations — Adam Gohil, Julian Harries, Matt Ingham, Alistair Miller, Lotte Ockeloen, Harriet Sheard, Niels Van Brakel, Tim Van Der Voort, Alan Wells, Nick Wheeler, Shaun Willis
- Projectionist — David Cruz
- Wardrobe Supervisor — Louise Kennedy
- Choreographer — Maite Marcos
- Tour Photographer — Xavi Menos
- Tour Assistant — Brad Kline
- Music Supervisor — Magnus Fiennes
- Musical Production — Shakira, Tim Mitchell
- Show Programmer — Freddy Pinero
- Audio Crew Chief — Simon Bauer
- Audio Monitor Technician — Chris King
- Audio Technicians — William Fisher, Dustin Lewis
- Monitor Engineer — Ed Dragoules
- Key Follow Spot Operator — Linford Hudson
- Carpenters — Eric Duheaney, Brittany Kiefer
- Lighting Director(s) – Fraser Elisha, Daniel O'Brien
- Lighting Designer — Paul Normandale
- Lighting Technicians — Martin Garnish, Kris Lundberg, Ben Rogerson, Chris Roper
- Lighting Crew Chief — Joe Gonzales
- Lighting Programmer — John McGarrigle
- Spot Lights Technician — Fraser McFarlane
- Satge Manager — Shawn Saucier
- Floor Manager — Roger Dempster
- Set Designer — Es Devlin
- Tour Security — Armando Vera
- Venue Security — Joaquin Barcia
- Artist Personal Security — Antonio Merabak
- Production Manager — Bill Leabody
- Advance Production Manager — Phay MacMahon
- Dressing Rooms — Brad Kline
- Front of House Engineer — Michael Keating
- Artist Dresser — Louise Kennedy
- Wardrobe — Pam Lewis
- Makeup — Elaine Kennedy, Lorraine Milligan, Elizabeth Patey
- Hair Stylists — Cynthia Alvarez, Luz Marina Gonzalez
- Musical Director — Tim Mitchell
- Drums — Brendan Buckley
- Keys — Albert Menendez
- Guitar Technician — Andy Corns, Sean "Stig" Tighe
- Guitar(s) – Tim Mitchell, Grecco Buratto
- Bass guitar — Eric Holden
- Backing vocals — Olgui Chirino
- Percussion — Thomas "Dyani" Akuru
- Violin Technician — Sean "Sting" Tighe
- Violin — Una Palliser
- Dancers — Dionne Renee, Yanet Fuentes
- Shakira's Assistant — Gabriela Diaz
- Video Blogs — Xavi Menos
- Video Director — Michael Tinsley
- Video Engineer — Michael Bischof
- Lead LED Technician — Phil Evans
- Additional TV Lighting — Phase 4
- VIP Sponsorship Co-ordinator — Elizabeth Curto
- DVD Technical Facilities — CINEVIDEOGROUP, The Netherlands
- Unit Manager — Bolke Burnaby Lautier
- CINEVIDEOGROUP Project Co-ordinator — Rogier Kalkhove

== See also ==
- List of highest-grossing concert tours by Latin artists
