= SkyBar =

Bar and lounge in Los Angeles, US

Coordinates: 34.09442°N 118.37420°W

The SkyBar (or Skybar) is a bar and lounge inside the Mondrian Hotel, in Los Angeles, California. It was opened in December 1996 by Rande Gerber. It features an outdoor area with a pool overlooking West Hollywood, as well an indoor area with bar. It is known for being visited by celebrities.

SkyBar is used by William Gibson in his 2007 novel Spook Country as a meeting place between the protagonist Hollis Henry and her employer Hubertus Bigend. In Shakira's 2009 song, "Men in This Town", she mentions SkyBar: I went to look / From the Sky Bar to the Standard, nothing took.

As of November 2019, the Mondrian Hotel is owned by SBE Entertainment Group, which also has SkyBar branded lounges in Nassau, Bahamas, and Miami Beach, Florida.
