= Music of Africa =

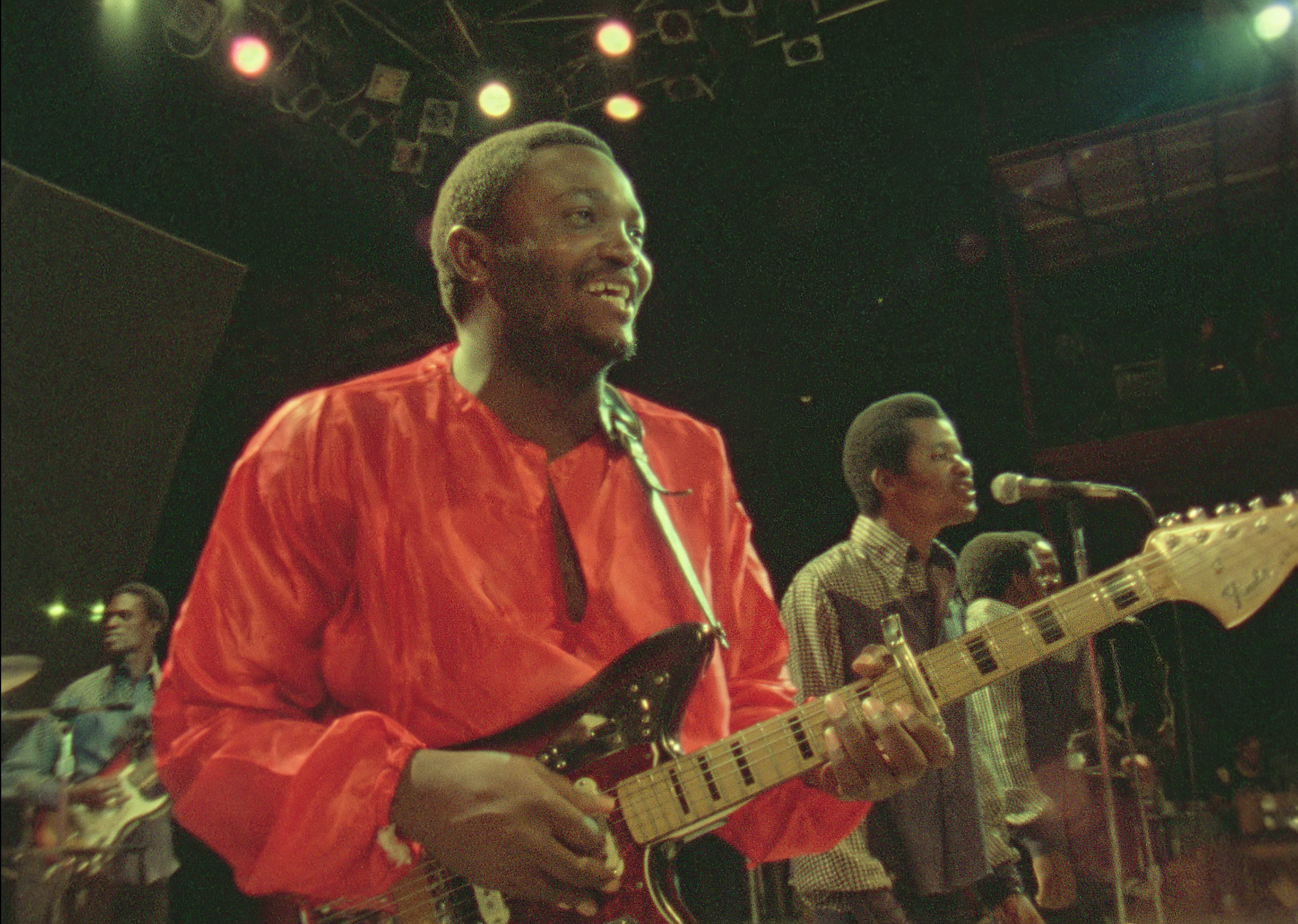
Franco Luambo

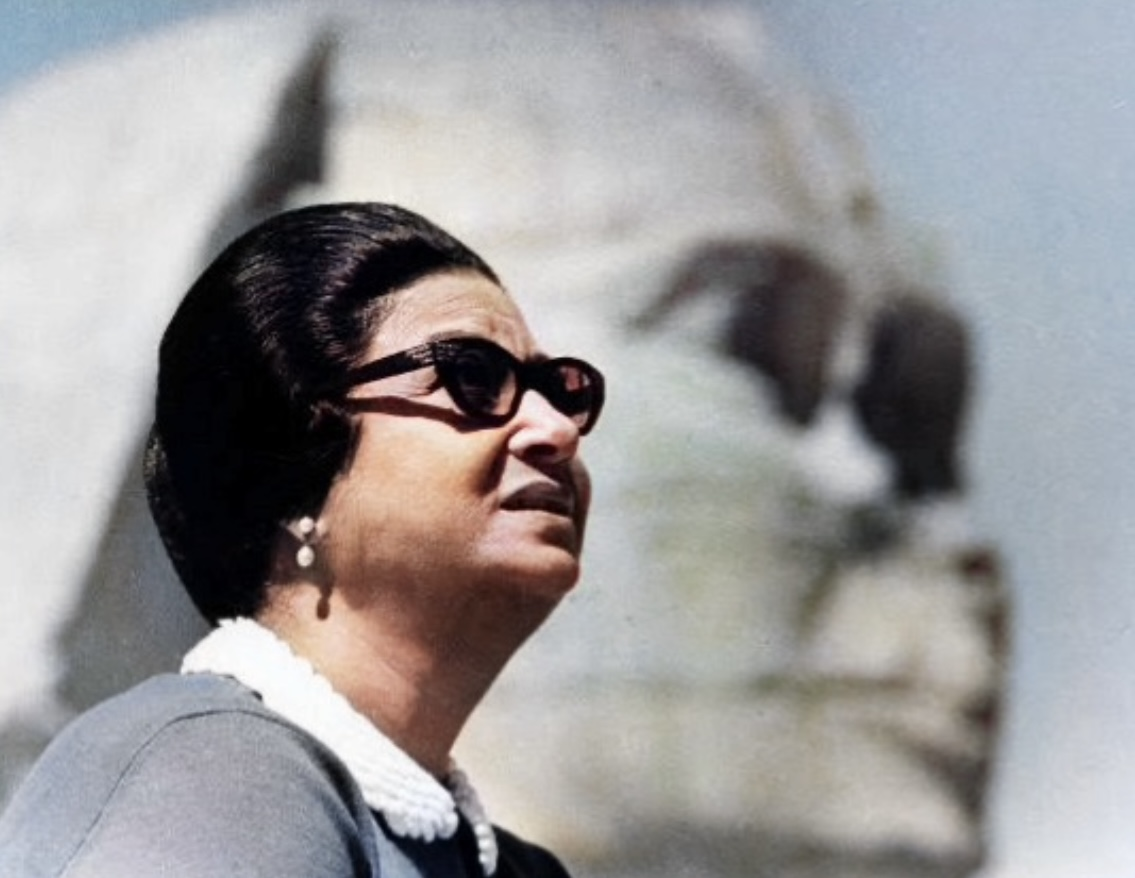
Umm Kulthum

The music of Africa is vast and highly diverse, with different regions and nations maintaining distinct musical traditions. African music includes genres such as makwaya, highlife, mbube, township music, jùjú, fuji, jaiva, afrobeat, afrofusion, mbalax, Congolese rumba, soukous, ndombolo, makossa, kizomba, and taarab, among others. African music also uses a wide variety of instruments from across the continent.

The music and dance traditions of the African diaspora, shaped to varying degrees by African musical traditions, include American genres such as Dixieland jazz, blues, and jazz, as well as Caribbean styles such as calypso (see kaiso) and soca. Latin American music genres including cumbia, salsa, son cubano, rumba, conga, bomba, samba, and zouk developed from the music of enslaved Africans and have, in turn, influenced contemporary African popular music.

Like the music of Asia, India, and the Middle East, African music is highly rhythmic. Its complex rhythmic patterns often involve one rhythm played against another to create a polyrhythm. A common example is the three-against-two rhythm, comparable to a triplet played against straight notes. Sub-Saharan African music traditions frequently rely on a wide array of percussion instruments, including xylophones, djembes, drums, and tone-producing instruments such as the mbira or "thumb piano".

Another distinguishing feature of African music is its call-and-response style, in which one voice or instrument plays a short melodic phrase, and that phrase is echoed by another voice or instrument. This interaction also extends to the rhythm, with one drum playing a rhythmic pattern that is echoed or complemented by another. African music is also highly improvised. A core rhythmic pattern is typically played, with drummers then improvising new patterns over the established foundation.

Traditional music in much of the continent is passed down through oral tradition. Subtle differences in pitch and intonation that do not easily translate to Western notation. African music most closely adheres to Western tetratonic (four-note), pentatonic (five-note), hexatonic (six-note), and heptatonic (seven-note) scales. Harmonization of the melody is accomplished by singing in parallel thirds, fourths, or fifths.

Music is an integral part of communal life in Africa. It is created for both public enjoyment and public participation, and it is this social bonding over music that informed Christopher Small's idea of musicking. Music serves as an avenue for social commentary and moralism, taking forms such as work songs, love songs, lullabies, boasting songs, praise songs, narrative songs, and satirical songs. Music is also important to religion, where rituals and religious ceremonies use music to pass down stories across generations and to accompany singing and dancing.

== Music by country ==
- Music of North Africa
  - Music of Algeria
  - Music of Egypt
  - Music of Libya
  - Music of Mauritania
  - Music of Morocco
  - Music of Tunisia
- Music of East Africa
  - Music of the Comoros
  - Music of Djibouti
  - Music of Eritrea
  - Music of Ethiopia
  - Music of Kenya
  - Music of Madagascar
  - Music of Mauritius
  - Music of Rwanda
  - Music of Seychelles
  - Music of Somalia
  - Music of South Sudan
  - Music of Sudan
  - Music of Tanzania
  - Music of Uganda
- Music of Middle Africa (Music of Central Africa)
  - Music of Burundi
  - Music of Cameroon
  - Music of the Central African Republic
  - Music of Chad
  - Music of the Democratic Republic of the Congo
  - Music of the Republic of the Congo
  - Music of Equatorial Guinea
  - Music of Gabon
  - Music of São Tomé and Príncipe
- Music of West Africa
  - Music of Benin
  - Music of Burkina Faso
  - Music of Cape Verde
  - Music of Gambia
  - Music of Ghana
  - Music of Guinea
  - Music of Guinea-Bissau
  - Music of Ivory Coast
  - Music of Liberia
  - Music of Mali
  - Music of Niger
  - Music of Nigeria
  - Music of Senegal
  - Music of Sierra Leone
  - Music of Togo
- Music of Southern Africa
  - Music of Angola
  - Music of Botswana
  - Music of Eswatini
  - Music of Lesotho
  - Music of Malawi
  - Music of Mozambique
  - Music of Namibia
  - Music of South Africa
  - Music of Zambia
  - Music of Zimbabwe

== Music by regions ==
=== North Africa and the Horn of Africa ===
North Africa is the seat of ancient Egypt and Carthage, civilizations with strong ties to the ancient Near East and which influenced the ancient Greek and Roman cultures. Egypt later came under Persian, then Greek and Roman rule, while Carthage was later ruled by the Romans and the Vandals. The region was subsequently conquered by Arab forces, who incorporated the region into the Maghreb of Arab Africa (sky-blue and dark green region on map). Its music maintains close ties with Middle Eastern music and utilizes similar melodic modes (maqamat).

North African music encompasses a wide range of styles, from the music of ancient Egypt to the Berber and Tuareg music of the desert nomads. For centuries, the region's art music has followed the conventions of Arabic and Andalusian classical music, while its popular contemporary genres include the Algerian raï.

The music of Sudan and the Horn of Africa, including the music of Eritrea, Ethiopia, Djibouti and Somalia, may be grouped with those of North Africa. Somali music is typically pentatonic, using five pitches per octave in contrast to a heptatonic (seven note) scale such as the major scale. The music of the Ethiopian highlands is based on a modal system called qenet, which includes four main modes: tezeta, bati, ambassel, and anchihoy. Three additional modes are variations on the above: tezeta minor, bati major, and bati minor. Some songs take the name of their qenet, such as tizita, a song of reminiscence.

=== West, Central, Southeast and South Africa ===
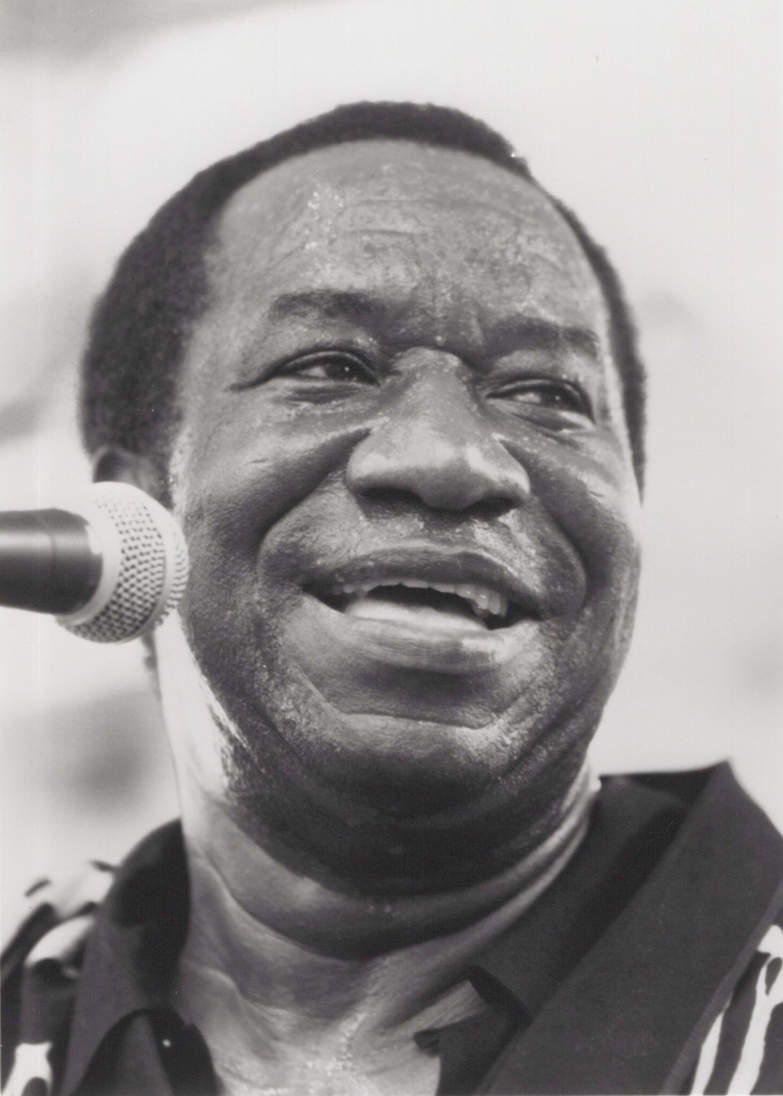
Tabu Ley Rochereau

Arthur Morris Jones (1889–1980), an ethnomusicological, observed that the shared rhythmic principles of Bantu African musical traditions form a single overarching system. Similarly, master drummer and scholar C. K. Ladzekpo affirms the "profound homogeneity" of Bantu African rhythmic principles.

African traditional music is frequently functional in nature. Performances may be long and often involve the participation of the audience. There are specialized songs for work, childbirth, marriage, hunting, and political activities, as well as music intended to ward off evil spirits or honor benevolent spirits, the dead, and the ancestors. These forms are not typically performed outside their intended social contexts, and many are associated with specific dances. In some situations, professional musicians perform sacred, ceremonial, or courtly music at royal courts.

Outside the greater Horn of Africa, as categorized above, the remainder of Sub-Saharan Africa can be divided into four musicological regions:

- Eastern region (light green on map): includes the music of Uganda, Kenya, Rwanda, Burundi, Tanzania, Malawi, Mozambique, and Zimbabwe, as well as the islands of Madagascar, the Seychelles, Mauritius, Somalia (which can also be considered to be part of East Africa), and Comoros. Many of these traditions have been influenced by Arabic music and by the music of India, Indonesia, and Polynesia, although the region's indigenous styles are primarily in the Bantu/Niger–Congo- speaking world.
- Southern region (brown on map): includes the music of South Africa, Lesotho, Swaziland, Botswana, Namibia, and Angola.
- Central region (dark blue on map): includes the music of Chad, the Central African Republic, the Democratic Republic of the Congo, and Zambia, including the traditions of Pygmy music.
- Western region (yellow on map): includes the music of Senegal and the Gambia; Guinea and Guinea-Bissau; Sierra Leone and Liberia; the inland plains of Mali, Niger and Burkina Faso; the coastal nations of Cote d'Ivoire, Ghana, Togo, Benin, Nigeria, Cameroon, Gabon, and the Republic of the Congo; and island nations such as São Tomé and Príncipe.

Southern, Central and West Africa share many features of the broader Sub-Saharan musical tradition, while also exhibiting additional influences from Muslim regions of Africa and, in modern times, from the Americas and Western Europe.

Azande song from the Congo performed with xylophone.

Afrobeat, jùjú, fuji, highlife, makossa, and kizomba are among the genres performed in West Africa. West African music varies regionally, with Muslim regions incorporating elements of Islamic music and non-Muslim regions drawing more heavily on indigenous traditions, according to the historian Sylviane Diouf and ethnomusicologist Gerhard Kubik. Diouf notes that traditional Muslim West African Music incorporates elements of the Islamic call to prayer (originating from Bilal ibn Rabah, an Abyssinian African Muslim in the early 7th century), including lyrics praising God, melodic and pitch variations, "words that seem to quiver and shake" in the vocal cords, dramatic shifts in scale, and nasal intonation. Kubik similarly observes that the vocal style of Muslim West African singers "using melisma, wavy intonation, and so forth" reflect the musical heritage of the region's long contact with the Arabic-Islamic world of the Maghreb which began in the seventh and eighth centuries. In terms of instrumentation, Kubik notes that string instruments (including ancestors of the banjo) were traditionally favored in Muslim West African communities, while drumming was more characteristic of non-Muslim West Africans.

== Musical instruments ==
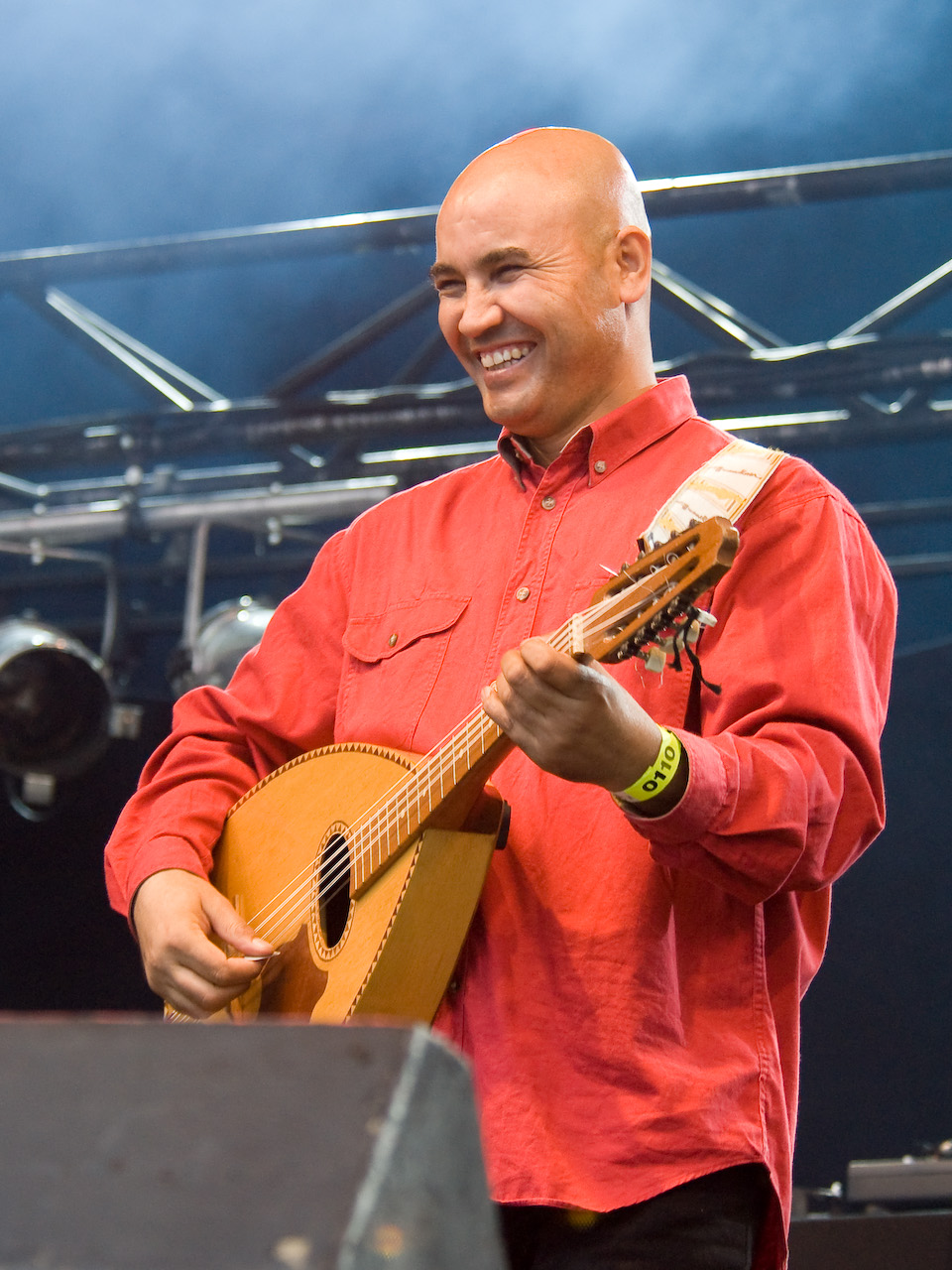
Algerian musician Abderrahmane Abdelli playing the mandole

Besides vocalisation, which uses various techniques such as complex, hard melisma and yodeling, a wide variety of musical instruments are also used. African instruments include a wide range of drums, slit gongs, rattles, and double bells; harps and harp-like instruments such as the kora and the ngoni; fiddles; various xylophones and lamellophones such as the mbira; and wind instrument including flutes and trumpets. String instruments are also used, with lute-like instruments such as the oud and the ngoni serving as accompaniment in some regions.

Sub-Saharan African musical instruments are grouped into five categories: membranophones, chordophones, aerophones, idiophones, and percussion. Membranophones include drums such as kettles, clay pots, and barrels. Chordophones are stringed instruments like harps and fiddles. Aerophones are wind instruments, including flutes and trumpets, similar to those found in American music. In Northern Nigeria, Niger, and Northern Cameroon, the algaita – a double reed instrument – is commonly played at festivals and seasonal celebrations.

Idiophones are rattles and shakers, while percussion also includes body-produced sounds such as foot-stomping and hand-clapping. Many wooden instruments are carved with shapes or figures that represent ancestry, and some are decorated with feathers or beads.

Drums used in African traditional music include talking drums, bougarabou and djembe in West Africa, water drums in Central and West Africa, and the different types of ngoma (or engoma) drums of Central and Southern Africa. Other percussion instruments include rattles and shakers, such as the kashaka (or kosika), rain sticks, bells, and wooden sticks. Africa also has many other types of drums, flutes, string, and wind instruments.

Polyrhythmic playing is one of the most widespread characteristics of Sub-Saharan music, in contrast to polyphony in Western music. Several uniquely designed instruments evolved over time to facilitate the playing of simultaneous contrasting rhythms. The mbira, kalimba, kora, ngoni and dousn'gouni organize their notes not in a single linear arrangement from bass to treble, but in two separated rank arrays, allowing performers to more easily produce cross rhythms. The continuing influence of this design principle can be seen in the 20th-century American instruments the gravi-kora and gravikord, which are modern adaptations of traditional instruments.

== Relationship to language ==
Many African languages are tonal, leading to a close relationship between music and language in some local cultures. In these communities, vocal sounds and physical movements accompany musical performance. In singing, the tonal patterns of the language impose constraints on the melodic patterns. Conversely, in instrumental music, native speakers can often perceive implied text or meanings within the music. This is also the basis of drum languages, or "talking drums".

== Influences on African music ==
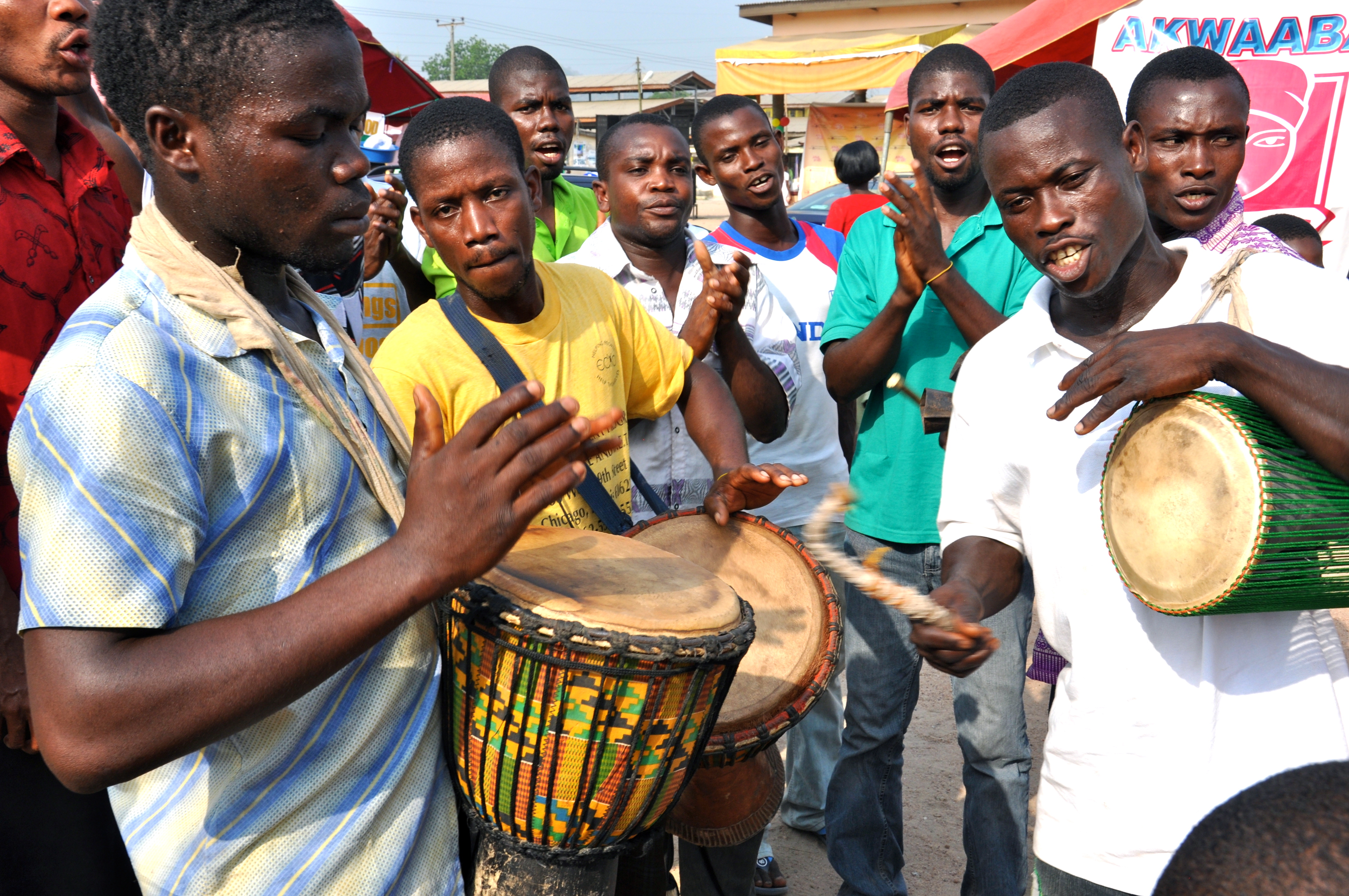
Traditional drummers in Ghana

Historically, several factors have influenced the traditional music of Africa. Language, environment, diverse cultural practices, politics, and population movement have all contributed to its development. Each African group evolved in a different area of the continent, they experienced different climates, foods, and interactions with neighboring peoples. Each group moved at different rates and to different places than others, and thus each was influenced by different people and circumstances. In addition, these communities operated under different forms of governance, which further contributed to the diversity of the music that was created throughout Africa.

== Influence on North American music ==
African music has played a significant role in the shaping of what we know today as Dixieland, the blues, and jazz. These genres have all borrowed from African rhythms and sounds brought across the Atlantic by enslaved Africans. While Sub-Saharan African music is typically upbeat polyrhythms and joyful in character, the blues developed as an aesthetic response to the conditions of slavery in the Americas. The blues has likely evolved as a fusion of an African blue note scale with European twelve tone musical instruments. The musical traditions of Irish and Scottish settlers later blended with African-American musical elements, contributing to the development of old-time, bluegrass, and other similar genres.

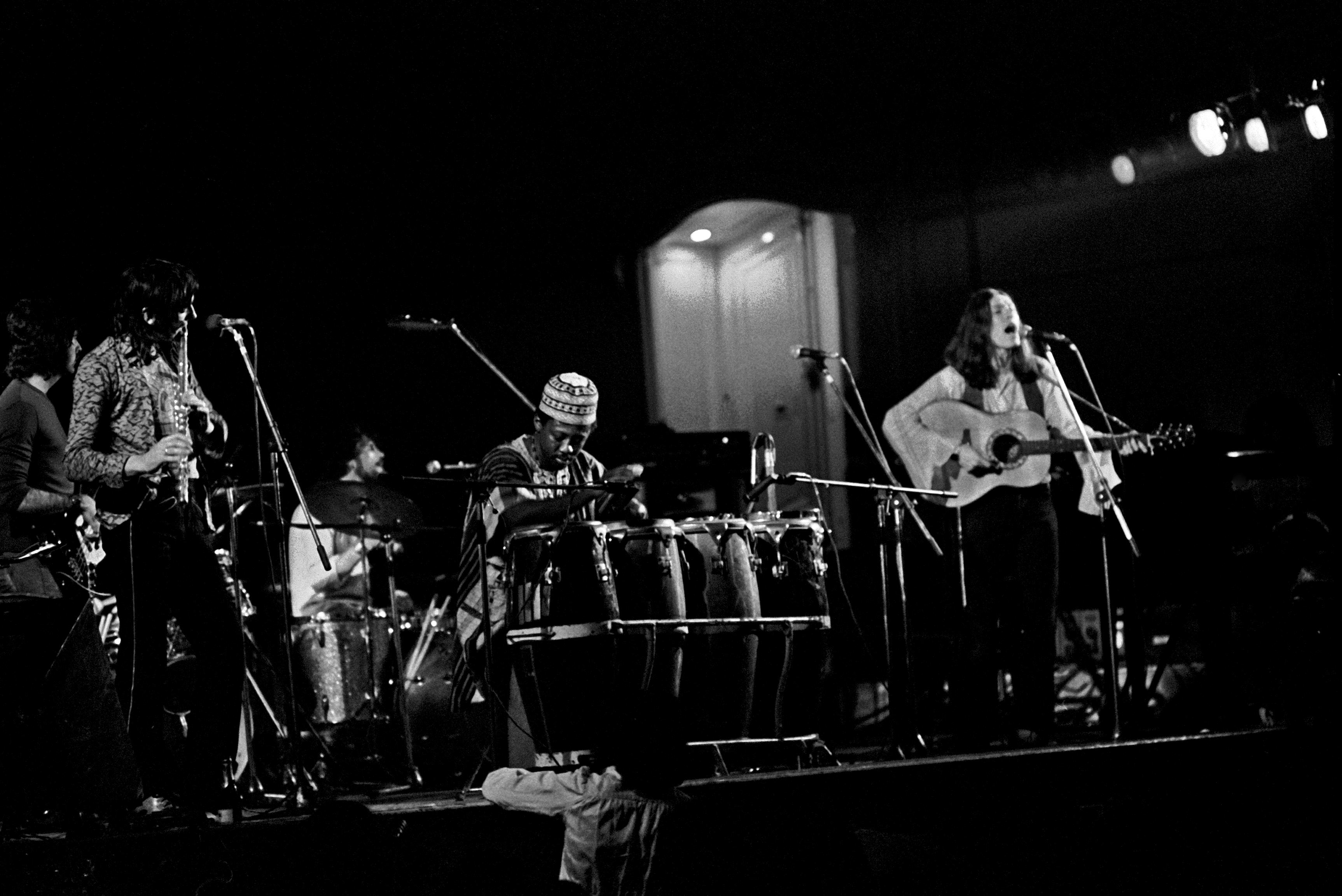
Steve Winwood's progressive rock/jazz rock band Traffic often used West African rhythms

On his album Graceland, American folk musician Paul Simon employed South African bands, rhythms, and melodies as the musical backdrop for his lyrics, featuring artists such as Miriam Makeba, Ladysmith Black Mambazo and Ray Phiri. In the early 1970s, Remi Kabaka, an Afro-rock avant-garde drummer, developed foundational drum patterns that shaped the Afro-rock sounds in bands such as Ginger Baker's Air Force, The Rolling Stones, and Steve Winwood's Traffic. He continued to collaborate with Winwood, Paul McCartney, and Mick Jagger throughout the decade.

Certain Sub-Saharan African musical traditions also significantly influenced works such as Disney's The Lion King and The Lion King II: Simba's Pride, which blend traditional African and Western musical styles. Songs like "The Lion Sleeps Tonight" and "He Lives in You" combine Zulu and English lyrics and incorporate traditional South African isicathamiya and mbube with more modern western styles. The films additionally include numerous Bantu words: for example, hakuna matata is an actual Swahili phrase meaning "no worries", while characters such as Simba, Kovu, and Zira mean "lion," "scar," and "hate," respectively.

Miriam Makeba, Hugh Masekela, and Babatunde Olatunji were among the earliest African artists to develop sizable fan bases in the United States. During the 1960s and 1970s, non-commercial African-American radio stations promoted African music as part of their cultural and political missions. African music also found enthusiastic audiences at Historically Black colleges and universities (HBCUs) and held particular appeal for activists in the civil rights and Black Power movements.

== Afro-pop ==
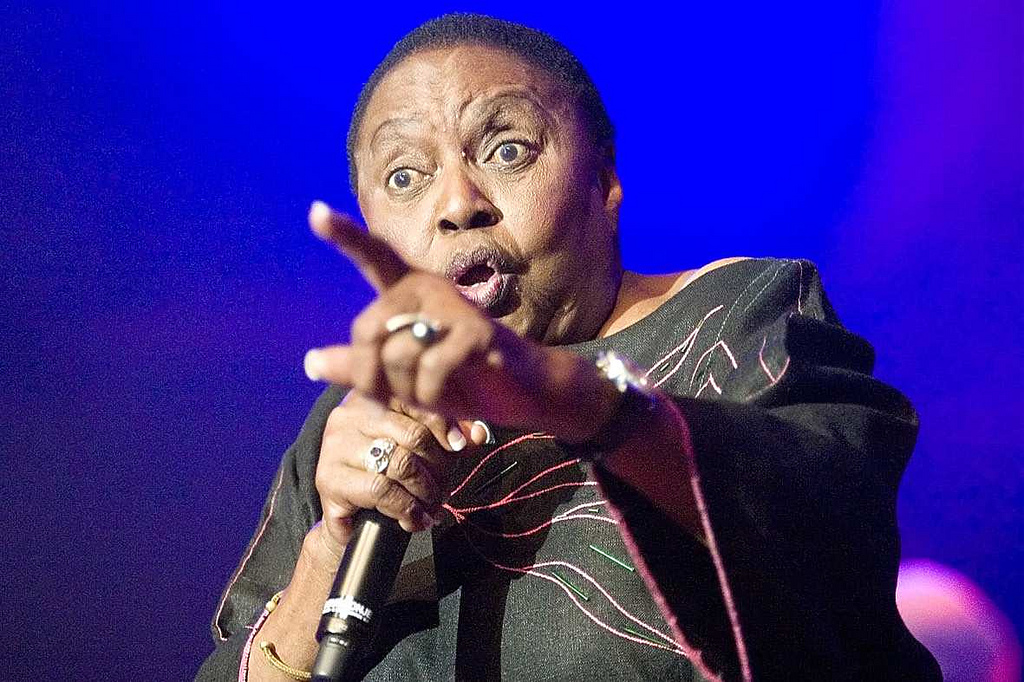
Miriam Makeba during a performance

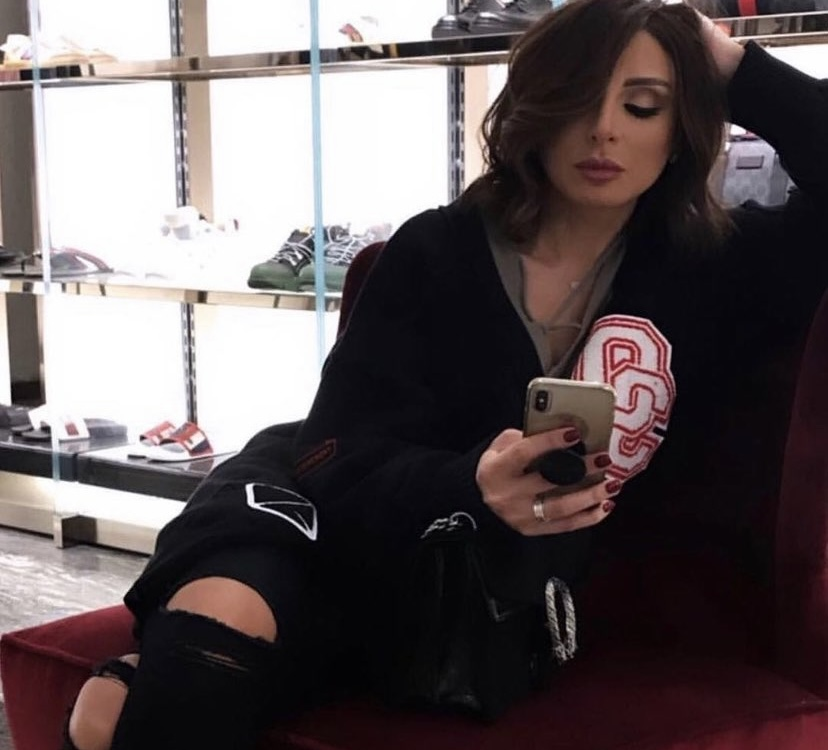
Angham, pop star

African popular music – commonly referred to as African pop or afro-pop – is as vast and varied as Africa's traditional music. Most contemporary African popular genres have developed through cross-pollination with Western popular music. Many Western genres, including blues, jazz, and rumba, derive in part from African musical traditions carried to the Americas by enslaved Africans. These rhythms and sounds have subsequently been adapted by newer genres like rock, soul, and rhythm and blues. In turn, African popular music has adopted elements of Western music, particularly musical instruments and recording studio techniques.

In 1933, Solomon Linda formed Solomon Linda's Original Evening Birds. Although Linda was illiterate, he composed songs from an early age while guarding cattle. The group's most internationally acclaimed hit, "Mbube," released in 1939, became the first African record to sell more than 100,000 copies. Another 20th-century South African singer was Miriam Makeba, who played a key-role in the 1960s in drawing global attention to African music and its meaning. Beginning in the 1950s, Zenzile Miriam Makeba became one of Africa's most influential and celebrated musicians. She performed in three groups, including one all-female band, and sang a wide range of styles, including jazz, traditional African music, and music that was popular in Western Africa at the time. Much of Makeba's work was mbube, "a style of vocal harmony which drew on American jazz, ragtime, and Anglican church hymns, as well as indigenous styles of music." After moving to the United States, passport complications forced her to remain there, and she incorporated American influences into her African repertoire. "The Empress of African Music" died at the age of 76.

In West Africa, Fela Kuti and Tony Allen performed Afrobeat music. Femi Kuti and Seun Kuti followed their father Fela Kuti. The Afro-Euro hybrid Cuban son also influenced African popular music; some of Africa's earliest guitar bands performed Cuban covers. Early guitar-based bands from the Congo referred to their music as rumba, though it was son rather than Cuban rumba. This Congolese style eventually evolved into soukous. In 1972, Cameroonian songwriter and saxophonist Manu Dibango released "Soul Makossa" which has since become the most sampled African record in history.

The 2010 FIFA World Cup afro-fusion and soca theme song, "Waka Waka (This Time for Africa)" performed by Shakira and Freshlyground, sampled the makossa-influenced, presumably soldier-tribute melody "Zamina mina (Zangaléwa)" by the group Golden Sounds.

== Kalpop ==
Kalpop is a music genre that originated in the Klassikan royal communities under the Klassik Nation record label. It blends Klassikan, African, multilingual (multicultured), and popular music. Kalpop originated in its modern form during the mid-1990s in Kenya before later spreading to the United States and the United Kingdom. Kalpop has developed a growing fan base, with numerous locally established and emerging bands – more than thirteen active groups in Nairobi alone – helping to solidify the genre through a variety of individually hosted and collaboratively organized Kalpop-themed events. Artists performing Kalpop in Kenya include DON SANTO, Badman Killa, Blessed Paul, Cash B, Jay Nuclear, Rekless, G-Youts (Washu B and Nicki Mulla), Sleek Whizz, and Chizei, among others.

== Music industry ==
For African artists, live concerts have traditionally been one of the few reliable sources of income. Declining record sales, driven by piracy and changing consumer behavior, have made recorded music a less viable revenue stream. The enforcement of copyright law remains weak in many parts of Africa. MusikBi, the first legal music download platform in Africa, offers downloads but not streaming and is limited by Africa's generally slow internet speeds. Some African countries, including Kenya, Gambia, and South Africa, have experienced protests over what is perceived as excessive airtime given to American music. In Zimbabwe, regulations require that 75% of airtime be dedicated to local music. These protective actions have contributed to the growth of new genres like Urban Grooves. In 2016, Sony Music expanded into Africa by opening an office in Nigeria. Traditionally, services provided by major Western recording studios were not available in Africa, and local demand for their music was largely met through piracy.

Since 2014, the festival Visa for Music has been held annually in Morocco, presenting musical artists with African roots through performances, music videos, and professional marketing aimed at creative-industries worldwide.

== See also ==
- Music of the African diaspora
- African heavy metal
- African popular music
- Umm Kulthum
- Victor Kofi Agawu
- Paul Berliner
- Ian Brennan (music producer)
- Clave (rhythm)
- Gravikord
- International Library of African Music
- Arthur Morris Jones
- Ashenafi Kebede
- Gerhard Kubik
- List of African guitarists
- Mine bengidzakiwe
- Polyrhythm
- Hugh Tracey
- Traditional sub-Saharan African harmony
- World music
