= Waka Waka (This Time for Africa) =

2010 single by Shakira featuring Freshlyground

Single by Shakira featuring Freshlyground

from the album Listen Up! The Official 2010 FIFA World Cup Album
- Language: English; Fang; Xhosa; Spanish
- Released: 7 May 2010
- Recorded: February 2010
- Studio: El Granero (Punta del Este, Uruguay); La Marimonda (Nassau, Bahamas); Rodeo Recording (New York, NY); Sonic Projects Studios (Miami, FL); Platinum Sound Studios (New York, NY)
- Genre: Pop; Afro fusion; Afropop; soca
- Length: 3:22
- Label: Epic
- Songwriters: Shakira; John Hill; Golden Sounds; Jean Paul Zé Bella; Victor Dooh Belley; Emile Kojidie; Annie Anzouer
- Producer: John Hill

Shakira singles chronology
| "Gypsy" (2010) | "Waka Waka (This Time for Africa)" (2010) | "Loca" (2010) |

Music video
- "Waka Waka (This Time for Africa)" on YouTube; "Waka Waka (Esto es África)" on YouTube

"Waka Waka (This Time for Africa)" is a song by Colombian singer Shakira, featuring the South African band Freshlyground. Co-written by Shakira and John Hill, it was released on 7 May 2010 by Epic Records as the official song of the 2010 FIFA World Cup, which was held in South Africa. Released in English and Spanish (with the title "Waka Waka (Esto es África)"), the song interpolates the original Cameroonian makossa song "Zamina mina (Zangaléwa)" by Golden Sounds and the lyrics encourage the players to aim for goals like soldiers on a battlefield.

It received generally favourable reviews from critics. However, the selection of Shakira to sing the song generated controversy after numerous South Africans expressed disappointment in FIFA's decision, arguing that a native artist should have been assigned the role. "Waka Waka (This Time for Africa)" peaked at number one on the record charts of numerous countries worldwide and was the most successful song of 2010 in seven countries. In the United States, it peaked at number 38 on the Billboard Hot 100 chart and was later certified platinum by the Recording Industry Association of America (RIAA) for selling over one million units in the country. The single attained multiplatinum certifications in several countries, including diamond certifications in Brazil, France, Germany and Sweden. As of 2019, "Waka Waka (This Time for Africa)" had sold 15 million downloads worldwide, becoming one of the best-selling digital singles of all time. The success earned the song a Guinness World Record, certified as the most streamed FIFA World Cup song on Spotify.

"Waka Waka" is considered the anthem of the World Cup. The music video for "Waka Waka (This Time for Africa)" was directed by Marcus Raboy and shows Shakira and a group of dancers and children dancing to the song together. It features cameos by various footballers like Cristiano Ronaldo and Lionel Messi. It became popular on YouTube, receiving more than 4.5 billion views as of June 2026 and becoming the 18th-most-watched video of all time on the site. Shakira performed the song at the 2010 FIFA World Cup opening ceremony on 10 June as well as at the closing ceremony on 11 July. It was also included on the set list of her The Sun Comes Out World Tour (2010–11), El Dorado World Tour (2018) and Las Mujeres Ya No Lloran World Tour (2025).

== Background and release ==
"They met up with Shakira's producer [John Hill] and he played us the ‘"Waka Waka (This Time for Africa)" song – which we loved – and asked us to mess around with it and come up with some parts. We wrote a bridge and added some Southern African elements to the song and a few months later heard that we were on what was to become the biggest World Cup song in history! Pretty awesome."

— Zolani Mahola, lead singer of Freshlyground, on the development process of the song

In February 2010, Shakira wrote and produced "Waka Waka (This Time for Africa)" with American record producer John Hill, who had previously collaborated with her on several songs from She Wolf. The inclusion of Freshlyground, a South African rock band whose genres span jazz, blues and kwela (afro-pop) on the track took place after Hill met with their producer in New York. The band were finishing their studio album Radio Africa when Hill approached them requesting input regarding the song. The producer left the band alone to make additions to the track and returned hours later to listen to it. Giving little reaction after hearing it, Hill expressed interest in recording "everything I'd heard here" and told the band that they would hear from him later.

On April 26, 2010, the Fédération Internationale de Football Association (FIFA) announced that "Waka Waka (This Time for Africa)" would serve as the official song of the 2010 FIFA World Cup, which was to begin in South Africa later in June, and would also appear on Listen Up! The Official 2010 FIFA World Cup Album. The announcement mentioned that Shakira would perform the song at the closing ceremony of the cup, which would take place before the Final match, on 11 July at the FNB Stadium in Johannesburg. She would also headline the World Cup FIFA World Cup Kick-Off Celebration Concert on 10 June at the Orlando Stadium in Johannesburg. The song was premiered on 28 April and was made available for digital download on the iTunes Store on 7 May 2010. It received a physical release as a CD single on 28 May. A Spanish-language version of the song, titled "Waka Waka (Esto es África)," was also recorded by Shakira. It was released as a single in specific markets. "K-Mix" versions of "Waka Waka (This Time for Africa)" and "Waka Waka (Esto es África)" were also included in the singer's ninth studio album, Sale el Sol, which she released in October the same year.

== Composition ==
"Waka Waka (This Time for Africa)" (2010)
19-second sample of the song containing the chorus and a portion of Freshlyground's verse. The song contains soca music influences.

"Waka Waka (This Time for Africa)" draws inspiration from traditional African music, blending an African Colombian rhythm with a Soca-influenced beat and Congolese rumba guitar style. Freshlyground's unique afro-fusion sound further incorporated traditional South African music such as kwela. Zolani Mahola (the band's lead singer) predominantly delivered her verse in Xhosa. In addition, the song contains instrumentation from a Southern African guitar. The chorus of the song and the words "waka waka" are borrowed from "Zangaléwa", a 1986 song recorded by Cameroonian band Golden Sounds, which was a hit not only across Africa but also in Colombia, with the help of West African DJs, where Shakira heard the tune when she was a child. According to Debora Halbert, author of the book The State of Copyright: The Complex Relationships of Cultural Creation in a Globalized World, Golden Sounds were also not the original creators of the chorus, since it was adapted from "military marches of unknown origins that go back as far as World War II". "Waka Waka (This Time For Africa)" is written in the key of D major, and has tempo of 127 beats per minute.

The lyrics of "Waka Waka (This Time for Africa)" compare football (soccer) players to soldiers on a battlefield and encourage them to fight for their goals. Fraser McAlpine from BBC Music Chart Blog described them to be "about an undisclosed event which is about to happen for Africa, in which everyone gets together and enjoys the fruits of their hard work, even though there have been many hardships along the way." The Spanish version of the song does not contain a war metaphor and instead "talks about walls coming down."

== Controversy ==
Several news outlets have accused Shakira of "stealing" or "plagiarism", owing to similarities between "Waka Waka (This Time for Africa)" and "Zamina mina (Zangaléwa)". However, members of the group Golden Sounds/Zangalewa, Guy Dooh and Jean Paul Ze Bella and their manager Didier Edo, held a press conference to "'enlighten international opinion' and above all to 'silence rumors about a possible legal action'". Regarding the controversy, Edo said: "There is no question of plagiarism as some have thought, but the international singer has simply readapted the song", and that there was an agreement with Shakira's management and Sony Music.

FIFA's decision to choose "Waka Waka (This Time for Africa)" as the official song was negatively received by some South African people, who felt that Shakira was not the "right person to represent the country's first World Cup," arguing that an African artist should have been assigned the role. South African musicians were also displeased regarding the lack of native acts scheduled to perform at the FIFA World Cup Kick-Off Celebration Concert on 10 June 2010. They expressed anger towards the South African Football Association (SAFA) for letting international artists such as Alicia Keys, the Black Eyed Peas, and Shakira headline the event. Subsequently, the Creative Workers Union of South Africa planned a demonstration to be held on 15 April, but called it off after SAFA announced that the repertoire of performing acts would be finalised after "consultation with fans and host cities." Danny Jordaan, head of the South African World Cup Organising Committee and president of SAFA, released a statement assuring that "the incredibly talented South African and African music industry will play a major part in the tournament's off-field success and character." Freshlyground's violinist Kyla-Rose Smith defended FIFA's decision to select "Waka Waka (This Time for Africa)" as the official song, saying: "I think that the World Cup is a global event but it's also a business, a huge marketing exercise. FIFA requires a musician of a certain global reach to appeal to all the different kinds of people who are involved and witness and watch the World Cup. So I understand the choice of someone like Shakira."

The "waka waka" riff of the song also generated controversy. In June 2010, it was reported that Dominican musician Wilfrido Vargas had decided to file a lawsuit against Shakira for allegedly plagiarising the riff off his composition "El Negro No Puede" for a sum of $11 million, which was performed by Dominican group Las Chicas del Can. However, Vargas later directly addressed the issue and said he did not have any intention to sue Shakira, clarifying that he himself did not own the riff used in "El Negro No Puede", and that the prior statements made in his name were fabricated.

== Critical reception ==
Fraser McAlpine from BBC Music Chart Blog gave the song a four-out-of-five rating and praised its welding of "undulating African guitars to a clod-hopping, skippy township beat." However, he felt that the song did not seem to be about the World Cup and could "just as easily be about a global effort to build water-pipes in the worst drought-ridden areas of the continental land-mass." Robert Copsey from Digital Spy rated it three out of five stars, favouring its "ludicrously catchy" chorus, although he commented: "Somewhat inevitably, 'Waka Waka (This Time For Africa)' sees Shak[ira] replace her usual kooky lyrics with lines that wouldn't sound out of place on an X Factor winner's song." Kyle Anderson from MTV picked "Waka Waka (This Time for Africa)" as the best official World Cup song, calling it a "funky, inspirational tune." Canada.com critic Stuart Derdeyn, however, was highly critical of the song and called it "sonic vomit" and "perhaps the stupidest official song for any major sporting event ever."

"Waka-Waka (This Time for Africa)" received a nomination at the 2010 Premios Shock for "Best Radio Song" ("Mejor Canción Radio"), but lost to "No Digas lo Siento" by Don Tetto. The song was nominated "Top Latin Song" at the 2011 Billboard Music Awards. In the same year, it received a nomination for "Latin Digital Download of the Year" at the 2011 Latin Billboard Music Awards. At the 2011 Nuestra Tierra Awards, "Waka Waka (This Time for Africa)" was nominated for "Best Song", but lost to Santiago Cruz and Fernando Osorio's "Cuando Regreses". In the same year, It was recognized at the 19th Annual ASCAP Latin Music Awards as one of the most-performed Pop Songs of 2010. The song was recognized as one of the most-performed songs at the 19th BMI Latin Music Awards in 2012.

Billboard included "Waka Waka (This Time for Africa)" among the 50 essential Latin songs of the 2010s decade. The song has also been popularised by Tottenham fans in celebration of their Europa League win in Bilbao.

== Commercial performance ==
=== Europe ===
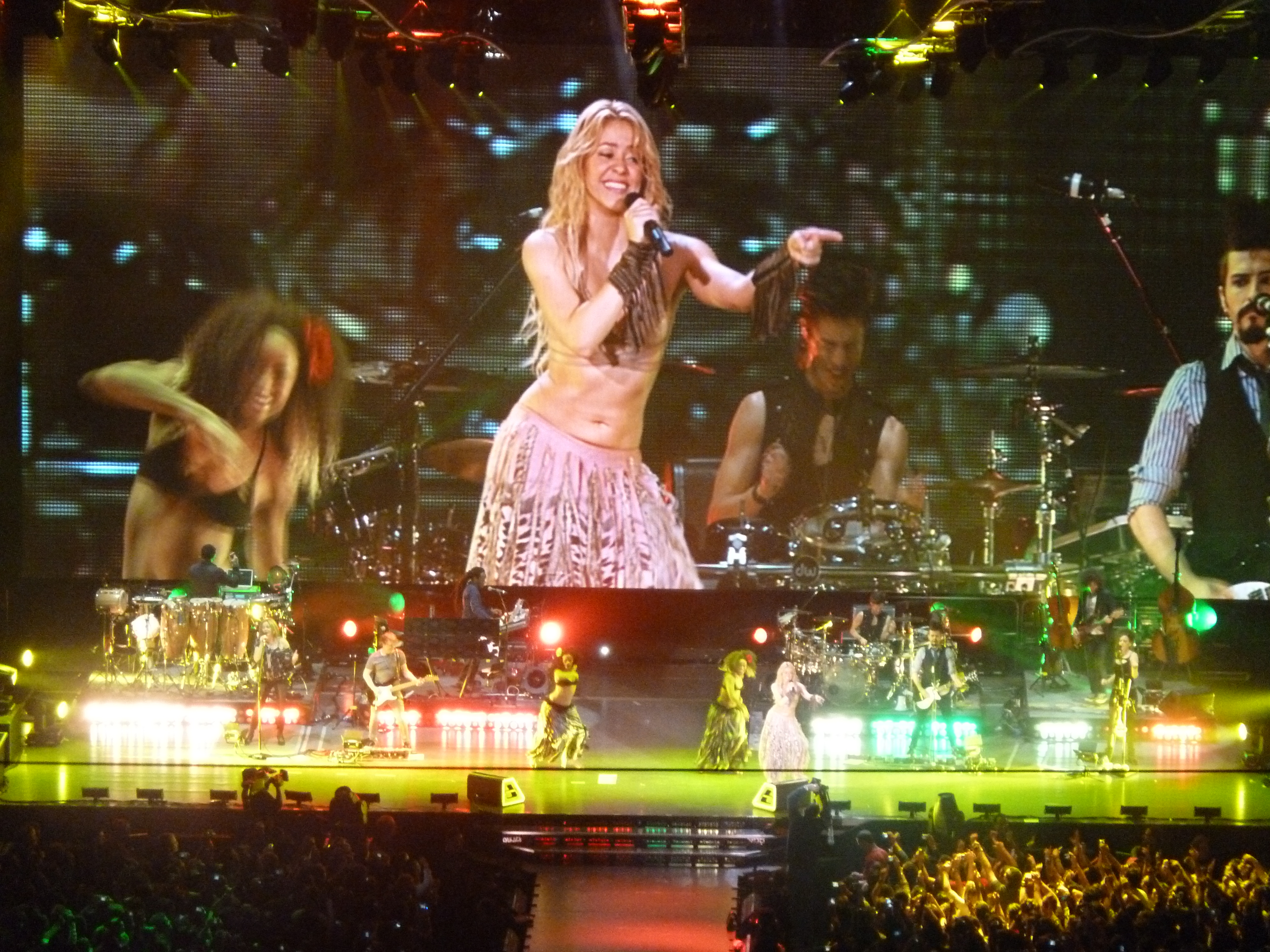
Shakira performing "Waka Waka (This Time for Africa)" during The Sun Comes Out World Tour in Madrid, Spain. The song peaked at number one in Spain for 17 consecutive weeks.

The song became a success across Europe. In Austria, "Waka Waka (This Time for Africa)" displaced Somali-Canadian artist K'naan's song "Wavin' Flag" (which was also another promotional song for the World Cup) from the top spot on the Ö3 Austria Top 40 chart, ending its four-week-long run at number one. "Waka Waka (This Time for Africa)" went on to spend six consecutive weeks atop the chart and a total of 63 weeks, making it Shakira's longest-charting single in the region. It is also Shakira's most successful single in the country and was certified double-platinum by the International Federation of the Phonographic Industry (IFPI) Austria, denoting sales of 60,000 units. In both the Dutch-speaking Flanders and French-speaking Wallonia regions of Belgium, the song reached number one on the Ultratop charts, logging a total of five and eight weeks at the spot, respectively. It was the best-selling single of 2010 in Wallonia and was certified double-platinum by the Belgian Entertainment Association (BEA) in 2012 for completing sales of 60,000 units. In Denmark, the song topped the Hitlisten chart and was certified triple-platinum by the IFPI Denmark.

"Waka Waka (This Time for Africa)" debuted at number one on the French Singles Chart and stayed at the position for six consecutive weeks. The success of the song was such in the country that it appeared on the chart for three consecutive years (2010–13) and for a total of 132 weeks. The Syndicat National de l'Édition Phonographique (SNEP) certified the single platinum for sales of 400,000 units. It was the best-selling single in the country in 2010 with sales of 373,068 copies. The song peaked at number one on the German Singles Chart for six weeks and became the second highest selling single in the country in 2010. It was certified quintuple-gold by the Bundesverband Musikindustrie (BVMI), denoting shipments of 1,200,000 units, making "Waka Waka (This Time for Africa)" Shakira's highest-selling single in the country. In Italy, the song entered the FIMI singles chart at number two and peaked at number one a week later. It stayed at number one for 16 consecutive weeks. In 2014, the single was certified six times-platinum by the Federazione Industria Musicale Italiana (FIMI) for selling 180,000 units in the country.

The song topped the Spanish Singles Chart for 17 consecutive weeks and charted for 69 weeks in total. "Waka Waka (This Time for Africa)" was the best-selling single in Spain in 2010, coinciding with the country's victory of the World Cup that year. It was later certified six times-platinum by the Productores de Música de España (PROMUSICAE) for selling 240,000 units in the country. The song is one of the best-selling singles in Spain. The song has been certified 10× Platinum (Diamond) in the country. It was the best selling female single of all time in the country until 2022.

"Waka Waka (This Time for Africa)" became Shakira's biggest single in Sweden, where it peaked atop the Sverigetopplistan chart and appeared on the chart for 58 weeks. By 2012, the single had sold 360,000 downloads in the country and had been certified nine times-platinum by the IFPI. The ring tone format of the song has received a triple-platinum certification. In Switzerland, the song debuted at number five and later peaked atop the chart for four weeks. It spent 86 weeks on the chart and was certified triple-platinum in 2011 by the IFPI. "Waka Waka (This Time for Africa)" peaked at number 21 in the United Kingdom and was certified double platinum by the British Phonographic Industry (BPI) in 2022 for sales and streams of 1,200,000 units.

=== Asia and Americas ===
"Waka Waka (This Time for Africa)" was the most-downloaded song of 2010 on the Nokia Music Store, based on its performance in 38 countries, including India and China. In India and Lebanon, it peaked at number three. (Note: See #Charts) According to Manoj Gairola of Hindustan Times, the song was downloaded by more than 300,000 subscribers of a telecom company that held exclusive rights to sell "Waka Waka (This Time for Africa)" on mobile phones.

The song attained number one positions in Argentina, Chile and Shakira's native country Colombia. In Mexico, it spent five successive weeks at number one, and was certified double-platinum by the Asociación Mexicana de Productores de Fonogramas y Videogramas (AMPROFON) in 2012 for completing sales of 120,000 downloads. In Canada, the song was a huge success. Despite peaking at 11 on Canada Hot 100 chart, Waka Waka (This Time for Africa) was certified as 8 times Platinum in the country. The song is her second best seller in Canada, after Hips Don't Lie which is a Diamond single. In the United States, the song debuted at number 43 on the Billboard Hot 100 - Shakira's second-highest debut on the chart at that time. It later peaked at number 38. The Recording Industry Association of America (RIAA) certified the song platinum in 2011 after it completed sales of 1,000,000 downloads. According to Nielsen SoundScan, the single has sold 1,763,000 downloads in the United States, making it Shakira's third-highest selling digital single in the country (as of March 2014).

== Music video ==
The dance routine performed during the song's chorus in the video (pictured) was dubbed the "waka waka dance". Adam Fairholm from IMVDb called it "recognizable as a dance and pretty easy to replicate if you have any dancing skill."

The music video for "Waka Waka (This Time for Africa)" was directed by Marcus Raboy. It was developed and conceptualised by Shakira along with Antonio Navas, executive creative director of international marketing agency Ogilvy & Mather. Navas explained that the concept of the video was to "take the viewer on a trip around the world, ending in Africa." The dance sequences were choreographed by Hi-Hat, who had previously worked with Shakira on the video of "She Wolf" (2009). The video was shot in Los Angeles and was recorded in multiple languages. It was premiered on 6 June 2010 and became the first-ever music video by Sony Music to receive a release in 3D format.

The video chiefly focuses on Shakira and a crowd composed of numerous dancers and children dancing together. Freshlyground appear during their verse, with lead singer Zolani Mahola and violinist Kyla-Rose Smith "front and center". Towards the end of the video, various child dancers perform solo dance routines. The video interpolates archival footage of past football matches, including the infamous scene of Italian footballer Roberto Baggio missing the decisive penalty in the shoot-out of the 1994 FIFA World Cup Final against Brazil, and the 2006 FIFA World Cup Final at the beginning of the video. It also features appearances by footballers Dani Alves, Gerard Piqué, Carlos Kameni, Lionel Messi and Rafael Marquez.

Adam Fairholm from IMVDb praised the dance sequences and wrote that while Shakira was "great," the best part of the music video were the appearances by Freshlyground, the children, and the footballers. He praised Raboy for "making everyone seem like a big, happy family" and felt the video was adequately representative of South African culture. MTV writer Kyle Anderson complimented the energy of the video and Shakira's dancing ability. He highlighted the footage of a football match showing a "killer slide tackle" as the "key" scene of the video. The video went viral on video-sharing website YouTube, reaching number one on The Guardian Viral Video Chart.

== Live performances ==
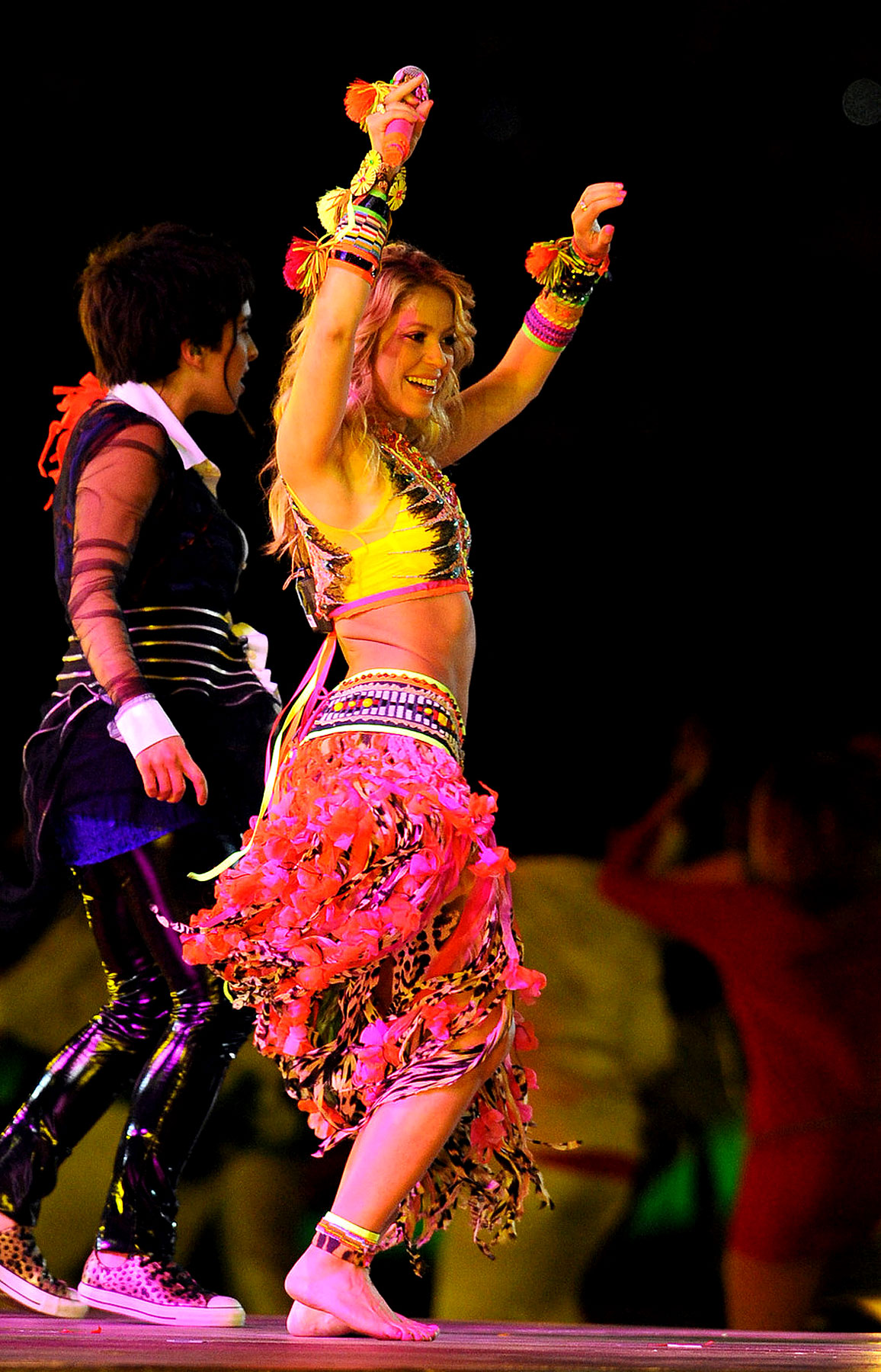
Shakira performing "Waka Waka (This Time for Africa)" during the 2010 FIFA World Cup final

Shakira performed "Waka Waka (This Time for Africa)" at the 2010 FIFA World Cup opening ceremony on 10 June at the Orlando Stadium in Johannesburg, South Africa. The song was preceded by performances of her past singles "Hips Don't Lie" and "She Wolf". Freshlyground also appeared on the stage and Mahola sang her verse of the song. Numerous African dancers and musicians accompanied Shakira during the performance. For the performances, Shakira was dressed in a black and white zebra-print jumpsuit coupled with a silk-fringed skirt and bracelets made of brown leather and silver pearls. Her outfit was designed by Italian fashion designer Roberto Cavalli. Diane Coetzer from Billboard praised the performance and called it the "crowning moment" of the concert show. Although critical of Cavalli's costume, Los Angeles Times critic Ann Powers complimented Shakira's performance of the three songs and commended her incorporation of native dancers and musicians in the show, writing: "It was just a symbolic gesture, but a strong one in this evening-long review of pop music's journey from Africa to every corner of the earth, and back." Pitbull, Jennifer Lopez, and Claudia Leitte's headlining performance at the 2014 FIFA World Cup opening ceremony was negatively compared to Shakira's as fans found the former's show disappointing in comparison to the latter's.

The song was performed for a second time by Shakira and Freshlyground at the 2010 FIFA World Cup closing ceremony on 11 July 2010. Shakira's costume was designed by Cavalli again and consisted of a tulle top, a silk-fringed skirt with floral motifs and a denim belt. The top and belt were embroidered with pearls of various colours. Shakira also wore leather bracelets embellished with floral silk decorations. Billboard critic Coetzer wrote that the performance of the song "sparked an ecstatic response" from the spectators. Siddharth Saxena from Times of India described the presentation as a "riot of colour, light and laser show".

"Waka Waka (This Time for Africa)" was included on the set list of Shakira's The Sun Comes Out World Tour (2010–11) and was performed as the last song of the encore segment of the concert shows. During the performances, she invited fans onto the stage to dance with her as confetti "filled the entire arena". The song has returned to all tours Shakira has done since.

Shakira also performed the song with Jennifer Lopez during the Super Bowl LIV halftime show in 2020.

== Legacy ==
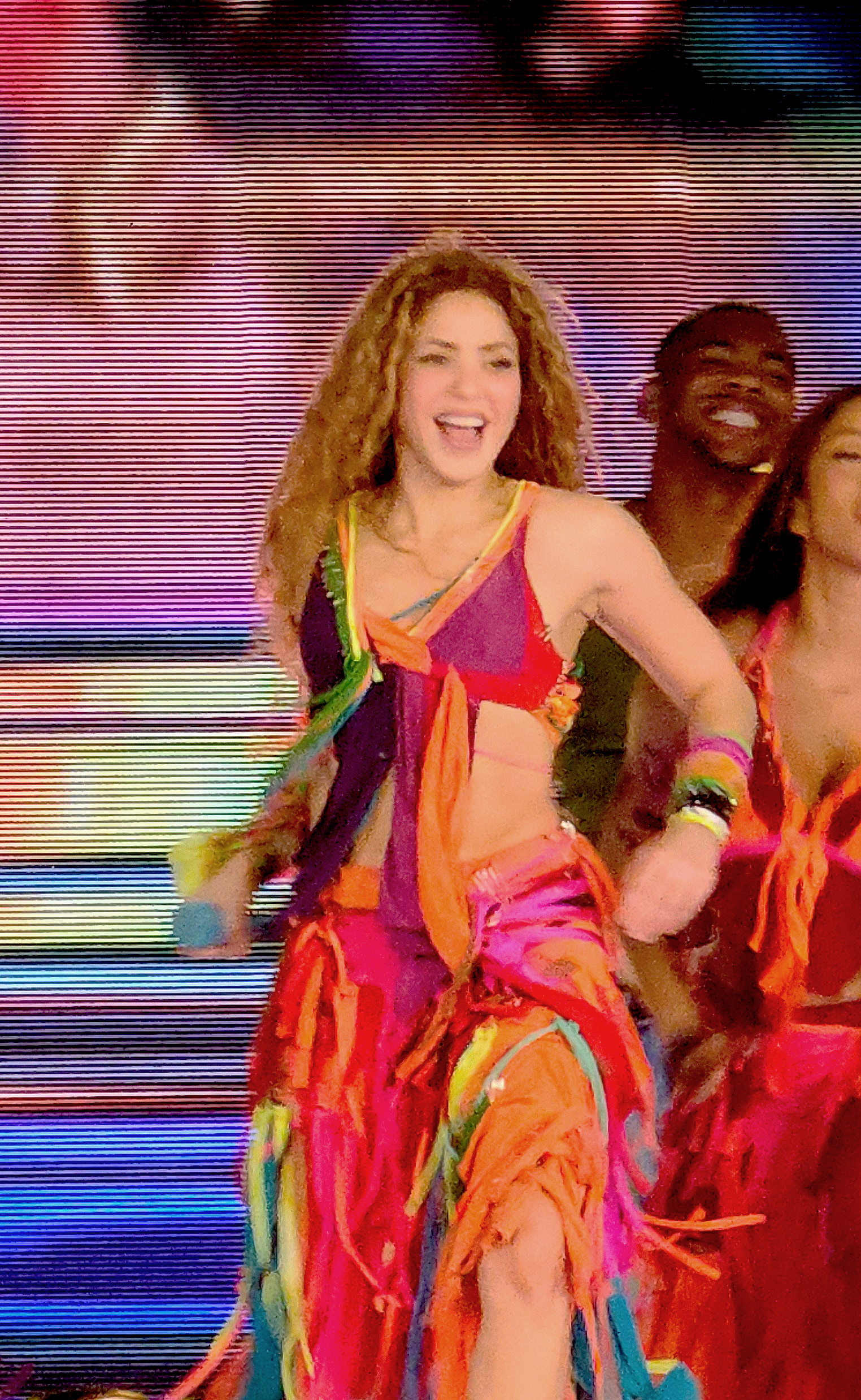
Shakira performing "Waka Waka (This Time for Africa)" during Las Mujeres Ya No Lloran World Tour in Medellín

As of May 2014, "Waka Waka (This Time for Africa)" has reportedly sold nearly ten million units worldwide, making it one of Shakira's best-selling songs along with "Hips Don't Lie". It has been proclaimed as one of the best FIFA World Cup songs of all time by publications including Billboard, Dallas Observer and The Sydney Morning Herald. With more than 4 billion views on YouTube as of October 2024, the music video of "Waka Waka (This Time for Africa)" is the twentieth most-watched video of all time and the most-viewed female music video on the site. In an interview in 2014, Shakira spoke about the importance of the song in her life as she met Spanish footballer Gerard Piqué during the filming of the video, with whom she pursued a romantic relationship and had two sons.

The song returned to prominence in 2014 after a large number of Brazilian fans criticised "We Are One (Ole Ola)", the official song of the 2014 FIFA World Cup, for not correctly representing the culture of the host country Brazil. Many "expressed their frustration" on Twitter using the hashtag "#VoltaWakaWaka" (Portuguese for "ComeBackWakaWaka"), demanding FIFA to reinstate "Waka Waka (This Time for Africa)" as the official song.

The song was featured in the video game Just Dance 2018 and was also included in a medley sung by Shakira in the Super Bowl LIV halftime show in February 2020.

Arsenal goalkeeper for the women's team Daphne van Domselaar has a chant similar to the song as does striker for the men's team Kai Havertz.

== Track listings ==
- CD single
1. "Waka Waka (This Time for Africa)" – 3:24
2. "Waka Waka (This Time for Africa)" (Club mix) – 3:12
- CD single - K-Mix
1. "Waka Waka (This Time For Africa) (K-Mix)" – 3:05
- CDr single - Sharam Mixes
1. "Waka Waka (This Time For Africa) (Sharam World Cup Mix)" – 9:55
2. "Waka Waka (This Time For Africa) (Sharam Cape Town Dub)" – 9:45
3. "Waka Waka (This Time For Africa) (Sharam Joburg Dub)" – 9:00

== Charts ==
=== "Waka Waka (This Time for Africa)" ===
==== Weekly charts ====
| Chart (2010–2011) | Peak position |
|---|---|
| Australia (ARIA) | 32 |
| Austria (Ö3 Austria Top 40) | 1 |
| Belgium (Ultratop 50 Flanders) | 1 |
| Belgium (Ultratop 50 Wallonia) | 1 |
| Canada Hot 100 (Billboard) | 11 |
| CIS Airplay (TopHit) | 134 |
| Croatia International Airplay (Top lista) | 1 |
| Czech Republic Airplay (ČNS IFPI) | 1 |
| Denmark (Tracklisten) | 1 |
| Europe Hot 100 (Billboard) | 1 |
| Finland (Suomen virallinen lista) | 1 |
| France (SNEP) | 1 |
| Germany (GfK) | 1 |
| Global Dance Tracks (Billboard) | 12 |
| Hungary (Rádiós Top 40) | 1 |
| Hungary (Single Top 40) | 2 |
| Ireland (IRMA) | 10 |
| Israel International Airplay (Media Forest) | 3 |
| Italy (FIMI) | 1 |
| Japan Hot 100 (Billboard) | 12 |
| Luxembourg Digital Song Sales (Billboard) | 1 |
| Mexico Airplay (Billboard) | 16 |
| Netherlands (Dutch Top 40) | 6 |
| Netherlands (Single Top 100) | 2 |
| New Zealand (Recorded Music NZ) | 34 |
| Norway (VG-lista) | 2 |
| Poland Airplay (ZPAV) | 1 |
| Russia Airplay (TopHit) | 149 |
| Scottish Singles Sales (Official Charts) | 17 |
| Slovakia Airplay (ČNS IFPI) | 2 |
| South Korea (Circle) | 54 |
| Spain (Promusicae) | 1 |
| Sweden (Sverigetopplistan) | 1 |
| Switzerland (Schweizer Hitparade) | 1 |
| Ukraine Airplay (TopHit) | 43 |
| UK Singles (Official Charts) | 21 |
| US Billboard Hot 100 | 38 |

| Chart (2012) | Peak position |
|---|---|
| UK Singles (Official Charts) | 72 |

| Chart (2020) | Peak position |
|---|---|
| Scotland Singles (OCC) | 80 |
| UK Singles Sales (OCC) | 86 |
| US Digital Song Sales (Billboard) | 20 |

| Chart (2022–2023) | Peak position |
|---|---|
| Global 200 (Billboard) | 87 |
| Middle East and North Africa (IFPI) | 9 |
| UK Singles Downloads (Official Charts) | 79 |

| Chart (2025–2026) | Peak position |
|---|---|
| Brazil Hot 100 (Billboard) | 100 |
| Germany (GfK) | 25 |
| Global 200 (Billboard) | 60 |
| Israel (Mako Hitlist) Live Version | 38 |
| Luxembourg (Billboard) | 17 |
| Middle East and North Africa (IFPI) | 17 |
| Norway (VG-lista) | 61 |
| Panama Streaming (PRODUCE) | 54 |
| Portugal (AFP) | 62 |
| Saudi Arabia (IFPI) | 14 |
| Slovakia Singles Digital (ČNS IFPI) | 92 |
| South Africa Airplay (TOSAC) | 8 |
| Spain (Promusicae) | 24 |
| Sweden (Sverigetopplistan) | 40 |
| United Arab Emirates (IFPI) | 8 |
| UK Singles (Official Charts) | 26 |

==== Monthly charts ====
Monthly chart performance
| Chart (2026) | Peak position |
|---|---|
| Panama Streaming (PRODUCE) | 97 |

==== Year-end charts ====
| Chart (2010) | Position |
|---|---|
| Austria (Ö3 Austria Top 40) | 2 |
| Belgium (Ultratop Flanders) | 2 |
| Belgium (Ultratop Wallonia) | 1 |
| Canada (Canadian Hot 100) | 59 |
| Croatia International Airplay (HRT) | 12 |
| Denmark (Tracklisten) | 1 |
| European Hot 100 Singles (Billboard) | 4 |
| Finnish Foreign Singles Chart | 1 |
| France (SNEP) | 1 |
| Germany (Official German Charts) | 2 |
| Hungary (Rádiós Top 40) | 4 |
| Italy (FIMI) | 1 |
| Italy Airplay (EarOne) | 27 |
| Lebanon (Airplay Top 100) | 3 |
| Netherlands (Dutch Top 40) | 37 |
| Netherlands (Single Top 100) | 4 |
| Sweden (Sverigetopplistan) | 3 |
| Switzerland (Schweizer Hitparade) | 1 |
| Taiwan (Hito Radio) | 74 |
| UK Singles (Official Charts Company) | 141 |

| Chart (2011) | Position |
|---|---|
| Belgium (Ultratop Flanders) | 69 |
| Belgium (Ultratop Wallonia) | 41 |
| Hungary (Rádiós Top 40) | 58 |
| Switzerland (Schweizer Hitparade) | 33 |

=== "Waka Waka (Esto es África)" ===
==== Weekly charts ====
| Chart (2010) | Peak position |
|---|---|
| US Hot Latin Songs (Billboard) | 2 |
| US Latin Pop Airplay (Billboard) | 2 |
| US Latin Digital Song Sales (Billboard) | 1 |

| Chart (2020) | Peak position |
|---|---|
| US Latin Digital Songs Sales (Billboard) | 2 |

| Chart (2021) | Peak position |
|---|---|
| US Latin Digital Songs Sales (Billboard) | 24 |

| Chart (2023) | Peak position |
|---|---|
| Spain (PROMUSICAE) | 85 |

==== Monthly charts ====
Monthly chart performance
| Chart (2010) | Peak position |
|---|---|
| Peru TV Airplay (UNIMPRO) | 4 |

==== Year-end charts ====
| Chart (2010) | Position |
|---|---|
| Spain (Promusicae) | 1 |
| US Hot Latin Songs (Billboard) | 29 |

| Chart (2011) | Position |
|---|---|
| Spain (Promusicae) | 30 |

| Chart (2013) | Position |
|---|---|
| US Latin Digital Songs (Billboard) | 5 |

| Chart (2014) | Position |
|---|---|
| Billboard Latin Digital Songs | 6 |

| Chart (2015) | Position |
|---|---|
| Billboard Latin Digital Songs | 12 |

| Chart (2016) | Position |
|---|---|
| Billboard Latin Digital Songs | 13 |

| Chart (2020) | Position |
|---|---|
| Billboard Latin Digital Songs | 9 |

== Certifications and sales ==
Certifications for "Waka Waka (This Time for Africa)"
| Region | Certification | Certified units/sales |
|---|---|---|
| Australia (ARIA) | Gold | 35,000^{^} |
| Austria (IFPI Austria) | 2× Platinum | 60,000^{*} |
| Belgium (BRMA) | 2× Platinum | 60,000^{*} |
| Brazil (Pro-Música Brasil) | 3× Diamond | 750,000^{‡} |
| Canada (Music Canada) | 8× Platinum | 640,000^{‡} |
| Denmark (IFPI Danmark) | 3× Platinum | 270,000^{‡} |
| Finland (Musiikkituottajat) | Platinum | 13,248 |
| France (SNEP) | Diamond | 600,000 |
| Germany (BVMI) | 4× Platinum | 1,200,000^{‡} |
| Italy (FIMI) | 6× Platinum | 180,000^{‡} |
| India | — | 300,000 |
| Mexico (AMPROFON) | 2× Platinum | 120,000^{*} |
| Mexico (AMPROFON) certification for "Waka Waka (Esto es África)" | Diamond+2× Platinum+Gold | 450,000^{‡} |
| New Zealand (RMNZ) | 3× Platinum | 90,000^{‡} |
| Spain (Promusicae) certification for "Waka Waka (Esto es África)" | 5× Platinum | 300,000^{‡} |
| Spain (Promusicae) certification for "Waka Waka (This Time For Africa)" | 5× Platinum | 300,000^{‡} |
| Sweden (GLF) | 9× Platinum | 360,000^{‡} |
| Sweden (GLF) Ringtone | 3× Platinum | 120,000^{‡} |
| Switzerland (IFPI Switzerland) | 3× Platinum | 90,000^{^} |
| United Kingdom (BPI) | 3× Platinum | 1,800,000^{‡} |
| United States (RIAA) Digital downloads only | Platinum | 1,763,000 |
Summaries
| Worldwide (downloads) | — | 15,000,000 |
^{*} Sales figures based on certification alone.^{^} Shipments figures based on certification alone.^{‡} Sales+streaming figures based on certification alone.

== See also ==
- List of best-selling singles in Canada
- List of best-selling singles in Germany
- List of best-selling singles in Spain
- List of best-selling Latin singles
