= St Dominic's Priory School =

Coordinates: 33.99694°S 25.54776°E

St. Dominic’s Priory School
- Port Elizabeth; South Africa

Information
- Type: Independent • Co-educational • High, Junior and Pre-Primary • Catholic School.
- Motto: Veritas
- Established: 1900
- Grades: Pre R - 12
- Language: English • Afrikaans • Xhosa
- Sports: Swimming • Cricket • Tennis • Hockey • Soccer
- Houses: Marcellin • Rosary • Trinity
- Website: www.priory.co.za

St. Dominic's Priory School is an independent co-educational Catholic Pre, Primary, and High School in Godlonton Avenue in the suburb of Miramar, in Port Elizabeth, Eastern Cape, South Africa. The school was founded in 1900.

== History ==
In 1867, six foundresses left Dublin and sailed to the missionary station in Port Elizabeth, where they founded the Holy Rosary Convent; it was followed by two other Catholic schools - Marist Brothers College for boys (started by the Marist Brothers) and St Dominic's Priory (started by the Cabra Dominican Sisters). Holy Rosary Convent, Marist Brothers College and Priory High merged to form Trinity High School, for boys and girls, in 1983. The Trinity High School moved to the Holy Rosary Convent buildings in central Port Elizabeth, while a junior school remained at the Priory. However, in 2000, urban decline and economic factors led to the move of Trinity High School to the Priory buildings when the Holy Rosary buildings were sold.

== Notable alumni ==
- Athol Fugard, playwright, actor and director
- Zolani Mahola, singer of Freshlyground
- Marguerite Poland, novelist
- Reeva Steenkamp, model and paralegal

== See also ==
- List of Marist Brothers schools
