= Zolani Mahola =

South African singer (born 1981)

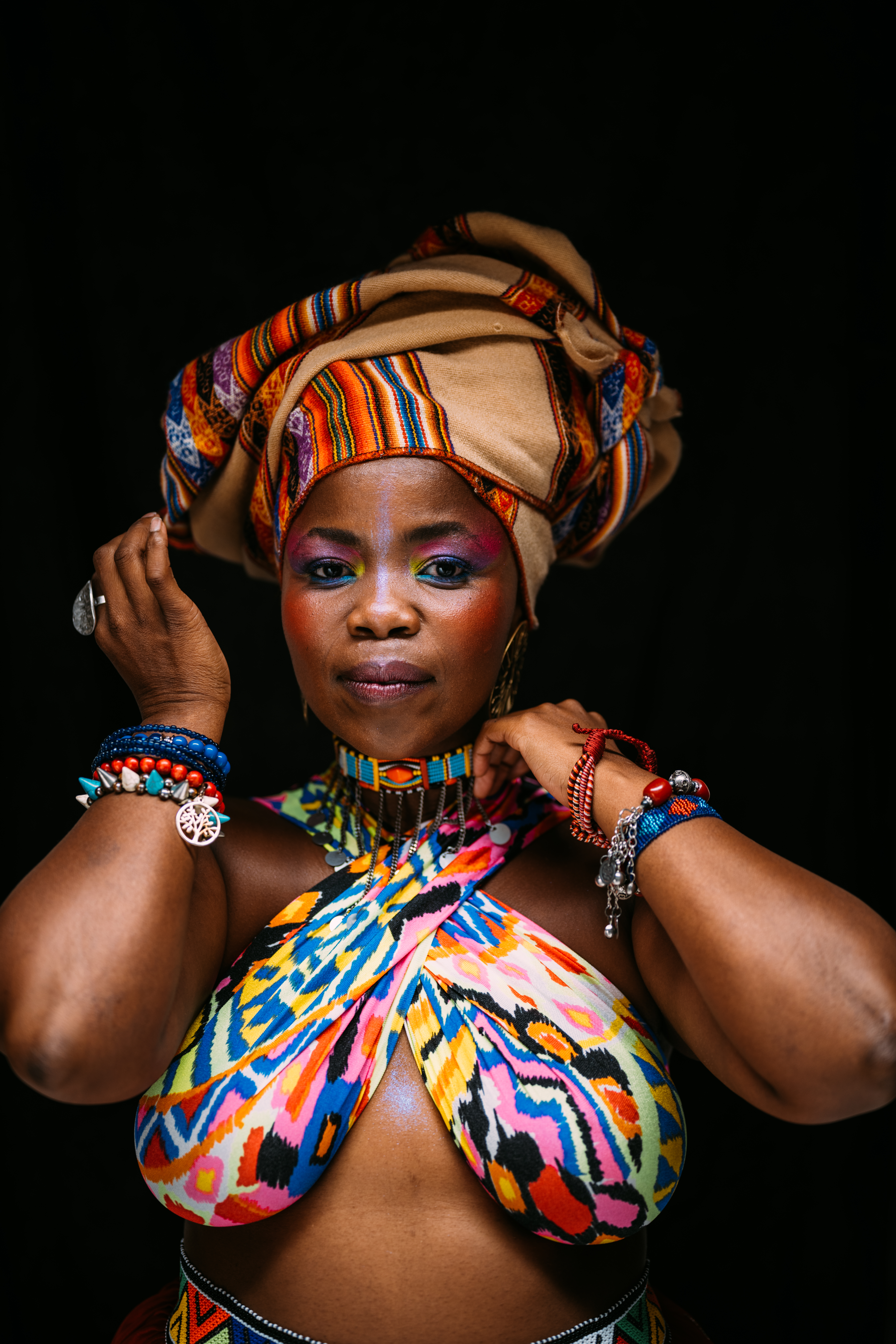
- Zolani Mahola 2023 Promotional Image

Background information
- Also known as: The One Who Sings
- Born: Zolani Mahola; 19 July 1981 (age 45); Port Elizabeth, South Africa
- Origin: Cape Town, South Africa
- Genres: Folk; Afropop; jazz; indie rock
- Occupations: Singer-songwriter; actress
- Instruments: Voice; guitar
- Years active: 2002–present
- Label: Platoon
- Website: zolanimahola.com

Zolani Mahola (born 19 July 1981) is a South African singer, actress, storyteller and inspirational speaker, who previously performed under the moniker The One Who Sings. She is best known as the former lead singer of the pan-African South African music group Freshlyground since 2002. On 15 August 2019, Mahola officially announced the launch of her solo career while the Freshlyground band went on to have their last performance after 17 years on 31 December 2019 at Kirstenbosch Gardens in Cape Town.

== Biography ==
Mahola was born and raised in the city of Port Elizabeth, Eastern Cape, South Africa. She attended Trinity High School (which later amalgamated into St Dominic's Priory School).

In her final year at high school, she worked as a receptionist at Makro during weekends and school holidays. She grew up on Ntshekisa Street, a long and busy street in New Brighton, a township on the outskirts of Port Elizabeth. She stayed with her dad and younger sister between 1999 and 2001. In 2011, Zolani and Freshlyground gave a free concert on Ntshekisa Street as part of their 10th birthday tour.

While studying for a Theatre and Performance degree at the University of Cape Town, she was cast for the lead role in the television drama Tsha-Tsha, which aired on SABC 1. Mahola voiced the character of Zoë in the animated feature film Zambezia (2012), and also recorded the song "Get Up" for the original motion picture soundtrack.

== Music career ==
=== Freshlyground (2002–2019) ===
Mahola and six other musicians formed Freshlyground in Cape Town in 2002.

After Freshlyground published their second album, Nomvula, in 2004, The Sunday Times described Mahola as one of South Africa's best and most inspiring young singers.

She traveled to Cape Town, Durban and Pretoria with English pop singer Robbie Williams in 2006, with Freshlyground performing as Williams' supporting act. The band supported B.B. King as the opening act of his late 2000's (year disputed) performance at the Zénith Paris. They also performed at Radio City Music Hall at the 2009 46664 concert alongside Stevie Wonder, Aretha Franklin, Cyndi Lauper, Jesse Clegg, and the Soweto Gospel Choir.

At the 2010 FIFA World Cup, Mahola, with Freshlyground and Shakira, performed "Waka Waka (This Time for Africa)" in the opening and closing ceremonies. "Waka Waka (This Time for Africa)" was the official song of FIFA World Cup in 2010.

At the Glamour Women of the Year Awards 2011, held on 25 July in Johannesburg, Mahola was among eight women honoured by the South African division of Glamour magazine. Glamour declared both her and her bandmate Kyla-Rose Smith "The Icons" of South African women in 2011. Mahola opened up in 2018 about starting a solo project that would be independent of labels and major sponsors.

=== Solo career (2019–present) ===
On 15 August 2019, Mahola officially announced the launch of her solo career as a musician and public speaker.

In November 2019, Mahola wrote and starred in a one woman play based on her life entitled "The One Who Sings" at the Baxter Theatre in Cape Town. In 2020 she garnered a coveted Fleur Du Cap award as Best Actress in a Musical for her performance in the play.

In January 2020, Mahola performed at Kirstenbosch Gardens with multiple Grammy Award-winning cellist Yo-Yo Ma. The two collaborated with various Capetonian musicians including legendary Xhosa musician and South African "national treasure" Madosini on a song performed at the United Nations in mid 2020 called "Amphibious Soul" in collaboration with the Sea Change Project (creators of My Octopus Teacher), of which Mahola is an ambassador.

Mahola released her first fully fledged solo single on the 27th of November 2020 entitled "Remember Who You Are" ahead of her planned 2021 release of her first solo album. She released the song as part of her ambassadorship of the Give Her A Crown campaign, a female empowerment platform using storytelling to affect the Gender Based Violence pandemic in South Africa.

In October 2021, her single "Wawundithembisile" featuring Sun-El Musician was released. The next month, she released her debut album, Thetha Mama, which features collaborations with other Capetonian artists such as Mr Sakitumi, Derek Gripper, Kenza, and Sun-El Musician.

== Discography ==
as The One Who Sings

- Thetha Mama (2021)
