= Zangalewa =

1986 song by Golden Sounds

"Zangaléwa"

Single by Golden Sounds

from the album Zangalewa
- Language: Fang; Ewondo; Cameroonian Pidgin; French; Douala
- Released: 1986
- Genre: Makossa
- Composers: Jean Paul Zé Bella; Victor Dooh Belley; Emile Kojidie; Annie Anzouer

"Zangaléwa" is a 1986 song by Cameroonian makossa group Golden Sounds, who later changed its name to "Zangalewa", just as the song itself, thanks to its success. The band's members were Jean Paul Zé Bella, Victor Dooh Belley, Emile Kojidie, and Annie Anzouer.

== Background ==
"Zangalewa" is the title track of a 1986 album by Golden Sounds. The band consisted of Jean Paul Zé Bella, Victor Dooh Belley, and Emile Kojidie, who were members of the Presidential Guard of Cameroon, along with Annie Anzouer. According to Zé Bella, the lead singer, the chorus came "from Cameroonian sharpshooters who had created a slang for better communication among them during the Second World War", and the band initially recreated the fast pace of military communication in their first arrangements of the song.

The lyrics of the chorus are directed toward a soldier. The title comes from either "Za engalomwa" in the Fang language, which means "Who sent you?" or "Za anga loé wa" in the Ewondo language, which means "Who called you?" The lyrics include several other languages of Cameroon, including French, Douala, and Cameroonian Pidgin English.

In performances of the song, the band often dresses in military uniforms. They wear pith helmets and stuff their clothes to give the appearance of being well-off as a satire of black soldiers who had collaborated with oppressive white officers. The music video depicts a presidential guard parade. It gained a large viewership as it came out as television became common in Cameroon.

== Legacy ==
Soon after the song's release, it was introduced to Colombia by West African DJs in Barranquilla and Cartagena. It was popularized under the name "The Military" and "El saca lengua" ("he who sticks out his tongue") by DJs fond of African music based in these Colombian cities. In 1988, a version including the chorus "Zamina mina he he" was released in Latin America by Las Chicas del Can, named "El negro no puede", being a dance club hit in Colombia.

The album Zangalewa was named "record of the year" in Cameroon, and in 1993, the Union of African National Television and Radio Organizations awarded it as the year's best African record. The band later changed its own name to Zangalewa.

The song is still used today in Africa by soldiers, policemen, boy scouts, sportsmen, and their supporters, usually during training or for rallying. It is particularly popular in Cameroon, where it is used as a marching song or rallying cry.

=== Shakira's remake: Waka Waka (This Time For Africa) ===
The song became popular worldwide when Shakira released a variant in tribute to African music, titled "Waka Waka (This Time For Africa)" ahead of the 2010 World Cup in South Africa. Internet users, including Cindy Casares of the Latino culture blog Guanabee, noted the origin of the song, leading to allegations of plagiarism. Zé Bella found out about Shakira's version from an acquaintance in France and from Kojidie, who was living in the United States. By then, Golden Sounds had disbanded and Zé Bella had retired. In a 2010 interview with the Cameroon Tribune, he said that he was honored, "because Shakira is an icon of world music", while expressing that the band deserved royalties for the song. Dooh and Zé Bella held a press conference in Douala on 11 May 2010 with their manager, Didier Edo, who had negotiated an out-of-court settlement with Sony Music.

=== Other covers and samples ===
The first commercially released adaptation of the military song was "El Negro No Puede", written by Wilfrido Vargas and performed by Dominican group Las Chicas del Can, in 1982. According to Zé Bella, at least thirty artists made versions of the song, and it was used in an American movie.

Artists who covered or sampled the song include:

- Beatmachine (Suriname) – Samina Mina
- Adane Best
- Los Condes
- Vic Nees
- Tom Pease in Daddy Starts To Dance! (1996)
- Blacks à Braque feat. Tambours Majeurs (from the album Les Hauts de Rouen percutent...) (1996)
- Trafassi (Suriname), "El Negro No Puede (Waka Waka)" (from the album Tropicana (disc 1) (1997)
- Laughing Pizza in Pizza Party (2004)
- Nakk in Zamina (2006)
- Zaman in Zamina (2006)
- Didier Awadi – "Zamouna" (from the album Sunugaal) (2008)
- Vampire Weekend – I'm Goin' Down (2010)
- Shakira feat. Freshlyground - "Waka Waka (This Time for Africa)" (2010)
- BB DJ – Enfant Poli
- Mr. Tucker – Zamina Zamina Pele
- Massamba Diouf
- Selebobo – Zamina (2013)
