= 1984 Cameroonian coup attempt =

Attempt to depose President Paul Biya by presidential palace guards

An attempted coup d'état occurred in Cameroon in 1984, when presidential palace guards unsuccessfully tried to overthrow President Paul Biya. The fighting that resulted began on April 6, 1984, and ended several days later. The coup attempt is widely viewed as one of the most crucial events in the history of Cameroon since independence in 1960.

== Background ==
After nearly 23 years as President of Cameroon, Ahmadou Ahidjo resigned for unclear reasons in November 1982 and was succeeded by Prime Minister Paul Biya. Despite his resignation, Ahidjo remained President of the Cameroonian National Union (CNU), the ruling party, and retained enormous political influence. Although Ahidjo's resignation was voluntary and he was initially happy to see Biya take his place as President (although Biya was a Christian from the south and Ahidjo was a Muslim from the north), a power struggle between the two developed in 1983. Ahidjo attempted to assert his supremacy by arguing that the party should make policy decisions and that the state should merely implement them, but Biya in turn pointed out that the constitution assigned responsibility for determining policy to the President of the Republic. Ahidjo went into exile in July 1983, and on August 22, 1983, Biya publicly accused Ahidjo of plotting a coup, while simultaneously dismissing two key Ahidjo loyalists—Prime Minister Bello Bouba Maigari and Minister of State for the Armed Forces Maikano Abdoulaye—from the government. Ahidjo bitterly criticized Biya from exile, accusing him of paranoia and misrule, and he resigned as President of the CNU. In February 1984 he was sentenced to death in absentia for alleged involvement in the 1983 coup plot, although the sentence was subsequently commuted to life imprisonment by Biya.

In early April 1984, President Biya ordered a transfer of all presidential palace guards who came from the predominantly Muslim north, probably because he had been alerted to a coup plot involving those soldiers. Dissident members of the palace guard promptly reacted to the order by rebelling against Biya; the plot's leaders may have been forced to launch their coup attempt prematurely due to Biya's order to relocate the soldiers away from the capital, Yaoundé. An important factor was Cameroon Air Force, which remained loyal to the president. After several days of heavy fighting in Yaoundé, Biya loyalists defeated the rebels. Estimates of the death toll ranged from 71 (according to the government) to about 1,000. More than 1,000 accused dissidents were arrested shortly afterward, and 35 of them were immediately sentenced to death and executed. The government declared a state of emergency lasting six months in Yaoundé and the surrounding region.

Although Ahidjo was not overtly involved in the coup attempt, it was widely believed that he had masterminded it from exile. The failure of the coup attempt was followed by Biya's full consolidation of power; in 1985 he relaunched the CNU as the Cameroon People's Democratic Movement (CPDM).
