= Maikano Abdoulaye =

Cameroonian politician

Roving Ambassador of Cameroon
- In office 2009–2011

Government Delegate to the Urban Commune of Garoua
- In office 1996–2009

Minister of State for the Armed Forces
- In office 1980–1983

Minister of Animal Husbandry and Animal Industries
- In office 1975–1978

Minister of Planning and Urban and Regional Planning
- In office 1972–1975

Minister of the Civil Service
- In office 1970–1972

Personal details
- Born: 1932 Gaschiga, Garoua, Bénoué Department, Cameroon
- Died: 21 October 2011 (aged 78–79) Garoua, Cameroon
- Occupation: Veterinarian, politician, diplomat

Maikano Abdoulaye (1932 – 21 October 2011) was a Cameroonian politician. A veterinarian by profession, he held various positions in the government of Cameroon from 1970 to 1983, ultimately serving as Minister of State for the Armed Forces. Later, he was the Government Delegate to the Urban Commune of Garoua from 1996 to 2009, and in 2009 he was appointed as Roving Ambassador.

== Education and early career ==
Maikano was born in Gaschiga, located in the Garoua arrondissement of Benoue Department. He received his primary education at Garoua's regional school and attended secondary school at Bongor in Chad from 1947 to 1948. As a Muslim, he learned to recite the Koran as a child, although he did so without any knowledge of Arabic. He was included in the first group of students from northern Cameroon to be sent to France in 1950; the group was sent by Ahmadou Ahidjo, who was a delegate in the Representative Assembly of Cameroon. After completing veterinary studies in France, he returned to Cameroon in July 1964; by that point Cameroon had obtained its independence, with Ahidjo as its president.

From 27 July 1964 to January 1966, Maikano was deputy head of the northern sector of animal husbandry at Maroua. He was appointed as Director of Animal Husbandry and Animal Industries at East Cameroon's Secretariat of State for Animal Husbandry in 1966.

== Political career ==
Maikano was first appointed to the government of Cameroon as Minister of the Civil Service on 12 June 1970. He was instead appointed as Minister of Planning and Urban and Regional Planning (Aménagement du territoire) on 3 July 1972, and then as Minister of Animal Husbandry and Animal Industries on 30 June 1975. Three years later, on 2 May 1978, he was moved back to his former post as Minister of the Civil Service. His name was officially changed from Abdoulaye Maikano to Maikano Abdoulaye on 9 March 1979. He was appointed as Minister of the Armed Forces on 17 July 1980, and he was promoted to the rank of Minister of State on 7 January 1982, while retaining the armed forces portfolio. He was Acting Prime Minister for a time in 1982.

Maikano was viewed as a loyalist of Ahidjo, who was president until resigning on 4 November 1982; after he resigned, Ahidjo was succeeded by Prime Minister Paul Biya. According to Maikano, he was not informed of Ahidjo's resignation in advance and learned of it along with the rest of the country; he also said that Ahidjo called him and other members of the northern elite into a meeting and asked them to "work with [Biya] as you have with me". Maikano initially retained his post as Minister of State for the Armed Forces under President Biya, but a political feud soon developed between Ahidjo and Biya. Biya dismissed some Ahidjo loyalists from the government on 18 June 1983, although Maikano still kept his post; Ahidjo reacted angrily to the changes and called the ministers from northern Cameroon to a meeting at his home later on the same day. At that meeting, he told the northern ministers that they should resign from the government, hoping that by doing so they would undermine Biya. Maikano also held a meeting in Yaoundé at the home of Ibrahim Wadjiri, the Delegate-General of the Gendarmerie, at which he explained Ahidjo's plan to top military officers from the north, while also telling the officers that they should stay out of the situation due to its political nature. Ahidjo did not go forward with his plan, however, and he went into exile on 19 July 1983.

A month later, on 22 August 1983, Biya publicly accused Ahidjo of plotting a coup d'état; on the same occasion, he dismissed Maikano and another Ahidjo loyalist, Prime Minister Bello Bouba Maigari, from the government. Gilbert Andze Tsoungui was appointed to replace Maikano. When dismissing Maikano and Bello Bouba, Biya did not explicitly accuse them of involvement in the coup plot, but the timing of their dismissal nevertheless implied that they were suspected of involvement. Ahidjo was tried in absentia for the 1983 coup plot and was sentenced to death by a tribunal on 28 February 1984; on that occasion, the tribunal proposed that Maikano and Bello Bouba should also be placed on trial. However, Biya halted the legal proceedings against them.

Although Maikano was suspected of involvement in the April 1984 coup attempt, which failed after heavy fighting in Yaoundé, he was subsequently appointed as Director of the National Veterinary Laboratory (LANAVET), located near Garoua, on 14 September 1985.

Maikano retired on 31 December 1993, but Biya called him out of retirement to serve as Government Delegate to the Urban Commune of Garoua in 1996. Biya appointed Maikano to that post following the victory of the opposition National Union for Democracy and Progress (UNDP) in Garoua's municipal election; the atmosphere in the city was tense and Maikano, as the representative of the government, was greeted with hostility from the UNDP. According to Maikano, however, he was not interested in confrontation and intended only to improve the situation in Garoua through dialogue and his experience.

During his tenure as Government Delegate, Maikano said that he remained on good terms with President Biya, although they rarely met. He credited Biya with helping him when he went to France for medical treatment. In his capacity as Government Delegate, Maikano was present for the inauguration of the American Corner at the Garoua Municipal Library on 13 December 2006 and expressed gratitude for the donation of materials and resources by the United States Embassy. Maikano remained in his post as Government Delegate until a successor took office on 1 March 2009; on that occasion, he was praised and credited with restoring calm to the city. Maikano was then appointed as a Roving Ambassador by President Biya on 30 June 2009.

== Personal life ==
Maikano described himself as "a practicing Muslim but not fanatical" in a December 2003 interview: "I respect religious morality, that's all". He did not smoke or drink. As of 2003, he had one wife, to whom he had been married since around 1960, and no children. Regarding his career and lifestyle, he said in 2003 that "I've never had boundless ambitions. I've always led a modest life."

On 21 October 2011, Maikano died of an illness at his home in the Marouaré neighborhood of Garoua; he was about 79 years old. As a Muslim, he was promptly buried the next morning.
