= Presidential Guard (Cameroon) =

Military protection unit

The Cameroon Presidential Guard (French: Garde présidentielle du Cameroun, GP), is a military protection unit of the Cameroon Armed Forces. Unlike the Republican Guard, which existed until early 1984 and was placed under the authority of the General Delegate for the Gendarmerie, the GP reports directly to the President.

== History ==
In the spring of 1984, the presidential Republican Guard became responsible for an attempted coup d'état against President Paul Biya. The violence ended several days later and resulted in the execution of 35 members of the guard as well as the declaration of a 6-month state of emergency in Yaoundé and the surrounding region. Accusations arose of former President Ahmadou Ahidjo's involvement, given his ethnic connection to the majority Hausa guard. After the coup, the GC's ethnically Fulani and Hausa personnel were replaced with personnel from the Bulu subgroup of the Beti-Pahuin peoples.

An indirect result of the coup was the foundation of Golden Sounds (also known as Zangalewa) in November 1984, identifying as a makossa group formed from by active members of the presidential guard. It originally included musicians such as Jean Paul Zé Bella, Dooh Belley, Luc Eyebe and Emile Kojidie. They were known for their comical musical entertainment, often dressing in military uniforms and pith helmets. It is most famous for its 1986 song, "Zangalewa".

In December 2012, a video was published by a site run by Cameroonians expats in Belgium, depicting presidential guards beating up a protester who refused to move off a road that was used for President Paul Biya's motorcade through the capital.

== Purpose ==
It engages in the following ceremonial and protective duties:

- Protecting the President and governmental buildings
- Providing military security
- Participating in national events
  - State visits
  - Military parades
  - Events at the National Assembly

=== List of commanders ===
- Raymond Charles (2013-Present)
- Raymond Thomas (2011-2013)
- Jean Mendoua (1999-2001)
- Jean Paul Mengo (2001-2011)
- Titus Egobo (1985-1999)

== Equipment ==
The government of Cameroon uses Israeli armored vehicles,
