= Mine bengidzakiwe =

Traditional ceremonial song in Swaziland

"Mine Bengidzakiwe" is a traditional song sung in native ceremonies in Swaziland, which became a local hit in 2007.

== Background ==
"Mine Bengidzakiwe" is a traditional song whose composer is anonymous. The song is still sung in Swaziland's ceremonies. The direct translation of the title is "I was drunk". It concerns a typical African homestead where a husband has two wives. One wife locks the other in a "hut" (traditional kitchen) in the hope of being alone with the husband. A third person says "You should never lock someone in the hut" and the culprit responds with the line, "I was drunk".

== Recording ==
"Mine Bengidzakiwe", was recorded by artists Deborah Steenkamp and Sifiso S-tone Magagula, in Johannesburg, South Africa, reportedly in the living room of producer Sabside with minimal studio equipment. It was remixed by Sabside and became a hit from late 2007 to 2008. It was licensed to DJ Christos who later released it as part of a compilation Edladleni for the Sdunkero label. It was also licensed to Afrotainment, a Durban based label and was later released under a compilation for DJ CNDO.

== Conflict ==
Since its release the origin of the song has been a matter of controversy in the music industry, apparently because of the number of licensors involved.
