= Kyla-Rose Smith =

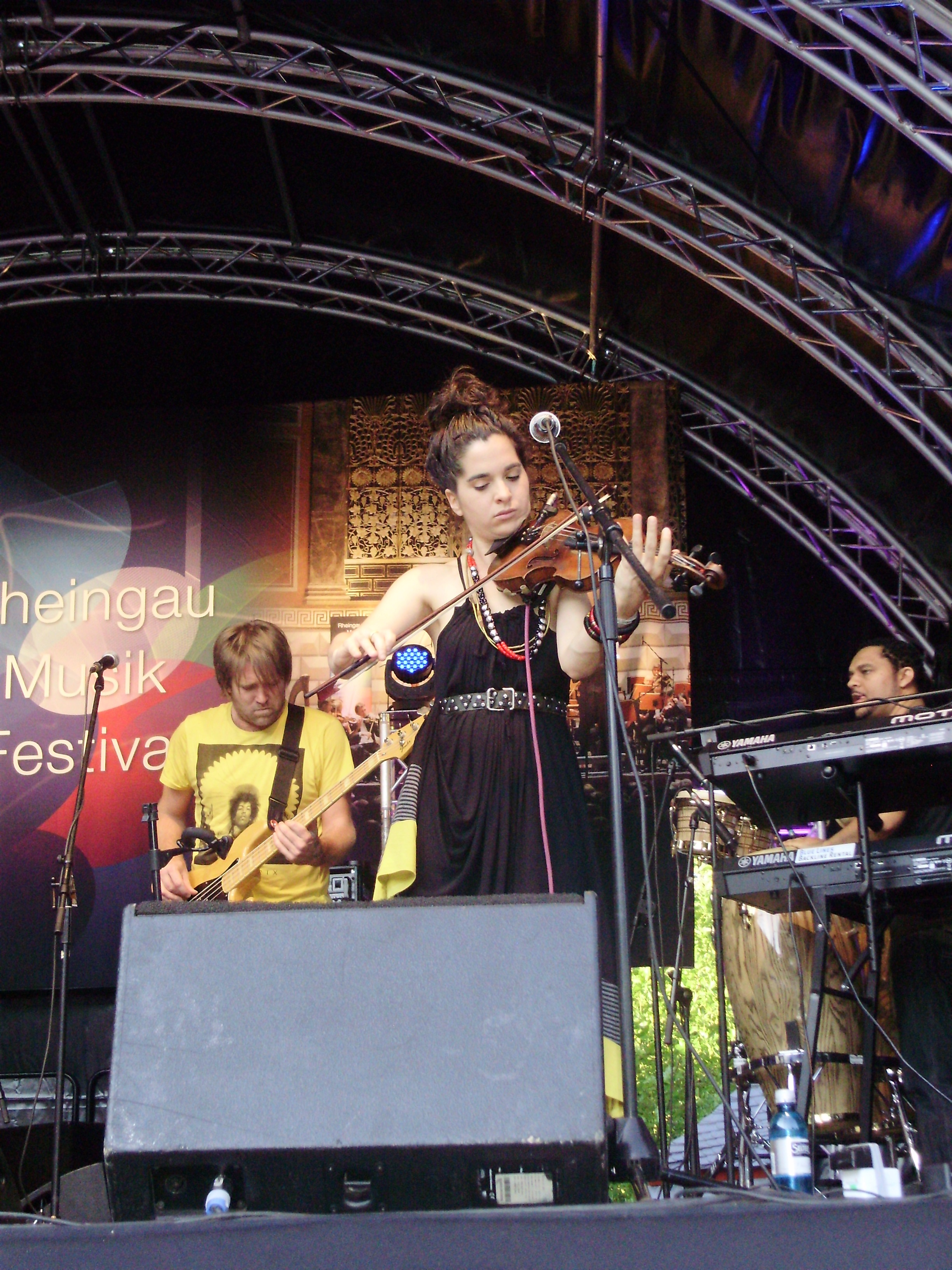
- Kyla-Rose Smith plays violin onstage with Freshlyground at the Rheingau Musik Festival. (11 August 2012)

Background information
- Born: 10 September 1982 (age 43); Johannesburg
- Origin: Cape Town
- Genres: Afropop, fusion, hip hop
- Occupations: Violinist, vocalist, dancer
- Instruments: Violin, voice, piano
- Label: Sony BMG Africa
- Website: www.freshlyground.com#/the%20band/

Kyla-Rose Smith (born 10 September 1982) is a South African violinist, singer, and dancer, she performs with the Afropop musical ensemble Freshlyground, and with Kolo Novo Movie Band, a large ensemble that performs fusion music based on the music of Southeastern Europe.

She is a former member of the hip hop music group Tumi and the Volume, and of the dance troupe Vuyani Dance Theatre. She left Vuyani Dance Theatre in 2003 when she decided to join Freshlyground.

Smith grew up in a suburb of Johannesburg with her brother (Tymon) and sister (Sydelle). She later trained in musical performance at the University of Cape Town.

At the Glamour Women of the Year Awards 2011 held on 25 July in Johannesburg, Kyla-Rose Smith was among eight women honoured by the South African division of Glamour. Glamour declared Smith and her bandmate Zolani Mahola "The Icons" of South African women in 2011.
