= Adane Best =

- Born: Joseph Amoah; Adedenkpo, Accra
- Genre: Highlife
- Occupations: singer, songwriter
- Years active: 35

Joseph Amoah, professionally called Adane Best, is a contemporary Ghanaian Highlife, singer, and producer.

== Early life and education ==
Adane Best was born in Adedenkpo, Palladium a community in the Greater Accra Region of Ghana. He was born to Macauley Amoah, a Fante and Christiana Ama Sarfowaa, from Kwahu. Adane attended Teacher Afio Kindergarten and Amamomo 1 Primary School and Amamomo 1 and II mixed in Accra for his middle school education. In 1996, he proceeded to the Otublohum Secondary School for his secondary school education. He stopped and later attended Osu Presbyterian Secondary School in 1987 but later stopped schooling.

== Music career ==
=== Recordings with Beautiful Barristers of King Bruce (1980 -1991) ===
In 1980, shortly after leaving school abruptly, Adane Best joined the Beautiful Barristers of King Bruce as a backing vocalist.

=== Solo career (1992–2025) ===
Adane Best first came unto the Ghanaian mainstream music scene in 1992, when he released his debut album, Ayittey. The album was inspired by the personal experiences of the Adane's brother, who had travelled to Nigeria seeking improved economic prospects. After encountering severe difficulties there, he was deported back to Ghana. Upon his return, the brother strongly advised the artist against travelling to Lagos, Nigeria, citing the harsh conditions he had endured. He instead urged the artist to remain patient and to believe that success could be attained within Ghana itself, asserting that divine providence could enable one to prosper without leaving the country. That inspiration would later give him a hit and become popular in Ghana.

In 1994, he released Se Wo Bre, Wa nu Pe Asem in 1996, Rabbi in 1999, Maafio, Soja Go Soja Come both in 2002, Ayekoo in 2004, Adesa in 2008 and Mamamia in 2023.

== Legacy ==
Adane has inspired many old and new artistes around the country. In 2023, while picking up an award for Artist of the Year at 2023 Ghana Music Awards ceremony, Black Sherif eulogized him by singing one of his songs as inspiration.

== Awards and nominations ==
Sources

- ^{^[a]}Ghana Music Awards.

Organization	Year	Category	Nominated work	Result	Ref.
ECRAG Awards	1994	Best Dance Music	—	Won	
Ghana Music Awards	2003	Hiplife Song of the Year	Maafio	Won	^{[a]}
Ghana Music Awards	2003	Highlife Song of the Year	Maafio	Won	^{[a]}
Ghana Music Awards	2005	Highlife Highlife Song of the Year	Ayekoo	Nominated	
Ghana Music Awards	2008	Highlife Album of the Year	Adesa	Won	^{[a]}

== Discography ==
=== Albums ===
Tape	Year of Release
Ayittey	1992
Se Wo Bre	1994
Wa nu Pe Asem	1996
Rabbi	1999
Maafio	2002
Soja Go Soja Come	2002
Ayekoo	2004
Adesa	2008
Mamamia	2023
