= 2010 FIFA World Cup opening ceremony =

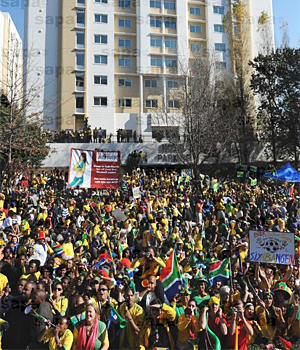
- Crowds near Sandton City two days prior to the opening ceremony.
- Date: 11 June 2010
- Time: 14:00 South African Standard Time (UTC+2)
- Location: Soccer City, Nasrec, Johannesburg, South Africa

The 2010 FIFA World Cup opening ceremony took place on 11 June at the Soccer City stadium in Johannesburg, two hours before the opening match of the tournament. The ceremony started at 2pm local time and lasted 40 minutes. The ceremony involved 1500 performers, including American superstar R.Kelly, Thandiswa Mazwai, Timothy Moloi, Hugh Masekela, Khaled, Femi Kuti, Osibisa, TKZee, Hip Hop Pantsula and the Soweto Gospel Choir. During the ceremony, the tournament was declared opened by President Jacob Zuma.

== Notable attendees ==
Although in frail health and 91 years old, the former South African president Nelson Mandela was scheduled to attend the opening ceremony, however had pulled out after the death of his great-granddaughter, who was killed in a car crash earlier in the day. A pre-recorded message appeared on the stadium screens instead.

Dignitaries from 4 organizations and 24 countries attended the event, which included 20 heads of state and 18 eminent persons. Alongside the FIFA President Sepp Blatter and the then South African president Jacob Zuma, other delegates included the South African religious leader Desmond Tutu, the United Nations secretary-general Ban Ki-moon, the Mexican president Felipe Calderón, Prince Albert of Monaco.

=== Guests ===
Official guests included :

- Ban Ki-moon, Secretary General of the United Nations
- Jean Ping, Chairperson of the African Union Commission
- Sepp Blatter, President of FIFA
- Thomas Bach, Vice President of International Olympic Committee
- Jacob Zuma, President of South Africa
- Felipe Calderon, President of Mexico
- Joe Biden, Vice President of the United States
- Evo Morales, President of Bolivia
- Federico Franco, Vice President of Paraguay
- Jose Eduardo dos Santos, President of Angola
- Viktor Orban, Prime Minister of Hungary
- Albert II, Sovereign Prince of Monaco
- Laurent Gbagbo, President of Ivory Coast
- Armando Guebuza, President of Mozambique
- (Sahrawi Arab Democratic Republic) Mohamed Abdelaziz, President of Sahrawi Republic
- Bakri Hassan Salih, Vice President of Sudan
- (Republic of the Congo) Denis Sassou Nguesso, President of Congo
- Joseph Kabila, President of Democratic Republic of the Congo
- Saad Hariri, Prime Minister of Lebanon
- Letsie III, King of Lesotho
- Ali Bongo Ondimba, President of Gabon
- Robert Mugabe, President of Zimbabwe
- John Atta Mills, President of Ghana
- Mwai Kibaki, President of Kenya
- Abdelaziz Bouteflika, President of Algeria
- Goodluck Jonathan, President of Nigeria
- Paul Biya, President of Cameroon
- Meles Zenawi, Prime Minister of Ethiopia

Attended as eminent persons included :

- Kofi Annan, former Secretary General of the United Nations
- Alpha Oumar Konare, former Chairperson of the African Union Commission
- Kenneth Kaunda, former President of Zambia
- Morgan Tsvangirai, Prime Minister of Zimbabwe
- Raila Odinga, Prime Minister of Kenya
- Desmond Tutu, Religious leader of South Africa

== Opening celebration concert ==
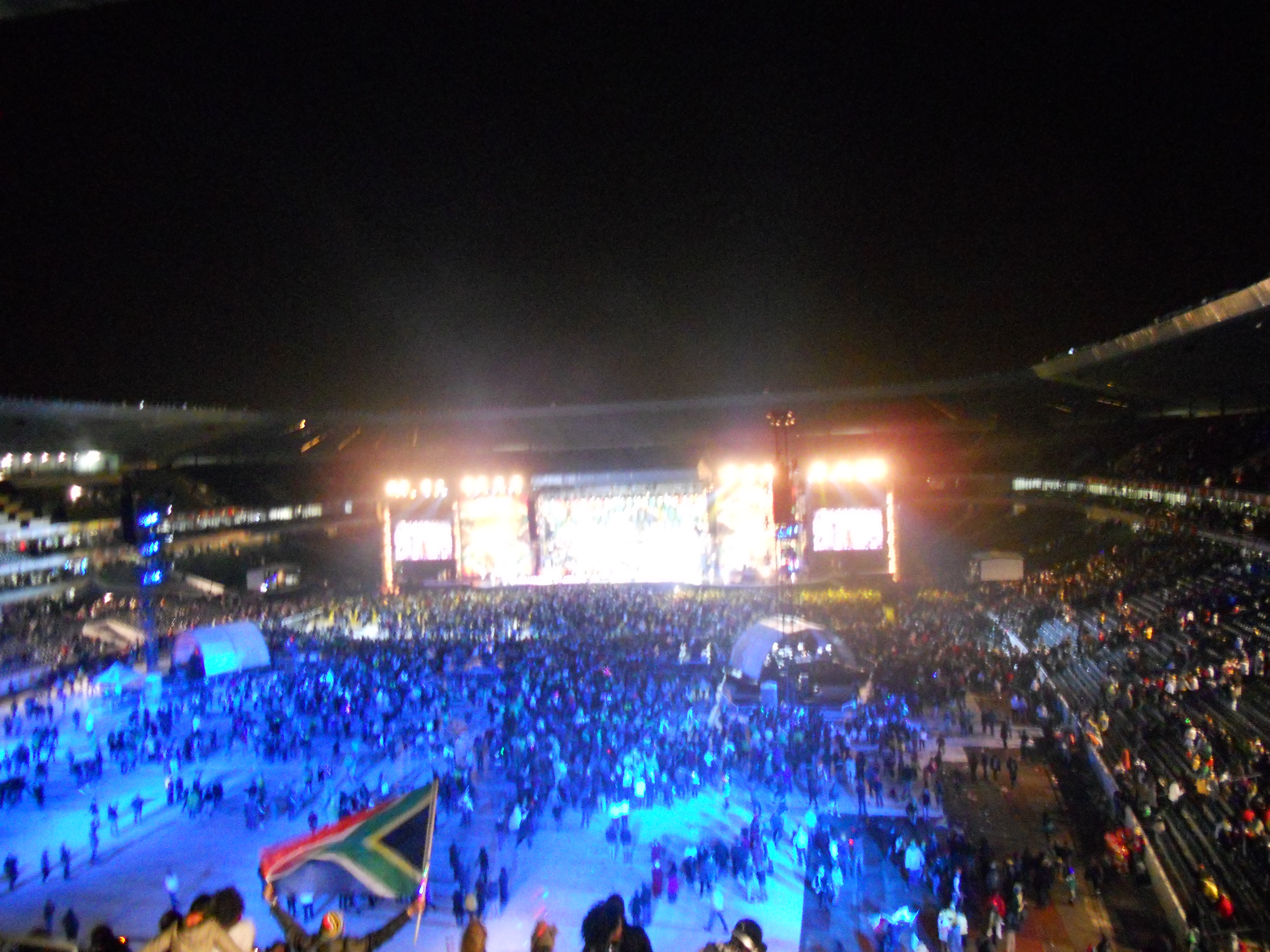
The opening celebration concert at the Orlando Stadium.

One day prior to the ceremony, the first-ever FIFA World Cup Kick-Off Celebration Concert took place on 10 June at Orlando Stadium in Soweto. Warm-up acts including Goldfish, 340ml and Tumi Molekane performed before the internationally televised portion of the concert began at 20:00 SAST. The three-hour main event included performances by Alicia Keys, Amadou & Mariam, Angelique Kidjo, The Black Eyed Peas, BLK JKS, The Dave Matthews Band, Freshlyground, Hugh Masekela, Juanes, K'Naan, Lira, Shakira, The Parlotones, Tinariwen, Vieux Farka Touré and Vusi Mahlasela.
