= Las Chicas del Can =

Dominican merengue band

- Also known as: Miriam Cruz Y Las Chicas
- Origin: Santo Domingo, Dominican Republic
- Genre: Merengue
- Years active: 1981–1999
- Members: Miriam Cruz (1982–1992); Eunice Betances (1982–1992); Teresa Domínguez (1981–1992); María Alejandra Tuesca Palmett "Tueska"
- Past members: Belkis Concepción (1981–1985); Verónica Medina (1982–1986); Vilma Frias (1982–1989); Carmen De Leon (1986–1987); Heidy Bello (1988–1991); Xiomara Queliz (1986–1993); Roxana Eusebio (1991-1993); Austria Tejada (1988–1994); Yesenia Delgado Lobo (1992–1996); Gladys Quero (1985–1992); Grissel Baez (1991–1998); Michell Flores (1991–1998); Florángel Del Villar (1991–1998); Jessica Castro (1992–1993); Amarilis Garcia (1986–1987); Fiordaliza Cruz (1988-1990)

Las Chicas Del Can were an all-female merengue group from Dominican Republic. Originally created by pianist Belkis Concepción, several teams of female vocalists and musicians have alternately performed under the name Las Chicas del Can throughout the group's history.

== History ==
Founded in 1981, Las Chicas del Can performed a number of hits throughout the eighties, and a great number of their singles and albums achieved gold and/or platinum status. Hits such as "El Negro No Puede," "La Media María," "Sukaína," "Juana la Cubana," "Culeca," "Ta' Pillao," "Fuego," "Fiebre," and "Las Pequeñas Cosas" are now regarded as merengue classics.

Las Chicas Del Can had tremendous success, receiving platinum records and gold records and made extensive tours around the world and Europe, including Venezuela, Ecuador, Colombia, Peru, Puerto Rico, the United States, Holland and others.

The dance "Juana La Cubana" was popularized by the eternal Cuban Teresa Dominguez. The album Juana la Cubana received a platinum record in Venezuela in 1988 for 100,000 copies sold and the single sold a further 50,000 copies, combining into one of the most recognized works in the entire trajectory of Las Chicas Del Can

Pianist Belkis Concepción left the group early to go solo in 1985. Singers Miriam Cruz and Eunice Betances then teamed up and got vocal support from, among others, Verónica Medina. Verónica Medina herself then went solo in 1987.

In 1988 singer Heidy Bello (replacing Verónica Medina), joined Las Chicas Del Can but was replaced in 1991 by singers Arismar Eduardo and Rosana Eusebio.

In 1992, the group reinvented itself under the name Míriam Cruz y Las Chicas. The first year under that name, they produced a successful album titled Nueva Vida featuring a hit song written by Juan Luis Guerra, "Te Propongo." Later that year, "La Loba" was also well received by merengue fans. A European tour (1993-1994) soon followed. In 1994 Miriam Cruz y Las Chicas scored another hit with the song "Con Agua de Sal (OTI)," and 1995 included another successful European tour.

Meanwhile, the original name was kept alive by a music industry manager who discovered a group of new and talented young ladies who would carry the torch for Las Chicas del Can. In 1993, Michell Flores, Grissel Baez and Florángel del Villar teamed up to keep the legacy alive. Due to the situation not entirely clear among fans, the new girls were hailed as the "Monumental". They started traveling around the globe, covering the band's original repertoire with songs like "Juana la Cubana". This second line-up of Las Chicas Del Can quickly became a successful act in their own right with hit tunes such as "Voy Pa'llá," "Hacer El Amor Con Otro," "Celoso," "Explosivo" and "Sin Compromiso." After the albums "Botando Chispas" (1994) and "Derramando Sueños" (1996) lead singer Michell Flores went solo and the 2nd line-up of Las Chicas del Can disbanded in 1998.

Las Chicas del Can was eventually reformed a third time in 1999, but this particular group was never able to achieve the success of earlier line-ups. To this date, the first line-up of Las Chicas Del Can (which featured Míriam Cruz, Eunice Betances and Teresa Domínguez) has proven to be the most successful line-up.

== Discography ==
- Belkis y Las Chicán (1982, Karen Records)
- Belkis y Las Chicán (1984, Karen Records)
- Chicán (1985, Karen Records)
- Pegando Fuego (1986, Karen Records)
- Mi General (1987, Sonotone Records)
- Caribe (1988, Sonotone Records)
- Sumbaleo (1990, Sonotone/Bomba Records)
- Juana La Cubana (1990, Bomba Records)
- Nada Común (1991, TH-Rodven Records/Sonotone Records)
- Explosivo (1992, TH-Rodven Records)
- Nueva Vida (1993, Karen Records)
- Platino (1994, Rodven Records)
- Botando Chispas (1994)
- Con Mucha Potencia (1994)
- Los Años Dorados (1995, Karen Publishing Co.)
- Oro Merenguero (1996, Rodven/PolyGram Records)
- Derramando Sueños (1996, Rodven/PolyGram Records)
- Las Chicán (1997, Palma Music, Inc.)
- Nuevos Remixes (1997)
- Todo Éxitos (1998, Palma Music)
- Te Quiero Ver (1998, Pa'ti Pa'mi records)
- Botando Chispa! (1999, Palma Music)
- Caribe (1999, Palma Music)
- 17 Años (2000, Palma Music)
- Lo Mejor de: Las Chicas del Can (2002, Orfeón Videovox, S.A.)
