= Golden Sounds =

Cameroonian makossa group

- Also known as: Zangaléwa
- Origin: Cameroon
- Genres: Makossa
- Years active: 1984–c. 2000

Golden Sounds, later known as Zangaléwa, was a makossa group from Cameroon, formed in 1984 by active members of Cameroon's presidential guard: Jean Paul Zé Bella, Dooh Belley, Luc Eyebe and Emile Kojidie. The group is most famous for its song, "Zangaléwa", which was a huge hit in Africa after its release in 1986, and was revived in 2010 when Shakira sampled it for the 2010 FIFA World Cup as Waka Waka (This Time for Africa).

== History ==
The Golden Sounds originate from the Orchestra of the Republican Guard of Cameroon's Presidency. Four gendarmes from the orchestra provided comical musical entertainment, often dressing in military uniforms, wearing pith helmets and stuffing their clothes with pillows to appear like they had swollen bottoms from riding the train and fat stomachs from eating too much. The song was also popular in Colombia where it was known as "The Military", and brought to the country by West African DJs. The song made its band so popular that the band itself later changed the name of the group to Zangaléwa, which means in Ewondo, a Cameroonian language, "Who Called You?" (Za'nga'lowa).

Two civilians, Robert Kero and the female singer Annie Anzouer later joined the group. In 1993, Annie Anzouer was replaced in the lineup by Viviane Etienne. Etienne also left the group afterwards to pursue a solo career. The group also consists of several other supporting members.

The group disbanded around 2000. Jean Paul Ze Bella retired from the presidential guard in 2002 after 30 years of service, but his song stands as an icon of Cameroonian military history. Ze Bella died from cancer on 15 January 2023 at the age of 70.

== Discography ==
=== Albums ===
Year	Album
1986	Zangaléwa
1989	Casque Colonial
1991	Caporal Grillé
1995	Yélé-Yélé

=== Singles ===
- "Zangaléwa" (1986)
- "Maladie Difficile" (1986)
- "Un bébé" (1991)

== Awards ==
Year	Award
1986	Record of the Year (Cameroon)
1993	African Record of the Year (URTNA)
