= Freshlyground =

South African Afro-Fusion band

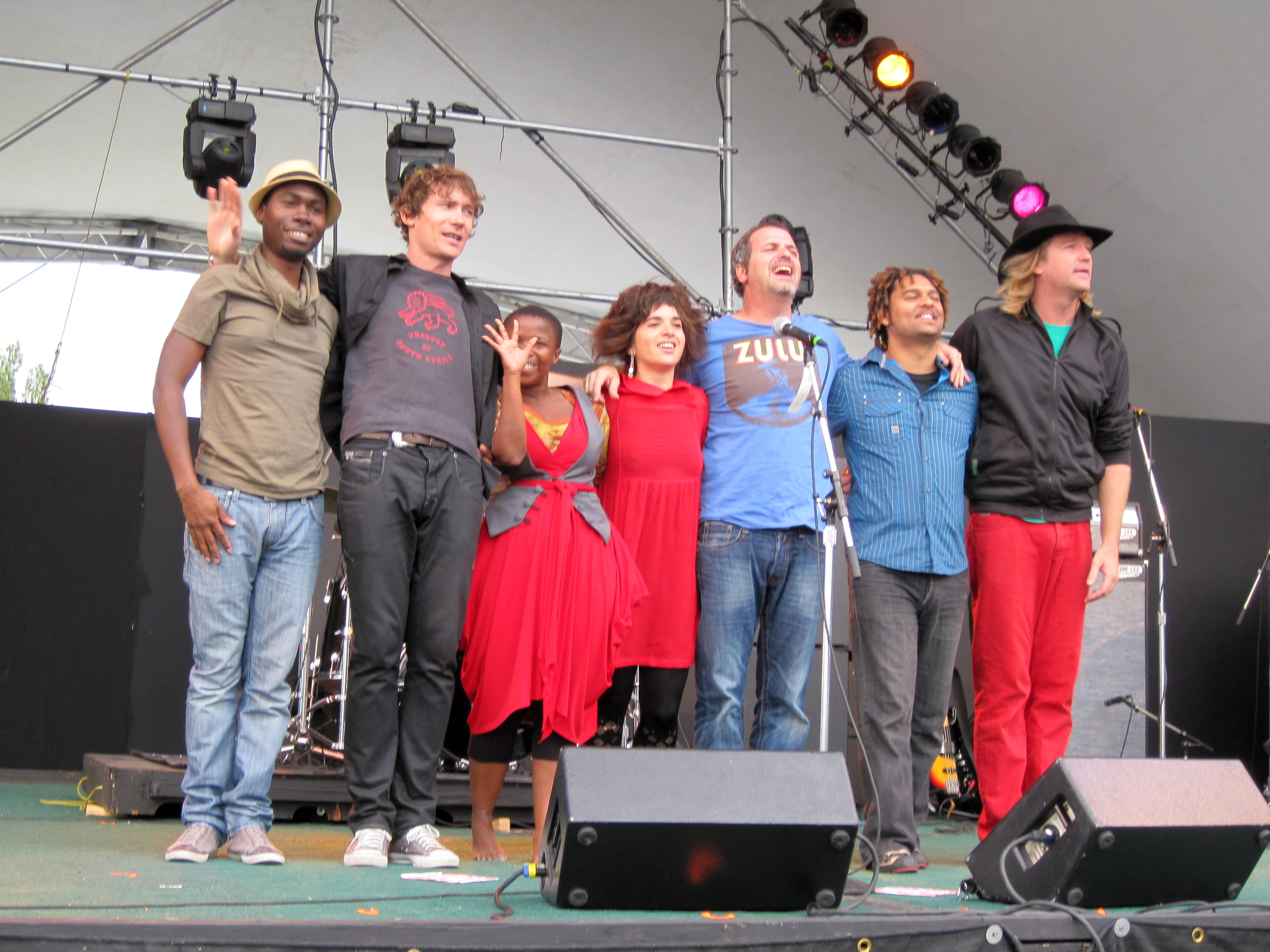
- Concert on 15 July 2011

Background information
- Origin: Cape Town, South Africa
- Genres: Afro fusion; folk; afropop; jazz; electronic
- Years active: 2002–2019, 2024-present
- Labels: Sony BMG Africa; Freeground
- Past members: Zolani Mahola; Kyla-Rose Smith; Aron Turest-Swartz; Simon Attwell; Peter Cohen; Julio Sigauque; Josh Hawks; Seredeal "Shaggy" Scheepers
- Website: freshlyground.com

Freshlyground is an Afro-fusion pop band formed in Cape Town, South Africa, in 2002. Freshlyground is best known for writing, performing and playing the instrumentals of the afrofusion and soca single "Waka Waka (This Time for Africa)" alongside Colombian singer Shakira, which received worldwide recognition. The music video featuring the group has achieved over 4.2 billion views on YouTube, which has resulted in it becoming one of the most-viewed videos on the platform. After a five-year hiatus, Freshlyground announced their return in late 2024 with new lead vocalist Mbali Makhoba.

== Early years ==
Freshlyground's members cite diverse multi-racial, multi-cultural and multi-national backgrounds inclusive of South Africa, Mozambique and Zimbabwe. Violinist and backing vocalist Kyla-Rose Smith was associated with afrofusion dancer Gregory Maqoma's dance company, The Vuyani Dance Theatre, where she performed at the Centre National de la Danse in Paris and co-wrote music while serving as the principal violinist. Smith pursued music studies throughout her schooling and focused on jazz during her time at university. At 15, Simon Attwell was a flautist in the Zimbabwe National Orchestra, later earning a scholarship to the Chethams School of Music in Manchester by age 17. Aron Turest-Swartz studied piano with Merton Barrow at the Jazz Workshop in Cape Town during his teenage years before transitioning to drums and percussion in Dublin in 1998. Lead singer Zolani Mahola had studied drama at the University of Cape Town and secured the lead role of Boniswa in the SABC1 television drama series Tsha Tsha. Drummer Peter Cohen formerly served as a drummer for Mango Groove. Mango Groove, which formed in 1984, is a South African musical ensemble comprising 11 members that blends pop with township music genres such as marabi. Josh Hawks, a backing vocalist and the bassist, was a prominent figure in the early '90s scene and played a pivotal role in the success of both The Streaks and the Zap Dragons.

== Career ==
=== Jika Jika (2003) ===
Freshlyground released their debut album, Jika Jika, in early 2003. The commercial success of this album launched their career through their reputation as a vibrant South African band. The exposure from this album resulted in an invitation for the band to perform at both the Harare International Festival of the Arts and the Robben Island African Festival. This album was remixed by Keith Farquharson, remastered by Chris Athens and re-released in 2008.

=== Nomvula (2004–2006) ===
In 2004, Freshlyground participated in the opening of the Parliament of South Africa by performing before then-president Thabo Mbeki in an event organised as a celebration of 10 years of democracy in South Africa.

At the Harare International Festival of the Arts, Freshlyground performed with Zimbabwean musician Oliver Mtukudzi.

The band went on to perform alongside local legend Miriam Makeba, as well as Stanley Clarke and Femi Kuti, at the North Sea Jazz Festival, held during April in Cape Town. July also marked a break from the recording studio for the band, who had been working hard on their then unreleased album Nomvula. The band took this time to perform at the Villa Celimontana Festival in Rome, Italy.

Finally, in late 2004, Freshlyground released the album. The album initially only saw moderate success locally but ultimately went on to achieve double platinum status in South Africa. Its initial success was largely due to the catchy, feel-good lyrics of "Doo Be Doo", which enjoyed significant play on local radio. It was also covered in Indonesian by singer Gita Gutawa. Follow-up hits included "I'd Like" and the signature track "Nomvula", the former achieving unprecedented success on radio charts such as the 5FM Top 40, where it remained at No. 1 for several weeks.

=== Ma'Cheri (2007) ===
The album Ma'Cheri was released on 3 September 2007. The album was again produced by JB Arthur and Victor Masondo, was engineered by David Langemann and was recorded in Cape Town. The first single, "Pot Belly", was followed "Fired Up" and "Desire".

=== Radio Africa (2010) ===
Freshlyground's album Radio Africa was released in May 2010. Promotion for the album included a release of a collaborative music video with the team behind ZANEWS, a South African satirical puppet news show, for a song about Robert Mugabe titled "Chicken to Change". The release of the satirical song and video resulted in the group being banned from Zimbabwe for eight years. In 2018, due to a change in the presidency, the band was no longer prohibited from entering the country and they were finally able to return to Zimbabwe to perform.

=== Cape Town Stadium Soccer Festival ===
On 23 January 2010, Freshlyground performed at the official inauguration game at the new Cape Town Stadium, where local Cape Town football clubs Ajax Cape Town and Santos played each other in a match decided on penalties.

=== 2010 FIFA World Cup ===
A song by Colombian pop star Shakira and Freshlyground was the official song of the 2010 FIFA World Cup. The song, titled "Waka Waka (This Time for Africa)", is based on "Zangalewa", a popular Makossa African soldiers' song by Golden Sounds. "Zangalewa" was a hit single in Colombia in 1987. Shakira and Freshlyground performed the song at the pre-tournament kick-off concert in Soweto on 10 June.

The following July, the band also took part in the official handing-over ceremony, which took place in South Africa.

=== The Legend (2013) ===
Violinist Kyla-Rose Smith stated on the band's web site that "This album captures the emotion, the passion and the energy of our live performances. Our live concerts have always been at the bedrock of our popularity."

== Artistry ==
The band's sound is primarily afro-fusion, a musical style that emerged in South Africa during the 1970s and 1980s that is a mix of dance and music-genre styles. The band's songs are multilingual and incorporate languages such as Xhosa, English, French and Zulu. Their music is frequently a fusion of genres incorporating an experimental wide range of crossovers including kwaito, folk, kwela, indie-rock, jazz and blues.

== Honours ==
In 2005, Freshlyground was nominated for three South African Music Awards for their 2004 album Nomvula. Although they won no SAMAs that year, in 2008 the Recording Industry of South Africa awarded them the coveted Best Duo or Group SAMA. In the same year, their 2007 album Ma' Cheri won the prestigious Album of the Year SAMA, as well as Best Adult Contemporary Album: English, and Best Engineer.

At the 2006 MTV Europe Music Awards in Copenhagen, Denmark, Freshlyground became the first South African musical act to receive honours from MTV, when they received the MTV Europe Music Award for Best African Act.

At the 2008 Channel O Music Video Awards the band received the "Best Africa, Southern" accolade for their single "Pot Belly". In 2008 the band was awarded the South African Music Awards for their album "Macheri."

== Band members ==
- Zolani Mahola (2002–2019) – lead vocals
- Simon Attwell (2002–2019) – flute, saxophone, keyboard and band management
- Peter Cohen (2002–2019) – drums
- Julio "Gugs" Sigauque (2002–2019) – lead guitar (steel-string acoustic guitar)
- Chris "Bakkies" Bakalanga (2016–2019) – lead guitar
- Kyla-Rose Smith (2003–2016) – violin and backing vocals
- Josh Hawks (2002–2019) – bass and backing vocals
- Shaggy Scheepers (2008–2019) – percussion
- Aron Turest-Swartz (2002–2009) – keyboard

== Discography ==
=== Albums ===
- Jika Jika (2003)
- Nomvula (2004) - #ITA 96
- Ma' Cheri (2007)
- Radio Africa (2010)
- Take Me to the Dance (2012)
- The Legend (2013)

=== As featured artists ===
- "Waka Waka (This Time for Africa)" (2010 FIFA World Cup single by Shakira)
