= List of songs recorded by Shakira =

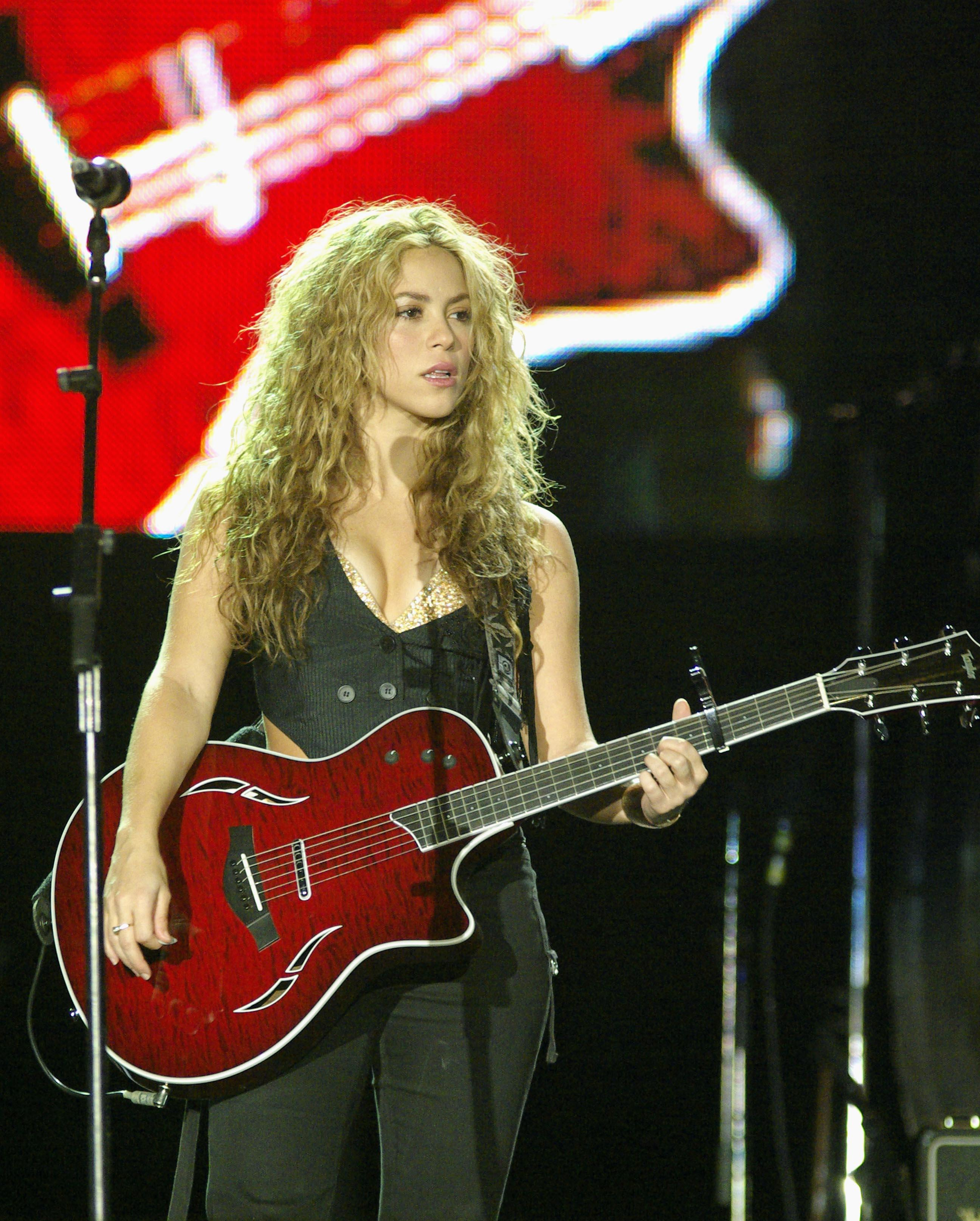
Shakira performing "Don't Bother" at Rock in Rio in 2008

Shakira is a Colombian singer who has recorded songs for twelve studio albums, three compilation albums, two live albums and two promotional albums. She has released 68 singles, two extended plays, 35 music videos and three music DVDs. She released two albums Magia (1991) and Peligro (1993), before releasing a third album Pies Descalzos in 1995. It debuted at No. 1 in eight countries and went on to sell five million copies worldwide. The album spawned six singles, "Estoy Aquí", "¿Dónde Estás Corazón?", "Pies Descalzos, Sueños Blancos", "Un Poco de Amor", "Antología" and "Se Quiere, Se Mata". In 1996, a remix album, titled The Remixes was released with remixes of songs from her debut album. Shakira's fourth studio album Dónde Están los Ladrones? was released in September 1998. The album debuted at No. 131 on the Billboard 200 and sold 7 million copies worldwide. Eight of the 11 tracks on the album's became singles: "Ciega, Sordomuda", "Si Te Vas", "Tú", "Inevitable", "Octavo Día", "Moscas en la Casa", "No Creo" and "Ojos Así".

Shakira's first live album, MTV Unplugged, was released in February 2000, and reached number one on the US Top Latin Albums chart. In 2001, she released her fifth studio album and the first to include songs in English, Laundry Service. The album was the best-selling album of 2002; selling more than 15 million copies worldwide Seven songs from the album became international singles: "Whenever, Wherever", "Underneath Your Clothes", "Objection (Tango)", "The One", "Poem to a Horse", "Te Dejo Madrid" and "Que Me Quedes Tú". Her second compilation album, Grandes Éxitos was released in November 2002 topping the U.S. Hot Latin Tracks chart. Shakira released her second live album, Live & off the Record, in March 2004. She covered the AC/DC song "Back in Black".

Her sixth studio album and third to be in fully Spanish, Fijación Oral Vol. 1, was released in June 2005. It has sold 4 million copies worldwide, debuted at No. 4 on the Billboard 200, and was certified 11× Disco de Platino, becoming one of the best-selling Spanish-language albums in the United States. Five singles were released from the album: "La Tortura", "No", "Día De Enero", "La Pared" and "Las de la Intuición". Her seventh album and the first to be recorded fully in English, Oral Fixation Vol. 2, was released in November 2005. The album has sold more than eight million copies worldwide. Three singles were released from the album: "Don't Bother", "Hips Don't Lie", and "Illegal". A box set of the two volumes of Oral Fixation was released in December 2006, under the name Oral Fixation Volumes 1&2.

Shakira released her third English studio album, and eighth overall, She Wolf, in October 2009. Four singles were released from the album: "She Wolf", "Did It Again", "Give It Up to Me", and "Gypsy". "She Wolf" has sold around 2 million copies worldwide. Her fourth Spanish and ninth overall studio album Sale el Sol was released in October 2010. Five singles were released from the album: "Loca", "Sale el Sol", "Rabiosa", "Antes De Las Seis", and "Addicted To You". The album has sold over 4,000,000 copies worldwide.

Shakira has sold more than 70 million albums worldwide and 70 million singles.

== Released songs ==
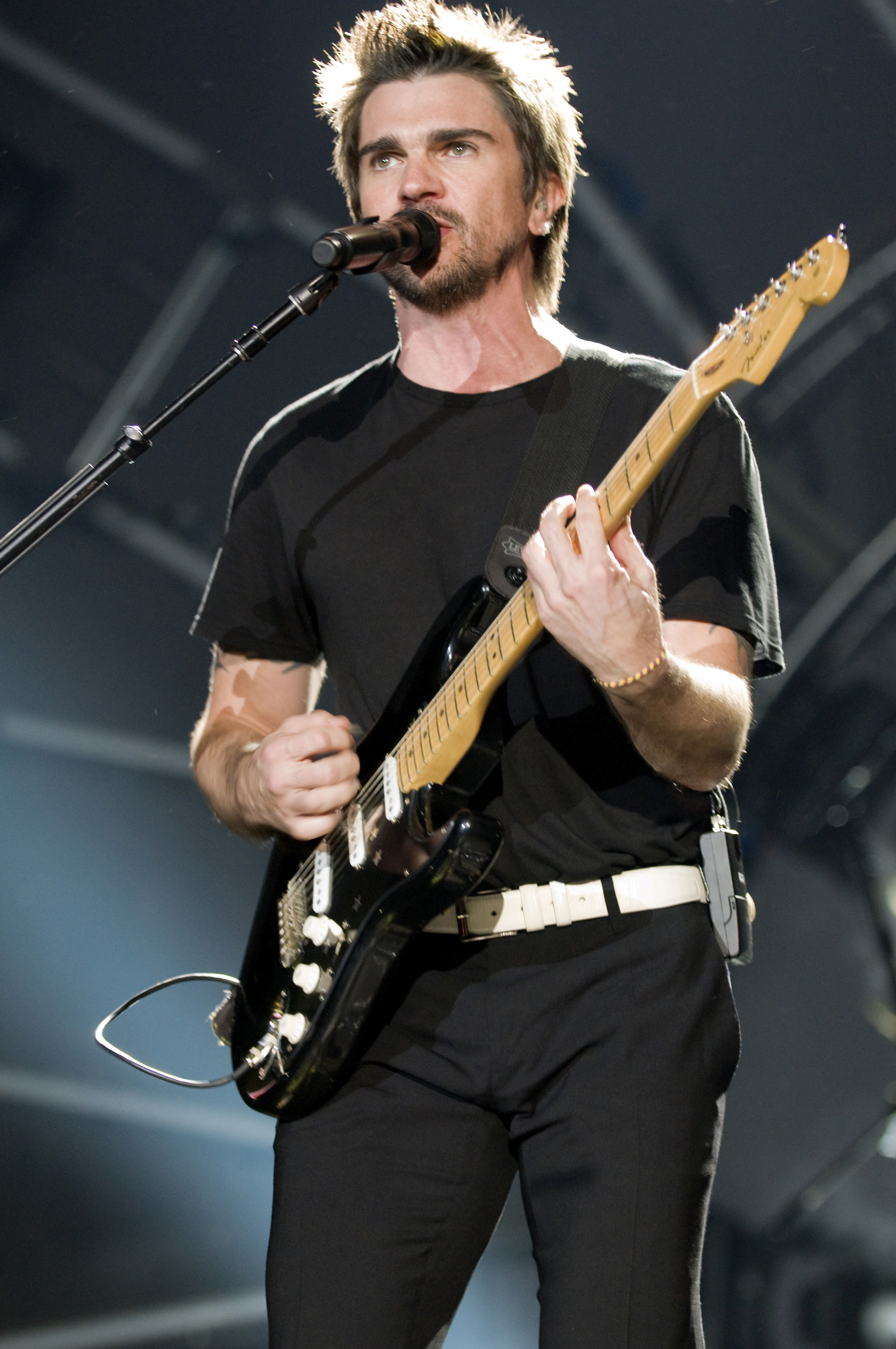
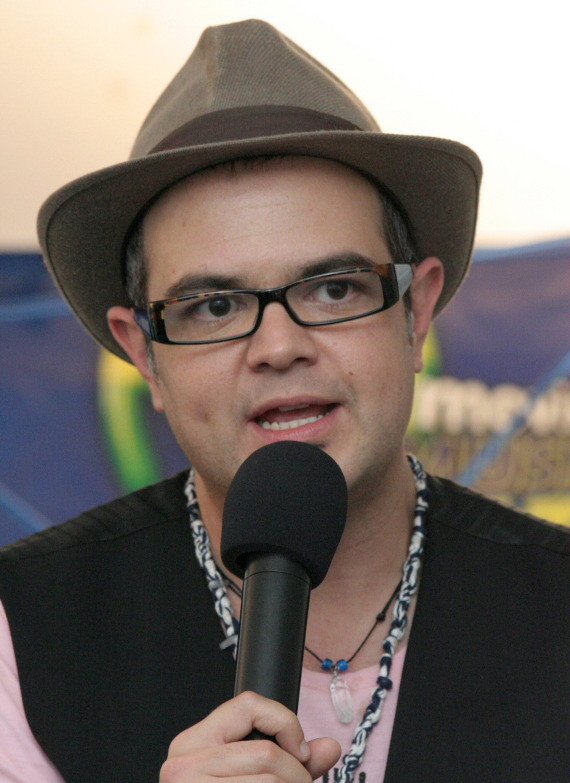
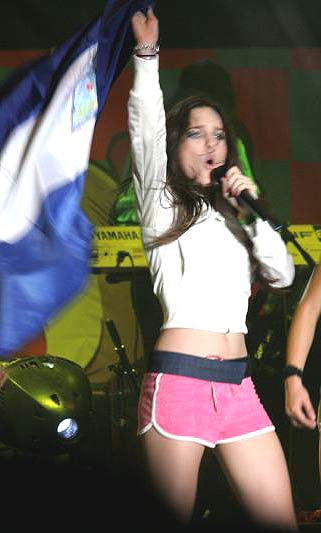
After the earthquake that hit Haiti in 2010, Carlos Jean wrote "Ay Haiti" in initiative to benefit earthquake victims during this song uses the voices of various artists such as Juanes (left), Aleks Syntek (center) and Belinda (right).

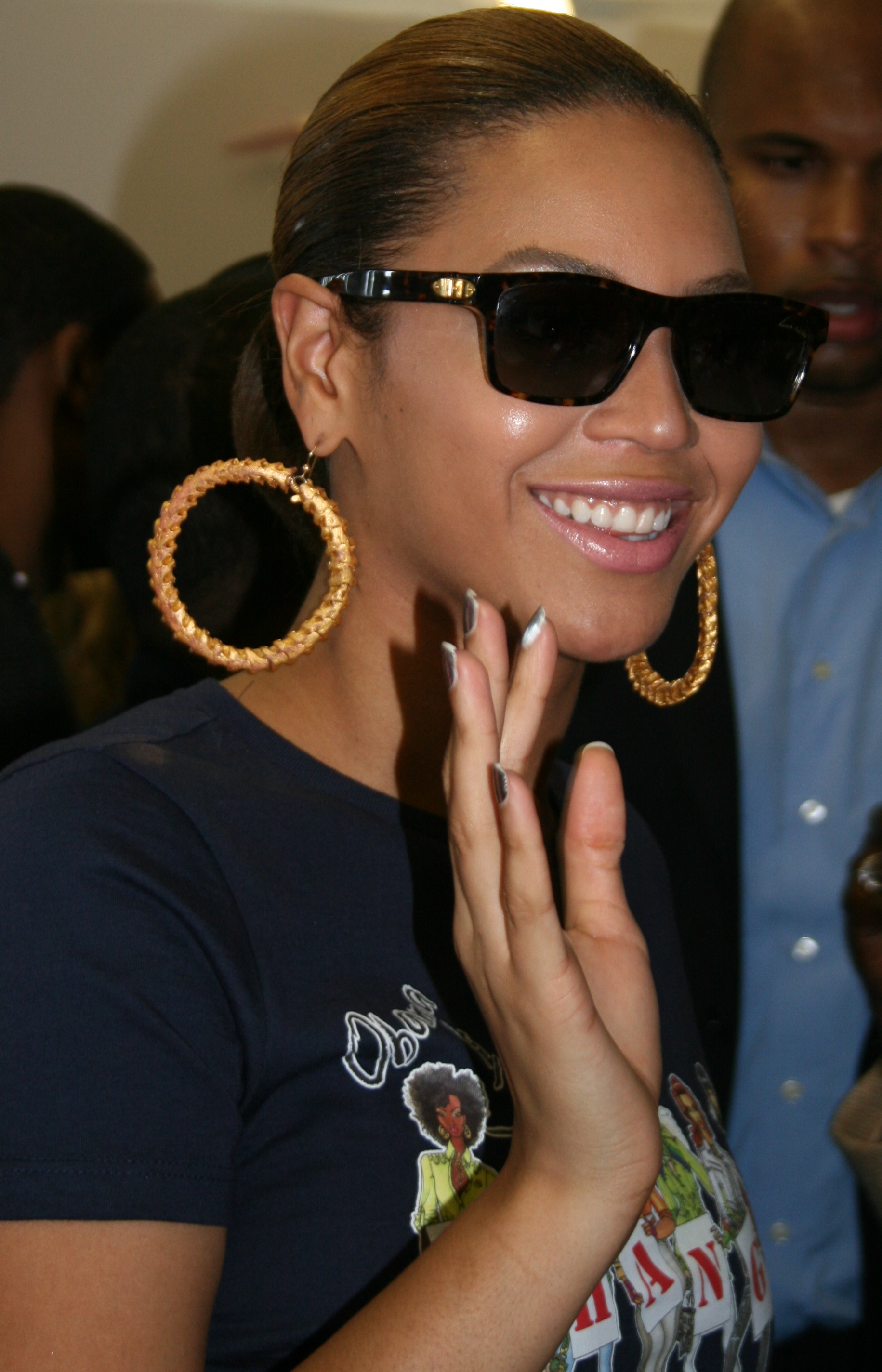
Beyoncé (pictured) and Shakira recorded their respective parts in separate studios in 2007, they just met to record the music video.

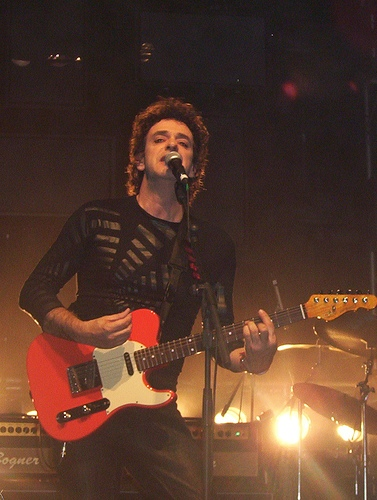
Gustavo Cerati (pictured) is one of the collaborators and writer on songs like "Devoción", "Día Especial" "No" and "Tu Boca".

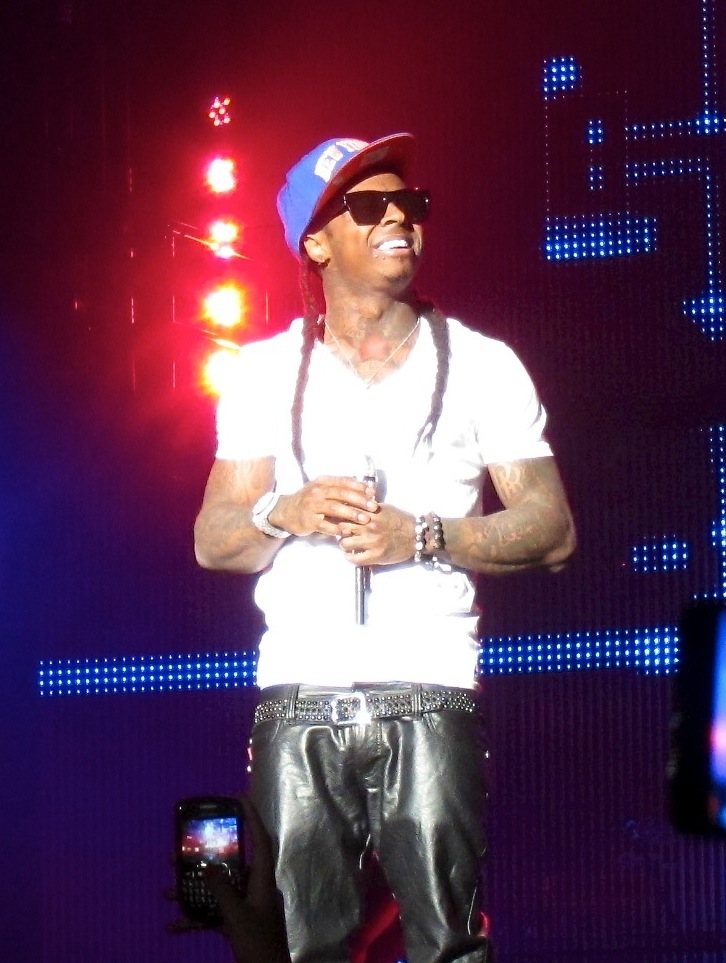
Lil Wayne (pictured) is the guest artist and writer of "Give It Up To Me".

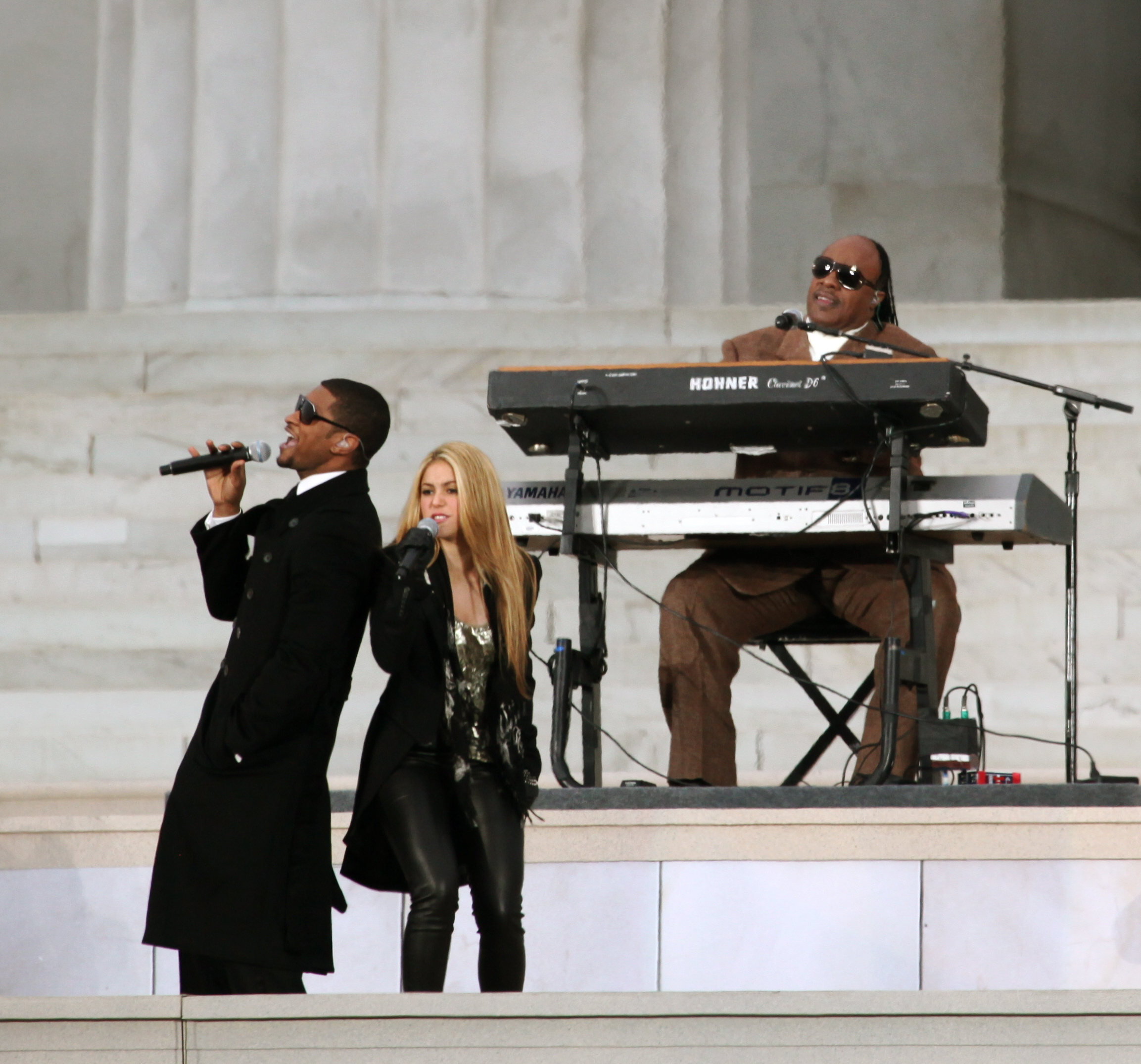
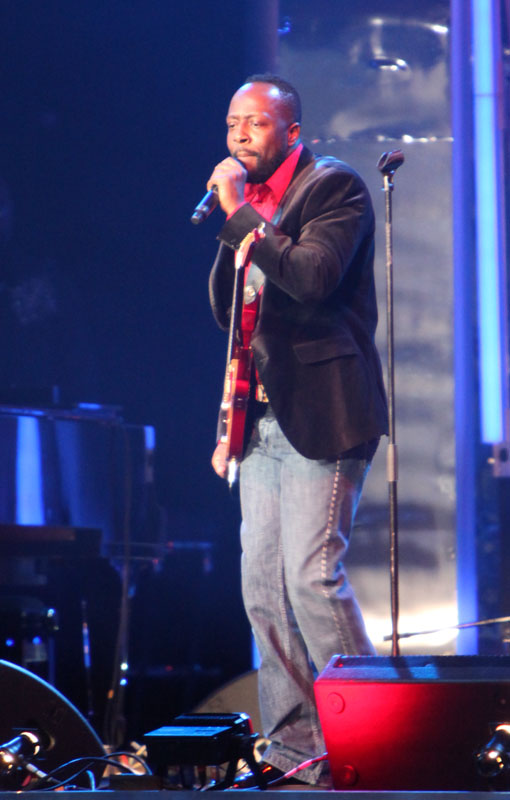
Shakira performing with Stevie Wonder and Usher "Higher Ground" during Obama's inauguration in 2009 ( left), Wyclef Jean (right) was the main writer and contributor to the song "Hips Don't Lie" in 2006 to launch the re-edition of Oral Fixation Vol. 2 and later in the Jean song "King and Queen".

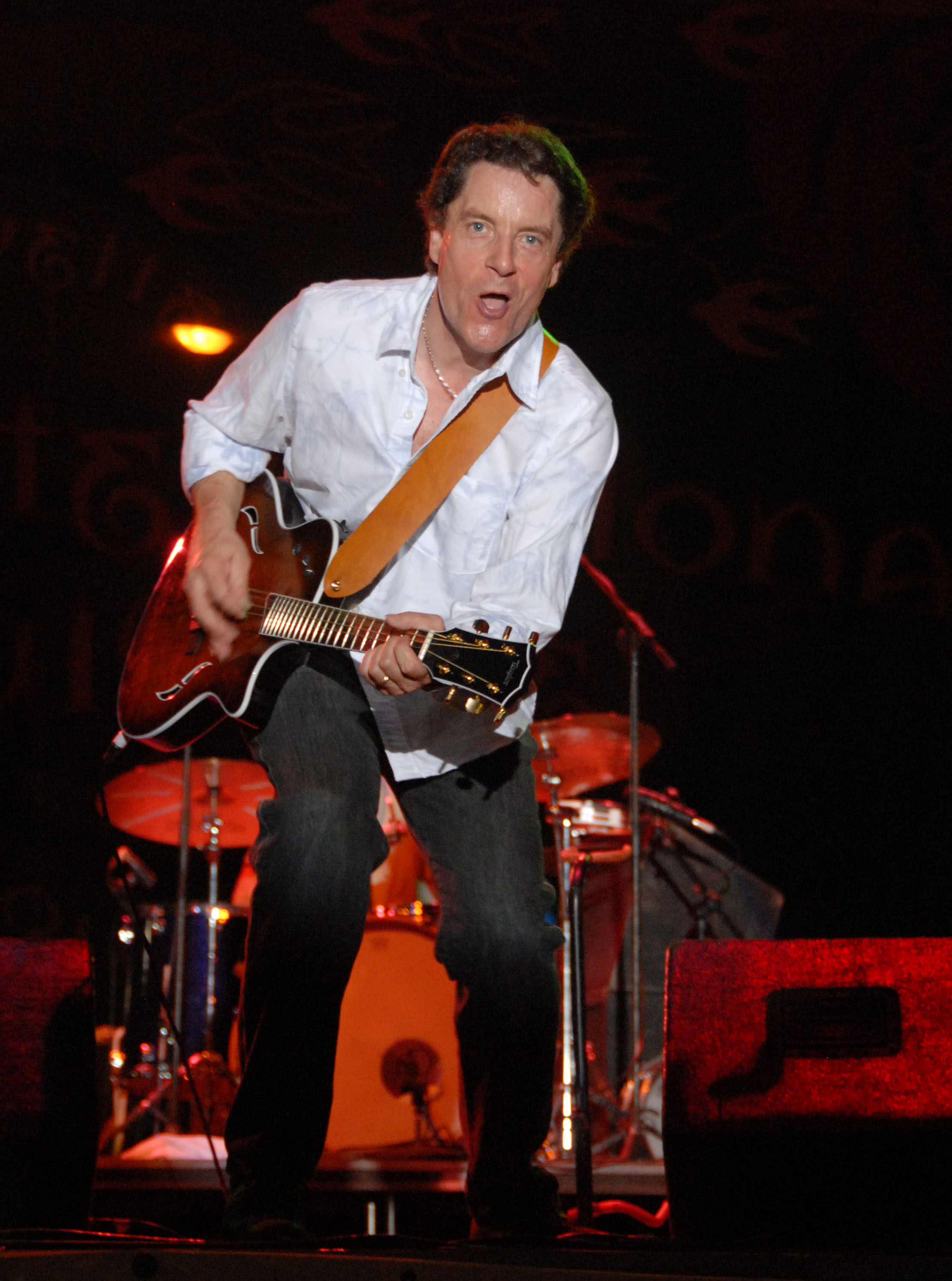
Francis Cabrel (pictured) is the writer of her song "Je l'aime à mourir", in 2011 Shakira covered the song a release as single from her live album Shakira: Live from Paris.

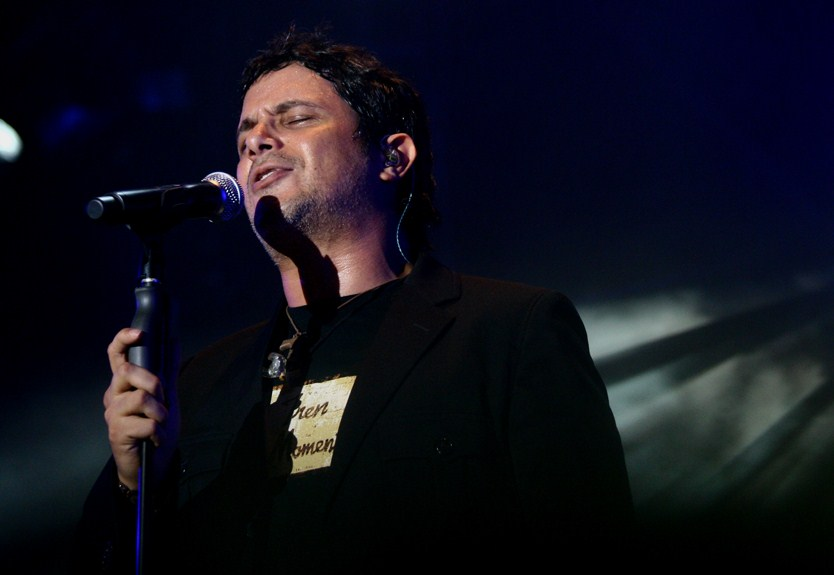
Alejandro Sanz is the featured artist in "La Tortura" released in 2005, after Shakira and Sanz recorded "Te Lo Agradezco, Pero No" launched in 2007.

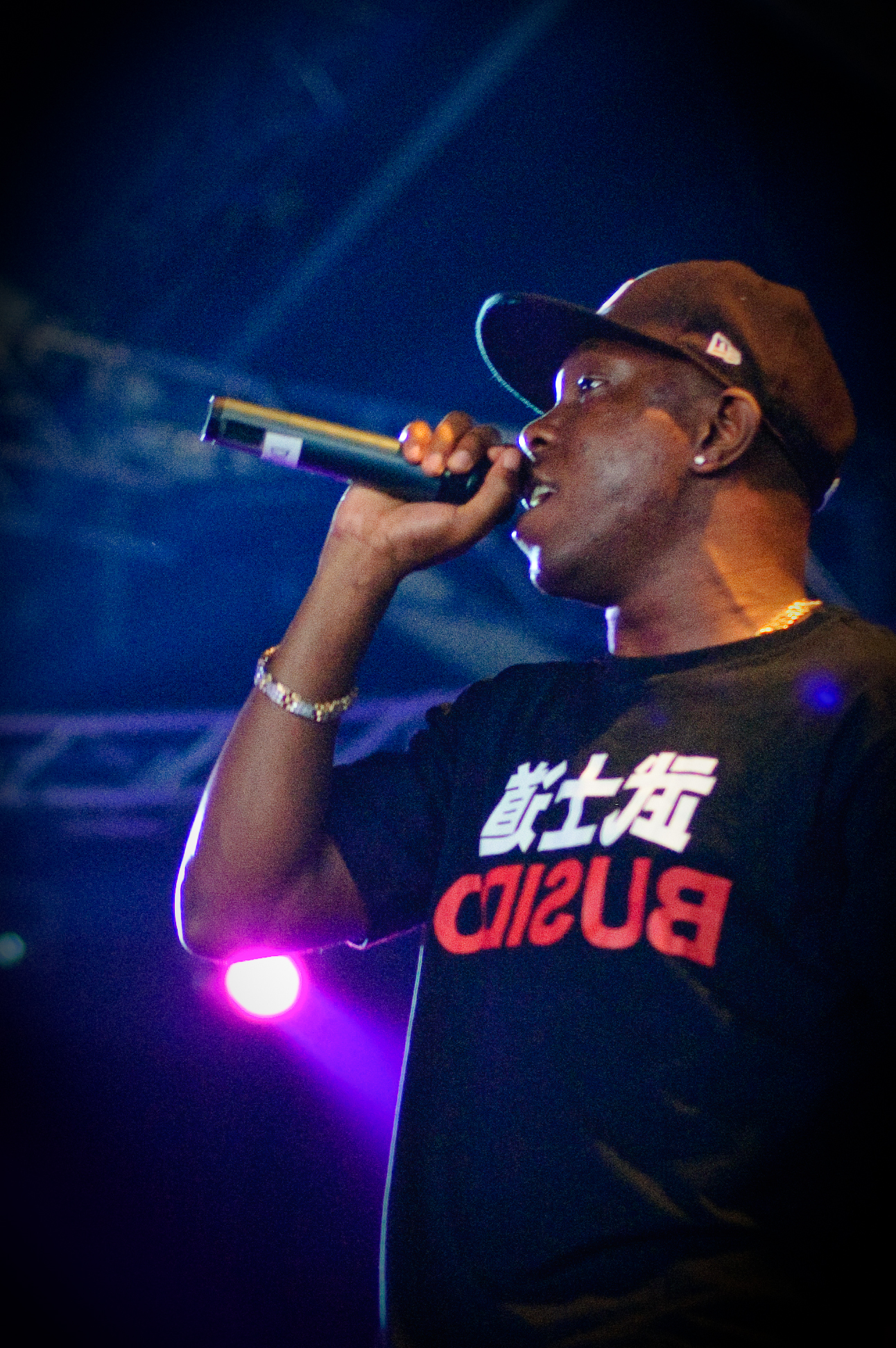
"Loca" contains versions in English and Spanish, the English version includes the collaboration of Dizzee Rascal, while the Spanish version contains the collaboration of El Cata.

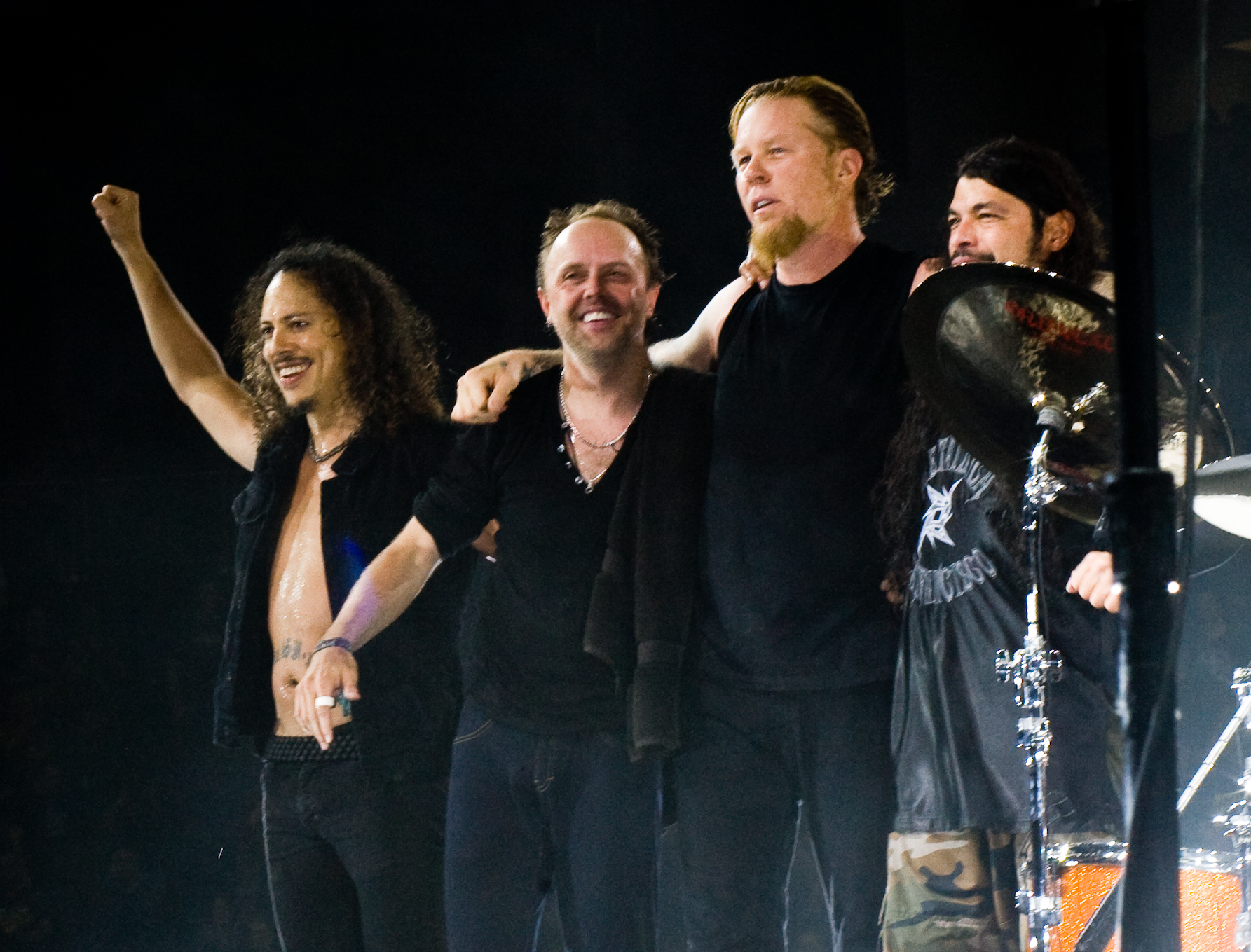
Metallica are the songwriters of "Nothing Else Matters", during The Sun Comes Out World Tour Shakira mixed the song with her song "Despedida" and later release during the 2011 live album Live from Paris.

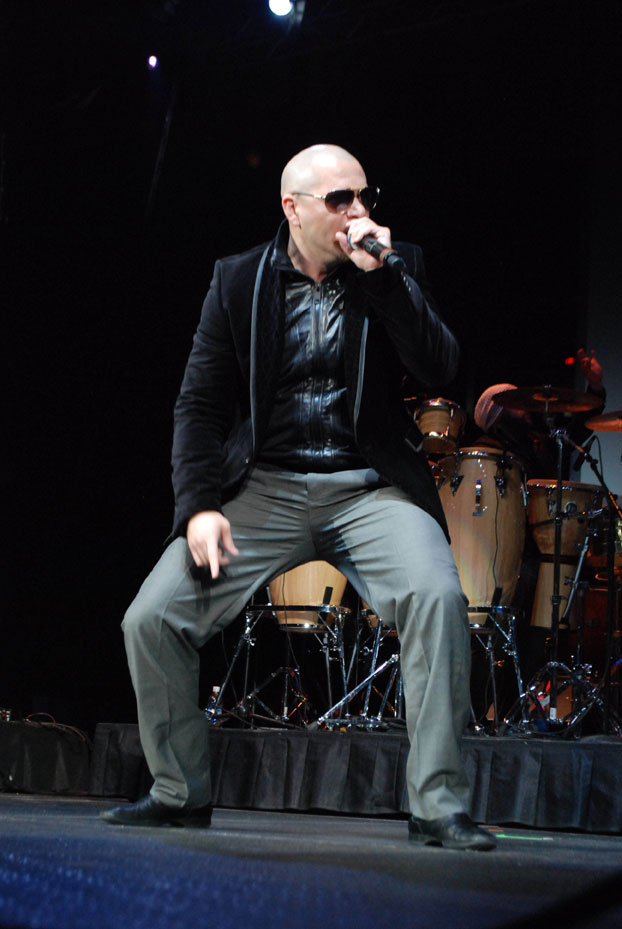
"Rabiosa" contains versions in English and Spanish, the English version includes the collaboration of Pitbull, while the Spanish version contains the collaboration of El Cata.

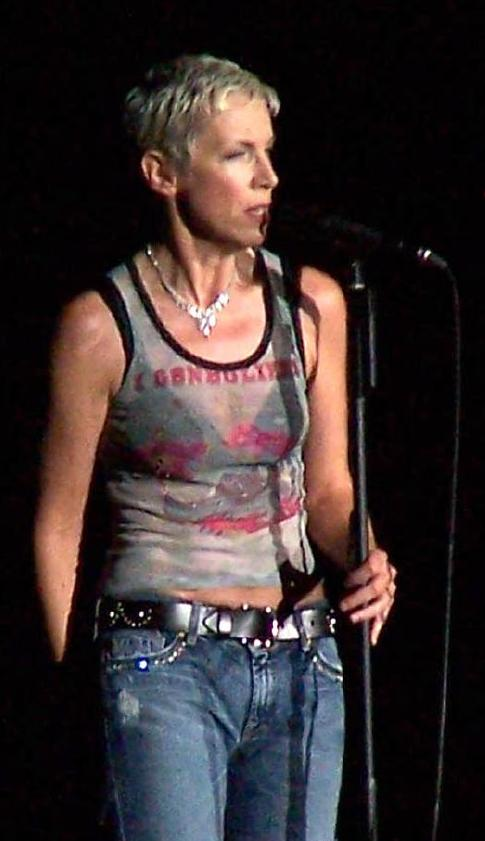
"Sing" by Annie Lennox is a collaboration between Lennox and twenty-three prominent female acts and artists, The line-up consists of Madonna, Anastacia, Isobel Campbell, Dido, Céline Dion, Melissa Etheridge, Fergie, Beth Gibbons, Faith Hill, Angélique Kidjo, Beverley Knight, Gladys Knight, k.d. lang, Sarah McLachlan, Beth Orton, P!nk, Bonnie Raitt, Shakira, Shingai Shoniwa, Joss Stone, Sugababes, KT Tunstall, and Martha Wainwright.

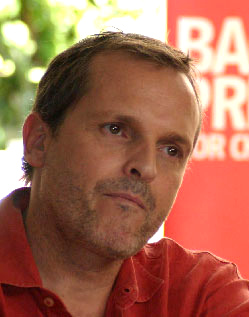
Miguel Bosé re-recorded his song "Si Tú No Vuelves" with Shakira in 2007 to launch the same year on his album Papito.

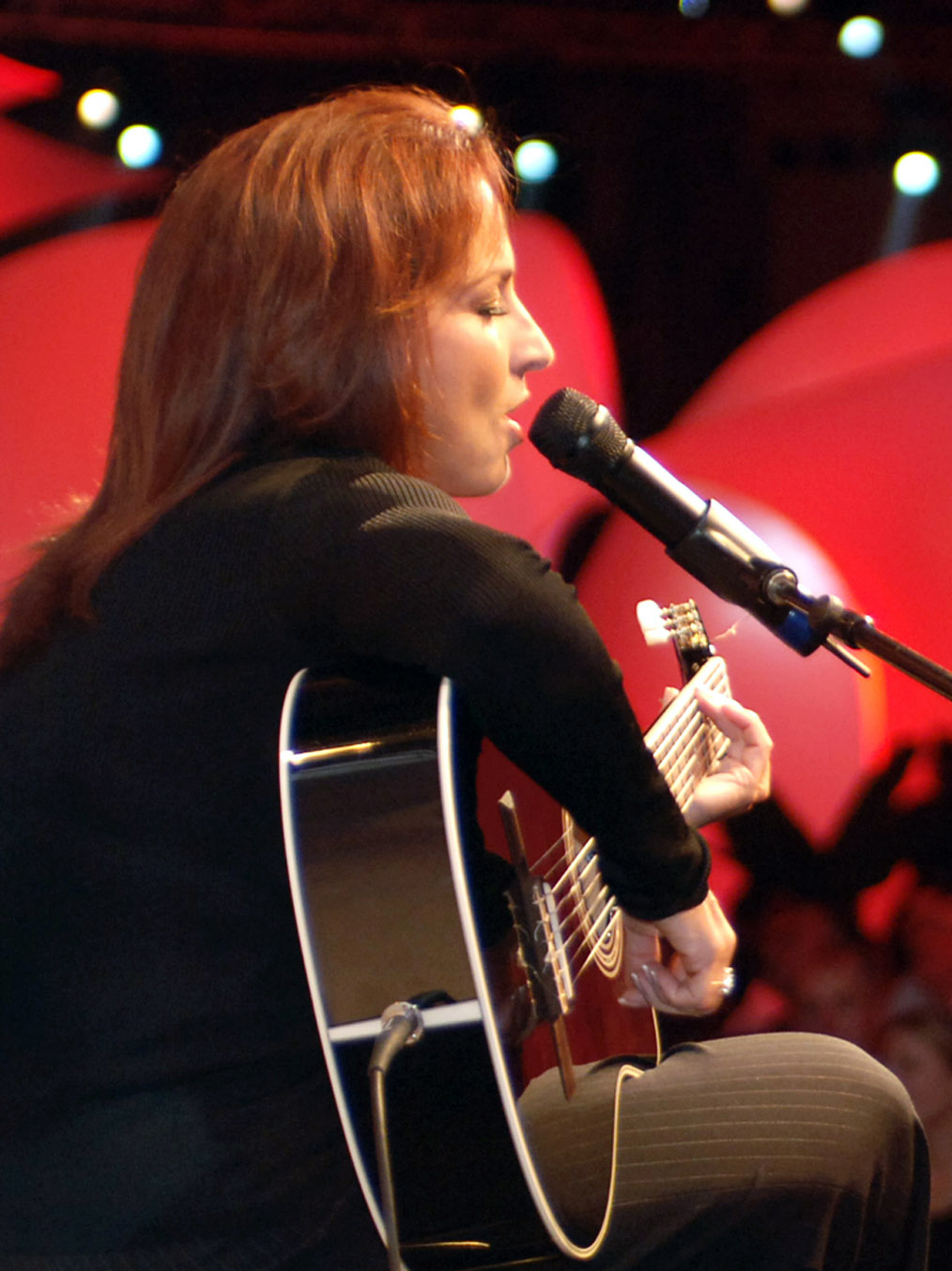
Gloria Estefan is one of the writers of "Whenever, Wherever" and the English version of "Ojos Asi".

Key
†	Indicates single release
‡	Indicates promotional single release

Title song	Album	Writer	Year	Ref.
"1968"	Peligro	Shakira, Eduardo Paz	1993	
"23"	Shakira	Shakira, Luis Fernando Ochoa	2014	
"Acróstico"	Las Mujeres Ya No Lloran	Keityn, Shakira, Luis Fernando Ochoa, Lexus	2023	
"Addicted to You" †	Sale el Sol	Shakira, El Cata, Luis Fernando Ochoa, John Hill	2010	
"Agua" (with Maluma)			2026	
"Algo Tú" (with Beéle)	–	Shakira, Keityn, Beéle, Súper Dakis, Flambo, Alexander "A.C." Castillo.	2026	
"Always on My Mind"	VH1 Divas Las Vegas	Johnny Christopher, Mark James, Wayne Carson Thompson	2002	
"Amarillo"	El Dorado	Shakira, Luis Fernando Ochoa	2017	
"Amor (Celos de ti)"	Al Compás de un Sentimiento	Pedro Flores	1996	
"Animal City"	Oral Fixation Vol. 2	Shakira, Luis Fernando Ochoa	2005	
"Antes de las Seis" †	Sale el Sol	Shakira, Lester Méndez	2010	
"Antología"	Pies Descalzos	Shakira, Luis Fernando Ochoa	1995	
"Años Luz"	She Wolf	Shakira, Jorge Drexler, Pharrell Williams	2009	
"Ask for More"	—N/a	Shakira	2003	
"Ay Haiti" (with Artist for Haiti)	—N/a	Carlos Jean, Dnovae	2010	
"Back in Black" (Live)	Live & off the Record	Angus Young, Malcolm Young, Brian Johnson	2004	
"Beautiful Liar" †	B'Day (deluxe edition); Irreemplazable	Mikkel S. Eriksen, Tor Erik Hermansen, Amanda Ghost, Ian Dench, Beyoncé Knowles	2007	
"Bésame" (with Alejandro Sanz)	¿Y Ahora Qué?	Shakira, Alejandro Sanz, Andy Clay, Kemzo, Rayito, Héctor Rubén Rivera "Kahno", Alexander "A.C." Castillo	2025	
"Blanca Mujer" (Draco Rosa featuring Shakira)	Vida	Draco Rosa	2013	
"Boig per Tu"	Shakira (Spanish/Latin American deluxe edition)	Josep Bellavista, Carlos Hernandez, Juan Clapera, Alberto Herrera	2014	
"Broken Record"	Shakira	Shakira, Busbee	2014	
"Brujería"	Peligro	Eduardo Paz	1993	
"Can't Remember to Forget You" (feat. Rihanna) †	Shakira	Shakira, John Hill, Tom Hull, Daniel Alexander, Erik Hassle, Robyn Fenty	2014	
"Cazador de Amor"	Magia	Shakira	1991	
"Chantaje" (with Maluma)	El Dorado	Shakira, Maluma, Kenai, The RudeBoyz	2016	
"Chasing Shadows"	Shakira (Deluxe edition)	Sia Furler, Fernando Garibay, Greg Kurstin	2014	
"Choka Choka" (with Anitta)	Equilibrium	Kevyn Mauricio Cruz, Larissa de Macedo Machado, Shakira Mebarak	2026	
"Ciega, Sordomuda" †	Dónde Están los Ladrones?	Shakira, Estéfano Salgado	1998	
"Clandestino" (with Maluma)	El Dorado (vinyl edition)	Shakira, Juan Luis Londoño, Edgar Barrera	2018	
"Coconut Tree"	El Dorado	Shakira, Luis Fernando Ochoa	2017	
"Cohete" (with Rauw Alejandro)	Las Mujeres Ya No Lloran	Shakira, David A. Sprecher (Yeti Beats), Mario Cáceres, Vicente Jiménez	2024	
"Comme moi" (with Black M)	El Dorado	Diallo, Shakira, Nasti, Dadju, Dany Synthé	2017	
"Cómo Dónde y Cuándo"	Las Mujeres Ya No Lloran	Alberto Meléndez, Shakira, Servando Primera, Rafa Rodríguez, Daniel Rondón	2024	
"Controlas Mi Destino"	Peligro	Shakira	1993	
"Copa Vacía" (with Manuel Turizo)	Las Mujeres Ya No Lloran	Shakira, Gale, DallasK, Daniela Blau, Juan Diego Medina Vélez, Julián Turizo Zapata, Manuel Turizo, Slow	2023	
"Costumes Makes the Clown"	Oral Fixation Vol. 2	Shakira, Brendan Buckley	2005	
"Cuentas Conmigo"	Magia	Juanita Loboguerrero, Miguel Enrique Cubillos	1991	
"Cut Me Deep" (feat. Magic!	Shakira	Shakira, Nasri Atweh, Mark Pellizzer, Alex Tanas, Ben Spivak, Adam Messinger	2014	
"Dai Dai" (feat. Burna Boy)		Shakira, Burna Boy, Benny Adam, Jon Bellion, Ed Sheeran, Alexander Castillo	2026	
Dançando" (Ivete Sangalo featuring Shakira)	Real Fantasia	Dan Kambaiah, Davi Salles, Shakira, Joel Antonio, López Castro	2012	
"Dare (La La La)" †	Shakira	Shakira, Lukasz Gottwald, Mathieu Jomphe-Lepine, Max Martin, Henry Walter (Cirkut), Raelene Arreguin, John J. Conte Jr.	2014	
"Deja Vu" (with Prince Royce)	El Dorado	Geoffrey Rojas, Shakira, Daniel Santacruz, Manny Cruz	2017	
"Despedida"	Love in the Time of Cholera	Shakira, Pedro Aznar	2008	
"Devoción"	Sale el Sol	Shakira, Jorge Drexler, John Hill, Sam Endicott, Gustavo Cerati	2010	
"Dia de Enero" †	Fijación Oral Vol. 1	Shakira, Lester Méndez	2005	
"Día Especial" (featuring Gustavo Cerati)	Fijación Oral Vol. 1	Shakira, Gustavo Cerati	2005	
"Did It Again"	She Wolf	Shakira, Pharrell Williams	2009	
"Did It Again" (remix) (featuring Kid Cudi)	She Wolf (U.S. deluxe edition)	Shakira, Pharrell Williams, Kid Cudi	2009	
"Don't Bother" †	Oral Fixation Vol. 2	Shakira, Scott Spock, Lauren Christy, Graham Edwards, Heather Reid, Leisha Hailey	2005	
"Don't Wait Up"	—N/a	Shakira, Emily Warren, Ian Kirkpatrick	2021	
"Don't You Worry" (with Black Eyed Peas)	Elevation	Allan Pineda, David Guetta, Jimmy Gomez, Johnny Goldstein, Mikkel Cox, Shakira, Tobias Frederiksen, William Adams	2022	
"Dónde Están los Ladrones?"	Dónde Están los Ladrones?	Shakira, Luis Fernando Ochoa	1998	
"Dónde Estás Corazón?"	Pies Descalzos	Shakira, Luis Fernando Ochoa	1995	
"Dreams for Plans"	Oral Fixation Vol. 2	Shakira, Brendan Buckley	2005	
"El Jefe" (with Fuerza Regida)	Las Mujeres Ya No Lloran	Shakira, Edgar Barrera, Kevyn Mauricio Cruz, Manuel Lorente Freiré	2023	
"El Último Adiós (The Last Goodbye)" (with various artists)	—N/a	Gian Marco, Emílio Estefan Jr.	2001	
"Empire" †	Shakira	Steve Mac, Ina Wroldsen	2014	
"En Tus Pupilas"	Fijación Oral Vol. 1	Shakira, Luis Fernando Ochoa	2005	
"(Entre Paréntesis)" (with Grupo Frontera)	Las Mujeres Ya No Lloran	Shakira, Kevyn Cruz, Edgar Barrera, Yohanes Manuel, Lenin Palacios	2024	
"Eres"	Peligro	Shakira	1993	
"Escondite Inglés"	Fijación Oral Vol. 1	Shakira	2005	
"Esta Noche Voy Contigo"	Magia	Miguel Enrique Cubillos	1991	
"Este Amor Es Lo Más Bello del Mundo"	Peligro	Eduardo Paz	1993	
"Estou Aqui"	Pies Descalzos (Brazilian edition)	Shakira, Luis Fernando Ochoa	1996	
"Estoy Aquí"	Pies Descalzos	Shakira, Luis Fernando Ochoa	1995	
"Eterno Amor"	Peligro	Eddie Sierra	1993	
"Eurosummer (Girls Trip)" (with Zara Larsson)	Midnight Sun: Girls Trip	Zara Larsson, Shakira, MNEK, Helena Gao, Zhone, Mary Weitz, Margo XS, Theron Thomas, Scott Bruzenak	2026	
"Eyes Like Yours (Ojos Así)"	Laundry Service	Shakira, Gloria Estefan, Pablo Florez, Javier Garza	2001	
"Fool"	Laundry Service	Shakira, Brendan Buckley	2001	
"Gafas Oscuras"	Magia	Shakira	1991	
"Girl Like Me" (with Black Eyed Peas)	Translation	William Adams, Allan Pineda, Jimmy Luis Gomez, Shakira Mebarak (Shakira), Brendan Buckley, Johnny Goldstein, Albert Menendez, Tim Mitchell	2020	
"Gitana"	She Wolf (Spanish/Latin American deluxe edition)	Shakira, Amanda Ghost, Ian Dench, Carl Sturken, Evan Rogers, Jorge Drexler	2009	
"Give It Up to Me" (featuring Lil Wayne)	She Wolf (North American deluxe edition)	Timothy Mosley (Timbaland), Shakira, Dwayne Carter (Lil Wayne), Amanda Ghost	2009	
"Good Stuff"	She Wolf	Shakira, Pharrell Williams	2009	
"Gordita" (featuring Residente Calle 13)	Sale el Sol	Shakira, Calle 13	2010	
"Gracias a la Vida" (with Juanes, Alejandro Sanz, Laura Pausini, Miguel Bosé, Beto Cuevas and Michael Bublé)	—N/a	Violeta Parra	2010	
"Gypsy"	She Wolf	Amanda Ghost, Shakira, Ian Dench, Carl Sturken, Evan Rogers	2009	
"Hay Amores"	Love in The Time of Cholera	Shakira, Pedro Aznar	2007	
"Hey You"	Oral Fixation Vol. 2	Shakira, Tim Mitchell	2005	
"Hips Don't Lie" (featuring Wyclef Jean)	Oral Fixation Vol. 2 (Reloaded edition)	Wyclef Jean, Shakira, Oscar Arfanno, LaTravia Parker	2006	
"How Do You Do"	Oral Fixation Vol. 2	Shakira, Lauren Christy, Scott Spock, Graham Edwards	2005	
"I'll Stand by You" (featuring The Roots)	Hope for Haiti Now	Chrissie Hynde, Tom Kelly, Billy Steinberg	2010	
"Illegal" (featuring Carlos Santana)	Oral Fixation Vol. 2	Shakira, Lester Mendez	2005	
"Aatini Al Nay" (Intro)	Oral Fixation Tour	Fairuz, Rahbani Brothers	2007	
"Inevitable"	Dónde Están los Ladrones?	Shakira, Luis Fernando Ochoa	1998	
"Islands"	Sale el Sol	The xx	2010	
"Je L'Aime à Mourir"	Shakira: Live from Paris	Francis Cabrel	2011	
"King and Queen" (Wyclef Jean featuring Shakira)	Carnival Vol. II: Memoirs of an Immigrant	Wyclef Jean, Shakira	2007	
"Knock on My Door"	—N/a	Luis Fernando Ochoa, Shakira	2003	
"La Bicicleta" (with Carlos Vives)	El Dorado	Shakira, Carlos Vives, Andrés Castro	2016	
"La Fuerte" (with Bizarrap)	Las Mujeres Ya No Lloran	Thomas Bangalter, Edwin Birdsong, Shakira, Guy-Manuel de Homem-Christo, Kevyn Cruz, Alberto Meléndez, Leonardo Zapata	2024	
"La La La (Brasil 2014)" (featuring Carlinhos Brown †	Shakira (International physical deluxe edition)	Shakira, Lukasz Gottwald, Mathieu Jomphe-Lepine, Max Martin, Henry Walter, Raelene Arreguin, John J. Conte Jr.	2014	
"La La La (Brasil 2014) (Spanish Version)" (featuring Carlinhos Brown †	Shakira (Spanish/Latin American deluxe edition)	Shakira, Lukasz Gottwald, Mathieu Jomphe-Lepine, Max Martin, Henry Walter, Raelene Arreguin, John J. Conte Jr.	2014	
"La La La" †	Shakira	Shakira, Lukasz Gottwald, Mathieu Jomphe-Lepine, Max Martin, Henry Walter, Raelene Arreguin, John J. Conte Jr.	2014	
"La Maza" (Mercedes Sosa featuring Shakira)	Cantora 1	Popi Spatocco	2009	
"La Pared"	Fijación Oral Vol. 1	Shakira, Lester Mendez	2005	
"La Tortura" (featuring Alejandro Sanz)	Fijación Oral Vol. 1	Shakira, Luis Fernando Ochoa	2005	
"Las de la Intuición"	Fijación Oral Vol. 1	Shakira, Luis Fernando Ochoa	2005	
"Lejos de tu Amor"	Magia	Pablo Tedeschi	1991	
"Lo Hecho Está Hecho"	She Wolf	Shakira, Jorge Drexler, Pharrell Williams	2009	
"Lo Hecho Está Hecho" (featuring Pitbull)	She Wolf (Spanish/Latin American deluxe edition)	Shakira, Jorge Drexler, Pharrell Williams, Armando Peréz (Pitbull)	2009	
"Lo Imprescindible"	Fijación Oral Vol. 1	Shakira, Lester Mendez	2005	
"Lo Que Más"	Sale el Sol	Shakira, Albert Menéndez	2010	
"Loba"	She Wolf	Shakira, John Hill, Sam Endicott, Jorge Drexler	2009	
"Loca" (featuring Dizzee Rascal)	Sale el Sol	Shakira, El Cata, Dizzee Rascal, Armando Peréz (Pitbull)	2010	
"Loca" (featuring El Cata)	Sale el Sol	Shakira, El Cata, Armando Peréz	2010	
"Loca por Ti"	Shakira	Shakira, Josep Bellavista, Carlos Hernandez, Juan Clapera, Alberto Herrera	2014	
"Long Time"	She Wolf	Shakira, Pharrell Williams	2009	
"Magia"	Magia	Shakira	1991	
"Mariposas"	Sale el Sol	Shakira, Albert Menéndez	2010	
"Me Gusta"	—N/a	Carlos E. Ortiz Rivera, Daniel Echavarría Oviedo, Emmanuel Gazmey Santiago, Ian Lewis, Joan Antonio González Marrero, Shakira, Édgar Barrera	2020	
"Me Enamoré"	El Dorado	Shakira, Rayito	2017	
"Medicine" (feat. Blake Shelton) ‡	Shakira	Shakira, Hillary Lindsey, Mark Bright	2014	
"Men in This Town"	She Wolf	Shakira, John Hill, Sam Endicott	2009	
"Mi Verdad" (Maná featuring Shakira)	Cama Incendiada	Fher Olvera	2015	
"Mon Amour"	She Wolf	Shakira, Albert Menéndez	2009	
"Monotonía" (with Ozuna)	Las Mujeres Ya No Lloran	Shakira, Ozuna, Keityn, Albert Hype, Nup, Ciey, Primo	2022	
"Moscas en la Casa"	Dónde Están los Ladrones?	Shakira	1998	
"Nada"	El Dorado	Shakira, Luis Fernando Ochoa	2017	
"Nassau"	Las Mujeres Ya No Lloran	Shakira, Marcos Efraín Masís Fernández, Alberto Carlos Melendez, The Roommates, Aldae, Carolina Isabel Colón Juarbe, Daniela Blau, Kevyn Cruz, Taylor Monét Parks (Taylor Parx)	2024	
"Necesito de Ti"	Magia	Shakira	1991	
"No" (featuring Gustavo Cerati)	Fijación Oral Vol. 1	Shakira, Lester Mendez	2005	
"No Creo"	Dónde Están los Ladrones?	Shakira, Luis Fernando Ochoa	1998	
"Nothing Else Matters/Despedida" (medley)	Shakira: Live from Paris	James Hetfield, Lars Ulrich, Shakira, Pedro Aznar	2011	
"Nunca Me Acuerdo de Olvidarte" †	Shakira	Shakira, John Hill, Tom Hull, Daniel Alexander, Erik Hassle, Robyn Fenty (Rihanna), Jorge Drexler	2014	
"Objection (Tango)"	Laundry Service	Shakira	2001	
"Obtener un Sí"	Fijación Oral Vol. 1	Shakira, Lester Mendez	2005	
"Octavo Día"	Dónde Están los Ladrones?	Shakira, Lester Mendez	1998	
"Ojos Así"	Dónde Están los Ladrones?	Shakira, Javier Garza, Pablo Florez	1998	
"Peligro"	Peligro	Eduardo Paz	1993	
"Perro Fiel"	El Dorado	Shakira, Nick Caminero, Cristhian Mena, Juan Medina	2017	
"Pés Descalços"	Pies Descalzos (Brazilian edition)	Shakira, Luis Fernando Ochoa	1996	
"Pide Más"		Shakira	2003	
"Pídeme el Sol"		Shakira, Luis Fernando Ochoa	2003	
"Pienso en Ti"	Pies Descalzos	Shakira, Luis Fernando Ochoa	1995	
"Pies Descalzos, Sueños Blancos"	Pies Descalzos	Shakira, Luis Fernando Ochoa	1995	
"Poem to a Horse"	Laundry Service	Shakira, Luis Fernando Ochoa	2001	
"Puntería" (with Cardi B)	Las Mujeres Ya No Lloran	David Stewart, Shakira, Carolina Colón, Belcaliz Almanzar, Daniela Blau	2024	
"Pure Intuition"	—N/a	Shakira, Luis Fernando Ochoa	2007	
"Que Me Quedes Tú"	Laundry Service	Shakira, Luis Fernando Ochoa	2001	
"Que Vuelvas"	Dónde Están los Ladrones?	Shakira	1998	
"Quiero"	Pies Descalzos	Shakira, Luis Fernando Ochoa	1995	
"Quince Años"	Peligro	Shakira	1993	
"Rabiosa" (featuring El Cata)	Sale el Sol	Shakira, Pitbull, El Cata	2010	
"Rabiosa" (featuring Pitbull)	Sale el Sol	Shakira, Pitbull, El Cata	2010	
"Ready for the Good Times"	Laundry Service	Shakira, Lester Mendez	2001	
"Rules"	Laundry Service	Shakira, Lester Mendez	2001	
"Sale el Sol"	Sale el Sol	Shakira, Luis Fernando Ochoa	2010	
"Se Quiere, Se Mata"	Pies Descalzos	Shakira, Luis Fernando Ochoa	1995	
"Será, Será (Las Caderas no Mienten)" (featuring Wyclef Jean)	Oral Fixation Vol. 2 (Spanish/Latin American edition)	Shakira, Jerry Duplessis, Wyclef Jean	2006	
"Shakira: Bzrp Music Sessions, Vol. 53" (with Bizarrap)	Las Mujeres Ya No Lloran	Shakira, Keityn, Bizarrap, Santiago Alvarado	2023	
"She Wolf"	She Wolf	Shakira, John Hill, Sam Endicott	2009	
"Sing" (Annie Lennox featuring various artists)	Songs of Mass Destruction	Annie Lennox	2007	
"Si Te Vas"	Dónde Están los Ladrones?	Shakira, Luis Fernando Ochoa	1998	
"Si Tú No Vuelves" (Miguel Bosé featuring Shakira)	Papito	Lanfranco Ferrario, Massimo Grilli, Miguel Bosé	2007	
"Soltera"	TBA	Shakira, Keityn, Édgar Barrera, Bizarrap	2024	
"Sombra de Ti"	Dónde Están los Ladrones?	Shakira, Luis Fernando Ochoa	1998	
"Something"	Oral Fixation Vol. 2	Shakira, Luis Fernando Ochoa	2005	
"Somos El Mundo 25 Por Haiti" (with various artists)	—N/a	Michael Jackson, Lionel Richie, Emilio Estefan, Gloria Estefan	2010	
"Spotlight"	Shakira	Shakira, Hillary Lindsey, Mark Bright	2014	
"Spy" (featuring Wyclef Jean)	She Wolf	Shakira, Wyclef Jean	2009	
"Sueños"	Magia	Shakira	1991	
"Suerte"	Laundry Service	Shakira, Gloria Estefan, Tim Mitchell	2001	
"That Way"	Shakira (Deluxe edition)	Shakira, Olivia Waithe (Livvi Franc), Roy Battle	2014	
"The One Thing"	Shakira	Shakira, Nasri Atweh	2014	
"Te Aviso, Te Anuncio (Tango)"	Laundry Service	Shakira	2001	
"Te Dejo Madrid"	Laundry Service	Shakira, Tim Mitchell, George R. Noriega	2001	
"Te Espero Sentada"	Pies Descalzos	Shakira	1995	
"Te Felicito" (with Rauw Alejandro)	Las Mujeres Ya No Lloran	Shakira, Keityn, Albert Hype, Ily Wonder, Rauw Alejandro, Golden Mindz	2022	
"Te Lo Agradezco, Pero No" (Alejandro Sanz featuring Shakira)	El Tren de los Momentos	Alejandro Sanz	2007	
"Te Necesito"	Pies Descalzos	Shakira, Luis Fernando Ochoa	1995	
"The Day and the Time" (featuring Gustavo Cerati)	Fijación Oral Vol. 1	Gustavo Cerati, Shakira, Luis Fernando Ochoa	2005	
"The One"	Laundry Service	Shakira, Glen Ballard	2001	
"Tiempo Sin Verte"	Las Mujeres Ya No Lloran	Shakira, Marcos Masís, Abner Cordero, Richi López, Elena Rose, Alberto Meléndez	2024	
"Timor"	Oral Fixation Vol. 2	Shakira	2005	
"Todo Para Ti" (Michael Jackson featuring various artists)	—N/a	Michael Jackson, Rubén Blades	2003	
"Todos Juntos" (Dora the Explorer featuring Shakira)	We Did It! Dora's Greatest Hits	George R. Noriega, Joel O. Someillan	2011	
"Toneladas"	El Dorado	Shakira, Luis Fernando Ochoa	2017	
"TQG" (with Karol G)	Las Mujeres Ya No Lloran	Carolina Giraldo(Karol G), Shakira Mebarak (Shakira), Daniel Echavarría, Kevyn Cruz	2023	
"Trap" (with Maluma)	El Dorado	Shakira, Juan Luis Londoño Arias (Maluma), Rene Cano Rios, The Rudeboyz	2017	
"Try Everything"	Zootopia	Sia Furler (Sia), Tor Hermansen, Mikkel Eriksen	2016	
"Tú"	Dónde Están los Ladrones?	Shakira, Dylan O'Brien	1998	
"Tutu (Remix)" (with Camilo and Pedro Capó)	Por Primera Vez	Camilo Echeverry, Jon Leone, Richi Lopez	2019	
"Tu Boca"	Sale el Sol	Shakira, Jorge Drexler, Gustavo Cerati, Tim Mitchell	2010	
"Tú Serás la Historia de Mi Vida"	Peligro	Desmond Child	1993	
"Última"	Las Mujeres Ya No Lloran	Cristian Camilo Alvarez, Kevyn Cruz, Shakira	2024	
"Último Momento"	Peligro	Eduardo Paz	1993	
"Um Pouco De Amor"	Pies Descalzos (Brazilian edition)	Shakira, Luis Fernando Ochoa	1996	
"Un Poco de Amor"	Pies Descalzos	Shakira, Luis Fernando Ochoa	1995	
"Underneath Your Clothes"	Laundry Service	Shakira, Lester Mendez	2001	
"Vuelve"	Pies Descalzos	Shakira, Luis Fernando Ochoa	1995	
"Waka Waka (Esto Es África)" (featuring Freshlyground)	Listen Up! The Official 2010 FIFA World Cup Album	Shakira, John Hill, Freshlyground, Golden Sounds	2010	
"Waka Waka (This Time for Africa)" (featuring Freshlyground)	Listen Up! The Official 2010 FIFA World Cup Album	Shakira, John Hill, Freshlyground, Golden Sounds	2010	
"Waka Waka (Esto Es África)" (K-Mix)	Sale el Sol	Shakira, John Hill, Freshlyground, Golden Sounds	2010	
"Waka Waka (This Time for Africa)" (K-Mix)	Sale el Sol	Shakira, John Hill, Freshlyground, Golden Sounds	2010	
"What More Can I Give" (Michael Jackson featuring various artists)	—N/a	Michael Jackson	2003	
"What We Said" (with Magic!)	El Dorado	Diallo, Shakira, Nasri Atweh, Dadju, Dany Synthé	2017	
"When a Woman"	El Dorado	Shakira, The Arcade, Julia Michaels, Magnus Høiberg (Cashmere Cat), Justin Tranter	2017	
"Whenever, Wherever"	Laundry Service	Shakira, Gloria Estefan, Tim Mitchell	2001	
"Why Wait"	She Wolf	Shakira, Pharrell Williams	2009	
"You Don't Care About Me"	Shakira	Nasri Atweh, Adam Messinger, Chantal Kreviazuk	2014	
"Your Embrace"	Oral Fixation Vol. 2	Shakira, Tim Mitchell	2005	
"Zoo"	Zootopia 2 Soundtrack	Shakira, Ed Sheeran, Blake Slatkin	2025	

== Other songs performed ==
Song	Writer	Live performances	Year
"El Vendedor"	Juan Carlos Calderón, José María Lizar	Vivan los niños	1987
"Quinceañera"	Álvaro Dávila, Memo Méndez Guiú		1988
"Sin Él"	Marco Antonio Solís		1988
"Chica Material"	Peter Brown, Robert Rans	Caribe, Alegre, y Tropical	1989
"La Isla Bonita"	Madonna, Patrick Leonard, Bruce Gaitsch	Caribe, Alegre, y Tropical	1989
"Será el Ángel"	Marco Mancilla, Richard Mancilla	Caribe, Alegre, y Tropical	1989
"Mama África"	Francisco César Gonçalves, George Thomaz	Programa Livre, Las Mujeres Ya No Lloran World Tour	1997, 2025
"De Música Ligera"	Zeta Bosio, Gustavo Cerati	La Rata Caliente	1997
"Love is a Battlefield"	Mike Chapman, Holly Knight	VH1 Divas Las Vegas	2001
"Dude (Looks Like a Lady)"	Steven Tyler, Joe Perry, Desmond Child	Tour of the Mongoose	2002–2003
"Te Olvidé" (with Joe Arroyo in 2007; with Chelito de Castro and Tatiana Angulo Fernández in 2025)	Antonio María Peñaloza	Oral Fixation Tour (in Barranquilla), Las Mujeres Ya No Lloran World Tour (in Barranquilla)	2006, 2025
"La Rebelión"	Joe Arroyo	Oral Fixation Tour (in Barranquilla)	2007
"En la Ciudad de la Furia" (with Gustavo Cerati)	Gustavo Cerati	Concierto ALAS	2008
"No Es lo Mismo" (with Alejandro Lerner, Alejandro Sanz, Calle 13, Fito Paez, Gustavo Cerati, Jorge Drexler, La Portuaria, Mercedes Sosa, Pedro Aznar and Paulina Rubio)	Alejandro Sanz	Concierto ALAS	2008
"La Gota Fría" (with Carlos Vives)	Emiliano Zuleta Baquero	Gran Concierto por la Paz (Charity concert)	2008
"Higher Ground" (Stevie Wonder & Usher featuring Shakira)	Stevie Wonder	Lincoln Memorial "We Are One"	2009
"No Hay Nadie Como Tú" (with Calle 13)	R. Ortega, E. Arroyo, J. Arroyo, René Pérez, Eduardo Cabra	Coliseo Jose M. Agrelot, San Juan, Puerto Rico	2009
"Santa Baby"	Joan Javits, Philip Springer, Tony Springer	Christmas in Rockefeller Center	2009
"Sólo le pido a Dios"	León Gieco	Unidos Por Haití (Charity concert)	2010
"País Tropical" (with Ivete Sangalo)	Jorge Ben	The Sun Comes Out World Tour (at Rock in Rio)	2011
"Need You Now" (with Blake Shelton)	Josh Kear, Lady Antebellum (Dave Haywood, Charles Kelley, Hillary Scott)	The Voice	2013
"En Barranquilla me quedo"	Álvaro José Arroyo González	Latin Grammy Awards 2011 Person of the Year event, Las Mujeres Ya No Lloran World Tour (in Barranquilla)	2011, 2025
"Imagine"	John Lennon	United Nations General Assembly 2015	2015
"A Sky Full of Stars" (with Coldplay)	Guy Berryman, Jonny Buckland, Will Champion, Chris Martin, Tim Bergling	Global Citizen Festival Hamburg	2017
"Ven Devórame Otra Vez"	Palmer Hernández	Sabritas commercial	2023
"Sin Sentimiento"	Jairo Varela	Las Mujeres Ya No Lloran World Tour (in Cali)	2025
"Sombras"	Jose Maria Contursi, Francisco Lomuto	Las Mujeres Ya No Lloran World Tour (in Mexico City)	2025
"O Leãozinho" (with Caetano Veloso)	Caetano Veloso	Todo Mundo no Rio 2026	2026
"O Que É, o Que É" (with Maria Bethânia)	Luiz Gonzaga Júnior	Todo Mundo no Rio 2026	2026
"Corazón Partío" (with Alejandro Sanz)	Alejandro Sanz	Las Mujeres Ya No Lloran World Tour (in Madrid)	2026

== Unreleased songs ==
- "Africa"
- "Anywhere Everywhere"
- "Bad Weather"
- "Blinded Speechless" ("Ciega, Sordomuda" English version)
- "Classic"
- "Confection (feat. Gwen Stefani)"
- "Doubt"
- "Enough Heaven to Cry" (unofficially referred to as "Come Down Love" and "Safe and Fast")
- "Encariñada"
- "Entre Tus Brazos" ("En Tus Pupilas" alternate version)
- "Everything I Want"
- "Falling Down"
- "I Could Fall in Love with You"
- "I Don't Wanna Feel"
- "I Am Here" ("Estoy Aquí" English version)
- "If Life Is a River"
- "Inevitable" (English Version)
- "La Tortura" (Portuguese version)
- "Libertad" (ft. Calle 13)
- "Lo Mío"
- "Mad about You" ("Boig per Tu" English version)
- "Mad Love" (with Sean Paul & David Guetta)(originally titled "Temple")
- "Make You Blue"
- "Move Your Body"
- "Nassau" (English version)
- "No Joke"
- "One"
- "Our Image"
- "Peace on Earth"
- "Peça-me"
- "Police Escort"
- "Quiero Más"
- "Resignación" (Re-recorded by Spanish singer Ainhoa Cantalapiedra on her debut album Esencia natural)
- "Roll with It"
- "Send Me an Angel"
- "Shadows of You" ("Sombra de Ti" English version)
- "She Wolf" (French version)
- "Skrt on Me"
- "Sunrise"
- "Superwoman"
- "Take Me Higher"
- "Te Sigo"
- "The Border" (featuring Wyclef Jean)
- "The Child Will Fly"
  (Roger Waters featuring Eric Clapton, Gustavo Cerati, Pedro Aznar, Shakira)
- "There's a Time"
- "Understanding"
- "Vamos"
- "We'll Never Know"
- "We're Back"
- "Western Surf"
- "When You're Gone" (released by Jon Secada in 2000)
- "You" ("Tú" English version)
