= Love in the Time of Cholera (film) =

2007 film directed by Mike Newell

- Theatrical release poster
- Directed by: Mike Newell
- Screenplay by: Ronald Harwood
- Based on: Love in the Time of Cholera by Gabriel García Márquez
- Produced by: Scott Steindorff
- Starring: Javier Bardem; Giovanna Mezzogiorno; Benjamin Bratt; Catalina Sandino Moreno; Hector Elizondo; Liev Schreiber; Ana Claudia Talancón; Fernanda Montenegro; Laura Harring; John Leguizamo
- Cinematography: Affonso Beato
- Edited by: Mick Audsley
- Music by: Antonio Pinto; Shakira
- Production companies: Stone Village Pictures; Grosvenor Park
- Distributed by: New Line Cinema (United States); Summit Entertainment (International)
- Release date: November 16, 2007
- Running time: 139 minutes
- Country: United States
- Language: English
- Budget: $50 million
- Box office: $31 million

Love in the Time of Cholera is a 2007 American romantic drama film directed by Mike Newell. Based on the 1985 novel of the same name by the Colombian Nobel Prize-winning author Gabriel García Márquez, it tells the story of love between Fermina Daza (played by Giovanna Mezzogiorno) and her lover, Florentino Ariza (Javier Bardem) and her husband Juvenal Urbino (Benjamin Bratt) which spans 50 years, from 1880 to 1930.

It is the first filming of a García Márquez novel by a Hollywood studio, rather than by Latin American or Italian directors. It is also the first English-language work of Academy Award-nominated Brazilian actress Fernanda Montenegro, who portrays Tránsito Ariza. Shakira wrote two original songs, "Hay Amores" and "Despedida", for the film.

== Plot ==
In late 19th-century Cartagena, a river port in Colombia, Florentino Ariza falls in love at first sight with Fermina Daza. They secretly correspond, and she eventually agrees to marry him, but her father discovers their relationship and sends her to stay with distant relatives (mainly her grandmother and niece). When she returns some years later, Fermina agrees to marry Dr. Juvenal Urbino, who treated her once, stating she doesn't love Florentino anymore. Their 50-year marriage is outwardly loving but inwardly marred by darker emotions. Florentino feels devastated, who vows to remain a virgin, but his self-denial is thwarted by a tryst.

To help Florentino get over Fermina, his mother throws a willing widow into his bed, and Florentino discovers that sex is a very good pain reliever, one he uses to replace the opium that he had habitually smoked. Florentino begins to record and describe each of his sexual encounters, beginning with the widow, and eventually compiles over 600 entries.

Now a lowly clerk, Florentino plods resolutely over many years to approach the wealth and social standing of Dr. Urbino. When the now-elderly doctor dies suddenly, Florentino immediately and impertinently resumes courting Fermina.

== Cast ==
- Javier Bardem as Florentino Ariza
  - Unax Ugalde as Young Florentino Ariza
- Giovanna Mezzogiorno as Fermina Daza
- Benjamin Bratt as Dr. Juvenal Urbino
- John Leguizamo as Lorenzo Daza
- Fernanda Montenegro as Tránsito Ariza
- Catalina Sandino Moreno as Hildebranda Sánchez
- Alicia Borrachero as Escolástica
- Liev Schreiber as Lotario Thurgot
- Laura Harring as Sara Noriega
- Hector Elizondo as Don Leo
- Ana Claudia Talancón as Olimpia Zuleta
- Angie Cepeda as The Widow Nazaret
- Patricia Castañeda as Grand Lady 4
- Marcela Mar as America Vicuña
- Paola Turbay as Mystery Woman 2

== Production ==
=== Film locations ===
Much of the film takes place in the historic, walled city of Cartagena in Colombia. Some screen shots showed the Magdalena River and the Sierra Nevada de Santa Marta mountain range.

=== Title sequence ===
The London-based animation studio VooDooDog created the title and end sequences, which draw inspiration from the colors and atmosphere of South America.

We put a lot of effort into the line test stage, studying time-lapse flowers footage and getting the twisting feeling of the tendrils and flowers opening before committing to the hand painting stage. I am sure no one other than fussy designers notice, but we think it was worth the effort rather than just making a straight computerised sequence.

— Donnellon

== Reception ==
=== Gabriel García Márquez ===
According to an interview by Colombian magazine Revista Semana, Scott Steindorff, producer of the film, showed an unreleased final edition of the film to Gabriel García Márquez in Mexico who, at the end of the film, is said to have exclaimed "Bravo!" with a smile on his face.

=== Critical response ===
On Rotten Tomatoes, the film has an approval rating of 26% based on reviews from 111 critics, with an average rating of 4.7/10. The website's critical consensus reads, "Though beautifully filmed, the makers of Love in the Time of Cholera fail to transfer the novel's magic to the screen." On Metacritic, the film had an average score of 43 out of 100, based on 29 reviews, indicating "mixed or average" reviews.

Time rated it "D" and described it as "a serious contender [for] the worst movie ever made from a great novel ... Skip the film; reread the book."

Lisa Schwarzbaum of Entertainment Weekly, gave it a "D" rating and called it a "turgid and lifeless movie adaptation", opining that "those who have read Gabriel García Márquez's glowing and sexy 1988 novel about one man's grand love for a woman who marries another are bound to be peevishly disappointed ... those who haven't read the book will now never understand the ardor of those who have — at least not based on all the hammy traipsing and coupling and scene-hopping thrown together here."

In the Los Angeles Times, Carina Chocano stated, "the novel has made it to the screen in the form of a plodding, tone-deaf, overripe, overheated Oscar-baiting telenovela ... Doubtless it's an enormously daunting task to adapt a book at once so sweeping and internal, so swooningly romantic and philosophical, but it takes a lighter touch and a more expansive view than Newell and Harwood seem to bring."

"Despedida", written for the film by Shakira and Antônio Pinto, was nominated for a Golden Globe for Best Song.

=== Box office ===
In its opening weekend in the United States and Canada, the film ranked #10 at the box office, grossing $1.9 million in 852 theaters.
