= Un Poco de Amor (disambiguation) =

"Un Poco de Amor" is a 1996 song by Shakira from Pies Descalzos.

Un Poco de Amor (Spanish for: A little bit of love) may also refer to:

- Un Poco de Amor, a 1983 album by Guillermo Dávila.
- "Un Poco de Amor", a 2008 Spanish cover of "Somebody to Love" as sung by Edurne

== See also ==
- "Un poco de tu amor" (A Little Bit of Your Love), a 2005 song by RBD
