= Calle 13 =

Calle 13 may refer to:

- Calle 13 (TV channel), a Spanish-based cable/satellite channel
- Calle 13 (band), a Puerto Rican urban/hip hop band
  - Calle 13 (album), their debut album
  - The namesake of the group, a street in Puerto Rico
