= Todo Mundo no Rio 2026 =

Concert by Shakira in Rio de Janeiro

- Megashow concert by Shakira
- Location: Rio de Janeiro, Brazil
- Venue: Copacabana Beach
- Date: 2 May 2026

Todo Mundo no Rio 2026 is an upcoming free concert by Colombian singer-songwriter Shakira, scheduled to take place on 2 May 2026 at Copacabana Beach in Rio de Janeiro, Brazil. The performance is expected to attract an estimated audience of over two million people making it the biggest show of her career. It is organized by the Rio de Janeiro City Hall with production by Bonus Track Entretenimento. The event will be broadcast live and on real-time on TV Globo, Globoplay and Multishow.

== Background ==
After the release of her twelfth studio album Las Mujeres Ya No Lloran (2024) and the success of her Las Mujeres Ya No Lloran World Tour, Shakira was officially confirmed as the headliner for the 2026 Copacabana Megashow in Rio de Janeiro. The announcement was made on 11 February 2026 by Eduardo Paes, the mayor of Rio de Janeiro. Shakira's concert is the third installment of the Todo Mundo no Rio show series, which is a municipal program designed to position the city as a global hub for major events by hosting free large-scale concert performances on the Copacabana beach. The 2026 show follows the previous ones by Madonna in 2024 and Lady Gaga in 2025. Shakira stated her show is dedicated to Latina women.

The entire structure for the show has a size of 1500 sq m with a 25 meters long walkway, and 16 led screens sized 45 sq m each are installed across the beach. Preparations for the stage situated near the Copacabana Palace faced a brief disruption on 26 April, when construction was halted following the accidental death of a worker on-site. Work resumed the following day after a safety investigation, with the show remaining on schedule.

Four days before the event, the acting governor of the state of Rio de Janeiro, Ricardo Couto, cancelled a sponsorship of 15 million reais that the government was going to give to the event, which led the city hall to increase its counterpart in an emergency in order not to jeopardize the event. Both the city's mayor, Eduardo Cavaliere, and the former mayor, Eduardo Paes, praised the measure, arguing that it is the role of the city hall and not the state government to sponsor the event, given that state finances are in deficit.

== Impact ==
=== Cultural impact ===
The upcoming show triggered a city-wide "Shaki" mode phenomenon, characterized by massive Shakira billboards and the playful renaming of the beach to "Lobacabana" in honor of Shakira's "She Wolf" nickname. Mass public dance classes focused on Shakira's iconic dance choreography were held on the Copacabana beach. Street vendors created unique fan merchandise, such as "Shakira's tears". The show attracted fans from across Latin America to witness the concert with weekly flight's to Rio increasing by 80 % compared to 2024.

=== Economic impact ===
Before the event, Rio de Janeiro city officials and tourism boards projected an attendance of approximately 2 million people for Shakira's megashow with an estimated economic impact of R$ 800 million for the local economy.
