= Poem to a Horse =

2004 song by Shakira

- Artwork for the promotional CD single for the live version

Promotional single by Shakira

from the album Live & off the Record
- Released: February 13, 2004
- Studio: The Hit Factory Criteria (Miami, FL); Crescent Moon Studios (Miami, FL); Compass Point Studios (Nassau, Bahamas); Nomad Music (Miami, FL)
- Venue: Rotterdam Ahoy (Rotterdam, Netherlands)
- Genre: Rock; soul
- Length: 4:09
- Label: Epic
- Composers: Shakira; Luis Fernando Ochoa
- Lyricist: Shakira
- Producer: Shakira

Shakira singles chronology
"The One" (2003)	"Poem to a Horse" (2004)	"La Tortura" (2005)

Music video
- "Poem to a Horse" on YouTube

"Poem to a Horse" is a song recorded by Colombian singer-songwriter Shakira for her first English-language studio album, Laundry Service (2001). The live version of track was released as a promotional single for Shakira's second live album Live & off the Record (2004). A rock and soul song written by Shakira and Luis Fernando Ochoa, lyrically it discusses marijuana addiction and narcissism. Shakira produced the track, with additional production by Ochoa.

== Background and release ==
"I used the literary figure of personification, but in reverse: instead of turning an object into an animal or a person, I did the opposite."

— Shakira on "Poem to a Horse".

"Poem to a Horse" was initially released as the ninth track off Shakira's fifth studio album Laundry Service (2001). In 2002, Shakira embarked on Tour of the Mongoose to promote the album, and "Poem to a Horse" was included on the setlist. The tour date in Rotterdam on 22 April 2003 was recorded, and most of it was released on 30 March 2004 under the title Live & off the Record. "Poem to a Horse (Live)" was released as a promotional single off the live album, getting a CD release as the only track, and as a double single with "Whenever, Wherever (Live)". An edited version of the live recording was also released with the lines referencing drugs muted.

"Poem to a Horse" is a rock and soul song featuring guitars and horns as prominent instruments. Its lyrics delve into social criticism via the theme of a relationship ending due to the partner's marijuana addiction. It portrays Shakira's frustration with her partner, who is more interested in marijuana than engaging with her. The lyrics describe the partner's use of "hydroponic pot" to feed his "empty brain," highlighting mental deterioration. Shakira uses the metaphor of 'poem to a horse' to illustrate the futility of communicating with someone so detached. The lyrics also critique how the societal encouragement of narcissism strains relationships. In 2021, Shakira admitted the song being one of her boldest ventures into poetic expression, as in its lyrics she likened her romantic partner to a horse.

== Reception ==
In an album review, Alexis Petridis from The Guardian described how "Poem to a Horse" "mixes Nirvana-influenced guitars with a soul horn section to mind-boggling effect". Jessica Roiz from Billboard wrote how "younger Shak is known for hits like 'Si Te Vas', [...] and 'Poem to a Horse', where she strong and proudly walks away from a narcissist." Isabelia Herrera of Pitchfork dubbed the song as an "anti-drug hymn", and compared the "fervid" horns and riffs to Nirvana's work. Cabeza de Gato ranked the song in their list of 10 songs with Shakira's most intelligent lyrics.

== Music video ==
The music video for "Poem to a Horse" was released in February 2004. The video contains a live performance of the song at the Tour of the Mongoose date in Rotterdam as well as clips from her ‘’Live & off the Record’’ documentary.

== Live performances ==
"Poem to a Horse" was performed by Shakira on Tour of the Mongoose in 2002-2003. According to a photograph published by Albert Menéndez from Shakira's band, the song is on the setlist of Shakira's 2025 Las Mujeres Ya No Lloran World Tour.

== Track listings ==
CD single: Poem to a Horse (Live)

1. "Poem to a Horse" - 4:08
2. "Poem to a Horse" (Live) - 5:11

CD single: Poem To A Horse (Live) / Whenever, Wherever (Live)

1. "Poem to a Horse" (Live) - 5:11
2. "Whenever, Wherever" (Live Radio Edit) - 3:31
3. "Whenever, Wherever" (Live) - 5:28

== Charts ==
Weekly chart performance for "Poem to a Horse"
Chart (2004)	Peak position
Uruguay (Notimex)	1
