= Hay Amores =

Single by Shakira

from the EP Love in the Time of Cholera
- Released: 5 February 2008
- Recorded: 2007
- Genre: Bolero
- Length: 3:28
- Label: Epic; New Line
- Composers: Shakira; Antônio Pinto
- Lyricist: Shakira
- Producers: Shakira; Antônio Pinto; Pedro Aznar

Shakira singles chronology
"Si Tú No Vuelves" (2007)	"Hay Amores" (2008)	"She Wolf" (2009)

Music video
- "Hay Amores" on YouTube

"Hay Amores" (English: "There Are Loves") is a song by Colombian singer-songwriter Shakira for the extended play and soundtrack Love in the Time of Cholera (2008). Shakira wrote the song for the Mike Newell-directed 2007 film adaptation of 1985 novel Love in the Time of Cholera by Colombian author Gabriel García Márquez. The song's music was co-written by Shakira and Brazilian film score composer Antônio Pinto. Shakira was initially offered a role by the producers of the movie to take part as the main protagonist. However, she refused the offer, instead collaborating with the musical team due to her friendship with García Márquez. "Hay Amores" is a romantic and elegiac bolero song. Lyrically, the song describes the kind of love that only grows fonder as time passes. The song won a Premios Nuestra Tierra award in the Best Movie Soundtrack category.

== Background and release ==
"Shakira's music has a personal seal which does not sound like anyone else and nobody can sing and dance like she does, at whatever age, with a sensuality that innocent that seems to be her own invention".

— Gabriel García Márquez, 1999.

In 1999, Colombian writer Gabriel García Márquez met Shakira. He conducted an interview with her for Cambio magazine. At the time of the publication of the article, García Márquez expressed Shakira's originality in the music scene. Following this, both of them established friendly relations with one another. In late 2006, filming began for a movie adaptation of García Márquez's 1985 novel Love in the Time of Cholera (1985). The story revolves around the character of Florentino Ariza and his unwavering affection for the stunning Fermina Daza, and the emotional entanglement that involves a local doctor".

Initially, the producers of the movie offered Shakira a role in it, which would mark her cinematic debut. However, she turned down the offer, claiming that she was not comfortable with the nude scenes that were featured in the movie. Nevertheless, Shakira offered to compose the score of the movie due to her friendship with García Márquez and his influence on her. She started working on the music for the movie with Argentine composer Pedro Aznar in London during the second half of 2007. Shakira spontaneously came up with the melody of "Hay Amores"'s chorus after seeing an early cut of the film, humming it to the film's director Mike Newell. Later during the recording sessions, Shakira recorded "Despedida" and "Hay Amores", the latter being the movie's theme song. Shakira commented on the song's genre that bolero is "the pinnacle of romantic music" and that it is "in her blood". During the release of the movie in November 2007, Shakira elaborated in an interview: "Being part of the movie was a personal motivation because it is an extraordinary novel of one of the most extraordinary writers in history and a personal friend [...] [While composing the songs, I wanted] to present my country's beauty and the works of García Márquez". Shakira stated in an interview in 2019 that "Hay Amores" and "Despedida" are her "two best songs to date". In October 2007, "Hay Amores" premiered on radio in Colombia. The song was released as a CD single on 5 February 2008.

In 2012, Shakira recorded and released a new version of the song on SoundCloud with her father William Mebarak to celebrate his birthday. A video of the two recording the song was uploaded to YouTube and Facebook.

== Composition ==
"Hay Amores" is a bolero song that lyrically delves into the thoughts and reflections that love can give. It explores love as a selfless devotion to others, portraying it as a physical and spiritual union that merges individual lives and experiences. The instrumental of "Hay Amores" features subdued trumpets, the sound of which has been described to evoke "some long-ago nightclub."

== Reception and accolades ==
In a soundtrack review, Thom Jurek from AllMusic commented that the three songs by Shakira, "Hay Amores", "Despedida" and "Pienso En Ti", make the soundtrack "worth paying your hard-earned money for". John Li from MovieXclusive highlighted the tenderness of the soundtrack, while describing "Hay Amores" as "seductively beautiful" and noting that all three of Shakira's songs are "accompanied by [her] signature vocals". Eduardo Verano de la Rosa, the Governor of Atlántico, wrote for Colombian La República about "Hay Amores", describing how Shakira sings her "rich poetry" with her "sweet, youthful voice", and called the lyrical metaphor of the Magdalena River merging with the sea "close to perfection."

"Hay Amores" received a Premio Nuestra Tierra for Best Movie Soundtrack. It was nominated for a Premio Oye! in the category of Best Theme for a Soap Opera, Film or Television Series.

== Music video ==
The music video for "Hay Amores" was filmed in Cartagena. It was directed by Vincent Passeri and has a sensual and melancholic ambiance. The video features Shakira performing the track wearing a red dress, as well as some scenes from the film. The video was released in January 2008, and uploaded to YouTube in 2020.

== Live performances ==
Shakira performed "Hay Amores" and "Pienso en Ti" at the premiere of the film in November 2007. Regarding her performance, Shakira confessed that she was able to fulfill her dream of bringing traditional instruments like the charango and rhythms like the bolero to her music, narrating a lament from the Andes. She arrived at the event dressed in a turquoise dress and accompanied by her boyfriend, Antonio de la Rúa. In July 2008, she performed "Hay Amores" for more than 75 000 people at Rock In Rio Madrid 2008, where she dedicated her performance to Íngrid Betancourt and to "all those who fight for freedom." La Capital reported how her performance "drove Madrid crazy."

== Credits ==
- Lyrics – Shakira
- Producer – Shakira
- Music - Shakira, Antônio Pinto
- Co-producers - Antônio Pinto, Pedro Aznar

== Charts ==
=== Weekly charts ===
Weekly chart performance for "Hay Amores"
Chart (2008)	Peak position
CIS Airplay (TopHit)	147
