= Despedida (Shakira song) =

Song by Shakira

from the EP Love in the Time of Cholera
- Recorded: 2007
- Studio: London, England
- Genre: Bolero, folk
- Length: 2:51
- Label: Epic; New Line
- Composers: Shakira; Antônio Pinto
- Lyricist: Shakira
- Producers: Shakira; Pedro Aznar

Live video
- "Nothing Else Matters/Despedida" on YouTube

"Despedida" (English: "Farewell") is a song by Colombian singer-songwriter Shakira for the extended play and soundtrack Love in the Time of Cholera (2008). She produced the track and wrote the lyrics to it, while co-composed its music with Brazilian Antônio Pinto. Pedro Aznar also co-produced it. The song was recorded for the Mike Newell-directed 2007 movie adaptation of Colombian writer Gabriel García Márquez's 1985 novel Love in the Time of Cholera. Shakira was initially offered a role by the producers of the movie to take part as the main protagonist. However, she refused the offer and accepted to collaborate with the musical team due to her friendship with García Márquez. Musically, "Despedida" is a folk song which discusses nostalgic love sentiments towards a person the protagonist lost.

Although the movie received unfavorable reviews from critics, "Despedida" was praised by music reviewers for depicting the novel's spirit. "Despedida" was nominated for a Golden Globe Award in the category for Best Original Song at the award ceremony held in 2008. The song managed to appear on the Billboard Latin Digital Songs charts due to digital downloads following its release on the EP. Shakira performed it live during the screening of the movie and at the stops of her The Sun Comes Out World Tour (2010–11) where she sang it as a medley with "Nothing Else Matters" (1992) by American band Metallica. The National Symphony Orchestra of Colombia performed the song live during a homage following García Márquez's death in 2014.

== Background ==
"Shakira's music has a personal seal which does not sound like anyone else and nobody can sing and dance like she does, at whatever age, with a sensuality that innocent that seems to be her own invention".

— Gabriel García Márquez, 1999.

In 1999, Colombian writer Gabriel García Márquez met Shakira. He conducted an interview with her for Colombian magazine Cambio. At the time of the publication of the article, García Márquez expressed Shakira's originality in the music scene. Following this, both of them established friendly relations with one another. During late 2006, the filming of the 2007 movie adaptation of García Márquez's novel Love in the Time of Cholera (1985) started. The story revolves around the character of Florentino Ariza and "his unconditional love for the beautiful Fermina Daza and the sentimental triangle that develops with the regional doctor".

Initially, the producers of the movie offered Shakira a role in it, which would mark her cinematic debut. However, she turned down the offer, claiming that she was not comfortable with the nude scenes that were featured in the movie. Nevertheless, Shakira offered to compose the score of the movie due to her friendship with García Márquez and his influence on her. She started working for the material of the movie with Argentine composer Pedro Aznar in London, England during the second half of 2007. During the sessions, the duo produced "Despedida" and "Hay Amores", the latter being the movie's theme song. "Despedida" was described as a folk song which discusses the melancholy of losing a beloved person. According to Gerardo González from La Nación, the song appears in the "key parts of the movie's plot to emphasize the actors' emotions". During the release of the movie in November 2007, Shakira elaborated in an interview: "Being part of the movie was a personal motivation because it is an extraordinary novel of one of the most extraordinary writers in history and a personal friend [...] [while composing the songs I wanted] to present my country's beauty and the works of García Márquez".

== Critical reception ==
In the review of the soundtrack, Thom Jurek from the website AllMusic commented that Shakira's song on the EP which included "not only traditional instruments but folk song structures (no pop)" give buyers "something worth paying [their] hard-earned money for". John Li from the website Moviexclusive commented that "Despedida" is "emotionally powerful", and noted that all three of Shakira's songs are "accompanied by [her] signature vocals". Elkin Lara of Caracol Radio wrote, "In 'La Despedida' Shakira once again proves her capacity of transforming herself and how she can be oped to every kind of project and music challenge". Ricardo Sandoval and Eduardo Neira, a literary and a cinema critic respectively, wrote that the song sticks out for saving the movie and "preserving the spirit of Gabriel García Márquez's novel more than the movie itself".

"Despedida" received a nomination at the 65th Golden Globe Awards in the category for Best Original Song, but lost to "Guaranteed" by Eddie Vedder from the movie Into the Wild (2007). Additionally, the track was pre-selectioned for a nomination of an Academy Award for Best Original Song but did not manage to place itself at the 80th Academy Awards. It was also nominated for a World Soundtrack Award for Best Original Song Written Directly for a Film at the 2008 awards ceremony.

== Live performances ==
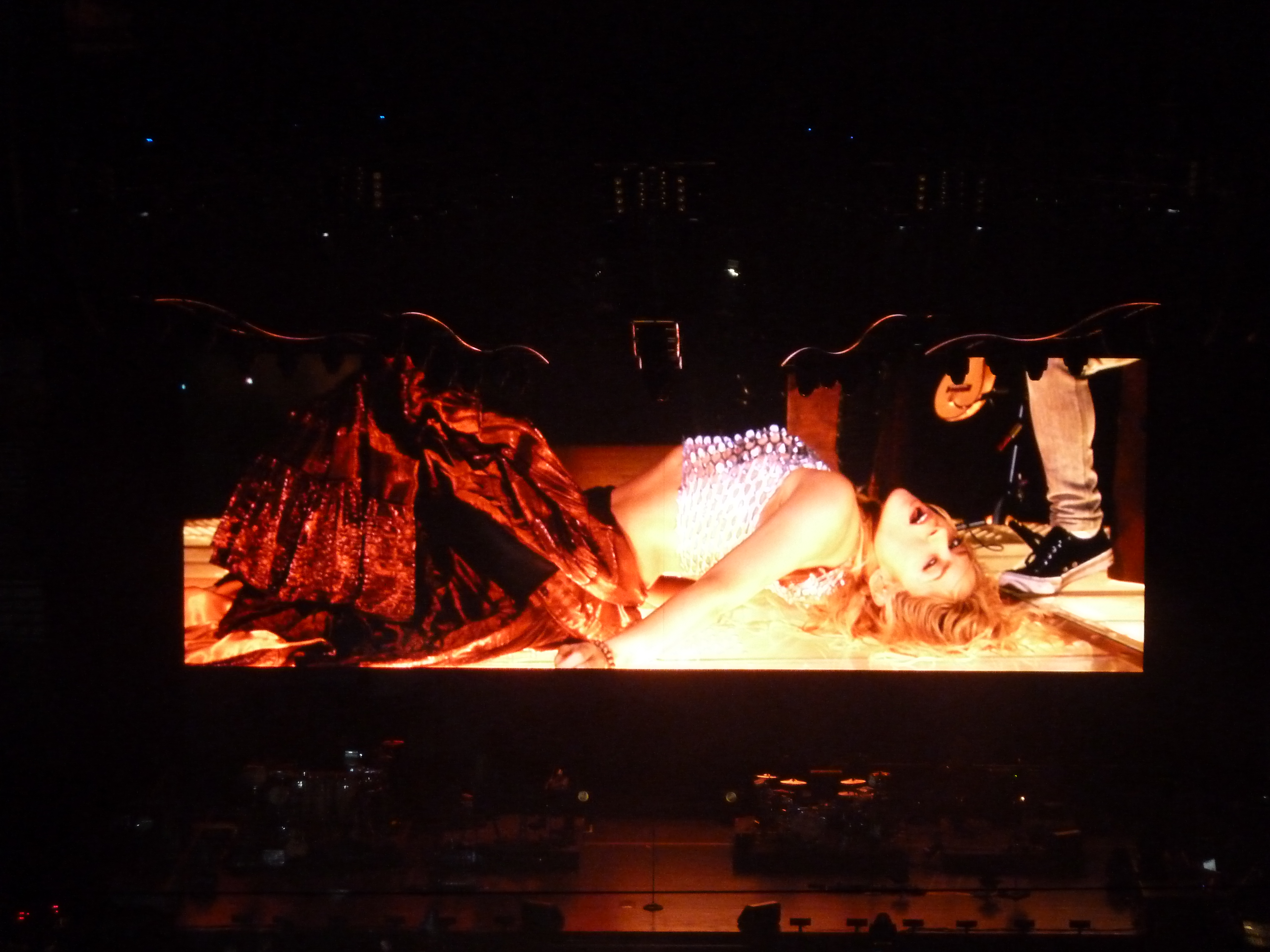
Shakira singing "Despedida" during a date of The Sun Comes Out World Tour (2010-11) in Madrid

On November 6, 2007, Shakira accompanied by her then-boyfriend Antonio de la Rúa, appeared on the screening of the movie Love in the Time of Cholera in Las Vegas, Nevada and confirmed that three of her own songs would be included on the soundtrack album. During the evening, Shakira performed all those three songs - "Hay amores", "Despedida" and "Pienso en ti". The same night, she confirmed that the money gathered from the entry tickets would be donated to her Barefoot Foundation.

Shakira included "Despedida" on the setlist of her The Sun Comes Out World Tour (2010–11), where she performed it as a medley with "Nothing Else Matters" (1992), by American band Metallica. For the performance she was dressed with a crop top and a red skirt. Jon Pareles from The New York Times praised her performance in New York, saying that "she used her body, with a girlish grin and dance moves of finely calibrated sensuality: angular hip twitches and smooth slow-motion swivels, chest thrusts and sinuous wrist turns, as if her every joint rotates 360 degrees". A writer of Sprinning Platters praised the performance of the song, calling it a "seductive dance number in which she managed to test the skill and professionalism of her drummer by incorporating him into her moves", further dubbing it a "'you had to be here' moment". The live performance of "Despedida" was included on her album Live from Paris (2011) which was filmed during the concerts held on June 13 and 14 at the Palais Omnisports de Paris-Bercy. It was also made available for purchase on the iTunes Store and released to the singer's official Vevo account on January 11, 2012.

Following García Márquez's death in 2014, the National Symphony Orchestra of Colombia held an homage concert in his honor on April 30, 2015 at the Teatro Colón in Bogotá. Paul Dury led the concert where tributes of the songs from the soundtrack of Love in the Time of Cholera were performed. During the concert, Manuela Pinto, the daughter of compositor Antônio Pinto, and artist Cecilia Silva Caraballo sang a version of "Despedida" accompanied by Colombian and Brazilian musicians who played traditional instruments including a marimba.

== Charts ==
On December 24, 2011, "Despedida" debuted and peaked at No. 32 on the Billboard Hot Latin Digital Songs following the release of the album Live in Paris. It also managed to peak on the component US Latin Pop Digital Songs chart.

Chart (2008–11)	Peak position
ERROR in "CIS": Invalid position: 265. Expected number 1–200 or dash (–).
US Latin Digital Songs	32
US Latin Pop Digital Songs	13
