= Shakira live performances =

Shakira has given many live performances throughout her career, including concerts in different countries, appearances on TV shows, music festivals, charity events, sports events, awards ceremonies, and more. Most of these performances have been televised, recorded on CDs, and shared online; some are available for sale.

She debuted in the 90s by performing at award shows and Latin programs. Her performance in the Super Bowl Halftime Show with Jennifer Lopez became the most-watched Halftime Show on streaming platforms, in addition to having 103 million television viewers. Shakira's name generated over 2.6 million tweets, which was more than the Super Bowl itself (1.85 million) placing her at number one on trending topics. Her presentation in 2005 with Alejandro Sanz at the MTV Awards, where they sang "La Tortura," was the first time a song was presented entirely in Spanish in the history of the awards. Shakira's first international tour in 2001, called "Tour of the Mongoose," was described as "the greatest show in the history of Colombia."

Her "Oral Fixation World Tour" was the highest-grossing concert series for a Latina artist to date. According to Pollstar, Shakira has sold more than 2.7 million tickets from 2000 to 2020.

Shakira's concerts have been called "top-tier pop shows," attracting diverse audiences from various social classes, sexual orientations, ethnicities, and religions. Her presentations are characterized by having "her own unique style." Some journalists say that her show focuses more on the "artistic" and not so much on production. She often performs barefoot, wears minimal makeup and natural hairstyle, and has no background dancers in her performances, preferring to focus on her voice, dance moves, and stage presence. Other artists have imitated her performances, including Peruvian singer and model Leslie Shaw who gave a performance inspired by Shakira's performance at the 2000 Latin Grammy Awards, where she performed her song "Ojos Así" from her album Dónde Están los Ladrones?.

== Reviews ==
Shakira concerts have been reviewed by media outlets including Rolling Stone and Billboard. Her concerts are considered an "explosion of culture" where she can attract audiences from all over the world. According to Pollstar, Shakira has sold more than 2 million concert tickets from the 2000s to the present. Shakira's performances in concerts and other events have broken attendance records. Some of her concerts have been analyzed by university students who review her scenery in more depth. Some of her performances were innovative in countries like Peru where she revolutionized the lighting system during her concert offered at "La Feria del Hogar."

== Production ==
Shakira's concerts have always been described as artistic, not so focused on production, costumes, nor dancers. This has impacted several Hispanic female artists like Rosalía to trust their talents and their roots instead of their looks. A 2012 analysis her concerts "Tour Anfibio" and the "Oral Fixation Tour" by the University of Lima called them a more profound observation of the psychology of color present in both concerts and the designs of each stage highlighting the absence of production.

== Decade of 1990 ==
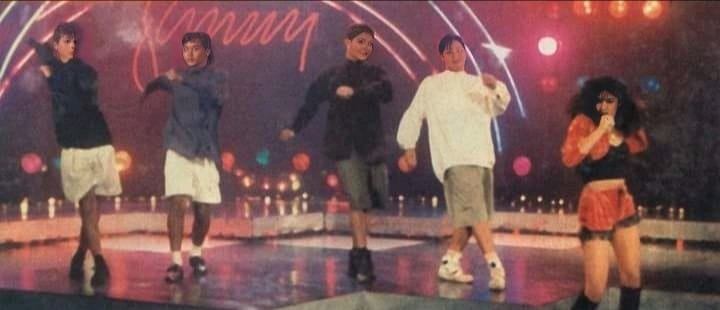
Shakira performing one of her song from her album debut Magia.

=== Viña del Mar (1993) ===
Shakira, at only 16 years of age, in 1993, gave her first performance at the Viña del Mar festival in the country of Chile, representing Colombia. She performed her song "Eres" from her album Peligro. She came in third place in the competition. But the Spanish magazine El Tiempo later wrote, "With this presentation began the journey of the star of Barranquilla." According to the media and Shakira herself, this concert was a pivotal moment in her career as well as her first big step on the international stage.

=== Feria del Hogar (1996) ===
In 1996, Shakira was invited to perform in Peru during the annual event "Feria del hogar" for its 30th anniversary where she performed several of her famous songs up to then from her first international album Pies Descalzos managing to put on a show two consecutive days. With an audience of 20,000 people, some magazines describe this presentation as the beginning of her popularity in the Peruvian public that would make it a youth phenomenon during the 90s. Shakira's show given at the "Feria del Hogar" is described as "one of the most remembered moments in the history of the festival"

=== MTV Unplugged (1999) ===
In 1999, Shakira was invited by MTV to record an MTV Unplugged from her album ¿Dónde Están los Ladrones? There were a total of three concerts given, the one held at the Grand Ballroom in New York City. Although at the beginning Shakira had contemplated using wild animals such as snakes and tigers while interpreting her songs, although the idea was discarded for the safety of the public. The show awarded was highly acclaimed by the media, positioning her show as one of the best MTV Unplugged in history and her specific performance of "Sombra de tí" is considered one of the best presentations made at those events.

== Decade of 2000 ==
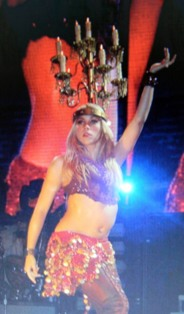
Shakira dancing her song "Whenever, Wherever"

=== Latin Grammy Awards (2000) ===
In 2000, the first Latin Grammy took place in the city of Los Angeles, California, where Shakira performed singing "Ojos Así" from her album Dónde Están los Ladrones? to continue promoting it. For the event, she wore a red bodysuit along with an Arabic dance belt. It is rated as one of the most memorable moments of the Latin Grammys to date. According to Billboard this ceremony was seen by a total of 7.5 million people on television.

=== Radio Music Awards (2001) ===
On 26 October 2001, Shakira appeared at the Aladdin Theater for the Radio Music Awards in New York City, performing her song "Whenever, wherever". The show was broadcast live on ABC.

=== VH1 Divas Las Vegas (2001) ===
In 2001, Shakira was part of the main participants for the VH1 Divas Las Vegas event: an honor concert for the VH1 Save The Music Foundation that was broadcast live from the MGM Grand Las Vegas on 23 May 2002. Performing her song "Underneath Your Clothes" from her album Laundry Service and a cover of Elvis Presley and a cover with Mary J. Blige of the song "Love is a Battlefield" by Pat Benatar.

=== MTV Video Music Awards (2002) ===
On 29 August 2002, Shakira performed "Objection (Tango)" at the 2002 MTV Video Music Awards in New York City. Instead of tango, the performance of the song was inspired by samba and featured a large number of percussionists on the stage. Shakira incorporated belly dancing moves in her choreography, and near the end of the performance, she fell backwards into the crowd and "was delivered back to the stage quickly enough not to miss a single line".

=== Party in the Park (2002) ===
During the promotion of Shakira's crossover album, she appeared at the summer concert "Party in the Park" in London invited by Prince Charles of England, where she sang a set list of "Whenever, Wherever", "Underneath Your Clothes" and "Objection (Tango) "

=== Grammys (2007) ===
Thanks to the success obtained with "Hips Don't Lie" in 2006, Shakira was invited to the Grammys in 2007, where she presented her song with rapper Wyclef Jean, Inspired by the aesthetics of Bollywood films, the performance features a cast of dancers dressed in metallic gold outfits and a dazzling illuminated archway that shines behind the performers. the singer rocked a midriff-baring gold two-piece ensemble while the rapper kept things comparatively casual, donning tan loungewear.

=== FIFA World Cup Closing Ceremony (2006) ===
On 9 June 2006, Shakira and Wyclef Jean performed "Hips Don't Lie" at the opening ceremony of the 2006 FIFA World Cup in Munich, and also a month later at the short ceremony preceding the final game in Berlin, to worldwide TV audiences of over 500 million and 700 million people.

=== Rock in Rio (2008) ===
On 4 July 2008, Shakira appeared at the Rock in Rio festival for the first time in front of an audience of 75,000 people dressed in a black vest and pants, opening the show with her song "Te Dejo Madrid" while touring her discography inviting some colleagues at the concert like Alejandro Sanz who joined her to sing "La Tortura"

=== American Music Awards (2009) ===
On 22 November 2009, Shakira wearing a mirrored black dress and "big" hair performed her song "Give It Up to Me", according to MTV the dancers took over the aisles of the auditorium, and they began to dance while Shakira sang while they flattered her performance saying it "set the tone for a night of girl power"

== Decade of 2010 ==
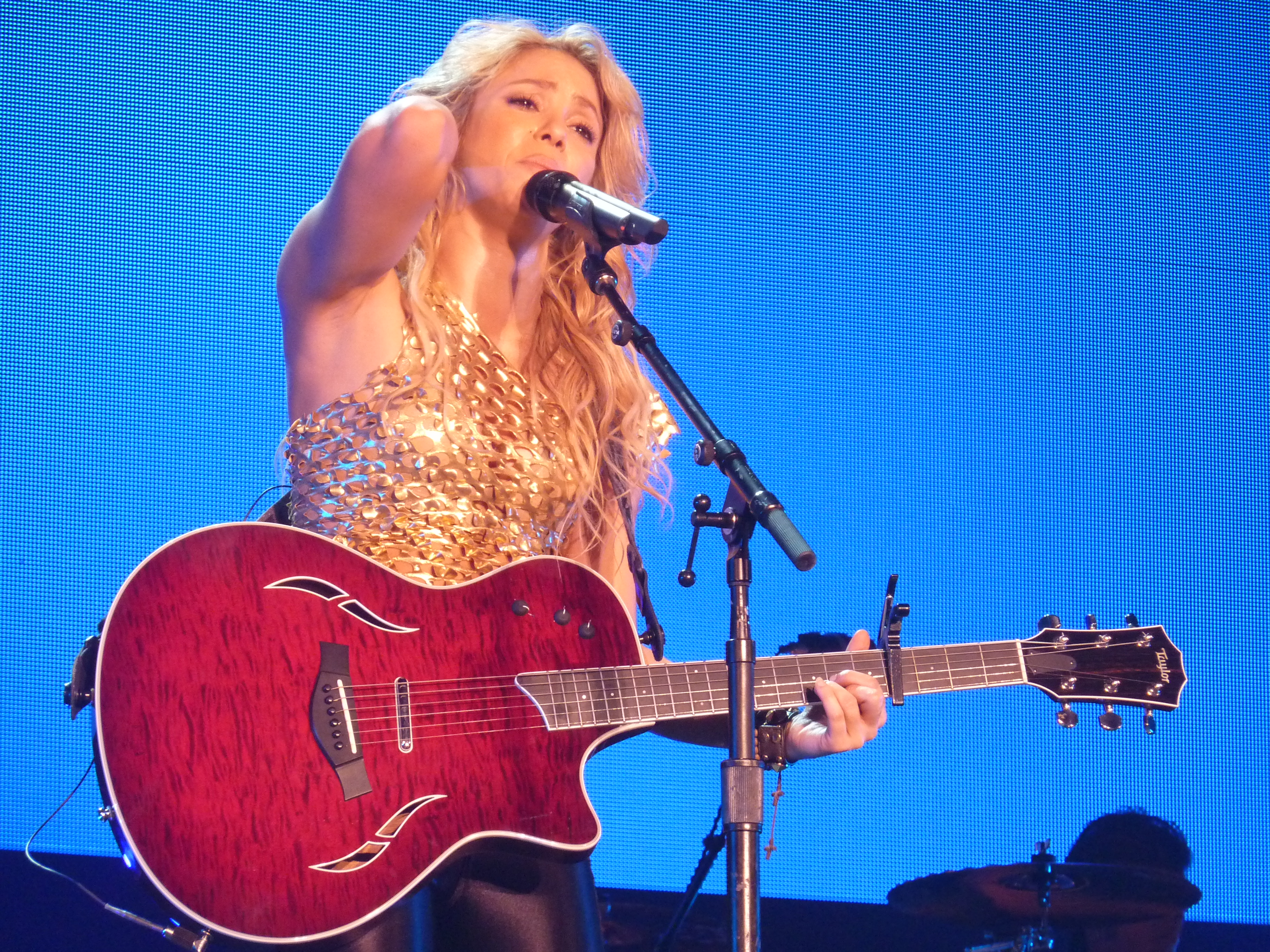
Shakira singing "Inevitable"

=== FIFA World Cup Opening Ceremony 2010 ===
Shakira was chosen by FIFA to make the official anthem of the 2010 World Cup held in South Africa. Shakira performed "Waka Waka (This Time for Africa)" at the 2010 FIFA World Cup opening ceremony on 10 June at the Orlando Stadium in Johannesburg, South Africa. The song was preceded by performances of her past singles "Hips Don't Lie" and "She Wolf". Freshlyground also appeared on the stage and Mahola sang her verse of the song. Numerous African dancers and musicians accompanied Shakira during the performance. For the performances, Shakira was dressed in a black and white zebra-print jumpsuit coupled with a silk-fringed skirt and bracelets made of brown leather and silver pearls. Her outfit was designed by Italian fashion designer Roberto Cavalli. Diane Coetzer from Billboard praised the performance and called it the "crowning moment" of the concert show. Although critical of Cavalli's costume, Los Angeles Times critic Ann Powers complimented Shakira's performance of the three songs and commended her incorporation of native dancers and musicians in the show, writing: "It was just a symbolic gesture, but a strong one in this evening-long review of pop music's journey from Africa to every corner of the earth, and back."

=== NBA All-Star Halftime Show (2010) ===
On 14 February 2010, Shakira was one of the artists that appeared at said event presenting "She Wolf" and "Give It Up to Me", the third single off the album, during the halftime of the 2010 NBA All-Star Game, Shakira emerged in a black military-style dress from a cage, and her dancers gyrated and tossed their hair wildly through Shakira's songs.

=== Rock in Rio (2010) ===
In 2010, Shakira performed before more than 85,000 people at the Rock in Rio festival held in Madrid, Spain, wearing a minimally decorated outfit that consisted of a gold bustier, black tuxedo pants, and boots, offering a repertoire for her hit songs from Her previous albums such as "Te Dejo Madrid", "Inevitable", "Whenever, Wherever", "Ciega, Sordomuda" among others.

=== Latin Grammy Awards (2011) ===
In 2011, she was awarded the "Person of the Year" award and recognition, being the youngest artist to receive that award and the second woman after Gloria Estefan, Shakira received a tribute from various artists singing her previous songs such as "Blind, Sordomuda " or "Objection (Tango)" also appeared later singing her song "Antes de las Seis" from her album "Sale el Sol" to promote it.

=== Glastonbury (2010) ===
In 2010, Shakira performed a show at a music festival in the UK Glastonbury presenting hits from her repertoire such as: "Hips Don't Lie", "Inevitable", "She Wolf", "Waka Waka", "Underneath Your Clothes", "Whenever, Wherever", among others. For the presentation Shakira wore tight black pants and a sleeveless shirt, for the Ojos Así segment she used her classic Belly Dance belt. It was well received by critics where The Guardian gave it 4 stars out of 5.

=== New Year China (2011) ===
For the new year in China, the company Jiangsu Satellite TV confirmed that Shakira would join to celebrate the new year in the Asian country specifically in the city of Nankín, Shakira made a brief appearance singing her classics: Hips Don't Lie, Waka Waka and Ojos Así.

=== FIFA Women's U-17 World Cup (2012) ===
On 13 October 2012, Shakira performed at the Women's Soccer U-17 World Cup's closing ceremony, held in Baku, Azerbaijan. Shakira wore leather pants and knee-high boots with a shiny long black top and a short-sleeved jacket. Shakira gave a presentation of her songs "Loca" and "Waka Waka" from her album "Sale el Sol".

=== FIFA World Cup Closing Ceremony (2014) ===
In 2014, Shakira was in charge of closing the FIFA World Cup Brazil due to the poor reception of Jlo and Pitbull's song "We Are One", Shakira wore a red dress during the presentation with the Brazilian singer Carlinhos Brown at the stadium Maracana.

=== Global Citizen Festival (2017) ===
In 2017, Shakira made an appearance at the Global Citizen Festival held in Hamburg, Germany. She appeared with the vocalist of the band Coldplay, Chris Martin, presenting a cover of "Yellow", along with the hits "Chantaje" and "Me Enamoré" belonging to the album " El Dorado" by Shakira, the show was widely acclaimed by both the public and some journalists.

=== Davis Cup (2019) ===
In 2019, Shakira performed at the Davis Cup final in Spain, presenting her songs "She Wolf", a remix of Camilo's "Tutu" and "Lalala" from her 2014 self-titled album. For the event, Shakira wore a Navy blue bodysuit with diamonds that was decorated with fringes on a kind of skirt with tall black boots.

== Decade of 2020 ==
=== Super Bowl LIV Halftime Show (2020) ===
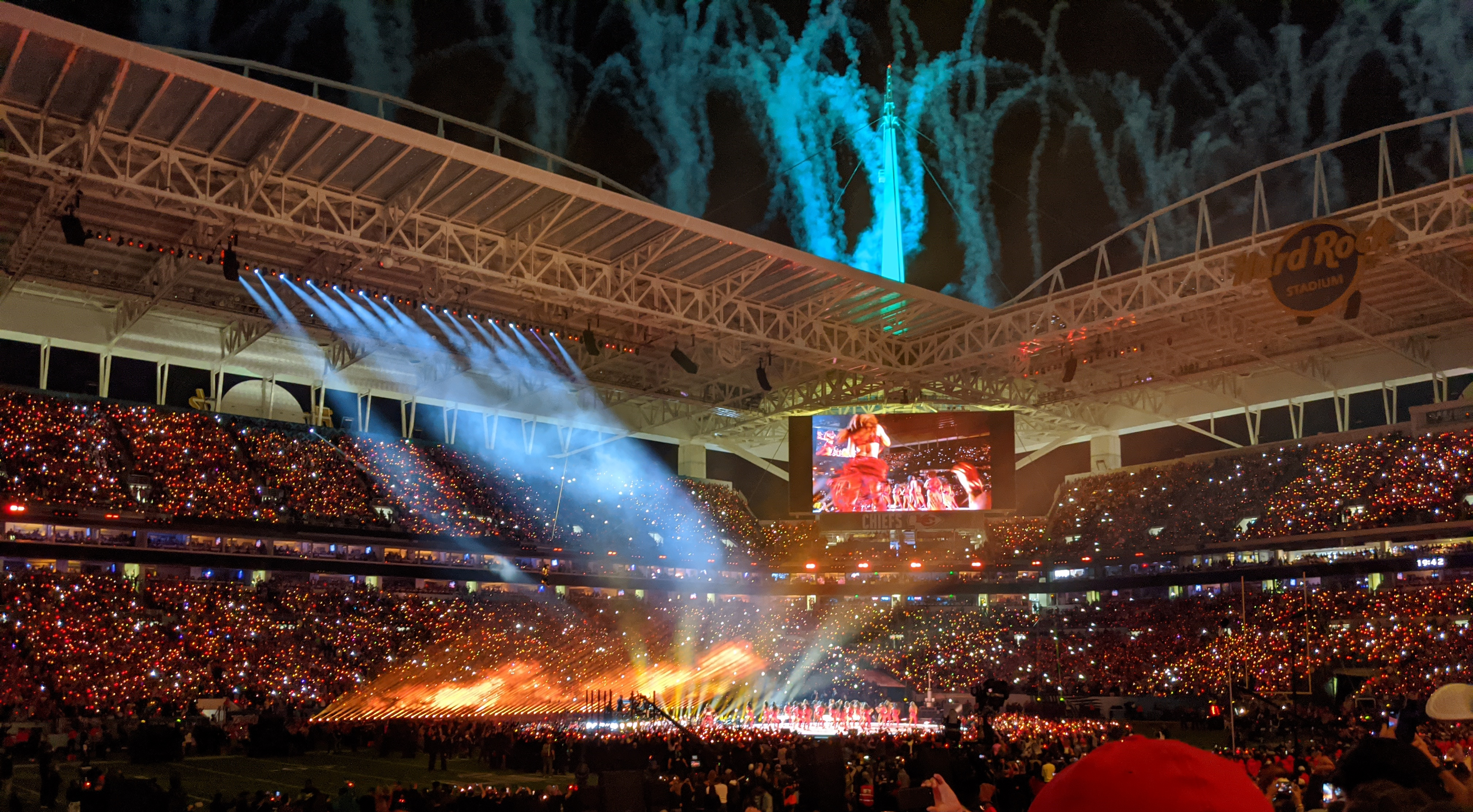
Shakira performing in the Super Bowl Halftime Show LIV

At the end of the year 2019, the NFL made the official announcement that Shakira would be one of two artists to headline the Super Bowl LVI halftime show alongside Jennifer Lopez at Hard Rock Stadium in Miami, Florida on 2 February 2020. Roc Nation served as producers and creative directors of the show; their producers included Dan Parise. Ricky Kirshner served as the show's executive producer and Hamish Hamilton served as director. Jaquel Knight, Nadine Eliya, and Maite Marcos were the creative directors and choreographers of Shakira's half. In mid-January, the producers announced they would recruit approximately 600 field team members to assist with the performance. Ultimately, 670 team field members were enlisted. One of the main managers to perform the choreography of the champeta that Shakira danced during the Super Bowl Halftime Show was Liz Dany.

The lighting equipment used a total of 113 Ayrton Perseo equipment and 60 units of Claypaky's Xtylos laser source beam, as well as 12 Sharpy moving heads. For the control, there was a GrandMA2 console from MA Lighting. Among the more than 700 luminaires that made up this design, 113 units of Ayrton's Perseus were installed, the new model of the French brand catalogued with IP65. Placed on the catwalk along which the artists moved, they provided background lighting creating aerial effects.

Reviewer Chris Willman of Variety wrote "Costumers deserve almost as much credit as the choreographers here." Shakira's set had three costume changes; each piece was custom-made by Norwegian designer Peter Dundas. Her first was a red, cropped bustier with a cross-straps top that was paired with a removable corset and fringed skirt, each of which were covered with 123,000 Swarovski crystals in three shades of red. This was paired with crystal-accented leather cuffs and knee-high boots that were made by the designer Daniel Jacob. The boots were covered with 30,000 Swarovski crystals and took ten days to create. Shakira then made a mid-performance costume change to reveal a fringed, feathered skirt previously hidden under a sarong. Her final costume was an entirely new ensemble consisting of a bomber jacket covered in gold sequin embroidery and gold-and-white Swarovski crystals on a matching gold sequin crop top, which she wore with matching high-waisted hot pants and Dundas-customized Adidas Superstar sneakers. During the show, Shakira presented a setlist of her entire career, interpreting her most emblematic songs from the 90s, 2000s and 2010s. Starting with She Wolf, which contained excerpts from her song "Lalala (Brazil 2014)" to later move on to "Empire" from her self-titled album. which contained parts of her song "Inevitable" and Led Zeppelin's "Kashmir" immediately to switch to 1998's "Ojos Así" and transition into "Whenever, Wherever" from her album "Laundry Service", Bad Bunny joined her to sing Cardi B's "I Like It" which contained elements of "En Barranquila me quedo" to move into a mashup between "Chantaje (Versión Salsa)" and "Callaíta" ending her first part with "Hips Don' t Lie". After Jlo's performance Shakira returned to the stage to perform "Waka Waka" (which contained excerpts from "Champeta") ending the show with Jlon dancing an excerpt from "Aguianile".

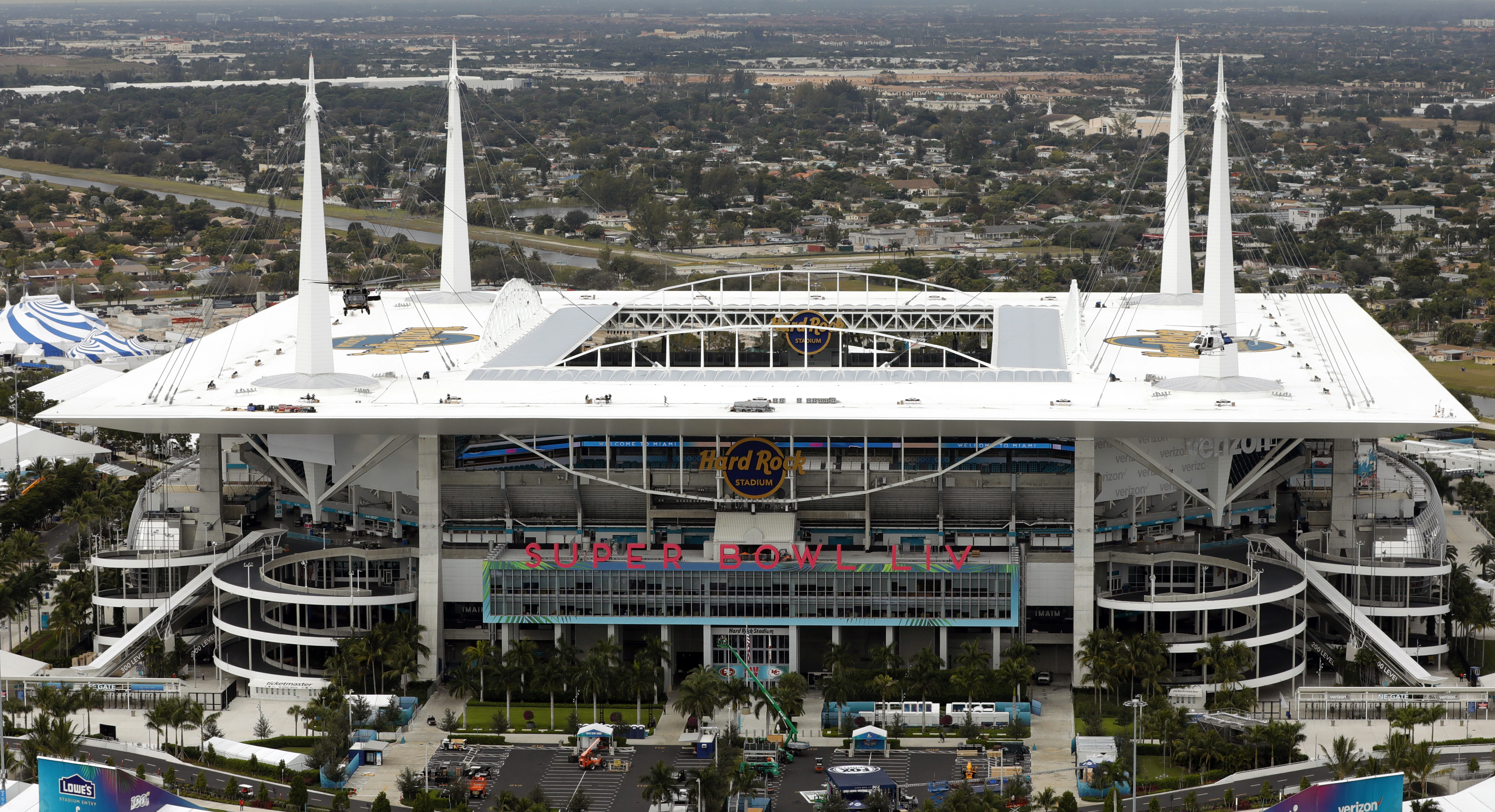
Hard Rock Stadium

The show generated great attention from television and radio media due to the "great erotic content" by both Shakira and Jlo in their presentations. However, the performance was a great success with an increase of 4% in the audience compared to previous years, on social networks such as Twitter the name Shakira became a world trend, surpassing the Super Bowl itself and Shakira ended up being the most popular female artist. searched on Google from the year 2020. Although like other artists Shakira was not paid for her performance, Shakira received a large increase in average concert revenue in the Super Bowl year. According to sites like Rolling Stone, Vulture, NFL and more, this show is considered among the best Halftime Shows in Super Bowl history. The show came second to only Queen's 1985 Live Aid performance as the world's most popular live performance in history.

Jon Pareles of The New York Times lauded the performance, calling it an improvement over the previous year's halftime. He called the show "a no-nonsense affirmation of Latin pride and cultural diversity in a political climate where immigrants and American Latinos have been widely demonized", called Shakira and Lopez "Latina superwomen, smiling pop conquistadoras backed by phalanxes of dancers", and calling the show "euphoria with a purpose". David Bauder of the Associated Press wrote Lopez and Shakira "infused the Super Bowl halftime show with an exuberance and joy that celebrated their Latina heritage". He also wrote, "Their breathless athleticism matched that of the football players waiting in the locker room" but called J Balvin's and Bad Bunny's guest appearances "superfluous". Greg Kot of the Chicago Tribune wrote, "Prince's 2007 Super Bowl performance is still king of halftime, but Shakira and J Lo were certainly the most undeniable performance since then". Bobby Olivier of NJ.com described the halftime show as "high-octane, relentless Latin pop fun", adding it was "a blazing performance that should challenge Lady Gaga and Beyoncé as some of the best halftime sets of the past decade or so".

== Other concerts ==
=== TV appearances ===
Fecha	Evento	Country	Canción(es) interpretada(s)	Ref.
1987	Vivan los niños	Mexico	«El vendedor» (Cover)	
1991	"Magia" LP Release Party	Colombia	«Sueños» · «Magia» · «Lejos de tu amor» · «Esta noche voy contigo»	
1991	Sábados Felices	Colombia	«Esta Noche Voy Contigo»	
1993	El Show de la estrellas	Colombia	«Brujería» · «Eres» · «Controlas mi destino» · «Tú serás la historia de mi vida»	
1996	Un Nuevo Día	Mexico	«Se quiere, se mata» · «Antología»	
1996	Otro Rollo	Mexico	«Estoy Aquí» · «¿Dónde Estas Corazón?»	
1997	Domingo Legal	Brazil	«Estoy Aquí» · «¿Dónde Estas Corazón?» · «Pies Descalzos» · «Se quiere, se mata»	
1997	Risas de América	Peru	«Ciega, Sordomuda»	
1998	Gems	United States	«Ciega, Sordomuda» · «Ojos Así»	
1998	Programa Livre	Brazil	«Estoy Aquí» · «¿Dónde Estas Corazóz?»	
1998	Super Sabado Sensacional	Venezuela	«Ciega, Sordomuda» · «Inevitable» · «Tú»	
1998	Con T de tarde	Spain	«Ciega, Sordomuda»	
1999	Al Fin de la Semana	El Salvador	«Ciega, Sordomuda» · «Inevitable» · «Tú»	
1999	Laura en América	Peru	«Ciega, Sordomuda»	
2001	Radio Music Si	Spain	«Whenever, Wherever» · «Te Dejo Madrid»	
2001	The Rosie O'Donnell Show	United States	«Whenever, Wherever»	
2001	The Tonight Show	United States	«Whenever, Wherever»	
2002	Viva Interaktiv	Germany	«Whenever, Wherever»	
2002	Top of the Pops	United Kingdom	«Whenever, Wherever» · «Objection (Tango)»	
2002	Otro Rollo	Mexico	«Que Me Quedes Tú» · «Te Dejo Madrid»	
2002	Wetten Dass	Germany	«Whenever, Wherever» · «Objection (Tango)»	
2002	Live with Regis & Kelly	United States	«Whenever, Wherever» · «Underneath Your Clothes»	
2002	Music Station	Japan	«Whenever, Wherever»	
2002	What U Want	Australia	«Whenever, Wherever» · «Underneath Your Clothes»	
2002	Musique Plus	Canada	«Whenever, Wherever» · «Underneath Your Clothes» · «Fool»	
2002	Domingo Legal	Brazil	«Pies Descalzos» · «Whenever, Wherever» · «Underneath Your Clothes»	
2002	Uno Di Noi	Italy	«Objection (Tango)»	
2005	Otro Rollo	Mexico	«La Tortura» · «No» · «La Pared»	
2005	Good Morning America	United States	«Don't Bother» · «Illegal»	
2006	Live with Regis & Kelly	United States	«Hips Don't Lie»	
2020	The Disney Family Singalong: Volume II	Spain	«Try Everything»	
2020	Global Goal: Unite for Our Future	Spain	«Sale el Sol»	

== List of reviews ==
Below is a table with some examples of the lists that the media collect or survey about the performances of various activities, which have included many performed by Shakira.

Año	Lista	Compañía	Tipo	Posición/Puntaje	Presentación	Ref(s)
2023	Ranking the Best Super Bowl Halftime Shows of All Time	Fox Sports	Ranking (Charlotte Wilder)	N° 3	Shakira and Jennifer Lopez Halftime Show (2020)	
2023	The 10 Best Super Bowl Halftime Shows	Independent	Ranking (Independent Staff)	N° 3	Shakira and Jennifer Lopez Halftime Show (2020)	
2023	Los 12 mejores shows de medio tiempo del Super Bowl	Shock (Magazine)	Ranking (Shock Staff)	N° 1	Shakira and Jennifer Lopez Halftime Show (2020)	
2022	Every Super Bowl Halftime Show, Ranked From Worst to Best	Rolling Stone	Ranking (Rob Sheffield)	N° 6	Shakira and Jennifer Lopez Halftime Show (2020)	
2022	Every Super Bowl Halftime Show Since 1993, Ranked	Vulture	Ranking (Bryan Moylan)	N° 12	Jennifer Lopez and Shakira Halftime Show (2020)	
2021	Top 10 Iconic Shows in MTV	MTV	Ranking (MTV Staff)	N° 10	Shakira singing "Hips Don't Lie" at the Vmas (2006)	
2018	The five best performances at the World Cup opening ceremony	Oxígeno	Ranking (Oxígeno Staff)	N° 1	Shakira opening World Cup 2010	
2017	The 6 best presentations by Colombians at the Latin Grammys	Pulzo	Ranking (Pulzo Staff)	N° 1	Shakira "Ojos Así" Latin Grammys 2000	
2014	5 unforgettable World Cup openings	El Universo	List (El Universo Staff)	N° 1	Shakira opening World Cup 2010	
2013	The five most remembered Latin Grammy presentations	America	Ranking (America Noticias Staff)	N° 3	Shakira y Alejandro Sanz "La Tortura" (2006)	

== Gallery ==
=== Performances ===
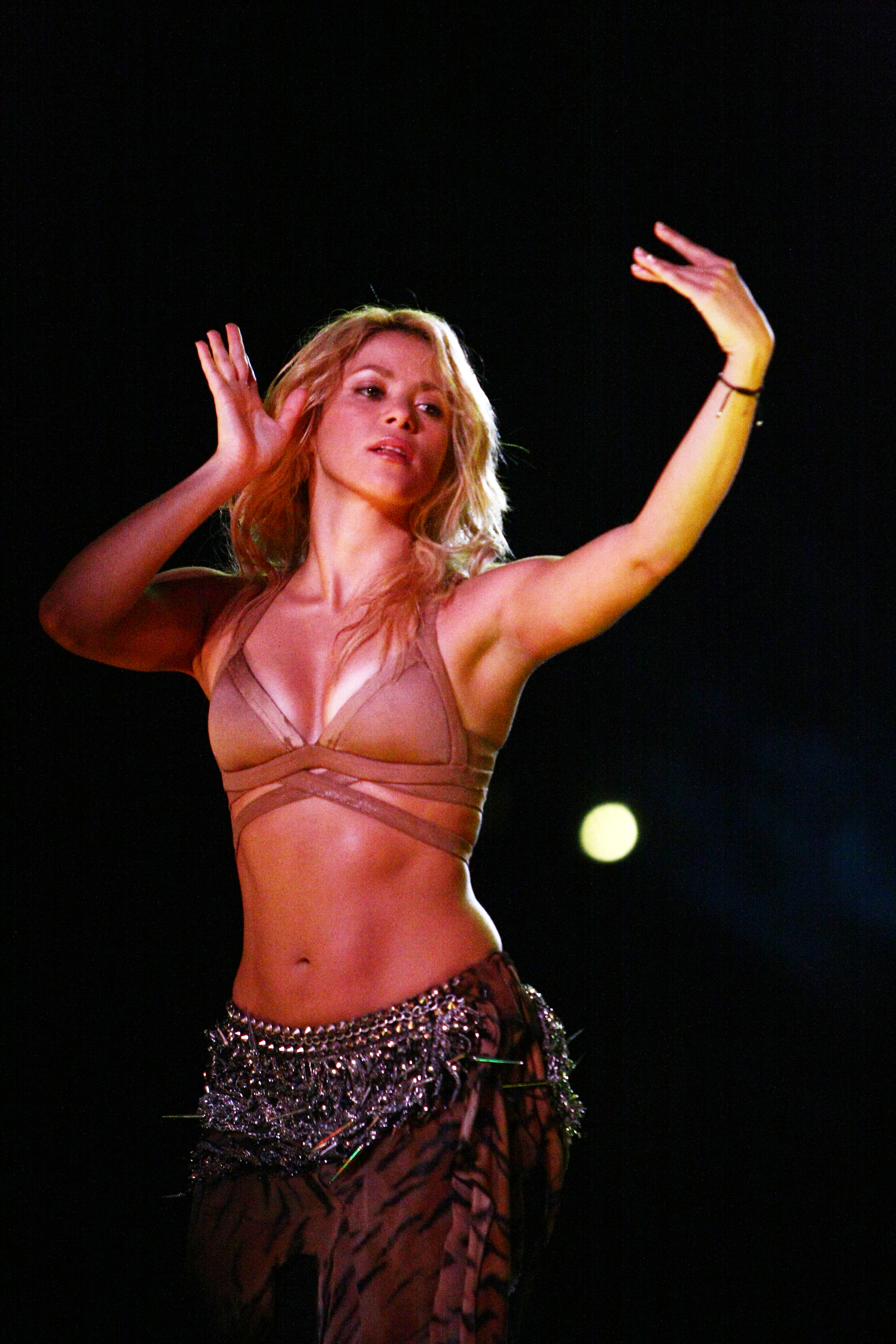

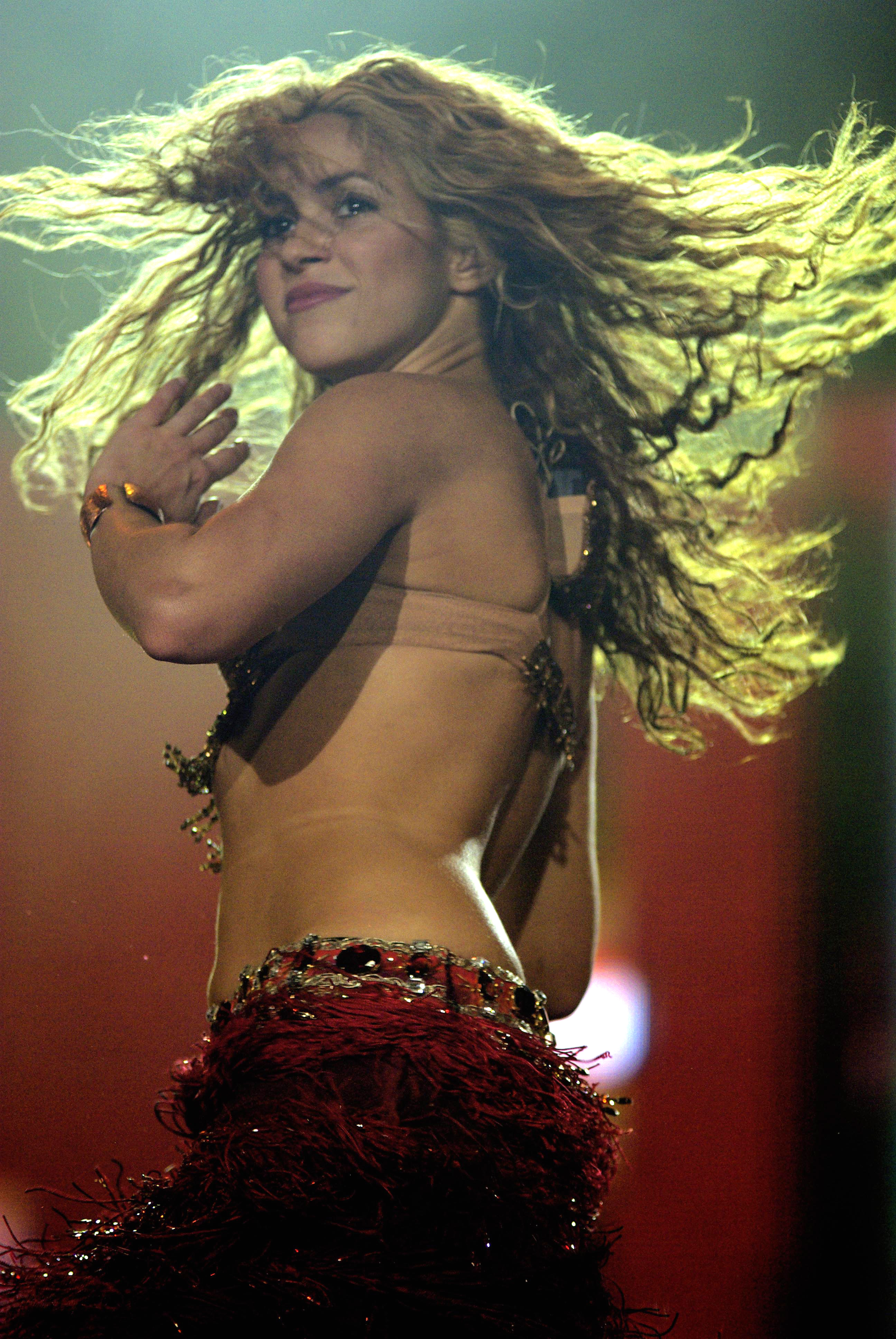

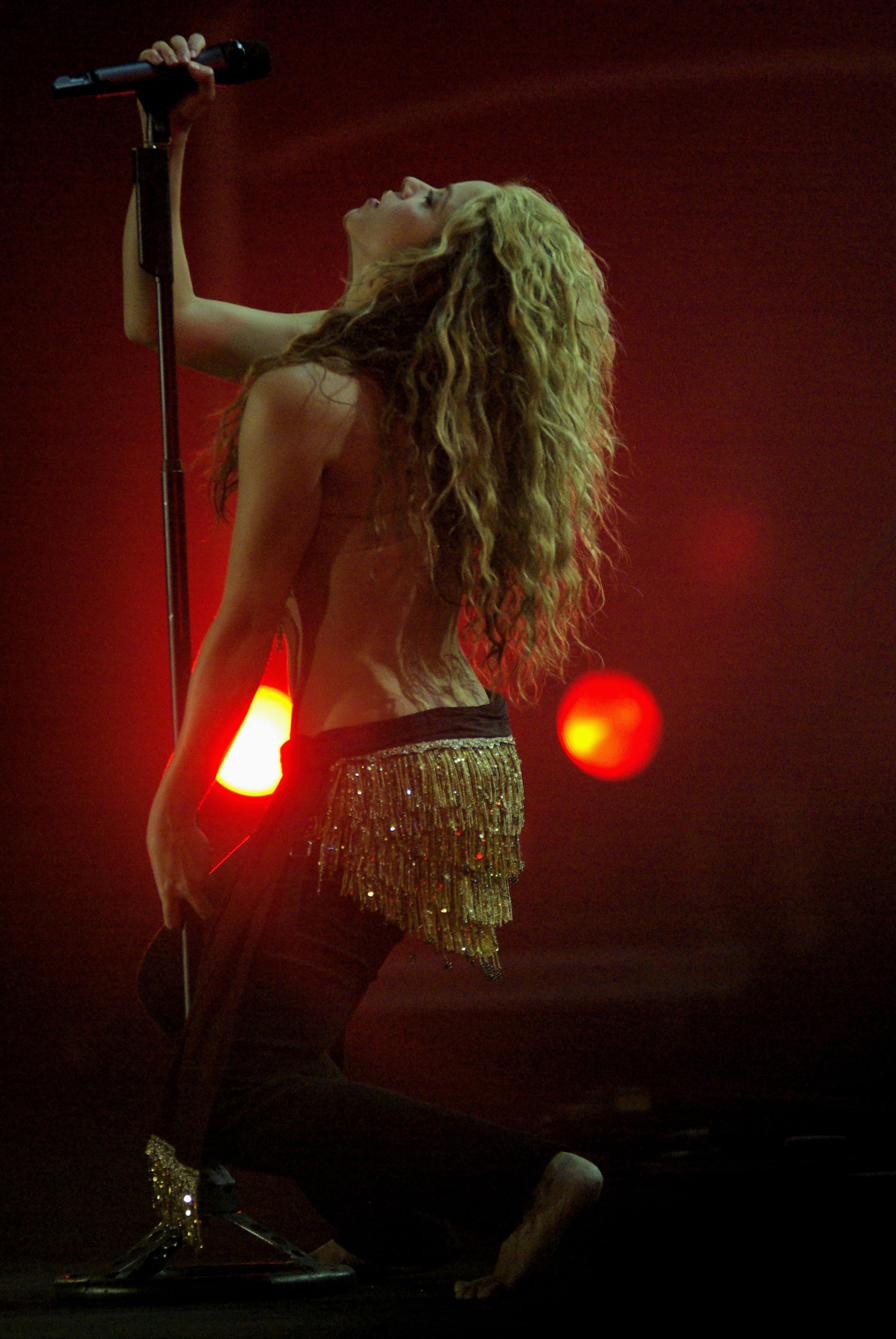

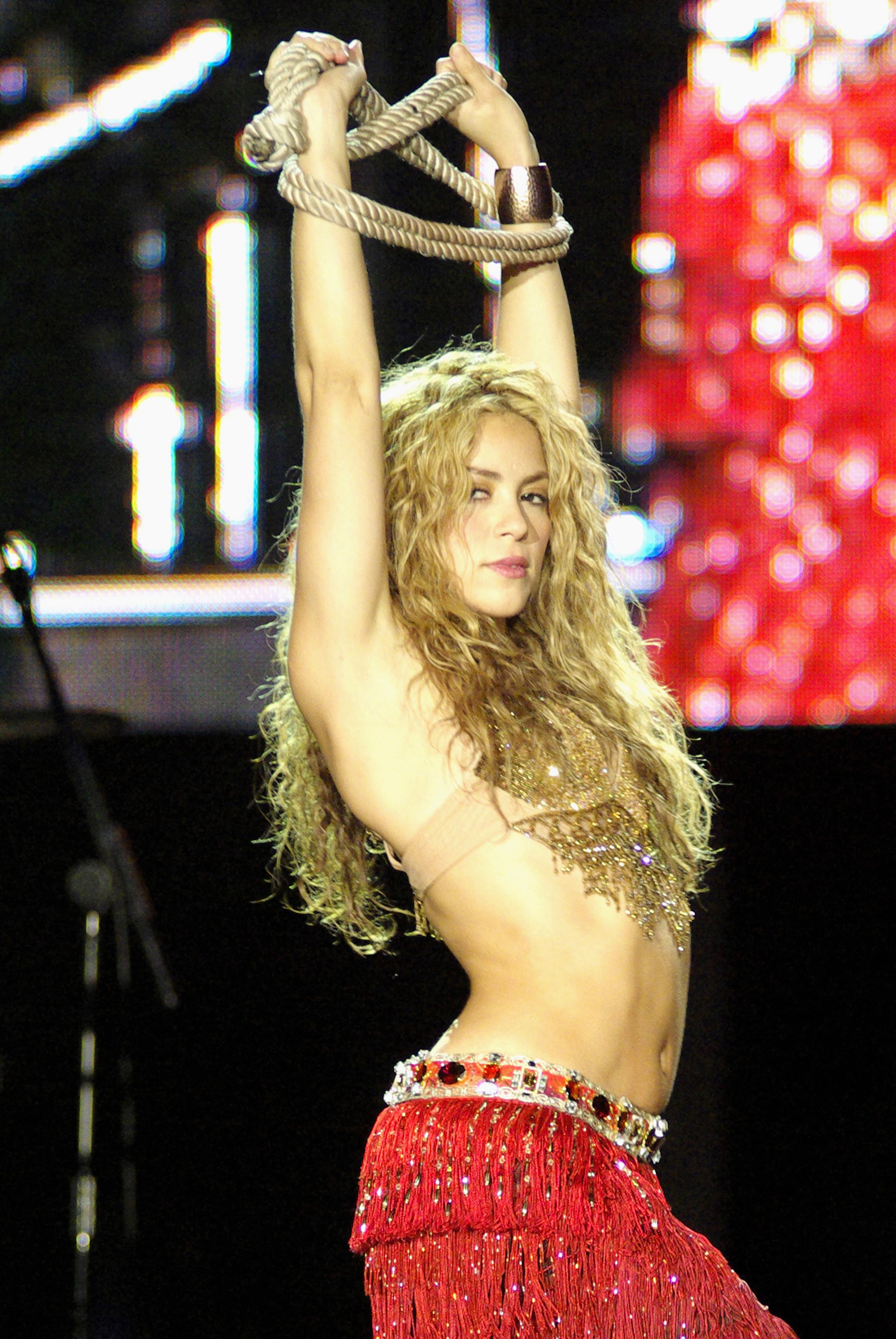

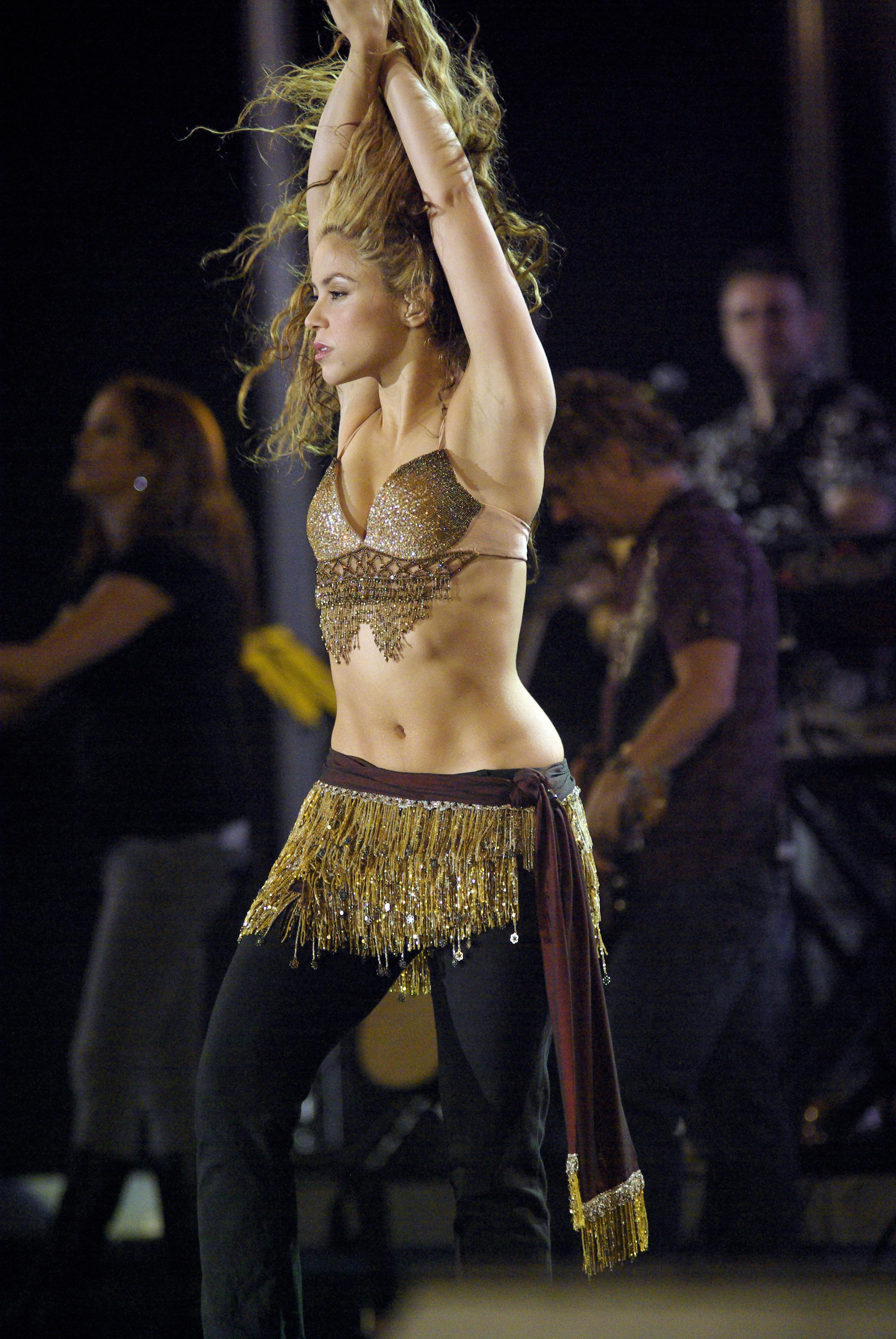

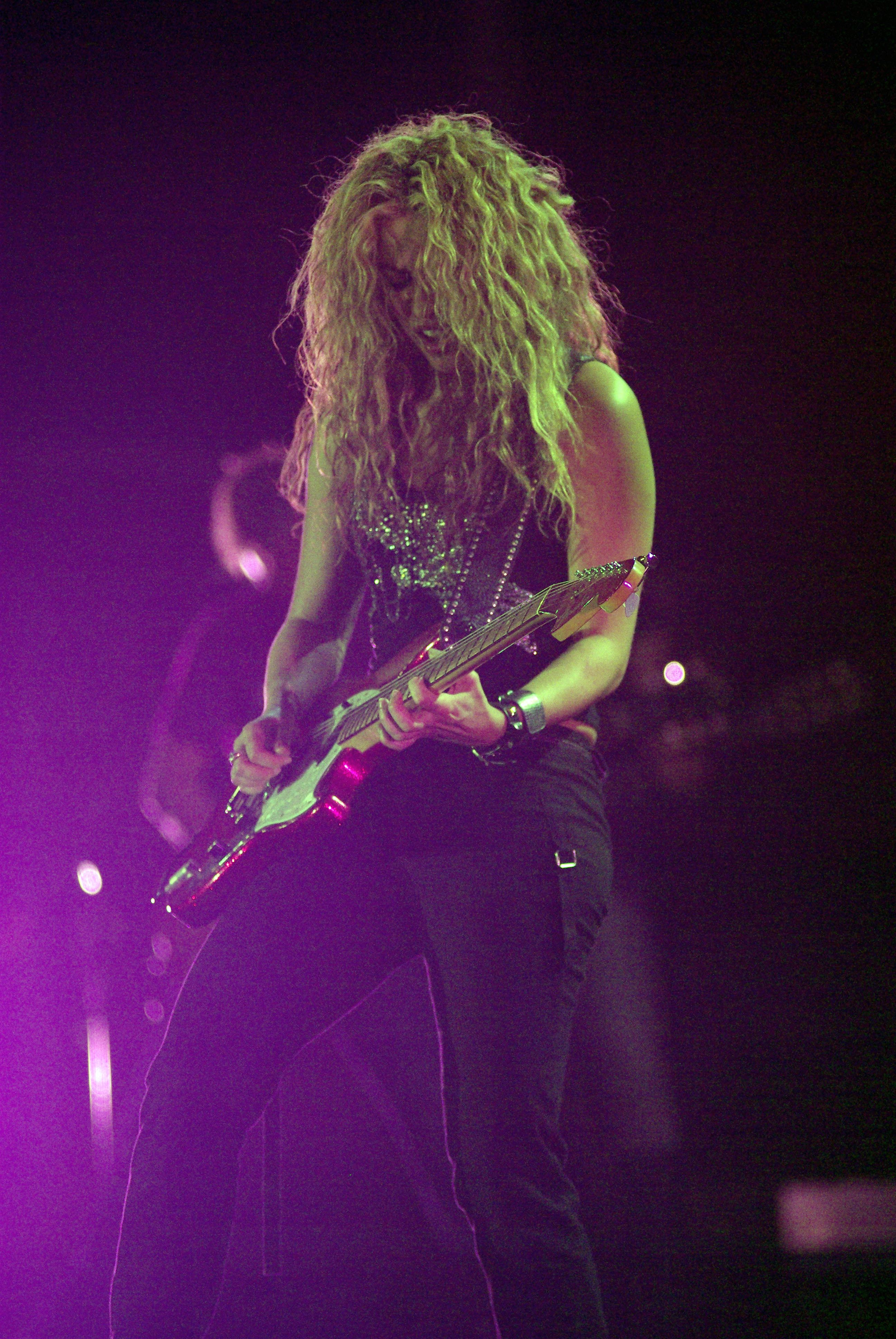

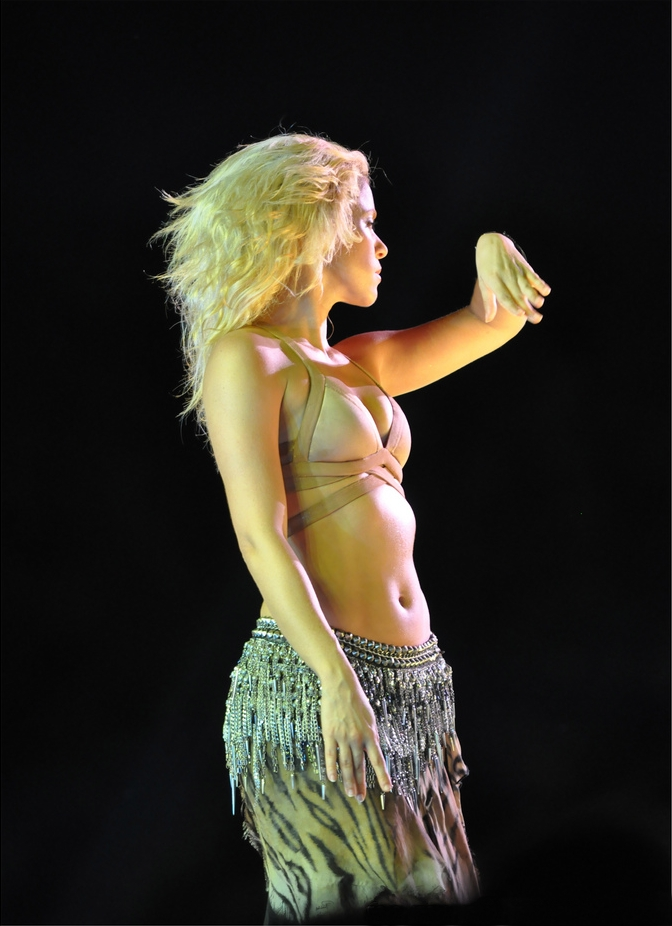

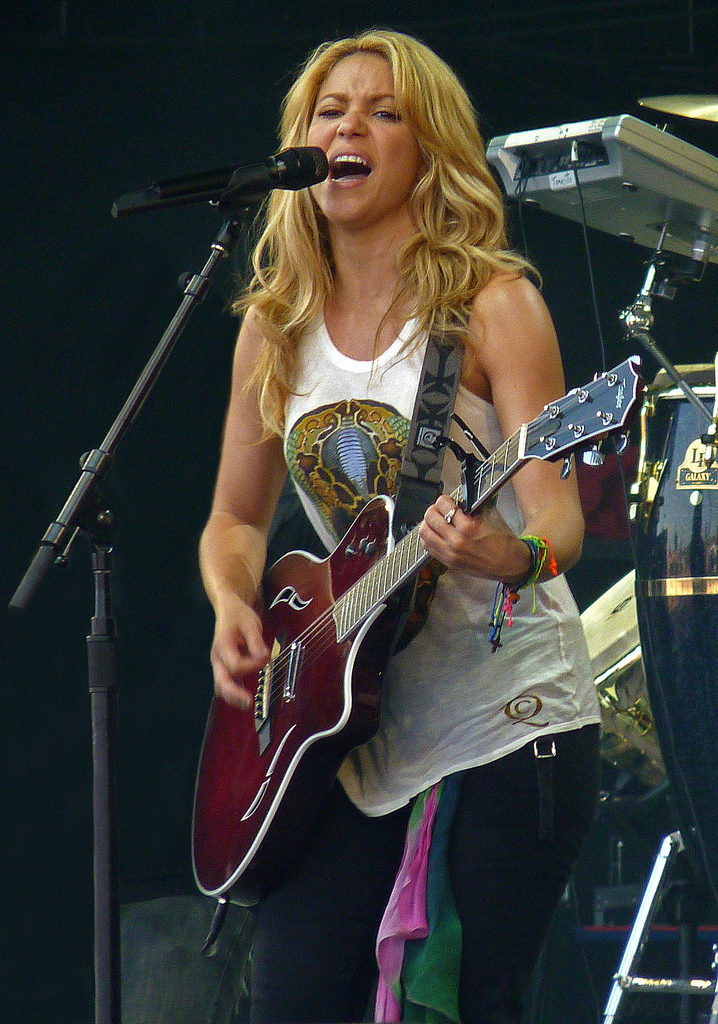

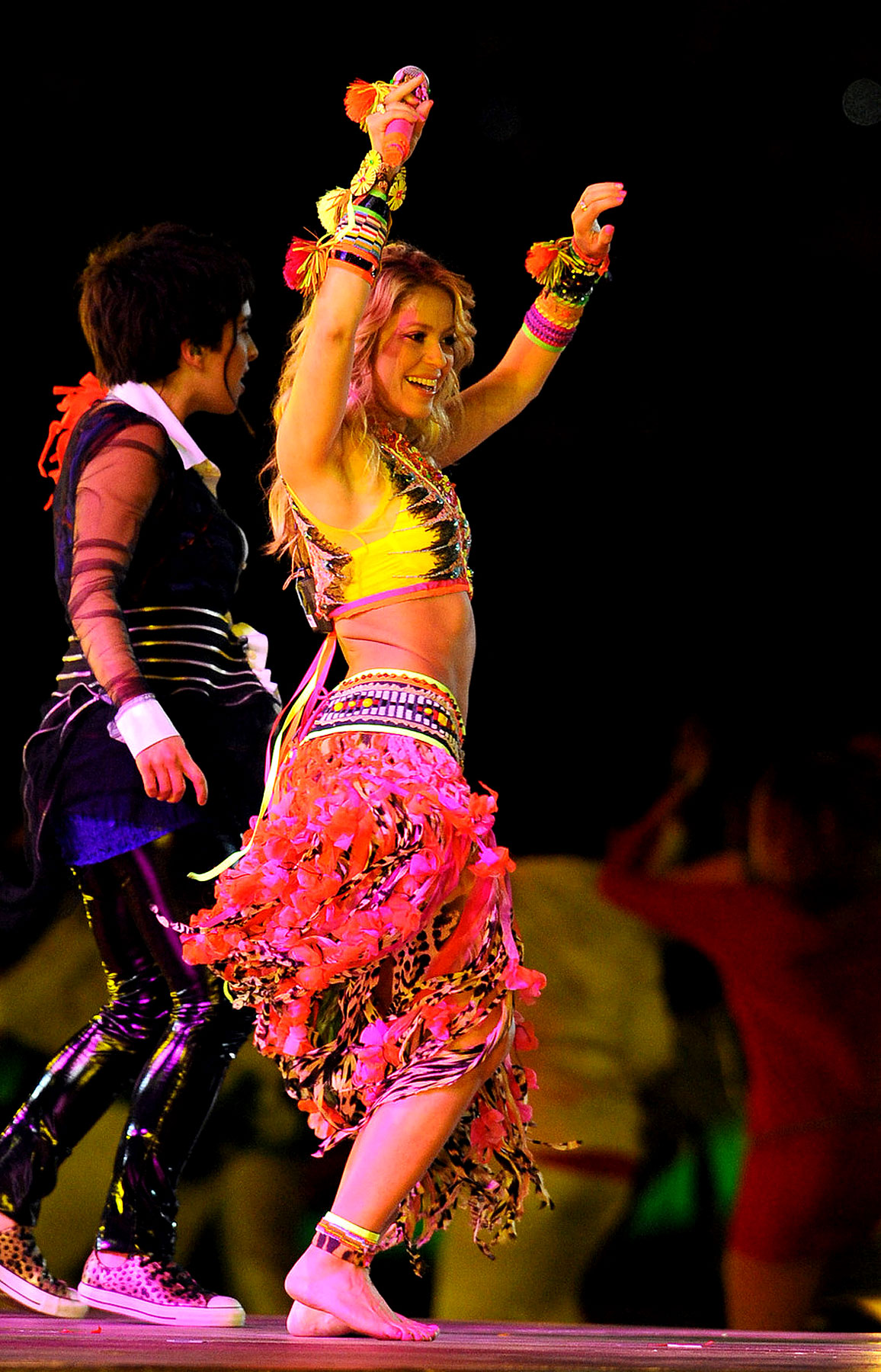

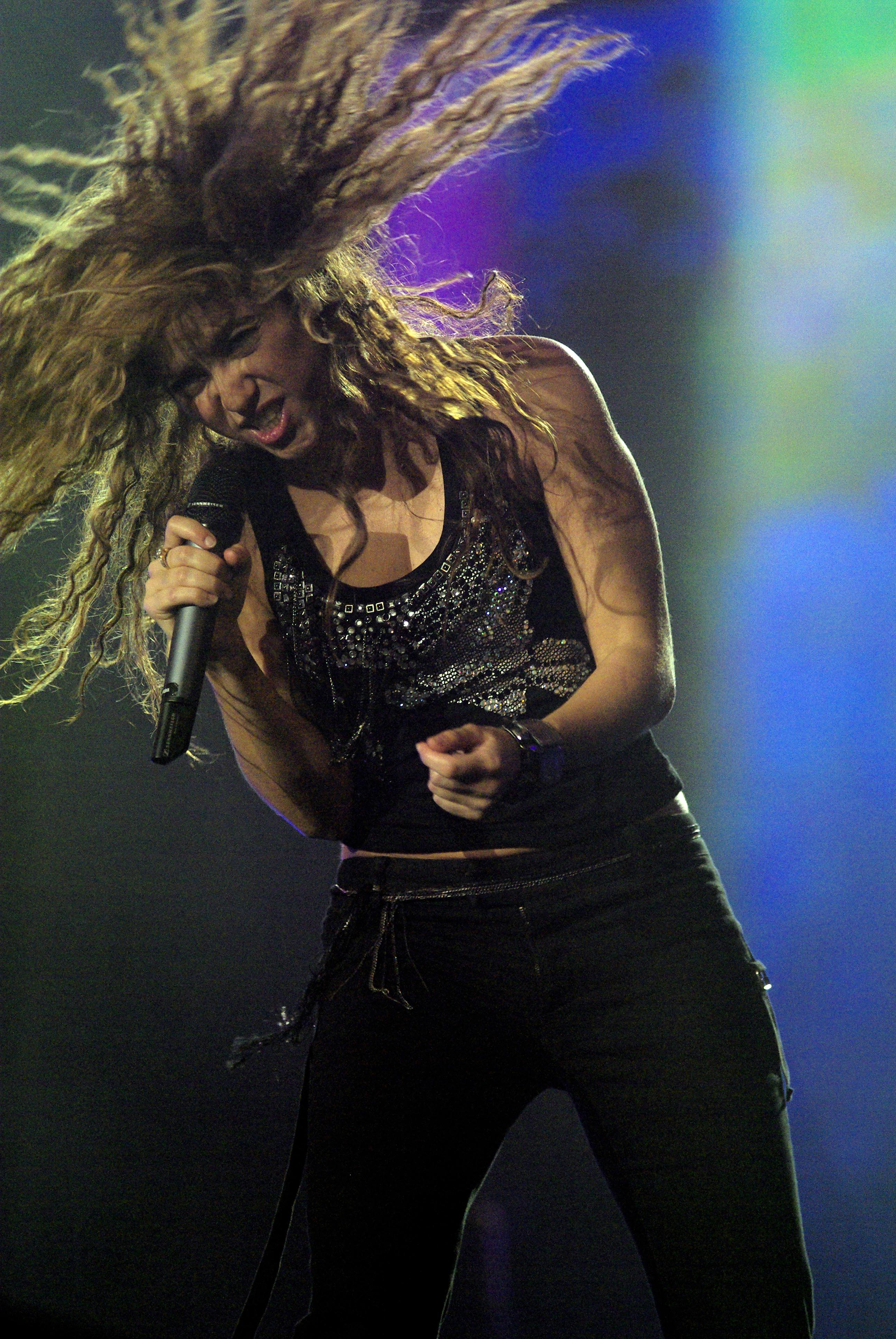

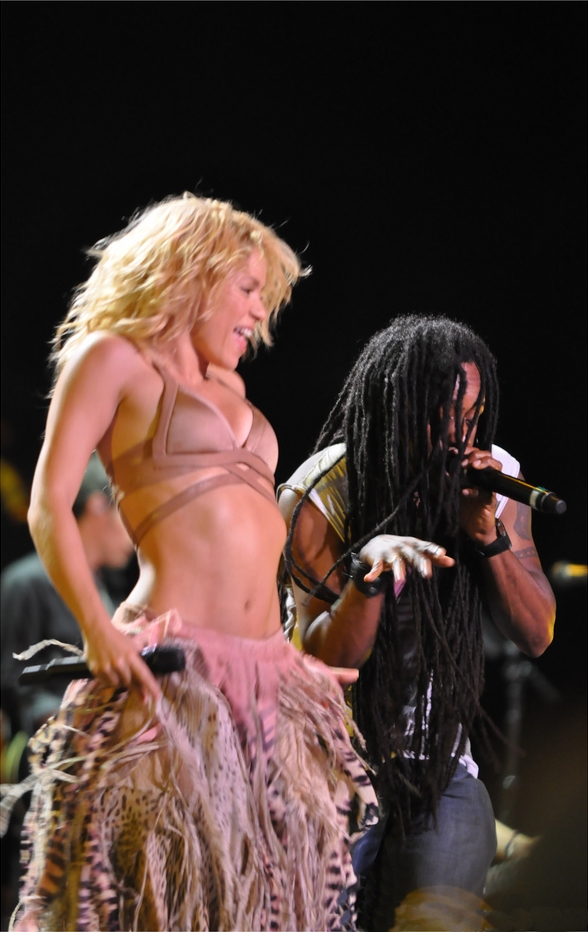

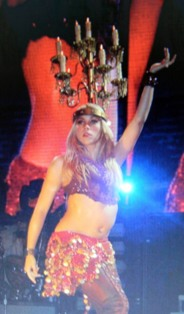

=== Audience ===
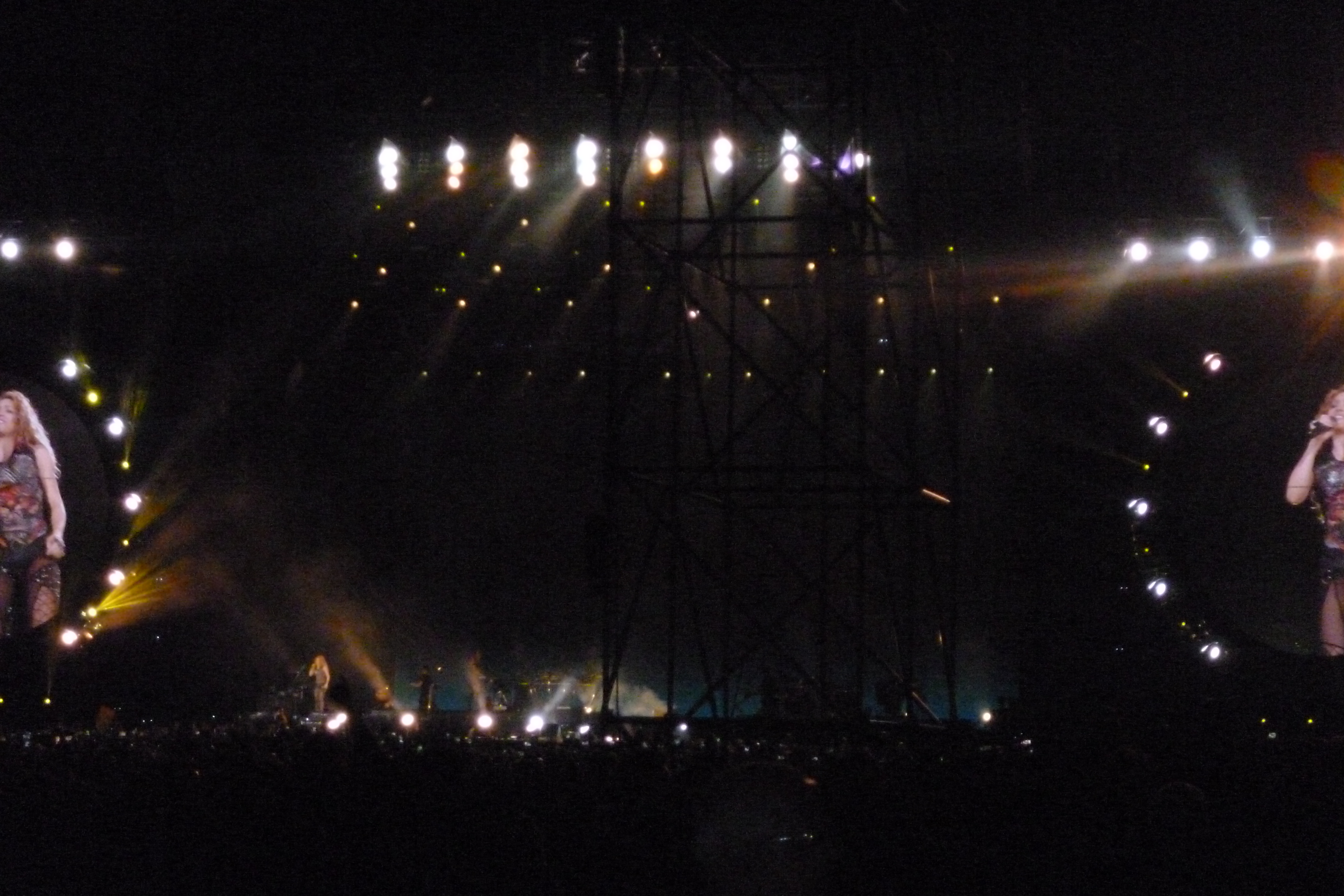
Shakira fans during her concert "El Dorado World Tour" in 2018

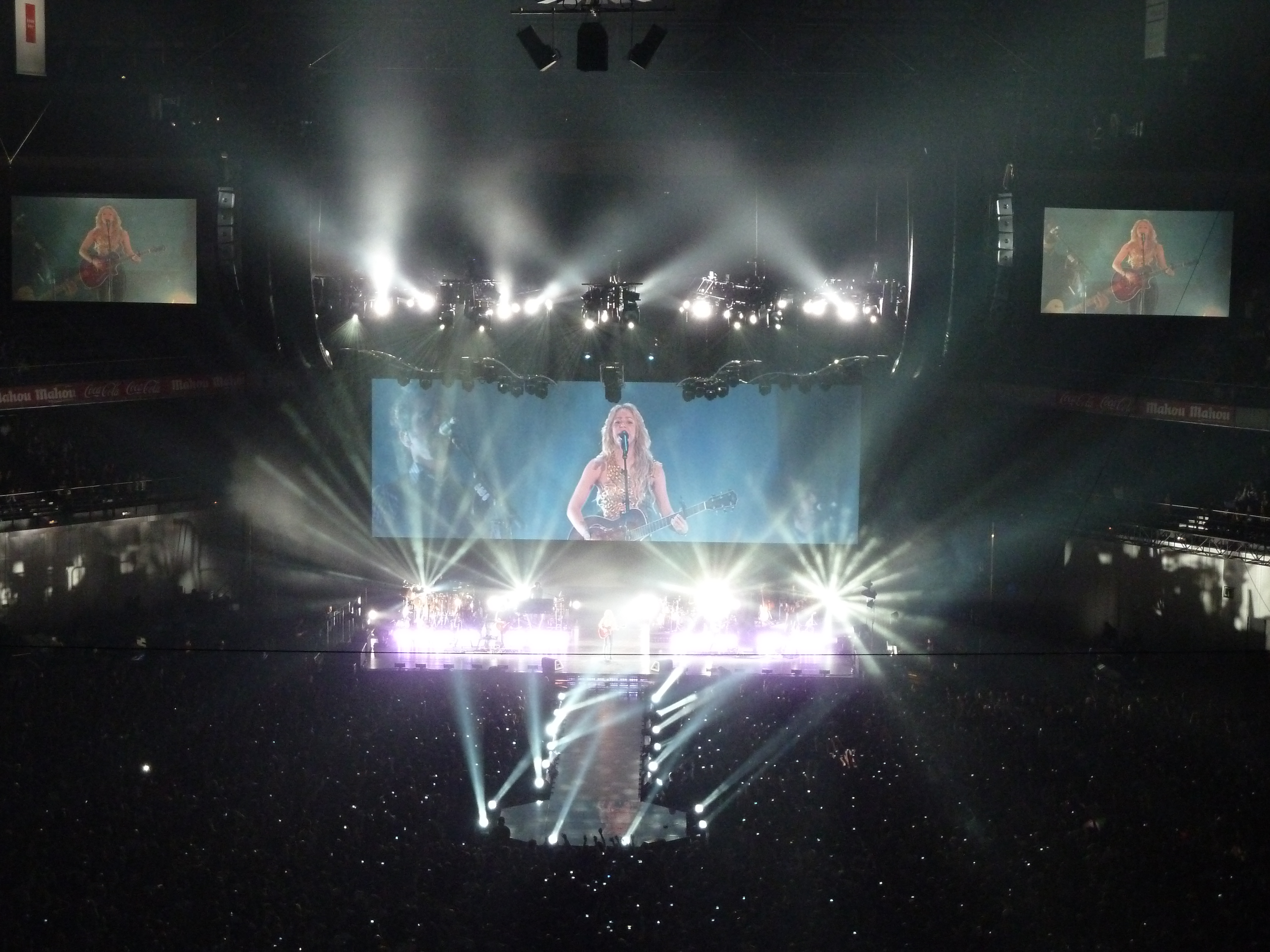
Fans present during "The Sun Comes Out World Tour" concert in 2011

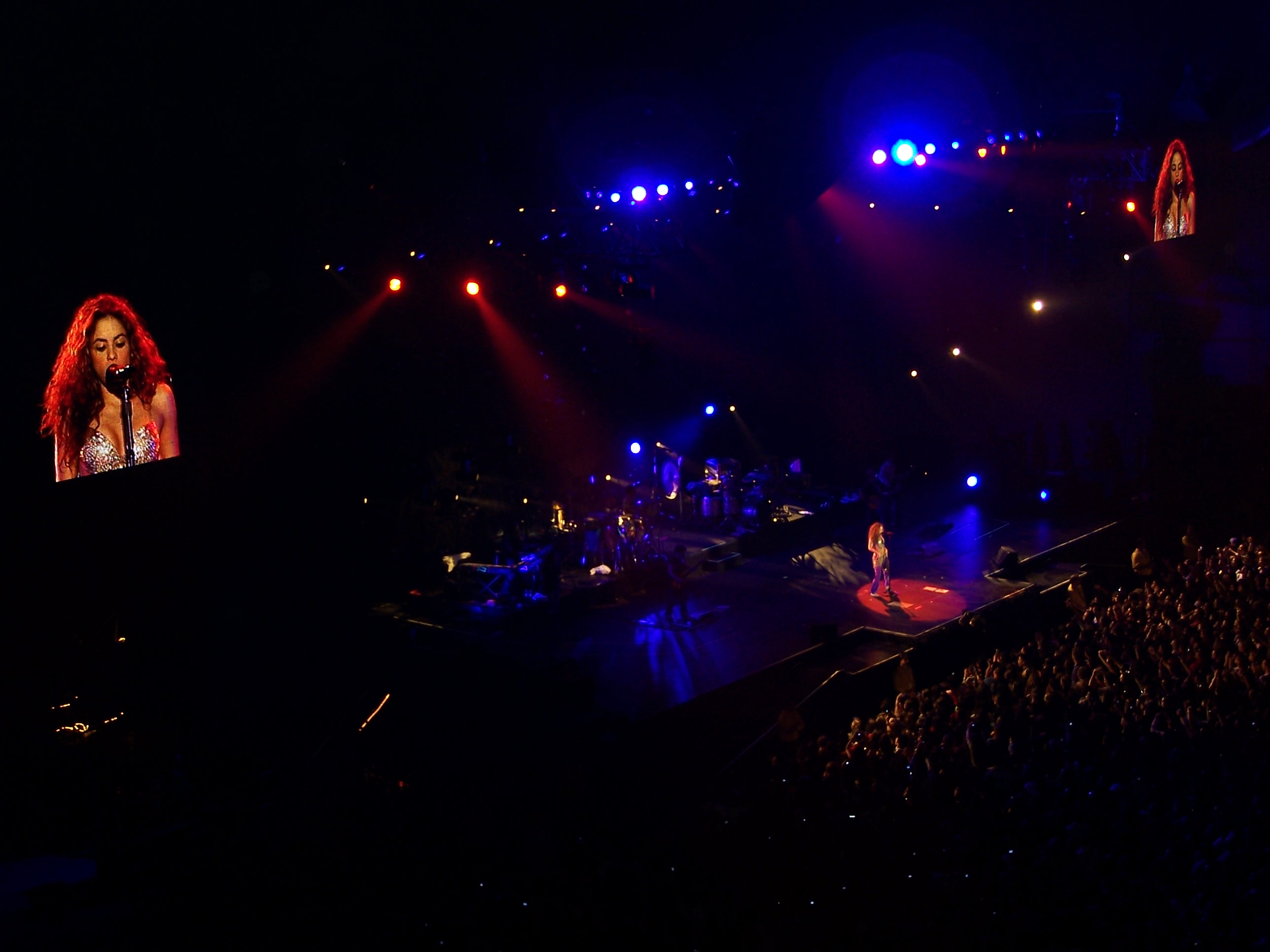
During the 2007 "Oral Fixation World Tour" concert Shakira singing along with her fans

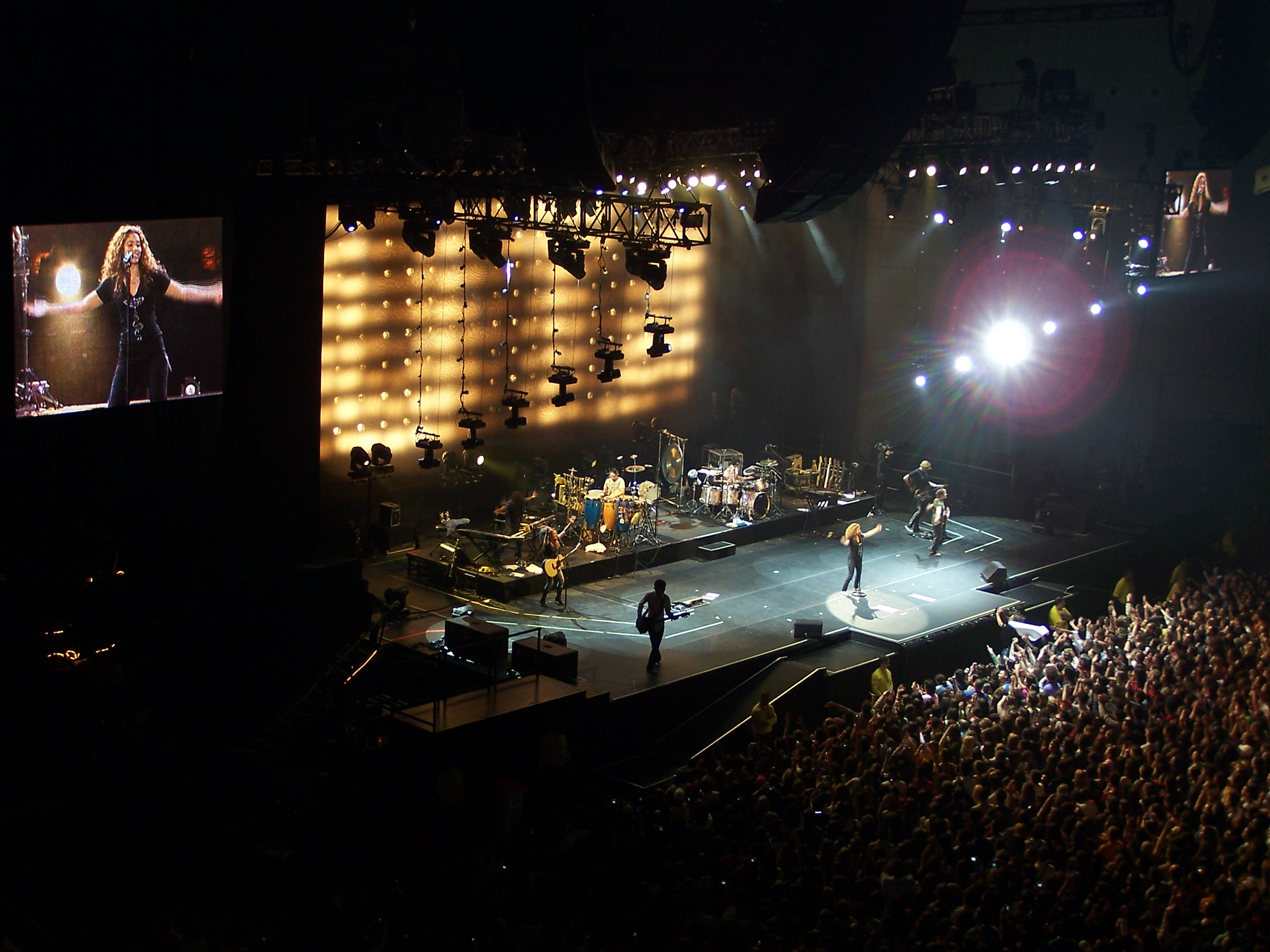
Shakira doing a performance of her song while her fans sing with her

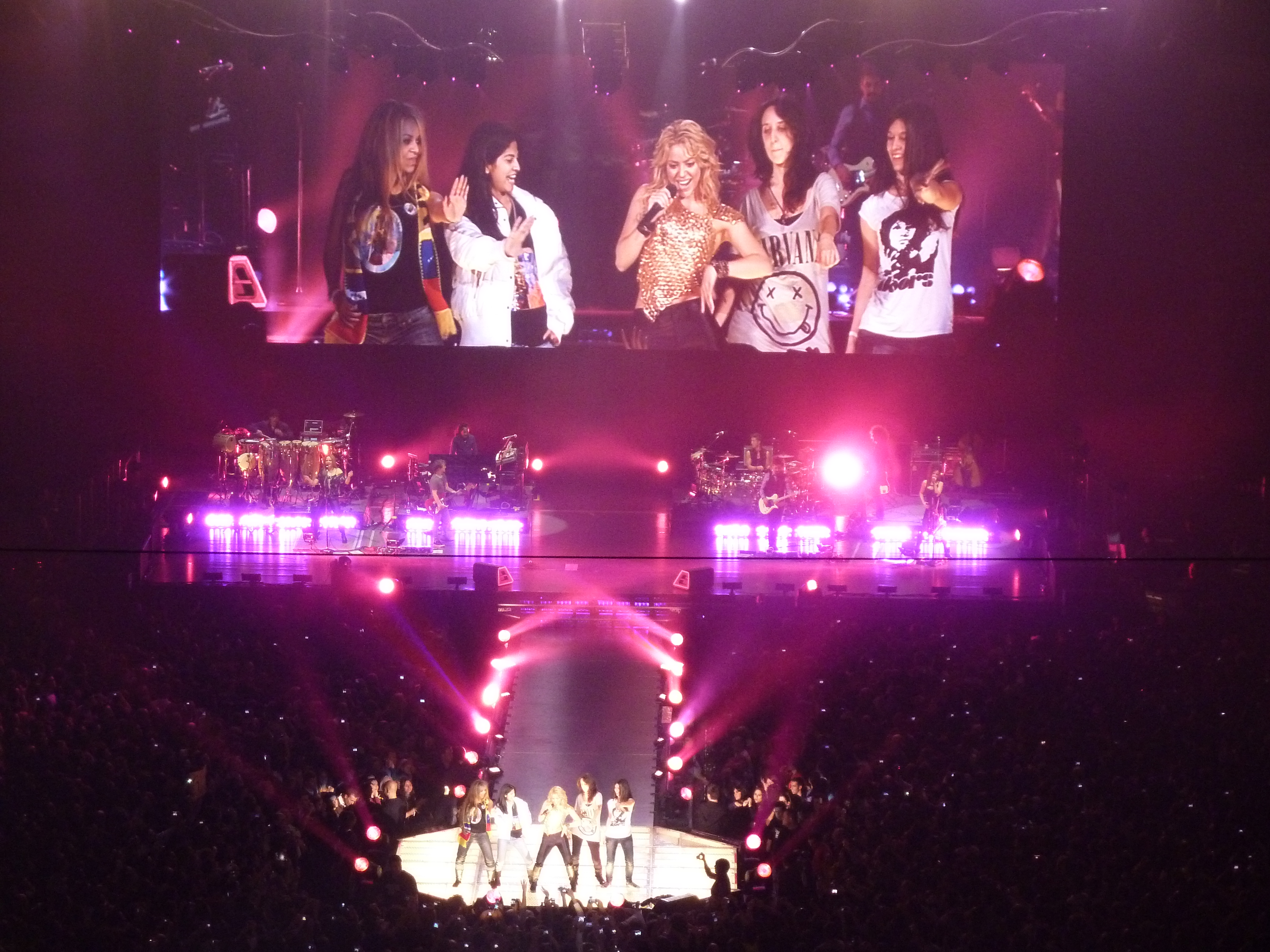
Shakira bringing fans on stage to do a Belly dance choreography during "Whenever, Wherever"

== See also ==
- List of Shakira concerts
- Cultural impact of Shakira
- Shakira Fandom
- List of Shakira records and achievements
