= Tú Serás la Historia de Mi Vida =

1993 single by Shakira

Single by Shakira

from the album Peligro
- Released: July 5, 1993
- Recorded: 1992
- Genre: Latin pop
- Length: 4:52
- Label: Sony Music Colombia
- Songwriter: Desmond Child
- Producer: Eduardo Paz

Shakira singles chronology
"Eres" (1993)	"Tú Serás la Historia de Mi Vida" (1993)	"Estoy Aquí" (1995)

"Tú Serás la Historia de Mi Vida" (English: "You Will Be the Story of My Life") is a song by Colombian singer-songwriter Shakira from her second studio album Peligro (1993). The song was released as the fourth and final single off the album in July 1993. It is a Latin pop ballad written by Desmond Child and produced by Eduardo Paz. Despite not being commercially successful, the song has resonated deeply with Shakira's fans.

== Background ==
Following the release of her commercially unsuccessful debut album Magia in 1991, Shakira released her second album Peligro in 1993. However, she was dissatisfied with the final product and refused to promote it. As a result, the album sold poorly, less than 1000 copies.

"Tú Serás la Historia de Mi Vida" is a Latin pop ballad written by American songwriter and producer Desmond Child. The song is not for sale or officially on streaming anywhere outside of old physical copies of Peligro due to Shakira blocking the re-release of her first two albums citing their "immaturity".

== Release and promotion ==
Upon its release as a single, the song became the only single off the album to receive radio airplay, playing on local radio stations in Colombia. The song was the only one off the album to have an official music video released for.

Shakira promoted the song performing it live at the Show de las Estrellas Colombia in 1993, where she performed multiple songs off the album, including "Brujería", "Eres", and "Controlas Mi Destino", and at La Guajira in 1994, where she also performed her first single "Magia". Shakira also performed the song on some Colombian dates of her Tour Pies Descalzos (1995-1997).
