= Eres (Shakira song) =

1993 single by Shakira

Single by Shakira

from the album Peligro
- B-side: "Brujería"
- Released: 1993
- Genre: Latin pop
- Length: 5:02
- Label: Sony Music Colombia
- Songwriter: Shakira
- Producer: Shakira

Shakira singles chronology
"Brujería" (1993)	"Eres" (1993)	"Tú Serás la Historia de Mi Vida" (1993)

Live video
- "Eres" on YouTube

"Eres" (English: "You are") is a song released by Colombian singer-songwriter Shakira from her second studio album Peligro (1993). Written and produced by Shakira, the song was released as the third single off the album. Shakira performed the song representing Colombia at the Viña del Mar International Song Festival in 1993, coming in the third place.

== Background and release ==
Following the release of her commercially unsuccessful debut album Magia in 1991, Shakira released her second album Peligro in 1993. However, she was dissatisfied with the final product and refused to promote it extensively. As a result, the album sold poorly, less than 1000 copies.

A Latin pop ballad, "Eres" is written and produced by Shakira herself. The song was released physically in vinyl format as a double single with "Brujería". The song is not for sale or officially on streaming anywhere outside of old physical copies of Peligro due to Shakira blocking the re-release of her first two albums citing their "immaturity".

== Live performances ==
"Nervousness is natural, a little bit, right? But I feel very good because the public has treated me wonderfully and I am very happy with that."

— Shakira for Honduran television before performing at the Viña del Mar festival.

In February 1993, 16-year-old Shakira represented Colombia at the XXXIV Vina del Mar International Song Festival at the Quinta Vergara amphitheater in Viña del Mar, Chile. She competed with the song "Eres", performing it multiple times, and came third at the competition. La Red wrote about her performances that her talent was "undeniable", but she "faced technical difficulties that resulted in some off-key mistakes and errors", which were also noted by Semana Magazine and the media outlet Pulzo. La República Magazine described how at the time Shakira's "voice was not yet distinguished by its power" at the time. Alberto Palao from Los 40 commented that Shakira "showed promise" with the song, and that "although she had not yet developed those trills with her voice", she "already had a powerful voice for her young age." Coni Gonzales from Canal 13 praised Shakira, highlighting how "she made her debut and she managed to enchant the Chilean public with her voice, charm and her unmatched Arabic dance moves", and continued how "without a doubt, this was one of the first beginnings of the Colombian singer who today considers her one of the great Latin stars." Shakira herself confessed that the festival "was undoubtedly a very decisive moment" in her career. Quinta Vergara stated that Viña del Mar festival is proud to say that Shakira is an artist "born there." In 2024, her performance of "Eres" at the festival went viral on social media, with many commenting on her beauty and talent. In 1997, she returned to the festival performing songs from her breakthrough album Pies Descalzos (1995). Shakira performed the song "Eres" also at the Colombian El Show de las Estrellas, where she also performed the songs "Brujería", "Controlas Mi Destino", and "Tú Serás la Historia de Mi Vida" from Peligro.

== Track listings ==
12-inch single:

1. "Eres" - 5:02
2. "Brujería" - 4:12
