= Peligro (Shakira album) =

Album by Shakira

Studio album by Shakira
- Released: 25 March 1993
- Recorded: 1992–1993
- Genre: Latin pop, pop rock
- Length: 41:00
- Label: Sony Colombia
- Producer: Eduardo Paz

Shakira chronology
Magia (1991)	Peligro (1993)	Pies Descalzos (1995)

Singles from Peligro
- 1. "Peligro" Released: 29 January 1993; 2. "Brujería" Released: 17 April 1993; 3. "Eres" Released: 11 May 1993; 4. "Tú Serás la Historia de Mi Vida" Released: 5 July 1993

Peligro (English: Danger, Spanish pronunciation: [peˈli.ɣ̞ɾo]) is the second studio album by Colombian singer-songwriter Shakira, released on 25 March 1993 by Sony Music Colombia. The third single, "Eres", earned her the third place at the 1993 Viña del Mar International Song Festival.

== Background ==
Shakira was signed to Sony Music Colombia at the age of 13, with the deal to record three albums. While Magia, her debut album, was not much of a success commercially, with only 1,200 copies sold, the songs from that record garnered frequent radio play on Colombian stations and, according to author Ximena Diego, showed her potential.

Despite Magia's low sales, Sony Colombia had greater expectations for Shakira's second album, hoping that it would heighten the limited popularity she was already enjoying. The production and release of Peligro showed the young singer that "the road of the artist was not an easy one". The several months it took to make the record was for Shakira a frustrating period. The result was an "odd album" that did not fare well with the singer.

== Composition ==
The album features songs written by Shakira and other composers, including Eddie Sierra, who wrote "El Amor de Mi Vida" for Ricky Martin's self-titled debut album. Lyrically, Peligro addresses the themes of love and heartbreak, but the closing track "1968" deals with recent history and politics. The press release by Sony Colombia, who seemed satisfied with the final product, described the album's lyrical content as "profound", "direct" and "filled with magic and poetry". Musically, the record has a "North American ballad treatment", with instrumentation of rock guitars, acoustic pianos and Kenny G-style saxophones. The song "Brujería" was written by Eduardo Paz, who utilized for Shakira Arabic influences.

== Release and promotion ==
The Peligro album was released in March 1993. The songs "Peligro", Brujería, "Eres", and "Tú Serás la Historia de Mi Vida" were released as singles. The last one, composed by Desmond Child, was the only single off the record that had a music video. It was also played on Shakira's first Tour Pies Descalzos, as was the track "Magia" from her debut record Magia. Shakira was not pleased with the final result of Peligro's production and limited her participation in the album's promotion. The label sent it to some radio stations and "Tú Serás la Historia de Mi Vida" was played on local stations several months later. However, Shakira's lack of support resulted in the cancellation of rehearsals and live performances. The record was better made and received than Magia had been, but not properly promoted, it failed to live up to the expectations of Sony Colombia. Like Magia, Peligro has not been officially sold for decades and is difficult to find and expensive to buy on secondary markets.

Shakira then acted in the telenovela El Oasis, where she sang the main theme titled "Lo Mío". In 2003, she refused to allow the re-release of both Magia and Peligro because of what she considered their "immaturity".

== Track listing ==
No.	Title	Writer(s)	Length
1.	"Eres"	Shakira	5:02
2.	"Último Momento"	Eduardo Paz	4:56
3.	"Tú Serás la Historia de Mi Vida"	Desmond Child	4:52
4.	"Peligro"	Paz	4:39
5.	"Quince Años"	Shakira	3:30
6.	"Brujería"	Paz	4:12
7.	"Eterno Amor"	Eddie Sierra	4:47
8.	"Controlas Mi Destino"	Shakira	4:36
9.	"Este Amor es lo Más Bello del Mundo"	Shakira	4:20
10.	"1968"	Shakira (lyrics & music); Paz (lyrics)	4:44

== Personnel ==
Credits from album cover:

- Shakira Mebarak— songwriter, vocals, guitar
- Eduardo Paz — producer, songwriter, arrangements
- Gabriel Muñoz — co-producer
- Gustavo Arenas — mixing engineer
- Adolfo Concho — programming the drums
- Ernesto (Teto) Ocampo — electric and acoustic guitars
- Juanito Benavidez — saxophones
- Mauricio Jaramillo — tenor saxophone in "Tú serás la historia de mi vida"
- Antonio (Pollo) Burbano — soprano saxophone in "1968"
- Willie Salcedo — percussion, background vocals
- Elsa Riberos, Alexandra Villar, Pilar (Pili) Mejia, Mauricio Nieto, Ernesto Baraya — background vocals
- Rodrigo Muñoz — sound engineer, additional arrangements
- Mauricio Cano, Ricardo Cortés — sound engineers
- Javier Díaz Granados, Fabio Enrique Torres — cover graphics
- William Mebarak, Mónica Ariza — management

== Release history ==
Country	Date	Label	Format	Catalog
Colombia	25 March 1993	Sony Colombia	LP	51473102
