= Clark discography =

Discography of British electronic musician Clark

- Studio albums: 13
- EPs: 18
- Soundtrack albums: 6
- Compilation albums: 1
- Remix albums: 1
- Singles: 22
- Music videos: 17
- Remixes: 42

The discography of British electronic musician Clark (formerly Chris Clark) consists of thirteen studio albums, six soundtrack albums, one compilation album, one remix album, eighteen extended plays, and twenty-two singles as lead artist. Clark has released music on Warp Records (2001–2022), Deutsche Grammophon (2019–2021), and his own Throttle Records label (2018–present).

== Albums ==
=== Studio albums ===
List of studio albums
Title	Album details
Clarence Park (Note: Released as Chris Clark.)	Released: April 2001; Label: Warp Records; Formats: LP, CD, digital
Empty the Bones of You	Released: September 2003; Label: Warp Records; Formats: 2×LP, CD, digital
Body Riddle	Released: October 2006; Label: Warp Records; Formats: 2×LP, CD, digital
Turning Dragon	Released: January 2008; Label: Warp Records; Formats: 2×LP, CD, digital
Totems Flare	Released: July 2009; Label: Warp Records; Formats: 2×LP, CD, digital
Iradelphic	Released: April 2012; Label: Warp Records; Formats: LP, CD, digital
Clark	Released: November 2014; Label: Warp Records; Formats: 2×LP, CD, digital
Death Peak	Released: April 2017; Label: Warp Records; Formats: 2×LP, CD, digital
Playground in a Lake	Released: March 2021; Label: Deutsche Grammophon; Formats: 2×LP, CD, digital
Sus Dog	Released: May 2023; Label: Throttle Records; Formats: 2×LP, CD, digital
Cave Dog	Released: December 2023; Label: Throttle Records; Formats: 12" vinyl, digital
Steep Stims	Released: November 2025; Label: Throttle Records; Formats: 2×LP, CD, digital
Steep Stims II	Released: October 2026; Label: Throttle Records; Formats: CD, digital

=== Soundtrack albums ===
List of soundtrack albums
Title	Album details
The Last Panthers	Released: March 2016; Label: Warp Records; Formats: LP, CD, digital
Kiri Variations	Released: July 2019; Label: Throttle Records; Formats: LP, digital
Daniel Isn't Real (Note: Re-released as Daniel Isn't Real (Expanded Edition) in 2020.)	Released: December 2019; Label: Deutsche Grammophon; Formats: 2×LP, digital
Lisey's Story	Released: June 2021; Label: WaterTower Music / Loud Robot; Formats: digital
In Camera	Released: September 2024; Label: Throttle Records; Formats: LP, digital
We Bury the Dead	Released: January 2026; Label: Throttle Records; Formats: LP, digital

=== Compilation albums ===
List of compilation albums
Title	Album details
05-10 (Note: Compilation of new tracks, unreleased archive material and rarities, released alongside the remastered reissue of Body Riddle.)	Released: September 2022; Label: Throttle Records / Warp Records; Formats: 2×LP, CD, digital

=== Remix albums ===
List of remix albums
Title	Album details
Feast / Beast	Released: September 2013; Label: Warp Records; Formats: 4×LP, 2×CD, digital

== Extended plays ==
List of extended plays
Title	Album details
Ceramics Is the Bomb (Note: Released as Chris Clark.)	Released: May 2003; Label: Warp Records; Formats: 12" vinyl, CD, digital
Throttle Furniture	Released: February 2006; Label: Warp Records; Formats: CD3
Throttle Clarence (Note: Shipped with copies of Body Riddle ordered from Warpmart (now Bleep).)	Released: October 2006; Label: Warp Records; Formats: CD3
Ted E.P.	Released: March 2007; Label: Warp Records; Formats: 12" vinyl, digital
Throttle Promoter	Released: December 2007; Label: Warp Records; Formats: 12" vinyl, digital
Growls Garden	Released: March 2009; Label: Warp Records; Formats: 12" vinyl, CD, digital
Fantasm Planes (Note: Counterpart release to Iradelphic.)	Released: September 2012; Label: Warp Records; Formats: 12" vinyl, digital
Iradelphic Sessions	Released: April 2013; Label: Warp Records; Formats: digital
Superscope	Released: March 2014; Label: Warp Records; Formats: 12" vinyl, digital
Edits	Released: December 2014; Label: Warp Records; Formats: 12" vinyl, digital
Flame Rave	Released: March 2015; Label: Warp Records; Formats: 12" vinyl, digital
Rellik EP	Released: September 2017; Label: Warp Records; Formats: digital
Honey Badger / Pig	Released: December 2017; Label: Warp Records; Formats: 12" vinyl, digital
E.C.S.T. T.R.A.X.	Released: September 2018; Label: Throttle Records; Formats: 12" vinyl, digital
Branding Problem	Released: November 2019; Label: Throttle Records; Formats: 12" vinyl, digital
Modal Stims	Released: March 2026; Label: Throttle Records; Formats: digital
Opponent Stims	Released: May 2026; Label: Throttle Records; Formats: 12" vinyl, digital
Entity Stims	Released: August 2026; Label: Throttle Records; Formats: digital

== Singles ==
=== As lead artist ===
List of singles as lead artist
Title	Year	Album
"Peak Magnetic"	2017	Death Peak
"Hoova"	2017	Death Peak
"Cannibal Homecoming"	2019	Kiri Variations
"Small"	2021	Playground in a Lake
"Suspension Reservoir (Air Version)"	2021	Playground in a Lake
"Shut You Down (Mogwai Remix)"	2021	Non-album single
"Frau Wav (Brief Fling)"	2022	05-10
"Sparrow Arc Tall"	2022	05-10
"Town Crank"	2023	Sus Dog
"Clutch Pearlers"	2023	Sus Dog
"Dismissive"	2023	Sus Dog
"Dolgoch Tape"	2023	Sus Dog
"Vardo"	2023	Cave Dog
"Alyosha Lying"	2023	Cave Dog
"Blasphs_Karaoke"	2023	Cave Dog
"Green Breaking"	2024	In Camera
"Superstar"	2024	In Camera
"Love Lock Floot"	2024	Non-album singles
"Donk Jewel"	2024	Non-album singles
"Civilians"	2025	Steep Stims
"Blowtorch Thimble (Altvirus Mix)"	2025	Steep Stims
"Janus Modal"	2025	Steep Stims

=== As featured artist ===
List of singles as featured artist
Title	Year	Artist	Release
"On the Road"	2019	Yamila	Iras Fajro
"Drowned Haiku"	2021	Víkingur Ólafsson	Reflections
"Outsider"	2023	Nathan Fake	Crystal Vision
"Orbiting Meadows"	2026	Nathan Fake	Evaporator
"Viper" (feat. Saskia)	2026	Bicep	"Air / Lemonder / Viper"

=== Split singles ===
List of split singles
Title	Year	Artists	Label
"Willenhall / Baskerville Grinch"	2012	Bibio / Clark	Warp Records
"A Badman Sound / Heath Town / Inf Inf Inf Inf"	2016	Mark Pritchard / Bibio / Clark	Warp Records
"Bobbie Caris / Idle Withdrawal"	2017	Clark / Com Truise	Warp Records, Ghostly International
"Needles / Poland (Rytm) (Live Take 2023 Mix)"	2025	Mark Van Hoen / Clark	Dell'Orso Records, Throttle Records

== Other appearances ==
List of other appearances
Title	Year	Release	Label
"Roughage"	1999	When Shapes Join Together	Tru Thoughts
"Spinning Spines (Aldi Edit)"	2002	Magic Bus Tracks	Warp Records
"Ted"	2006	Renaissance (soundtrack)	Naïve
"So Malleable" (Note: Cover of the Milanese song.)	2009	Warp20 (Recreated)	Warp Records
"Herzog"	2009	Warp20 (Chosen)	Warp Records
"Rattlesnake"	2009	Warp20 (Unheard)	Warp Records
"Nordic Wilt"	2012	Modeselektion Vol. 02	Monkeytown Records
"Mirage Trooper"	2016	Adult Swim Singles Program 2016	[adult swim]
"Shadow Banger"	2016	#savefabric	Fabric Records
"Mammal Step Sequence"	2019	Mari Samuelsen - Mari	Deutsche Grammophon
"Laptop Stand"	2020	Care4Life Sampler 1	Care4Life

== Remixes ==
List of remixes
Title	Year	Original artist(s)	Label
"Hammersmashed" (Note: Remixed as Chris Clark.)	2005	Ra-X	Angelmaker Records
"Untitled" ("Bendir")	2005	Glen Velez	Schematic Music Company
"Bring Out Your Dead"	2007	Friendly Fires	People in the Sky
"Hearts & Minds"	2007	Dextro	Grönland Records
"Mr Bad News"	2007	Milanese	Planet Mu
"Kitchen Sink"	2007	Amon Tobin	Ninja Tune
"Astronaut"	2008	Yila featuring Scroobius Pip	Sunday Best Recordings
"Sweet Memory"	2008	Pivot	Warp Records
"Till the Day Falls"	2008	Paral-lel	Barely Breaking Even
"S'vive"	2009	Bibio	Warp Records
"Let's Get Clinical"	2009	Maxïmo Park	Warp Records
"Die Slow"	2010	HEALTH	City Slang
"Braid of Voices"	2010	DM Stith	Asthmatic Kitty
"Cantstandtherain"	2010	Silverman	One 4 Ho
"Dulceria"	2010	Aufgang	InFiné
"Redlight"	2010	Massive Attack	Virgin Records
"Freestate"	2011	Depeche Mode	Mute Records
"Glow"	2011	Kuedo	Planet Mu
"D&T"	2013	Letherette	Ninja Tune
"Let's Go"	2013	Rone featuring High Priest	InFiné
"Peter"	2013	Nils Frahm	Erased Tapes Records
"Fentiger"	2013	Nathan Fake	Warp Records
"Spur"	2013	Barker & Baumecker	Warp Records
"Sea"	2013	Vampillia	Warp Records
"My Machines"	2013	Battles	Warp Records
"Do You Want What I Need"	2014	Milosh	Deadly Records
"Bananfluer Overalt"	2014	Jaga Jazzist	Ninja Tune
"101"	2015	Portico	Ninja Tune
"Path 5"	2016	Max Richter	Deutsche Grammophon
"Power Curve"	2016	Hybrid	Sony Classical
"Only You"	2017	Chris Lee (Li Yuchun)	PC Music
"Night Terrors"	2017	Matt Berry	Acid Jazz Records
"Neo Raummusik"	2018	Sugizo	Sephirot
"Not The News"	2019	Thom Yorke	XL Recordings
"U Never Call Me"	2020	Jadu Heart	VLF Records
"Petit_a"	2021	GoGo Penguin	Blue Note Records
"Deletia"	2022	Fyfe & Iskra Strings	Benvolio Music
"Love Me More"	2022	Mitski	Dead Oceans
"A Clearing"	2023	Tom Rogerson	Western Vinyl
"Voyage"	2023	Theodore	United We Fly
"I Lost My Mind"	2024	Tidy Kid	Hauch Records
"A Valley"	2024	Yair Elazar Glotman	Scrawl World

== Music videos ==
List of music videos
Title	Year	Director(s)
"Gob Coitus" (Note: Credited as Chris Clark.)	2003	Lynn Fox
"Ted"	2006	1stAveMachine (Arvind Palep)
"Herr Barr"	2006	James Healy
"Black Stone"	2012	The Vikings (Xander & Bjoern)
"Superscope"	2014	Vincent Oliver (Adoxo)
"Beacon"	2014	Matti Gajek
"Winter Linn"	2014	Christopher Hewitt
"To Live and Die in Grantham"	2015	Christopher Hewitt
"Peak Magnetic"	2017	Sander Houtkruijer
"Lambent Rag"	2021	Melanie Lane
"Citrus"	2021	Jonathan Zawada
"Small"	2021	Broken Antenna
"Medicine" (feat. Thom Yorke)	2023	Dylan Hayes
"Dolgoch Tape"	2023	Dylan Hayes
"Dismissive"	2024	Luc Reso Janin
"Superstar"	2024	Naqqash Khalid
"Civilians"	2025	Melanie Lane × Corps Conspirators

== Production and mastering credits ==
List of production and mastering credits for other artists
Title	Year	Artist	Role	Label
Nothing Else	2010	Lorn	Mastering	Brainfeeder
"Confianza"	2021	Arca	Co-production, writing	XL Recordings
Ritual	2024	Jon Hopkins	Additional production, mixing	Domino
