= Lisey's Story (soundtrack) =

Soundtrack album by Clark
- Released: 25 June 2021
- Recorded: 2020–2021
- Studio: AIR Studios, London; Abbey Road Studios, London
- Genre: Film score; electronic; modern classical
- Length: 72:37
- Label: WaterTower Music / Loud Robot
- Producer: Clark

Clark chronology
Playground in a Lake (2021)	Lisey's Story (2021)	Sus Dog (2023)

Lisey's Story is a soundtrack album by British electronic musician Clark, released on 25 June 2021 on WaterTower Music and Loud Robot. It is the original score for the eight-part Apple TV+ limited series Lisey's Story, based on Stephen King's 2006 novel of the same name, directed by Pablo Larraín and starring Julianne Moore and Clive Owen. Larraín approached Clark after hearing the Daniel Isn't Real soundtrack (2019). The score was recorded with a 30-piece string ensemble at AIR Studios and a 30-piece choir at Abbey Road Studios.

== Background ==
Larraín heard Clark's Daniel Isn't Real score and contacted him directly. Clark recalled: "Pablo, the director, heard Daniel Isn't Real, which is a film I scored in 2019. He heard the soundtrack and just called me basically, wanting to work with me off the back of that OST." Clark was also drawn to the project by Stephen King, who wrote the screenplay, and executive producer J. J. Abrams.

Larraín wanted emotional themes tied to individual characters rather than functional backdrop music. Clark described needing to "climb inside the interior world of the characters". The musical palette comprised "slow-moving interior worlds with lush expansive orchestral voicings". Clark and Larraín bonded over Krzysztof Penderecki's music as used in The Shining. Larraín suggested that one cue, "King's Dream", draw on Thomas Newman's scores for King adaptations.

The main title theme was developed on a Prophet 6 synth sequencer; the lead melody "came out in about 10 minutes". It progressed through computer MIDI arrangements and full orchestral scoring, recorded with violinist Rakhi Singh and a 30-piece string ensemble. Sustained string notes were recorded at AIR Studios, with spiccato parts recorded separately at Abbey Road Studios. Clark noted that "40 or 50 hours of planning went into 90 seconds of music".

The Long Boy monster's vocal sound was created by a 30-piece choir of 20 men and 10 women at Abbey Road Studios. Larraín wanted the voice to be "believably human" rather than theatrical, describing his vision of "a monster that would have feelings, that would have emotions". The choir employed percussive vocal techniques to achieve the effect.

=== Expanded edition ===
Seven bonus tracks were released exclusively on Apple Music alongside the standard 25-track edition.

== Critical reception ==
Off the Tracks gave the soundtrack a positive review, calling the score "sublime".

== Track listing ==
No.	Title	Length
1.	"Lisey's Story (Main Title Theme)"	1:35
2.	"Crossing Over"	3:10
3.	"Scott Jinx"	2:17
4.	"Lisey Jinx"	1:21
5.	"Feral Jim"	2:48
6.	"Lisey's Requiem"	2:47
7.	"Box of Photographs"	2:10
8.	"King's Dream"	1:36
9.	"Liminal Shifting"	3:38
10.	"Long Boy Arrival"	3:28
11.	"Dark Acid Climbs"	3:21
12.	"A Ritual Scouring"	2:43
13.	"Amanda Gleans"	1:59
14.	"Boo'ya Moon"	3:59
15.	"Boo'ya Pool"	2:39
16.	"Boo'ya Dream"	0:47
17.	"Prime Meander"	3:43
18.	"Paulagony"	3:24
19.	"Polychord Laser"	4:31
20.	"King's Chamber"	3:11
21.	"Undertow Seduction"	4:23
22.	"It Sees Me"	3:08
23.	"Gorogoneion"	2:42
24.	"Escalation Chamber"	2:08
25.	"Scott Shifting"	5:09
Total length:		72:37

Apple Music bonus tracks
No.	Title	Length
26.	"Lisey's Requiem (Opening)"	3:23
27.	"Hollyhocks"	3:02
28.	"Dismembered Dooley Waltz"	2:47
29.	"Red Hands"	2:13
30.	"Three Sisters"	3:51
31.	"Ice House Pleen"	2:15
32.	"Utter Devastation on Tranquilisers"	2:22

== Personnel ==
Credits adapted from WaterTower Music.

- Clark – composer, producer
- Rakhi Singh – violin
- 30-piece string ensemble (AIR Studios)
- 30-piece choir (Abbey Road Studios)
