= Sus Dog =

Studio album by Clark
- Released: 26 May 2023
- Studio: East Connection Music Recording, Studio 22
- Genre: electronic; art pop; experimental
- Length: 45:22
- Label: Throttle Records
- Producer: Clark; Thom Yorke (exec.)

Clark chronology
Playground in a Lake (2021)	Sus Dog (2023)	Cave Dog (2023)

Sus Dog is the tenth studio album by British electronic musician Clark, released on 26 May 2023 on Throttle Records, his own label. The album is executive produced by Thom Yorke, who also contributes bass and vocals, and features performances by drummer Richard Spaven, violinist Rakhi Singh, and vocalist Anika. It is Clark's first album to prominently feature his own singing voice.

Sus Dog received generally positive reviews from music critics, with an aggregate score of 78 out of 100 on Metacritic. Critics praised Clark's vocal performances and the collaboration with Yorke.

== Background ==
After previously swapping remixes, Clark approached Yorke seeking feedback on his new vocal material. Yorke responded favourably, stating that Clark's singing represented "new shark-infested waters" and that it was not "the usual singer songwriter guff". Yorke subsequently took on the role of executive producer, also playing bass and making vocal contributions on the track "Medicine". In an interview, Yorke described his involvement "I ended up being a kind of backseat driver as he pieced all the oddness of it together, which was fascinating".

The album marks a departure from Clark's preceding orchestral and soundtrack work — Playground in a Lake (2021), Kiri Variations (2019), and the Daniel Isn't Real soundtrack (2019) — towards vocal-led songwriting. Clark described the record as "the first one where it's a bunch of songs, weird songs as they may be" and characterised the tracks thematically as "a bunch of love songs". Broader themes explored on the album include trust, social anxiety, mortality, and bullying.

"Town Crank" was released as the lead single on 24 January 2023, coinciding with the album announcement. Further singles "Clutch Pearlers" and "Dolgoch Tape" followed ahead of release. "Medicine", featuring Yorke on vocals, was released on the album's launch day alongside a music video directed by Dylan Hayes that uses deepfake technology to merge Clark and Yorke's faces. Hayes said he wanted an "uncanny synergy of both their faces and voices, causing a question of who’s who" Clark supported the album with a 16-date European and North American tour from April to June 2023.

Clark began work on a companion album of new tracks and extensive reworkings, Cave Dog, while awaiting the release of Sus Dog; it was released in December 2023.

== Music ==
DJ Mag described Sus Dog as Clark's closest approach to pop songwriting while remaining experimental in character, noting the collaboration with Spaven, Singh, and Anika as broadening the album's textural range. Clark cited Thundercat and Beach House among his influences for the track "Bully", while "Dolgoch Tape" originated as a psychedelic-influenced piece written on a train. The title track features vocals from Anika, and "Medicine" is a duet with Yorke.

Clark discussed his decision to foreground vocals as a response to developments in artificial intelligence-generated music, noting that singing provides "a direct way to have a thumbprint on what you do".

== Critical reception ==
Professional ratings
Aggregate scores
Source	Rating
Metacritic	78/100
Review scores
Source	Rating
AllMusic	4/5 stars
Evening Standard	4/5 stars
Mojo	4/5 stars
The Observer	4/5 stars
Pitchfork	7.7/10
Uncut	7/10
Slant Magazine	2.5/5 stars

Sus Dog received generally positive reviews. At Metacritic, the album holds an aggregate score of 78 out of 100 based on 6 critic reviews. The Observer's Damien Morris gave the album four out of five stars. Mojo awarded four out of five stars, calling it the sound of Clark finding his voice. Pitchfork's Harry Tafoya gave it 7.7 out of 10, describing it as warm and gratifying and praising Clark's falsetto as a counterpoint to the intricate production. AllMusic's Heather Phares gave four out of five stars, highlighting the album's creativity after several years of darker thematic work. Uncut's Sharon O'Connell gave 7 out of 10, noting the balancing of melancholia and euphoria.

Slant Magazine was more critical, noting Radiohead-adjacent stylistic elements in the stuttering electronics and vocal approach but questioning how organically they integrated with Clark's established sound.

== Track listing ==
All tracks are written by Christopher Stephen Clark.

No.	Title	Length
1.	"Alyosha"	4:38
2.	"Town Crank"	3:39
3.	"Sus Dog"	4:36
4.	"Clutch Pearlers"	4:47
5.	"Over Empty Streets"	1:49
6.	"Wedding"	3:11
7.	"Forest"	2:51
8.	"Dolgoch Tape"	2:39
9.	"Bully"	4:43
10.	"Dismissive"	4:17
11.	"Medicine"	5:11
12.	"Ladder"	2:58
Total length:		45:22

== Personnel ==
Credits adapted from Bandcamp liner notes.

- Clark – vocals, instruments, production, mixing
- Thom Yorke – executive producer, bass, vocals ("Medicine")
- Richard Spaven – drums
- Rakhi Singh – violin, backing vocals
- Anika – vocals ("Sus Dog")
- Budapest Art Orchestra – strings
- Matt Colton – mastering
- Jonathan Zawada – artwork, design
