= Steep Stims =

Studio album by Clark
- Released: 7 November 2025
- Genres: Electronic; IDM; experimental
- Length: 47:57
- Label: Throttle Records
- Producer: Clark

Clark chronology
In Camera (2024)	Steep Stims (2025)	We Bury the Dead (2026)

Steep Stims is the twelfth studio album by British electronic musician Clark, released on 7 November 2025 on Throttle Records. Recorded primarily using an Access Virus synthesizer as a deliberate creative constraint, the album marks a return to purely instrumental electronic music following the vocal-driven Sus Dog (2023). Steep Stims received generally positive reviews from music critics.

Clark released a sequel to the album, Steep Stims II on 27 October 2026, featuring previous tracks from his Entity Stims EP.

== Background ==
Clark discovered the Access Virus synthesizer at MESS (Melbourne Electronic Sound Studio), a facility run by Robin Fox. The first patch he played on the instrument became "Blowtorch Thimble". Roughly 80–90% of the album was made using the Virus and a drum machine as a self-imposed limitation. Clark described the album as sitting alongside his self-titled Clark (2014) and Death Peak (2017) in palette and tone. "18EDO Bailiff" features a piano tuned to 18 equal divisions of the octave by microtonal specialist Angus Donald.

"Blowtorch Thimble" was released as the lead single on 3 September 2025, alongside the album announcement. "Civilians" followed on 30 September 2025; a music video directed and choreographed by Melanie Lane and Corps Conspirators was premiered on 1 October 2025.

== Critical reception ==
Professional ratings
Review scores
Source	Rating
AllMusic	4.5/5 stars
Mojo	4/5 stars
Uncut	80
OndaRock	6/10

Heather Phares of AllMusic called it "as sophisticated in its execution as his more overtly ambitious projects". Inverted Audio described it as "rich in feeling" and praised its blend of trance, IDM and dancefloor energy.

The album received coverage in the French press, including reviews in Les Inrockuptibles and Le Monde. Tsugi reviewed the album favourably, and Radio Micheline named it their Album of the Week.

== Track listing ==
No.	Title	Length
1.	"Gift and Wound"	2:13
2.	"Infinite Roller"	5:22
3.	"No Pills U"	2:13
4.	"Janus Modal"	6:26
5.	"18EDO Bailiff"	1:48
6.	"Globecore Flats"	5:37
7.	"Blowtorch Thimble"	3:30
8.	"Civilians"	3:55
9.	"Inpatient's Day Out"	5:10
10.	"Who Booed the Goose"	3:18
11.	"5 Millionth Cave Painting"	1:01
12.	"Negation Loop"	2:45
13.	"Micro Lyf"	4:36
Total length:		47:57

== Personnel ==
Credits adapted from liner notes.

- Clark – composer, producer, performer, mixer
- Matt Colton – mastering (at Metropolis)
- Angus Donald – 18EDO piano tuning
- Alma Haser – photography
- Charlie Noon – design
