= In Camera (soundtrack) =

Soundtrack album by Clark
- Released: 13 September 2024
- Genre: Film score; electronic; ambient
- Length: 50:42
- Label: Throttle Records
- Producer: Clark

Clark chronology
Cave Dog (2023)	In Camera (2024)	Steep Stims (2025)

In Camera is a soundtrack album by British electronic musician Clark, released on 13 September 2024 on Throttle Records. It is an expanded version of Clark's score for the British drama film In Camera (2023), written and directed by Naqqash Khalid in his feature debut and starring Nabhaan Rizwan.

== Background ==
Khalid wanted the score to function as "a whole new layer of storytelling" rather than a conventional film score, describing the finished work as "another character in the film - like an extension of the film's atmosphere and interiority". Clark described the collaboration: "I loved how precise Naqqash wanted everything to be. Precise but also extremely keen to hear suggestions and not flinch at curveballs."

The film had its world premiere in the Proxima competition at the Karlovy Vary International Film Festival in July 2023. It went on to win the FIPRESCI Award at the Thessaloniki International Film Festival and the Talents de Demain award for best debut feature at the Dinard Festival of British and Irish Film. The film also received nominations for Best Lead Performance (Nabhaan Rizwan) and Best Supporting Performance (Amir El-Masry) at the British Independent Film Awards.

Clark used his own vocals as a central element of the score, processed and abstracted to match the film's tone, which he described as the project's most distinctive challenge. He originally intended to release only the film cues, but expanded the album with newly written material that matched the tone and emotion of the film. Clark described the album as "drenched in muted joy/dark euphoria".

The album includes a cover of "Superstar", originally recorded by Delaney & Bonnie and made famous by the Carpenters' 1971 version. Khalid re-edited footage from the film into a music video for the cover.

== Reception ==
Piers Martin of Uncut gave the album 7 out of 10, calling it a "gauzy score" and noting that Clark's vocals lend the "largely beatless collection a vulnerability", particularly across the "Blood" trilogy. Headphone Commute featured the album noting that it continued Clark's established aesthetic of "gritty textures and lush melodies" and praising the integration of abstracted vocals into the score. Boomkat described it as "a deeply rewarding listen that fits perfectly into the canon of Clark soundtracks".

== Track listing ==
All tracks are written by Christopher Stephen Clark, except where noted.

No.	Title	Length
1.	"Green Wash"	1:02
2.	"Green Breaking"	3:50
3.	"Superstar" (Bramlett, Bramlett, Russell)	3:00
4.	"Bleeding Building"	3:03
5.	"Running Dreams"	3:24
6.	"It's 450"	2:44
7.	"Probe"	3:20
8.	"Bo"	1:18
9.	"Head Phone Hospital"	1:28
10.	"Sensual Dismay"	2:47
11.	"Aden Murmur"	5:05
12.	"Captive Bliss"	3:58
13.	"Vending Machine/Portal"	2:17
14.	"Non Specific Interview"	1:07
15.	"Tangent Cloak 1"	2:13
16.	"Tangent Cloak 2"	2:54
17.	"Exhausted"	1:46
18.	"Green Blood"	1:16
19.	"Blue Blood"	1:46
20.	"Blood"	2:24
Total length:		50:42

== Personnel ==
Credits adapted from Bandcamp.

- Clark - writing, production, performance, mixing
- John Dunk - saxophone ("Bleeding Building", "Aden Murmur")
- Finn McNicholas - guitar ("Green Breaking")
- Cicely Balston - mastering (at Air Studios)
- Felix Gray - design
