= Daniel Isn't Real =

2019 film directed by Adam Egypt Mortimer

- Theatrical release poster
- Directed by: Adam Egypt Mortimer
- Screenplay by: Adam Egypt Mortimer; Brian DeLeeuw
- Based on: In This Way I Was Saved by Brian DeLeeuw
- Produced by: Elijah Wood; Daniel Noah; Josh C. Waller; Lisa Whalen
- Starring: Miles Robbins; Patrick Schwarzenegger; Sasha Lane; Mary Stuart Masterson; Hannah Marks; Chukwudi Iwuji; Peter McRobbie
- Cinematography: Lyle Vincent
- Edited by: Brett W. Bachman
- Music by: Clark
- Production companies: SpectreVision; ACE Pictures; Voltage Pictures
- Distributed by: Samuel Goldwyn Films
- Release dates: March 9, 2019 (SXSW); December 6, 2019 (United States)
- Running time: 100 minutes
- Country: United States
- Language: English
- Box office: $75,407

Daniel Isn't Real is a 2019 American psychological horror film directed by Adam Egypt Mortimer, from a screenplay by Mortimer and Brian DeLeeuw, based upon the novel In This Way I Was Saved by DeLeeuw. It stars Miles Robbins, Patrick Schwarzenegger, Sasha Lane, Mary Stuart Masterson, Hannah Marks, Chukwudi Iwuji and Peter McRobbie.

Daniel Isn't Real had its world premiere at South by Southwest on March 9, 2019. It was released on December 6, 2019, by Samuel Goldwyn Films in select theaters and digitally.

== Plot ==
As a child, Luke witnesses the aftermath of a mass shooting at a neighborhood coffee shop. He meets another boy among the onlookers at the scene: Daniel, who invites him to play and quickly becomes his friend. Although others cannot see Daniel, he appears physically real to Luke. The boys become close playmates.

Their friendship comes to an end when Daniel tricks Luke into blending an entire bottle of his mother Claire's psychiatric medication into a smoothie, poisoning her. Claire makes Luke send Daniel away by symbolically locking him in her mother's old dollhouse.

Years later, college-aged Luke struggles with his social life and his responsibility to his mother, who copes with mental illness. He confides to his therapist, Dr. Cornelius Braun, that he is afraid he will eventually become just like her. One night, while sleeping at his childhood home, Luke unlocks the dollhouse.

Daniel reappears as an adult. He helps Luke thwart a suicide attempt by Claire, succeed in school, and begin a romance with an artist named Cassie. However, he begins exhibiting aggressive behavior and anger when Luke does not obey him. When Luke will not have sex with a psychology student named Sophie on a date, Daniel takes over his body and has sex with Sophie; afterward, he becomes angry and attacks Luke's roommate. Luke begins to question his sanity, believing he may have schizophrenia. He attempts to banish Daniel back to the dollhouse but is unsuccessful.

Luke becomes increasingly unstable, convinced that Daniel is taking over his body while he sleeps. He visits the father of John Thigpen, the shooter whose crime began the film, and learns John also had an invisible friend named Daniel. Luke realizes Daniel is a supernatural entity.

Luke calls Dr. Braun for help, who makes a late-night house call. Daniel appears to Dr. Braun and reveals his true nature. He takes over Luke's body and banishes Luke's consciousness to the dollhouse. Daniel kills Braun and decides his next target will be Cassie.

Daniel is let in by Cassie when he goes to her apartment. Cassie realizes something is wrong, confronts Daniel, and is chased to the rooftop. Cassie begs Luke to come back to reality; hearing her from inside the dollhouse, he summons the will to escape.

In a final confrontation with Luke, Daniel claims he has helped people for centuries, but none of them have deserved his help. Luke realizes Daniel's survival is dependent on Luke being alive; he kills himself by jumping from the roof.

Daniel, surrounded by darkness, reverts to his true monstrous form.

== Cast ==
- Miles Robbins as Luke
  - Griffin Robert Faulkner as Young Luke
- Patrick Schwarzenegger as Daniel
  - Nathan Reid as Young Daniel
- Sasha Lane as Cassie
- Mary Stuart Masterson as Claire
- Hannah Marks as Sophie
- Chukwudi Iwuji as Braun
- Peter McRobbie as Percy Thigpen

== Production ==
In July 2018, it was announced Miles Robbins, Patrick Schwarzenegger, Sasha Lane, and Hannah Marks joined the cast of the film, with Adam Egypt Mortimer directing from a screenplay he co-wrote with Brian DeLeeuw, based upon a novel by DeLeeuw. Elijah Wood, Daniel Noah, Josh C. Waller and Lisa Whalen will produce the film, while Timur Bekbosunov, Johnny Chang, Emma Lee, Peter Wong and Stacy Jorgensen will serve as executive producers, under their SpectreVision and ACE Pictures banners, respectively.

=== Filming ===
Principal photography began in July 2018, in New York City.

=== Music ===
The score was composed by British electronic musician Clark, marking his first feature film commission. Clark described the project as "particularly rewarding scoring Luke, clambering inside the electric majesty of his slowly dissolving mind". The score was recorded with the Budapest Art Orchestra string ensemble, conducted by Pejtsik Péter at East Connection Studio 22 in Budapest, with orchestrations by Finn McNicholas. Headphone Commute described the result as "textural, organic, and incredibly dynamic".

The soundtrack album was released on 6 December 2019 on Deutsche Grammophon. An expanded edition followed in October 2020, featuring a remix by Thom Yorke. Director Pablo Larraín subsequently heard the soundtrack and approached Clark to score Lisey's Story (2021).

== Release ==
It had its world premiere at South by Southwest on March 9, 2019. Shortly after, Samuel Goldwyn Films acquired distribution rights to the film. It was released on December 6, 2019.

=== Critical response ===
On the review aggregator website Rotten Tomatoes, Daniel Isn't Real holds an approval rating of 84% based on 82 reviews, with an average of 7.2/10. The critical consensus reads "Daniel Isn't Real, but the smart, stylish fun waiting for genre lovers in this well-acted suspense thriller is completely genuine." On Metacritic, the film holds an averaged score of 61 out of 100 based on 11 critic reviews, indicating "generally favorable" reviews.

For Variety, Dennis Harvey called the film "first-rate in all departments" and a "stylishly crafted psychological horror thriller". Katie Rife of The A.V. Club wrote that the film is "a slick and thrilling take on the intersection of mental illness and creative inspiration that also doubles as a commentary on toxic masculinity" and awarded the film a B. The Hollywood Reporter's Frank Scheck said "The film is most effective when keeping the viewer off-balance as to whether the title character is merely a figment of Luke's possible mental illness or an actual malevolent force of the demonic variety who seeks more and more control of Luke's behavior".

=== Box office ===
As of May 8, 2024, Daniel Isn't Real grossed $75,407 in the United Arab Emirates, the United Kingdom, Colombia, New Zealand, and South Korea.

== Sequels ==
In December 2020, while speaking to Bloody Disgusting, Mortimer confirmed a "Vortex Trilogy" consisting of Daniel Isn't Real, Archenemy, and a planned third film, saying "mark my words we are going to make a third movie in the Vortex Trilogy that will have Daniel return and force Max, in some form, to deal with it. A crisis on infinite vortices pulling together as many of the characters from both stories as we can fit for a true cosmic horror/cosmic action crossover hybrid!"
