= Totems Flare =

Studio album by Clark
- Released: 13 July 2009
- Genre: IDM; electronic; experimental
- Length: 45:05
- Label: Warp Records
- Producer: Clark

Clark chronology
Turning Dragon (2008)	Totems Flare (2009)	Iradelphic (2012)

Totems Flare is the fifth studio album by British electronic musician Clark, released on 13 July 2009 on Warp Records. Described as the concluding part of a trilogy beginning with Body Riddle (2006) and Turning Dragon (2008), the album combines what was characterised as the "baroque melodics" of Body Riddle with the "hard techno drive" of Turning Dragon. It was Clark's first album to feature his own vocals.

Totems Flare received generally positive reviews from music critics, with praise for its production density and variety, though some reviewers found it less cohesive than Clark's earlier albums.

== Background ==
Totems Flare was Clark's second album in consecutive years, following the purely electronic Turning Dragon (2008). Clark was based in Berlin at the time of recording. He described the album as embracing pop influences, stating: "The ridiculous brute force of modern pop engineering is definitely not something I've ever shied away from." In a later interview, Clark characterised the Turning Dragon and Totems Flare period as being "all about dominating machines and pushing stuff as loud as it could go — still retaining a harmonic, emotional core, but really burying it in distortion and loudness".

The album was preceded by the Growls Garden EP, released in March 2009. Only the title track appeared on the album; the remaining five tracks were exclusive to the EP. The EP marked the first appearance of Clark's own processed vocals in his work.

== Music ==
Reviewers described Totems Flare as Clark's most varied and accessible record, blending elements of IDM, glitch hop, dubstep, ambient and wonky electronica. Drowned in Sound noted that Clark's vocals — described as "shockingly high in the mix" on "Growls Garden" — represented his first conventional hook, with the voice treated as an instrument to be processed rather than a traditional vocal performance. The Skinny situated the album within the glitch hop movement alongside producers Mark Pritchard and Hudson Mohawke.

The album's production was characterised by dense layering and aggressive low-end frequencies. musicOMH praised contrasts between passages of "rare beauty" and harsher textures, describing the result as combining "man made brilliance" with an organic sensibility. Opening track "Outside Plume" sets a contemplative tone before the album shifts into more forceful territory. "Look into the Heart Now" was highlighted as one of the more accessible tracks, with its Detroit techno-influenced loop. "Suns of Temper" was noted for its density and constant rhythmic shifts.

== Critical reception ==
Professional ratings
Review scores
Source	Rating
AllMusic	4/5 stars
Drowned in Sound	8/10
musicOMH	4.5/5 stars
Pitchfork	5.9/10
The Skinny	3/5 stars

Totems Flare received generally positive reviews from music critics. musicOMH gave it 4.5 out of 5, calling it Clark's "best album to date". Drowned in Sound awarded 8 out of 10, praising Clark's "masterfully dense production" and describing it as his "most palatable and varied record to date", while positioning him as a career artist comparable to Björk and Neil Young in longevity. AllMusic's Jason Lymangrover gave the album four out of five stars.

Other reviews were more reserved. Pitchfork's Brian Howe gave it 5.9 out of 10, writing that the album "regains a measure of hospitality" from Turning Dragon but that Clark's vocals were "only partially effective" as the sole new addition. PopMatters was similarly mixed, calling it Clark's "most aggressive recording" but the first since Empty the Bones of You (2003) not to be "an unqualified success".

== Track listing ==
All tracks are written by Christopher Stephen Clark.

No.	Title	Length
1.	"Outside Plume"	4:25
2.	"Growls Garden"	5:03
3.	"Rainbow Voodoo"	4:35
4.	"Look into the Heart Now"	4:03
5.	"Luxman Furs"	4:09
6.	"Totem Crackerjack"	5:25
7.	"Future Daniel"	3:54
8.	"Primary Balloon Landing"	1:17
9.	"Talis"	2:56
10.	"Suns of Temper"	5:48
11.	"Absence"	3:30
Total length:		45:05

iTunes bonus track
No.	Title	Length
12.	"Chill Out DJ"	11:30

Japanese bonus track
No.	Title	Length
12.	"Steepgrass Five"	20:45

== Personnel ==
Credits adapted from the liner notes.

- Clark – writing, production, performance
- Matt Burden – design, illustration
- Naweed – mastering (at Whitfield Mastering)
