= Alma Haser =

German photographer

- Born: 1989 (age 36–37); Black Forest, West Germany
- Education: Nottingham Trent University
- Known for: Photography
- Notable work: Cosmic Surgery (2016)
- Website: www.haser.org

Alma Haser (born 1989) is a German-born portrait photographer living in the United Kingdom. She uses "paper-folding techniques, collage and mixed media to create layers . . . blurring the distinctions between two-dimensional and three-dimensional imagery."

== Early life and education ==
Haser was born in the Black Forest, Germany and lived there until she was six, when she moved to England. Her father is a painter and sculptor, and her mother is a sculptor. When she was 13, her mother took her and her younger brother out of school to travel around the world, including six months on the Cook Islands.

She studied photography at Nottingham Trent University (where she also took up origami), graduating in 2010.

== Work ==
Haser uses "paper-folding techniques, collage and mixed media to create layers . . . blurring the distinctions between two-dimensional and three-dimensional imagery." "In the past she's cut, folded, woven and ripped her photographs to get a final, almost sculptural image."

Haser's Cosmic Surgery portrait series refers to cosmetic surgery, with sitters' faces altered using origami. The title was inspired by her having dyslexia and mixing the words up. As described in Wired:

"Haser photographs people who strike her fancy, be it a friend, a relative, or a stranger she meets on the street. . . . Haser prints one large portrait and as many as 90 smaller images of the person's face. Then she'll spend hours meticulously folding the photos into complex shapes inspired in part by kusudama origami, a Japanese paper-folding technique. Once she's got a shape she likes, Haser places it on the large portrait and photographs it."

For her Identical Twins series, Haser, as described in Colossal :

"combines the portraits of several pairs of twins by literally puzzling their images together. Haser first photographs each twin separately, then prints their corresponding photograph onto a 500 or 1000-piece puzzle. Finally, Haser painstakingly switches every other piece to create two works that are an equal combination of each sibling."

Her Pseudo series "plays with reality, layering and manipulating images of plants and flowers in a comment about the roots of fake news". Other work includes Invisible Wounds, a project with Nick Ballon for Save the Children; and cover artwork for Clark's 2013 album Feast/Beast and 2017 album Death Peak.

== Personal life ==
As of 2019, Haser lived in Hastings on the south east coast of England.

== Publications ==
- Cosmic Surgery.
  - First edition. Self-published, 2015. Edition of 10 copies.
  - Second edition. Self-published, 2016. ISBN 978-1526202970. Edition of 500 copies. Includes two "pop-up" pages, one folded origami attached to one of the pages, and 3 inserted booklets with texts and illustrations.
  - Cosmic Surgery Special Edition Box Set. Self-published, 2016. Includes an audio cassette with a musical piece to accompany the project—Subliminal Sound Pulses composed by Simon James. With text by Piers Bizony. Edition of 50 copies.

== Awards ==
- 2012: Fourth prize, Taylor Wessing Photographic Portrait Prize, London, for a photograph from The Ventriloquists

== See also ==
- Kusudama
