= Death Peak =

Studio album by Clark
- Released: 7 April 2017
- Genre: IDM; electronic; techno
- Length: 43:32
- Label: Warp Records
- Producer: Clark

Clark chronology
The Last Panthers (2016)	Death Peak (2017)	Kiri Variations (2019)

Death Peak is the eighth studio album by British electronic musician Clark, released on 7 April 2017 on Warp Records. It was announced on 17 February 2017, alongside the release of lead single "Peak Magnetic" on SoundCloud. The album cover features a crumpled photograph of Clark by photographer Alma Haser, with design by Dominic Flannigan.

Death Peak received generally favourable reviews from music critics, with an aggregate score of 78 out of 100 on Metacritic. It peaked at number 11 on the UK Dance Albums Chart and number 20 on the UK Independent Albums Chart.

== Background ==
Death Peak followed Clark's first major scoring work, the soundtrack to the Canal+ / Sky Atlantic television series The Last Panthers (2016). Several reviewers noted the influence of that scoring experience on the album's cinematic qualities, with Resident Advisor describing vocal elements — including a children's choir and ethereal textures — as lending the music a film-like atmosphere. The album was Clark's last original studio release on Warp Records, where he had been signed since his late teens, before transitioning to his own label Throttle Records for his Kiri Variations soundtrack (2019) and then Deutsche Grammophon for Playground in a Lake (2021).

Clark's production drew on a combination of digital and analogue equipment, including a Korg Kronos synthesiser, a vintage Nagra tape machine, guitar pedals, and tape loop improvisations. "Peak Magnetic" originated from tape loop improvisations fed through a mixing desk and guitar pedals, while "Living Fantasy" — which Clark identified as his personal favourite — paired the Korg Kronos with the Nagra to create contrasts between digital and analogue textures. The closing track "Un U.K." was written in four days during the Brexit period while Clark was in Melbourne; its climactic section combines 35 time-stretched EDM tracks processed through guitar pedals, along with field recordings of wasps tuned diatonically and Norwegian vocalists using Steve Reich-style phasing techniques.

The album features the Barnby Road Academy Chamber Choir, led by Lizzie Greeley, on three tracks, and vocals from Yamila Ríos on two others. Clark described the choir's contribution to the opening track "Spring But Dark" as a simple interval intended to function as an induction ritual, and envisioned the track's sound as a 1970s Werner Herzog film transformed by futuristic sound design. "Slap Drones" took its title from an idea in an Iain M. Banks novel, while "Catastrophe Anthem" employed what Clark described as non-human voices mixed across contrasting environments to balance corrosive and gentle qualities.

== Music ==
Reviewers characterised Death Peak as balancing cerebral sound design with dancefloor accessibility. Resident Advisor noted that the album contained some of Clark's most melodic dance tracks despite its title, comparing the euphoric sound of "Peak Magnetic" to Orbital. Clash described the record as industrial experimentalism informed by rave and hardcore influences, while highlighting the atmospheric use of human vocal elements throughout. The Quietus argued that "Spring But Dark" functioned as a microcosm of the entire album, with its interplay of childlike purity and darker techno elements.

"Living Fantasy" attracted particular attention, with Resident Advisor praising its blend of classical grandeur and post-rock dynamics. Clark described "Hoova" as marking the album's shift toward darker territory, influenced by Basic Channel's approach to single-chord composition.

== Critical reception ==
Professional ratings
Aggregate scores
Source	Rating
Metacritic	78/100
Review scores
Source	Rating
AllMusic	4/5 stars
The A.V. Club	B+
Clash	7/10
Exclaim!	8/10
Loud and Quiet	9/10
Paste	7.3/10
Pitchfork	7.4/10
PopMatters	7/10 stars
The Quietus	(favourable)
Resident Advisor	4.0/5

Death Peak received generally favourable reviews. At Metacritic, which assigns a weighted average score out of 100 to reviews from mainstream critics, the album received a score of 78 based on 13 reviews, indicating "generally favorable reviews".

Resident Advisor gave the album 4.0 out of 5, describing it as containing some of Clark's most accessible and melodic dancefloor tracks. Loud and Quiet awarded 9 out of 10, praising its "bizarre, profound (and not always entirely pleasant) impact". Exclaim! gave it 8 out of 10, and AllMusic's Heather Phares awarded four out of five stars.

Pitchfork's Brian Howe gave the album 7.4 out of 10, noting it was more accessible and entertaining than the preceding Clark (2014), though with less artistic weight. The Quietus argued the album surpassed the self-titled record, praising Clark's ability to create something new from the tension between contrasting textures. Clash named Death Peak the 33rd best album of 2017 in their year-end list.

== Live show ==
To accompany the album, Clark developed Death Peak Live, a touring show combining his electronic performances with contemporary dance choreographed by Melanie Lane. Lane, who had previously collaborated with Clark on dance projects including Tilted Fawn and Merge, choreographed, conceptualised and designed the costumes for the production. The choreography was developed over three weeks in Berlin with dancers Sophia Ndaba and Kianí Del Valle, alongside a light installation by London design studio Flat-E and lighting design by Brian Kelly. The hour-long show featured seven tracks with corresponding costume changes, presenting what Lane described as a sculptural narrative of androgynous, faceless "future bodies" that transformed throughout the performance using lights and costumes.

Clark described the creative partnership with Lane as allowing them to bypass formalities and work directly on the substance of the material. The production toured extensively between 2017 and 2019, performing at over 29 venues across 15 countries including festivals such as Sónar, Dekmantel, Pukkelpop and Latitude Festival, with its final documented performance at FFKT 2019 in Nagano, Japan.

Alongside the live tour, Warp Records released a Death Peak London Session video in 2017, a 17-minute performance featuring album tracks and improvisations.

== Track listing ==
All tracks are written by Christopher Stephen Clark.

No.	Title	Length
1.	"Spring But Dark"	1:18
2.	"Butterfly Prowler"	4:27
3.	"Peak Magnetic"	5:43
4.	"Hoova"	5:07
5.	"Slap Drones"	4:18
6.	"Aftermath"	2:01
7.	"Catastrophe Anthem"	6:35
8.	"Living Fantasy"	4:07
9.	"Un U.K."	9:56
Total length:		43:32

Japanese edition bonus track
No.	Title	Length
10.	"Licht" (Pink Strobe version)	7:19

== Personnel ==
Credits adapted from the liner notes of Death Peak.

Additional musicians

- Barnby Road Academy Chamber Choir – choir (tracks 1, 7, 9)
- Lizzie Greeley – choir leader (tracks 1, 7, 9)
- Yamila Ríos – vocals (tracks 6, 8)

Technical

- Christopher Stephen Clark – production, mastering
- Joel Krozer – additional mastering
- Naweed – additional mastering

Artwork

- Dominic Flannigan – design
- Alma Haser – illustration, photography

== Charts ==
Chart	Peak position
UK Dance Albums Chart	11
UK Independent Albums Chart	20
