= Lisey's Story (miniseries) =

2021 television miniseries

- Genre: Romantic drama; Psychological horror
- Based on: Lisey's Story by Stephen King
- Written by: Stephen King
- Directed by: Pablo Larraín
- Starring: Julianne Moore; Clive Owen; Jennifer Jason Leigh; Dane DeHaan; Joan Allen
- Composer: Clark
- Country of origin: United States
- Original language: English
- No. of episodes: 8

Production
- Executive producers: Juan De Dios Larraín; Ben Stephenson; Julianne Moore; Pablo Larraín; J. J. Abrams; Stephen King
- Producer: Andrew Balek
- Cinematography: Darius Khondji
- Editors: Cedric Nairn-Smith; Sebastián Sepúlveda
- Running time: 50–52 minutes
- Production companies: 60/40 Productions; Bad Robot Productions; Warner Bros. Television

Original release
- Network: Apple TV+
- Release: June 4 – July 16, 2021

Lisey's Story is an American psychological horror drama television miniseries based on the 2006 novel of the same name by Stephen King. The series is written by King, directed by Pablo Larraín, and produced by J. J. Abrams. Starring Julianne Moore and Clive Owen, Lisey's Story premiered on Apple TV+ on June 4, 2021.

== Premise ==
Still grieving the loss of her famous author husband, Scott Landon, who died two years prior, Lisa "Lisey" Landon finds herself besieged by those eager to get their hands on his unpublished manuscripts. While sorting through Scott's possessions, Lisey stumbles upon a cryptic treasure hunt that Scott meticulously crafted for her. This unexpected journey compels her to revisit their shared past, unearthing forgotten, even suppressed, memories of Scott's unusual abilities. As she pursues this scavenger hunt, Lisey unwittingly draws the attention of a dangerous stalker who believes she's selfishly keeping Scott's genius from the world.

== Cast ==
=== Main ===
- Julianne Moore as Lisa "Lisey" Landon née Debusher
- Clive Owen as Scott Landon
- Jennifer Jason Leigh as Darla Debusher
- Dane DeHaan as Jim Dooley
- Joan Allen as Amanda Debusher

=== Recurring ===
- Ron Cephas Jones as Prof. Roger Dashmiel
- Michael Pitt as Andrew Landon
- Omar Metwally as Dr. Hugh Alberness
- Sung Kang as Officer Dan Boeckman
- Peter Scolari as Dave Debusher
- Will Brill as Gerd Allen Cole

== Episodes ==
No.	Title	Directed by	Written by	Original release date
1	"Bool Hunt"	Pablo Larraín	Stephen King	June 4, 2021
Two years after beloved author Scott Landon's death, his widow Lisey is still grieving and constantly dreams of him. Scott has left Lisey a "bool hunt" for treasure that he wants her to find, the first clue being on the silver shovel that Lisey used to save Scott's life when he was shot at an event. Lisey's elder sister Amanda has a recurring bout of self-harm and falls into a near-catatonic state. Scott's second clue for the bool hunt is in Amanda's address book, which is also the contact information for a nursing home that Scott arranged for Amanda three years earlier. Lisey is pressured by Dashmiel, an academic fan of Scott's work, into handing over Scott's unpublished manuscripts, but she refuses. Dashmiel engages Jim Dooley, also a fan of Scott's, to pressure Lisey; he calls her home number and threatens her with violence. Strange events are shown in flashback: Scott momentarily disappears from his hospital room while the water is running in the bathroom, and Scott feeds Amanda water from his mouth that temporarily revives her mental state.
2	"Blood Bool"	Pablo Larraín	Stephen King	June 4, 2021
Lisey and Amanda's other sister, Darla, visit Amanda at the nursing home. Amanda sees herself in a world of a dark sky overlooking a sea, and talks about a childhood game she and her sisters used to play, where they were pirates on the ship Hollyhocks and sometimes had to be quiet to avoid the "long boy". Lisey calls Dashmiel to threaten him with the police; Dashmiel agrees to call off Dooley but is unable to reach him. Lisey remembers the night Scott proposed — they'd gotten into an argument after Scott sold his first book, and Scott cut his arm in window glass to remove a "blood bool" as an apology to Lisey. The memory helps Lisey find the third and fourth clues. Dooley breaks into Lisey's house, where he leaves a dead bird and a threatening letter. Darla and the police advise Lisey to move out for a while, but she insists on staying.
3	"Under the Yum-Yum Tree"	Pablo Larraín	Stephen King	June 11, 2021
Lisey finds the fifth clue, which has her reminiscing about her honeymoon with Scott. During their honeymoon, Scott told Lisey that he has visions that he writes about in his books, and shared with her about his family: his father, Andrew, and older brother, Paul. Andrew was violent; he cut them to remove blood bool, and warned them that though they can visit the "other place", they have to be cautious of demons. Scott grew up playing Paul's bool hunts. Scott took Lisey to the other place, but afterward Lisey said to never talk about it again. In the present, Amanda's mind is in the other place, and she sees Scott there. Amanda begs Lisey to help bring her back, but Lisey insists that the other place, Booya Moon, isn't real. Lisey learns about Dooley and his intense obsession with Scott's books. Dooley creates a distraction that draws the police away from Lisey's house, allowing him to break in.
4	"Jim Dandy"	Pablo Larraín	Stephen King	June 18, 2021
Dooley tortures Lisey and demands she hand over Scott's secret manuscripts by the following night, or he will kill her and her sisters. Her screams are heard by Amanda in Booya Moon. To Lisey's surprise, her injuries heal quickly, the way that Scott's did. Dooley breaks into Amanda's house to stay the night, and is narrowly missed by Darla, who goes there to pick up some things. Lisey has a vision of Scott, which triggers her repressed memories of when he took her to Booya Moon, a place where all people with imaginations can visit, and saw the gigantic long boy. Scott told Lisey that he and the long boy had a connection, and he feared that the long boy would one day keep him there. Lisey also recalls an incident when Scott mentally withdrew, and she went to Booya Moon with her natural ability to try bring him back.
5	"The Good Brother"	Pablo Larraín	Stephen King	June 25, 2021
When Scott was a child, Paul "got the bad" and went feral. Scott tried to take Paul to Booya Moon to heal in the pool, but Paul attacked him and Scott's father killed Paul. Scott buried Paul's body in Booya Moon. Years later, when Scott mentally withdrew, Lisey went to Booya Moon on her own and brought him back, which was the second time she saved his life. In the present, Lisey asks the vision of Scott why he'd make her remember all this, and she realizes that it's about Amanda, not Dooley. Lisey takes the silver shovel and leaves for Booya Moon to find Amanda. Dooley contacts Dashmiel, who tells him to stop harassing Lisey, but Dooley refuses.
6	"Now You Must Be Still"	Pablo Larraín	Stephen King	July 2, 2021
Lisey arrives in Booya Moon and dips in the pool to heal her wounds. She sees Scott, whom she doesn't approach, as well as Amanda, who confirms that she wants to be brought home. Lisey returns alone and recruits Darla, to whom she proves that Booya Moon is real and explains the whole situation. Lisey and Darla visit Amanda at the nursing home, where Lisey gives her the water from Booya Moon. Amanda is revived and discharged. The sisters agree to work together to trap and kill Dooley. Dooley listens to Lisey's staged voice message claiming that she's agreed to give him what he wants, but when Dooley stalks Lisey's house, he sees her healthy and laughing with her sisters.
7	"No Light, No Spark"	Pablo Larraín	Stephen King	July 9, 2021
In flashback, Scott is at a book reading when old injuries reappear on his body and he collapses. Scott is unable to go to the pool in Booya Moon to heal because the long boy keeps blocking his path. Lisey is with Scott when he dies at the hospital. In the present, Darla and Amanda arrive at Lisey's house and hide while Lisey waits for Dooley. When Dooley arrives he kills Officer Boeckman, who was watching the house, and shuts off the house's power. Lisey mocks Dooley as an overenthusiastic fan and he attacks her. The sisters fight Dooley, but he overpowers them and strangles Lisey. Lisey takes Dooley with her to Booya Moon, where she taunts him and calls for the long boy.
8	"Lisey’s Story"	Pablo Larraín	Stephen King	July 16, 2021
Lisey and Dooley fight. The long boy reveals itself to be made up of a mass of bodies, and it grabs Dooley and tears him apart. Lisey returns home and, since Dooley's remains are returned as well, disposes of him in a river. A search is made for Dooley for the murder of Officer Boeckman, but his boss Chief Richards suspects that Lisey killed Dooley and tacitly lets the issue go. In talking to Amanda, Lisey learns that some of the people at the Booya Moon pool are dead and just holding on for a little while longer. Lisey returns to Booya Moon and completes the bool hunt, finding her prize: a box that contains Scott's handwritten letter "Lisey's Story", which details how Scott's father deteriorated into paranoia and asked Scott to kill him. Scott also explains in the letter that the bool hunt's purpose was to help Lisey with Amanda, prepare her to handle dangerous fans like Dooley, and learn all of Scott's secrets so that she can move on. Lisey gives the silver shovel to the long boy in return for getting to see Scott one last time at the pool. She and Scott acknowledge their love for each other just before Scott disappears into the water.

== Production ==
=== Development ===
In August 2017, Stephen King expressed an interest in seeing his novel adapted as a television series: "Lisey's Story is my favorite of the books and I would love to see that done, especially now that there's a kind of openness on the streaming services on TV and even the cable networks. There's more freedom to do stuff now and when you do a movie from a book, there's this thing that I call the sitting on a suitcase syndrome. That is where you try to pack in all the clothes at once and the suitcase won't close. So it's tough to take a book that is fully textured, and do it in two hours and 10 minutes. But as a TV show you have 10 hours."

In April 2019, it was announced that Apple Inc. had acquired the rights to the novel and gave it an eight-episode straight-to-series order to air on Apple TV+, with all episodes scripted by King, to be produced by J. J. Abrams and Bad Robot Productions. In August 2019, Pablo Larraín had signed on to direct the miniseries. Working with Production Designer Guy Hendrix Dyas, a unique visual style was created, blending the real world with the fantastical elements in Stephen King's novel. Together they also designed "The Long Boy", a terrifying creature which is a prime example of the miniseries merging of horror and surrealism.

In February 2020, it was announced that Darius Khondji had joined the series as cinematographer.

=== Casting ===
Julianne Moore was cast in the leading role of Lisey. In October 2019, Clive Owen was added to the cast, with Joan Allen and Dane DeHaan joining in November, and Sung Kang joining in December. In January 2020, Jennifer Jason Leigh was revealed to be in the cast. When Apple announced a first look of Lisey's Story in February 2021, it was also revealed that Ron Cephas Jones was in the cast.

=== Filming ===
Filming began in October 2019 at the historic Van Liew-Suydam House in Franklin Township, Somerset County, New Jersey. In December 2019, filming took place in the village of Tuckahoe in Westchester County, New York. In mid-March 2020, filming was shut down due to the COVID-19 pandemic. Larraín said that "a few weeks" of shooting were left before the shutdown occurred. In September 2020, Julianne Moore shared that filming for her character was complete.

=== Music ===
The score was composed by British electronic musician Clark. Director Pablo Larraín heard Clark's Daniel Isn't Real soundtrack (2019) and contacted him directly to score the series. Larraín wanted emotional themes tied to individual characters rather than functional backdrop music; Clark described needing to "climb inside the interior world of the characters". The score was recorded with a 30-piece string ensemble at AIR Studios and a 30-piece choir at Abbey Road Studios, with violinist Rakhi Singh performing on the main title theme. The Long Boy creature's vocal sound was created by the choir using percussive vocal techniques; Larraín wanted the voice to be "believably human" rather than theatrical.

The soundtrack album was released on 25 June 2021 on WaterTower Music and Loud Robot.

== Release ==
On January 6, 2021, Apple announced that Lisey's Story would premiere in 2021. The following month, Apple revealed a first look of the series, where it was announced that Lisey's Story would have a mid-2021 premiere. In a first look with Vanity Fair in April 2021, it was announced that Lisey's Story will premiere on Apple TV+ with the first two episodes released on June 4, 2021, and new episodes each Friday thereafter. On May 11, 2021, Apple released a trailer for the miniseries. On June 4, 2021, the series debuted on Apple TV+ with the release of the first two episodes.

== Reception ==
=== Critical response ===
On the review aggregator Rotten Tomatoes, Lisey's Story holds an approval rating of 53% based on 74 reviews, with an average rating of 6.00/10. The website's critics consensus reads, "Despite an admirable performance from Julianne Moore, Lisey's Story is weighed down by an overreliance on its source material and a sluggish pace." On Metacritic, which uses a weighted average, the miniseries has a score of 49 out of 100 based on 26 reviews, indicating "mixed or average" reviews.

=== Accolades ===
Year	Award	Category	Nominee(s)	Result	Ref.
2022	Visual Effects Society Awards	Outstanding Animated Character in an Episode or Real-Time Project	Mohsen Mousavi, Salauddin "Sallu" Kazi, Mattias Brunosson, and Pablovsky Ramos-Nieves (for "The Long Boy")	Nominated	
2022	Primetime Creative Arts Emmy Awards	Outstanding Main Title Design	Karin Fong, Osbert Parker, Henry Chang, Merrill Hall, Russ Gautier, and Lexi Gunvaldson	Nominated	
