= Daniel Isn't Real (soundtrack) =

2019 soundtrack album by Clark

Soundtrack album by Clark
- Released: 6 December 2019
- Recorded: 2019
- Studio: East Connection Studio 22, Budapest
- Genre: Film score; electronic; modern classical
- Length: 56:06
- Label: Deutsche Grammophon
- Producer: Clark

Clark chronology
Kiri Variations (2019)	Daniel Isn't Real (2019)	Playground in a Lake (2021)

Daniel Isn't Real is a soundtrack album by British electronic musician Clark, released on 6 December 2019 on Deutsche Grammophon. It is the original score for the psychological horror film Daniel Isn't Real (2019), directed by Adam Egypt Mortimer, produced by SpectreVision and starring Patrick Schwarzenegger and Miles Robbins. The album was Clark's first release on Deutsche Grammophon and his first feature film score.

== Background ==
The film, based on Brian DeLeeuw's novel In This Way I Was Saved, follows Luke, a troubled college student who resurrects his childhood imaginary friend with dangerous consequences. It premiered at South by Southwest in March 2019 and was released theatrically on 6 December 2019 by Samuel Goldwyn Films.

Clark had previously scored television series including The Last Panthers (2015), Rellik (2017) and Kiri (2018), but Daniel Isn't Real was his first commission for a feature film. He described the project as "particularly rewarding scoring Luke, clambering inside the electric majesty of his slowly dissolving mind", adding that "new pathways into forging electronics with orchestra can be found here".

The score features the Budapest Art Orchestra string ensemble, conducted by Pejtsik Péter and recorded at East Connection Studio 22 in Budapest, with orchestrations by Finn McNicholas. Clark later described it as "the first time I'd ever recorded strings and those tracks on the album are the ones that worked". Director Pablo Larraín subsequently heard the soundtrack and approached Clark directly to compose the score for Lisey's Story (2021).

=== Expanded edition ===
An expanded edition was released digitally on 9 October 2020 on Deutsche Grammophon, adding three bonus tracks: "Isolation Theme (Thom Yorke Remix)", "Creel Etude" and "Amor (C.B. Rework)". Thom Yorke's remix of "Isolation Theme" arose from a reciprocal exchange: Clark had previously remixed Yorke's "Not the News" from Anima (2019). Yorke said the remix was inspired by the pandemic, describing it as reflecting "being told to stay indoors, entering a new type of silence".

== Critical reception ==
Professional ratings
Review scores
Source	Rating
Mojo	4/5 stars

Electronic Sound called the score "deliciously degraded". Headphone Commute gave the album a positive review, calling it "textural, organic, and incredibly dynamic" and describing it as "a tense and anxiety-driven affair" befitting the film's depiction of psychotic violence. The reviewer praised the variations on a single theme throughout the album, noting its cohesive structure reminiscent of classical form rather than a collection of discrete cues.

== Track listing ==
No.	Title	Length
1.	"Luke Entering"	0:46
2.	"Spiral Crackerjack"	4:02
3.	"You're Pulling My Face Off"	3:04
4.	"I'm Pulling My Face Off"	3:14
5.	"Tickling a Nutter"	1:18
6.	"Volatile"	4:11
7.	"Realm Promo"	2:57
8.	"Cassie Falling"	1:23
9.	"Diamond Body"	3:28
10.	"Mumanguish"	0:58
11.	"Snowflake Banger"	2:32
12.	"Experts in Light"	2:52
13.	"Isolation Theme (Thigpen)"	3:52
14.	"Isolation Theme 2"	3:59
15.	"Amor"	3:52
16.	"Abyss Thick and Wide"	4:58
17.	"Luke Falling"	8:40
Total length:		56:06

Expanded edition bonus tracks
No.	Title	Length
18.	"Isolation Theme (Thom Yorke Remix)"	4:09
19.	"Creel Etude"	2:52
20.	"Amor (C.B. Rework)"	4:09

== Personnel ==
Credits adapted from liner notes.

- Clark – composer, producer, performer, recording engineer, mixer
- Budapest Art Orchestra – strings
- Pejtsik Péter – conductor
- Finn McNicholas – orchestrations
- Mária Reháková – flute
- Gábor Buczko – orchestra recording engineer
- Miklós Lukács Sr. – orchestra recording engineer
