= Jasmin Kent Rodgman =

- Origin: Manchester, England
- Genres: Classical, experimental
- Occupation: Composer
- Instruments: Piano; Violin
- Years active: 2011–present
- Label: NMC Recordings
- Member of: Manchester Collective
- Website: https://www.jkr-music.com/

Jasmin Kent Rodgman is a British–Malaysian composer based in London. She is the current Co-Artistic Director of the contemporary music ensemble Manchester Collective.

== Education and career ==
Rodgman studied music composition at the University of Manchester receiving a BMus and MMus.

In 2018 she was appointed as a British Council + PRS Foundation Musician-in-Residence: China, where she lived and composed in Lanzhou, China. In 2018 she was also selected as a Jerwood Composer for the London Symphony Orchestra. Her piece Idol Lost was performed by the orchestra later on October 6, 2018.

She has scored numerous theatre productions including Olivier Award-nominated Paradise Now! (Bush Theatre), Julius Caesar (Royal Shakespeare Company) and Titus Andronicus (Shakespeare's Globe Theatre).

Rodgman is active in music for film, having worked on Prisoner C33 and Harm which were both produced by the BBC.

She first worked with Manchester Collective composing the piece four-person simulation to be performed alongside Steve Reich's Different Trains. On June 12, 2024, she was announced as the Co-Artistic Director of Manchester Collective.

In July 2025, Rodgman collaborated with singer-songwriter John Grant to compose the score for the Royal Ballet's production of A Single Man.

She releases music under the classical music label NMC Recordings.
