= Phoenix Central Park =

Performing arts venue and private art gallery in New South Wales, Australia

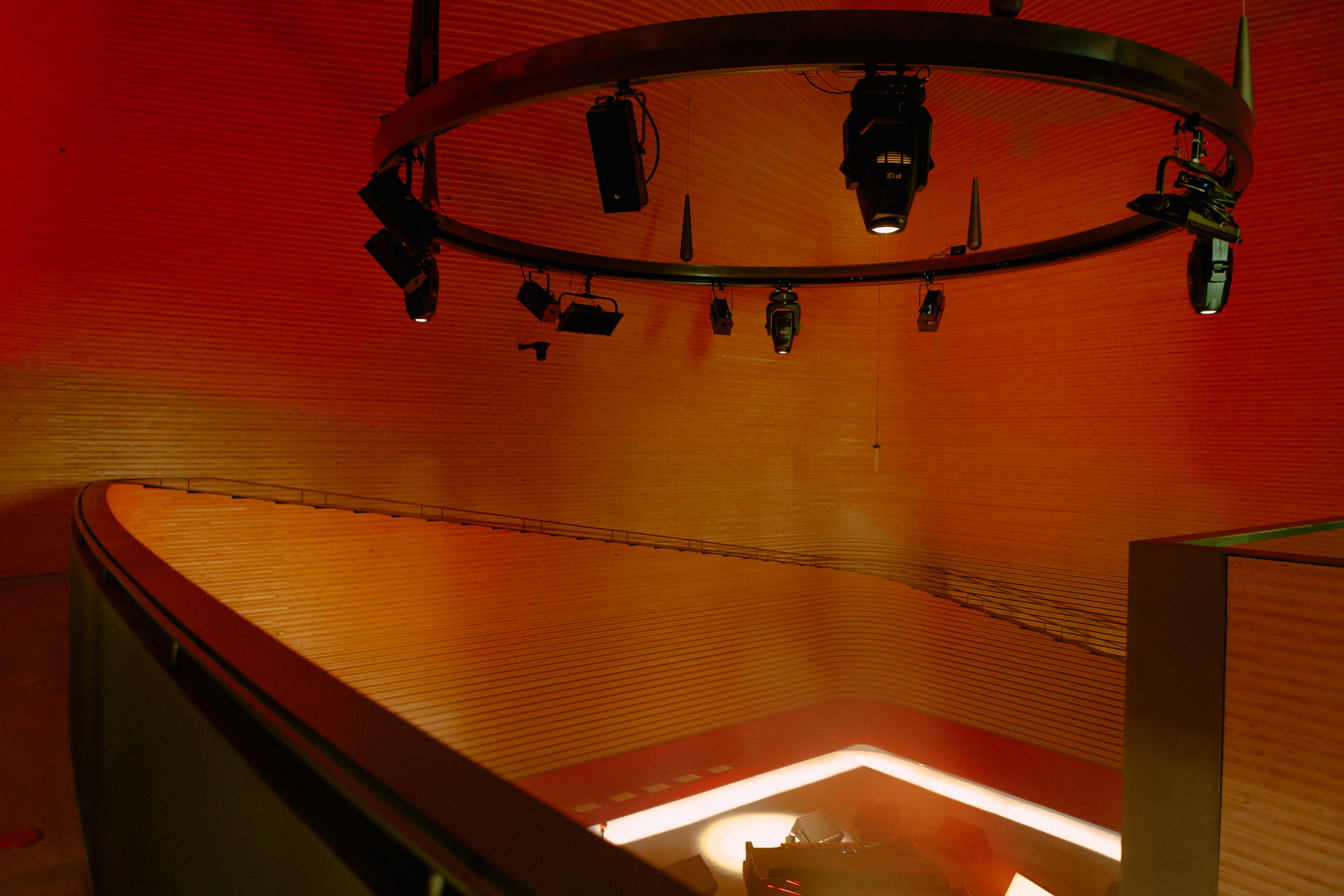
- Interior of Phoenix Central Park
- Full name: Phoenix Central Park
- Address: 37–49 O'Connor Street; Chippendale; Australia
- Owner: Judith Neilson
- Capacity: 150

Construction
- Opened: 2020
- Years active: 2020–present
- Architect: Durbach Block Jaggers John Wardle Architects

Website
- Venue Website

Phoenix Central Park is a performing arts venue and private art gallery located at 37–49 O'Connor Street, Chippendale, New South Wales, Australia. The location is within the Chippendale Heritage Conservation Area, item C9 on Schedule 5 of the Sydney Environmental Plan 2012. The site is also within the Chippendale Locality as described in Section 2.3.1 of the Sydney Development Control Plan 2012.

== History of the site ==
=== Establishment of the suburb and street ===
Between 1788 and 1824 the area south of Sydney town was devoted to farming relying on water from Blackwattle Swamp Creek and brick and tile manufacture based on the local clay. Land to the south of the subject site was granted to William Chippendale in 1815, and in 1825 Governor Brisbane granted land bounding onto Parramatta Road to the pardoned convict Robert Cooper, a onetime London distiller, who built the Brisbane Distillery there. The southern part of Cooper's grant, including the subject site, remained as grazing land until the 1840s, when Cooper built workers’ housing including a row of over fifty cottages known as Cooper's Row, an early element in Chippendale's street layout and effectively today's O'Connor Street.

=== Residential evolution of the site ===
The two-room timber and shingle houses making up Cooper's Row were of notoriously poor quality: The Sydney Morning Herald of March 8, 1851 suggested that "the tenants will awake some morning with a weightier covering on them than the bed-clothes". They were demolished in the 1850s following acquisition by the recently arrived English businessman Clark Irving. Irving with carpenter Peter Royal built "fourteen cottages and one public house" on the site, naming the houses Adelaide Terrace after Irving's wife, with Royal himself occupying what later became 37 O'Connor Street. In 1861 the houses were described as two-storey brick, slate-roofed buildings with four rooms; by 1863 a fifth room, probably a kitchen, had been added. Tenants included Miss Meta Mantle's ladies' school, James Carroll, a solicitor, and Ebenezer Dibley, a bricklayer.

In 1873 the terrace and adjacent hotel were purchased by Bernhardt Holtermann, an immigrant gold miner, merchant and member of parliament. Renamed Holtermann's Terrace, the houses, featuring verandas with concave iron roofs and shuttered French windows, were auctioned in 1876, when they were described in the Sydney Morning Herald as "repaired, painted, decorated and made equal to new ... in a populous and improving part of the city". By 1881 the terrace had become 37–49 O'Connor Street, named for the City of Sydney alderman Daniel O'Connor. The terrace and corner hotel were acquired by Tooth & Co. Ltd as part of their hotel holdings, and sold in 1920, by which time the slate roofs had been replaced with corrugated iron.

== Small industry and the influence of war ==
In 1938 the terrace was acquired by John Henry McEvoy, a boot manufacturer, who had established Fostar's Shoe Factory at the corner of O'Connor and Balfour Streets in 1929. Reputedly the largest shoe manufacturer in Australia, Fostar's used its own airplane for interstate distribution and in 1941–42 won a government contract to produce army boots. The National Emergency Act of 1941 required certain military-related companies to provide ‘an air raid shelter, amenities, equipment and training among other protective measures in the event of an air raid’, and the site was put to this purpose. The old houses were demolished and the new building constructed in 1942, providing a ground floor collection area, including a canteen, and a basement shelter capable of sheltering Fostar's 800 employees. Despite legal controversies over its army contract and McEvoy's death in 1945 the company continued to prosper into the 1950s. The building was acquired by HM Property Development Co. Pty Ltd in 1968 and, following modification, tenanted by a martial arts academy, a dance studio and a gymnasium. In 2013 the building was extensively damaged by fire.

== Performing arts venue and gallery ==
In 2014, construction began on a performing arts venue and gallery on the damaged site. The project was a collaboration between John Wardle Architects (gallery) and Durbach Block Jaggers (performance space), commissioned by Judith Neilson. The building was completed in 2019.

The performing arts venue has been open to the public since 2022, with Beau Neilson serving as its creative director and executive producer. The venue is philanthropically funded by Judith, and is a registered charity. Performances at the venue are free, with tickets allocated through a ballot system. Notable performances at the venue include Courtney Barnett, Sampa The Great, Genesis Owusu, Alexis Taylor, Mike Nock, DOMi & JD BECK, Gordi, Astrid Sonne, Lydia Lunch, Kelly Lee Owens, Nabihah Iqbal, Clark, Tim Hecker, serpentwithfeet, Actress and John Carroll Kirby.

The venue has also presented original commissions, including the world premiere of Mountain (November 2023), a contemporary dance and live music work by Clark and choreographer Melanie Lane, featuring the Canberra Symphony Orchestra Chamber Ensemble and costumes by Akira Isogawa.

== Associations with notable people ==
Robert Cooper was a London distiller. Found guilty of receiving stolen goods, he was transported to Australia in 1813 and pardoned in 1818. Cooper entered into a variety of sometimes questionable business dealings, appearing as both litigant and defendant in court reports. Granted land at what is now the southeast corner of City Road and Parramatta Road in 1825, he built the Brisbane Distillery soon after. By the 1840s he had built a range of workers' housing on his land, including a row of over fifty cottages known as Cooper's Row. Cooper became insolvent by 1850.

Clark Irving arrived from England in the early 1840s, became manager of the Australasian Sugar Company among other business roles and was one of a group associated with the Colonial Sugar Refinery who acquired Cooper's property, including the distillery and the subject site, in 1852. In 1857 he and the carpenter Peter Royal demolished part of Cooper's Row and built a group of terrace houses on the subject site, which he named Adelaide Terrace after his wife, and an adjacent corner hotel. Irving went on to become a significant grazier and member of parliament.

Bernhard Holtermann arrived from Germany in 1858, became a "gold miner, merchant and member of parliament and is significant for his role in promoting photography", partly as a means of encouraging migration to Australia. He acquired and renovated the Terrace and hotel in 1873, renamed them Holtermann's Terrace and Holtermann's Family Hotel, and may have commissioned the photograph of his property, included in the Appendix to this report, taken at that time. Holtermann sold the terrace and hotel in 1876. Crawford H MacKellar, who designed the existing building for Fostar's Shoes, arrived from Scotland in 1906 and practised as an architect, designing prominent buildings including the Woolworths Building in Darlinghurst Road, the David Jones Department Store and the Gowings Building in central Sydney.

Fostar's Shoes, established near the subject site in O'Connor Street in 1929, was reputedly the largest shoe manufacturer in Australia, with stores across the country, 800 employees at its Chippendale factories alone and a company airplane for interstate distribution. The company was contracted to supply army boots during World War II and, despite some ensuing legal controversy, remained an Australian household name into the 1950s.

== Sources ==
- Australian Heritage Commission, Australian Historic Themes, Commonwealth of Australia, 2001
- Casey & Lowe Pty Ltd, Archaeological Assessment, 37-49 O’Connor Street, Chippendale, October 2015
- City of Sydney, Development Control Plan 2012
- City of Sydney, Local Environmental Plan 2012
- ICOMOS Australia, The Burra Charter: The Australia ICOMOS Charter for the Conservation of Places of Cultural Significance (Burra Charter), Australia ICOMOS, 2013
- ICOMOS International Scientific Committee on Interpretation and Presentation, The ICOMOS Charter for the Interpretation and Presentation of Cultural Heritage Sites Proposed Final Draft, Ename ICOMOS, 2007
- Heritage Council of NSW, Heritage Interpretation Policy, August 2005
- NSW Heritage Council, New South Wales Historical Themes, 4 October 2001
- NSW Heritage Office and Department of Infrastructure Planning and Natural Resources, NSW Heritage Manual, Sydney 2001
- NSW Heritage Office, Interpreting Heritage Places and Items Guidelines, NSW Heritage Office, 2005
