= Kiri (TV series) =

British television crime drama miniseries

- Promotional image featuring Sarah Lancashire
- Genre: Crime; Drama; Mystery
- Written by: Jack Thorne
- Directed by: Euros Lyn
- Starring: Sarah Lancashire
- Composer: Clark
- Country of origin: United Kingdom
- Original language: English
- No. of episodes: 4

Production
- Cinematography: Matt Gray
- Production company: The Forge

Original release
- Network: Channel 4 Acorn TV
- Release: 10 January – 31 January 2018

Kiri is a four-part British television crime drama miniseries written by Jack Thorne and directed by Euros Lyn, starring Sarah Lancashire as a social worker whose decision leads to the abduction and death of a child in her care. It aired on Channel 4 from 10 to 31 January 2018. The series was Channel 4's biggest drama launch in over two years and became the most-watched drama on the All 4 streaming service.

== Plot ==
The series is set in Bristol. It centres on the abduction of Kiri Akindele (Felicia Mukasa), a nine-year-old black girl. Kiri lives with her foster parents Jim and Alice Warner (Steven Mackintosh and Lia Williams) and their teenage son Simon (Finn Bennett). The Warners are a middle-class white couple who fostered her at age four and are about to adopt her. Miriam Grayson (Sarah Lancashire) is a disorganised middle-aged social worker. Kiri is in her care. Her boss is Julie Burnett (Claire Rushbrook). Kiri has been taken to the house of her paternal grandfather Tobi Akindele (Lucian Msamati) and his second wife for supervised visits once a month by Miriam, who has been investigated in relation to previous cases in which her decisions have resulted in negative outcomes. Kiri's father is 28-year-old Nathanial (Paapa Essiedu). He is a violent, drug dealing ex-convict from Peckham, London who has a history of grievous bodily harm and is not allowed to have contact with Kiri.

== Cast and characters ==
- Felicia Mukasa as Kiri Akindele, a girl aged 9 who disappears in the first episode
- Sarah Lancashire as Miriam Grayson, a social worker caring for Kiri
- Lucian Msamati as Tobi Akindele, Kiri's grandfather
- Andi Osho as Rochelle Akindele, Tobi's second wife
- Paapa Essiedu as Nathaniel Akindele, Kiri's father
- Wunmi Mosaku as Detective Inspector Vanessa Mercer, police officer leading the investigation into Kiri's disappearance
- Lia Williams as Alice Warner, Kiri's foster-mother and prospective adoptive mother
- Steven Mackintosh as Jim Warner, Kiri's foster-father and prospective adoptive father
- Finn Bennett as Simon Warner, son of Alice and Jim
- Claire Rushbrook as Julie Burnett, Miriam's boss
- Cara Theobold as Lucy Maxwell, a younger social worker who Miriam has mentored
- Sue Johnston as Celia Grayson, Miriam's elderly mother

== Episodes ==
No.	Title	Directed by	Written by	Original release date	UK viewers (millions)
1	"Episode 1"	Euros Lyn	Jack Thorne	10 January 2018	3.2
Miriam decides to grant Tobi an unsupervised visit with Kiri. After Miriam takes Kiri to Tobi, Kiri goes missing. During a police search, Kiri's strangled corpse is found on Bristol Downs. Nathanial is missing and is being sought by police, who suspect him of abducting and killing her. The media covers the case prominently, and approach Miriam when they find out about her role in it. She is questioned by her superiors, who suspend her. Tobi is taken to the mortuary by a detective to identify Kiri's body.
2	"Episode 2"	Euros Lyn	Jack Thorne & Rachel De-lahay	17 January 2018	N/A
Searching for Nathanial, Tobi finds him in a brothel. Nathanial tells Tobi that he did not kill Kiri. Tobi tells the Warners that he wants to arrange the funeral with them and to bury her in a churchyard with a Christian service. They object because they are atheists. Simon also becomes a suspect. Miriam tells the press that she did the right thing for Kiri.
3	"Episode 3"	Euros Lyn	Jack Thorne	24 January 2018	N/A
The police arrest Nathanial at Tobi's house. It is discovered that after Nathanial abducted Kiri, they became separated. Simon lied about where he was on the day of the abduction, and the Warners suspect that Simon killed her.
4	"Episode 4"	Euros Lyn	Jack Thorne	31 January 2018	N/A
Nathanial is charged with murdering Kiri. Simon accuses Jim of killing her. Jim denies having anything to do with it, then eventually as he gets increasingly emotional, confesses, admitting that he was with her on the day – she ran away and fell accidentally and hit her head on a rock.

== Music ==
The score was composed by British electronic musician Clark, his second television commission after The Last Panthers (2015), also written by Jack Thorne. Clark recorded with cellists Oliver Coates and Audun Andre Sandvik, viola player Nora Taksdal, and the Barnby Road Academy Chamber Choir, combining acoustic instruments with electronics and field recordings. He described the score's character as "plaintive beauty, eerie wyrd arcadian horror and childlike outsider music". Director Euros Lyn used only a small portion of the music Clark recorded, employing it sparingly throughout the drama.

Clark subsequently reworked and expanded the unused material into the standalone album Kiri Variations, released on 26 July 2019 on his own Throttle Records label, describing the television commission as "a prominent spark for new approaches".

== Reception ==
The premiere episode drew 3.2 million viewers, making it Channel 4's biggest drama launch in over two years. Across the series, Kiri averaged 4.9 million viewers with an 18.7% audience share including catch-up viewing, and became the most-watched drama on All 4.

The series was well received by television critics. However, it attracted criticism from some social workers, who perceived the programme as having a negative portrayal of their profession and said that an incompetent rule-breaker such as Miriam would not have kept her job for as long.
