= Turning Dragon =

Studio album by Clark
- Released: 28 January 2008
- Genre: IDM; electronic; techno
- Length: 46:35
- Label: Warp Records
- Producer: Clark

Clark chronology
Body Riddle (2006)	Turning Dragon (2008)	Totems Flare (2009)

Turning Dragon is the fourth studio album by British electronic musician Clark, released on 28 January 2008 on Warp Records. Recorded in Clark's Berlin apartment following his relocation to the city, the album represents a deliberate departure from the organic textures and acoustic elements of Body Riddle (2006), moving toward aggressive, mechanised techno. Clark himself described it as a "techno album".

Turning Dragon received positive reviews from music critics, with Pitchfork awarding it 8.2 out of 10 and Drowned in Sound giving 8 out of 10.

== Background ==
Following the release of Body Riddle in 2006, Clark relocated to Berlin. Turning Dragon was recorded in his Berlin apartment, and the album was shaped by his experience touring continental rave venues. Rather than a linear progression from its predecessor, Clark described the album as a return to earlier creative impulses, pivoting away from the layered, organic aesthetic of Body Riddle toward a more mechanised, dancefloor-oriented sound.

The album incorporates processed acoustic sounds, gritty electronics, and environmental noises, with a production approach influenced by the minimal, claustrophobic arrangements associated with Berlin's techno scene. Clark also drew on elements of hip hop and 1980s funk, weaving samples into tracks that shift unexpectedly between techno, noise, and ambient passages. The packaging featured abstract artwork and cryptic track titles.

== Critical reception ==
Professional ratings
Review scores
Source	Rating
AllMusic	3.5/5 stars
Drowned in Sound	8/10
The Milk Factory	4.4/5
Pitchfork	8.2/10
Resident Advisor	4.0/5

Turning Dragon received positive reviews from music critics. Pitchfork gave the album 8.2 out of 10 and described it as "visceral take on the art of modern beatmaking". Mike Diver of Drowned in Sound awarded 8 out of 10, describing the album as a "violent rebirth" and emphasising its rawness and physicality, while noting that the stylistic shift from Body Riddle would prove divisive among listeners.

The Milk Factory rated the album 4.4 out of 5, calling it Clark's "most immediate record" and praising its dancefloor-oriented energy and sharp, angular production. Resident Advisor's James Glazebrook characterised it as "intelligent music that short circuits the brain", highlighting the album's ability to function simultaneously as cerebral listening and physical dancefloor material. Tim O'Neil of PopMatters reviewed the album favourably, drawing parallels between Clark's directional shift and similar developments in electronic music at the time.

Across reviews, critics emphasised the Berlin influence on the album's sound, with Clark's relocation and rave touring cited as catalysts for the shift toward mechanised techno.

== Track listing ==
All tracks are written by Christopher Stephen Clark.

No.	Title	Length
1.	"New Year Storm"	4:05
2.	"Volcan Veins"	4:05
3.	"Truncation Horn"	2:19
4.	"For Wolves Crew"	6:59
5.	"Violenl"	3:42
6.	"Gaskarth/Cyrk Dedication"	4:53
7.	"Ache of the North"	5:09
8.	"Mercy Sines"	3:17
9.	"Hot May Slides"	2:46
10.	"Beg"	4:13
11.	"Penultimate Persian"	5:01
Total length:		46:35
