= In Camera (film) =

- Official poster
- Directed by: Naqqash Khalid
- Written by: Naqqash Khalid
- Produced by: Juliette Larthe; Mary Burke
- Starring: Nabhaan Rizwan; Amir El-Masry; Rory Fleck Byrne
- Cinematography: Tasha Back
- Edited by: Ricardo Saraiva
- Music by: Clark
- Production companies: BBC Film; BFI; Uncommon Creative Studios; Prettybird; Public Dreams
- Distributed by: Conic
- Release dates: 1 July 2023 (Karlovy Vary); 13 September 2024
- Running time: 95 minutes
- Country: United Kingdom
- Language: English

In Camera is a 2023 British drama film, written and directed by Naqqash Khalid, in his directorial debut. It stars Nabhaan Rizwan, Amir El-Masry and Rory Fleck Byrne.

It had its world premiere at the Karlovy Vary International Film Festival on 1 July 2023, and was released on 13 September 2024, by Conic.

== Premise ==
A young actor finds himself in a cycle of nightmarish auditions. After repeatedly being rejected, he takes it upon himself to find a part to play.

== Cast ==
- Nabhaan Rizwan as Aden
- Amir El-Masry as Conrad
- Rory Fleck Byrne as Bo
- Aston McAuley as Lead Actor
- Josie Walker as Joanna
- Antonio Aakeel as Actor That Books Everything
- Shahid Ahmed as Uber Driver / Indie Film Dad
- Jamie Ballard as Husband
- Gana Bayarsaikhan as Photographer
- Clare Burt as Acting Teacher
- Sarah-Jane Potts as Casting Director
- Hussina Raja as Production Assistant

== Production ==
In September 2022, it was announced Nabhaan Rizwan, Amir El-Masry and Rory Fleck Byrne had joined the cast of the film, with Naqqash Khalid directing from a screenplay he wrote.

== Music ==
The film's score was composed by British electronic musician Clark. Director Naqqash Khalid wanted the music to function as "a whole new layer of storytelling ... in a dialogue and dance with the images and characters on-screen", describing the finished work as "another character in the film". Clark described using his own vocals "abstracted in a way that tonally matched the film" as the score's most distinctive challenge.

A standalone soundtrack album, also titled In Camera, was released on Clark's Throttle Records label on 13 September 2024. The 20-track album expands on the original film score with newly written material, and includes a cover of the Carpenters' "Superstar". It features saxophone by John Dunk and guitar by Finn McNicholas, and was mastered by Cicely Balston at Air Studios.

== Release ==
The film had its world premiere at the Karlovy Vary International Film Festival on 1 July 2023. It also screened at Zurich Film Festival on 2 October 2023, and the BFI London Film Festival on 13 October 2023. In February 2024, Conic acquired UK distribution rights to the film. It was released on 13 September 2024.

== Reception ==
On the review aggregator website Rotten Tomatoes, 100% of 19 critics' reviews are positive, with an average rating of 6.8/10. Metacritic, which uses a weighted average, assigned the film a score of 70 out of 100, based on four critics, indicating "generally favorable" reviews.
