= Playground in a Lake =

Studio album by Clark
- Released: 26 March 2021
- Recorded: 2019–2020
- Studio: East Connection Studio 22, Budapest; Brighton; Berlin
- Genre: Electronic; ambient; contemporary classical
- Length: 62:31
- Label: Deutsche Grammophon
- Producer: Clark

Clark chronology
Daniel Isn't Real (2019)	Playground in a Lake (2021)	Lisey's Story (2021)

Playground in a Lake is the ninth studio album by British electronic musician Clark, released on 26 March 2021 via Deutsche Grammophon. It is Clark's first studio album release on the label. The album features orchestral contributions from the Budapest Art Orchestra, Scoring Berlin, cellist Oliver Coates, violinist Rakhi Singh of the Manchester Collective, and double bassist Yair Elazar Glotman, among others. The album received generally favourable reviews, with an aggregate score of 77 out of 100 on Metacritic.

== Background ==
Clark spent over five years making Playground in a Lake, having conceived the idea of combining his electronic production with orchestral instrumentation as far back as 2014. For the project, he taught himself to read and write sheet music, having been entirely self-taught as a musician up to that point.

Clark described the album as an "extinction myth" dealing broadly with climate change told in mythological terms, exploring themes of the last human on Earth, betrayal of an innocent child, and loss of innocence. He cited the philosophers Eugene Thacker and Ernest Becker as influences on the album's conceptual framework.

Orchestral parts were recorded with the Budapest Art Orchestra at East Connection Studio 22 in Budapest in December 2019, and with Scoring Berlin in Berlin, with arrangements by Tom Hodge. Other contributions were recorded in Brighton, including sessions with twelve-year-old chorister Nathaniel Timoney, who was directed via Zoom during COVID-19 pandemic lockdown restrictions. AFRODEUTSCHE (Henrietta Smith-Rolla) contributed vocals remotely through file exchanges.

The album was performed live for the first time on 16 October 2021 at the Barbican Hall in London, with Clark performing alongside the London Contemporary Orchestra conducted by Robert Ames and led by Rakhi Singh.

== Critical reception ==
Professional ratings
Aggregate scores
Source	Rating
Metacritic	77/100
Review scores
Source	Rating
AllMusic	4/5 stars
Mojo	4/5 stars
Loud and Quiet	6/10
MusicOMH	4/5 stars
Pitchfork	6.1/10
[sic] Magazine	9/10
The Line of Best Fit	7/10
Uncut	9/10

Playground in a Lake received generally favourable reviews. Steven Johnson of musicOMH called it "an adventurous collision of different musical worlds". Uncut gave it 9 out of 10, and Brett Spaceman of [sic] Magazine also awarded 9 out of 10, comparing it to the work of Max Richter and Michael Nyman. Heather Phares of AllMusic described the album as "haunting and expertly crafted".

Pitchfork gave the album 6.1 out of 10. Woody Delaney of Loud and Quiet praised individual moments but felt the album was too sprawling for casual listeners, awarding 6 out of 10.

== Track listing ==
Playground in a Lake
No.	Title	Length
1.	"Lovelock"	1:40
2.	"Lambent Rag"	3:24
3.	"Citrus"	2:34
4.	"Forever Chemicals"	3:43
5.	"More Islands"	4:32
6.	"Small"	2:24
7.	"Disguised Foundation"	3:23
8.	"Suspension Reservoir"	2:06
9.	"Entropy Polychord"	4:20
10.	"Aura Nera"	3:54
11.	"Already Ghosts"	2:29
12.	"Earth Systems"	4:41
13.	"Emissary"	3:47
14.	"Comfort and Fear"	2:50
15.	"Shut You Down"	5:49
16.	"Life Outro"	10:55
Total length:		62:31

== Personnel ==
Credits adapted from liner notes.

- Clark – composer, producer, mixer, recording engineer, synthesizer, piano, Disklavier, cello, vocals
- Oliver Coates – cello
- Rakhi Singh – violin, viola
- Budapest Art Orchestra – strings
- Peter Pejtsik – conductor
- Scoring Berlin – string ensemble
- Chris Taylor (CANT) – clarinet
- Yair Elazar Glotman – double bass
- Lauren Scott – harp
- Sam Ewens – French horn, trumpet
- Yamila Rios – cello
- Nathaniel Timoney – vocals
- Kieran Brunt – vocals
- Henrietta Smith-Rolla (AFRODEUTSCHE) – backing vocals
- Tom Hodge – arranger
- Francesco Donadello – mixing engineer
- Götz-Michael Rieth – mastering engineer
- Jonathan Zawada – artwork
