= Clark (musician) =

English electronic musician (born 1979)

Chris Clark
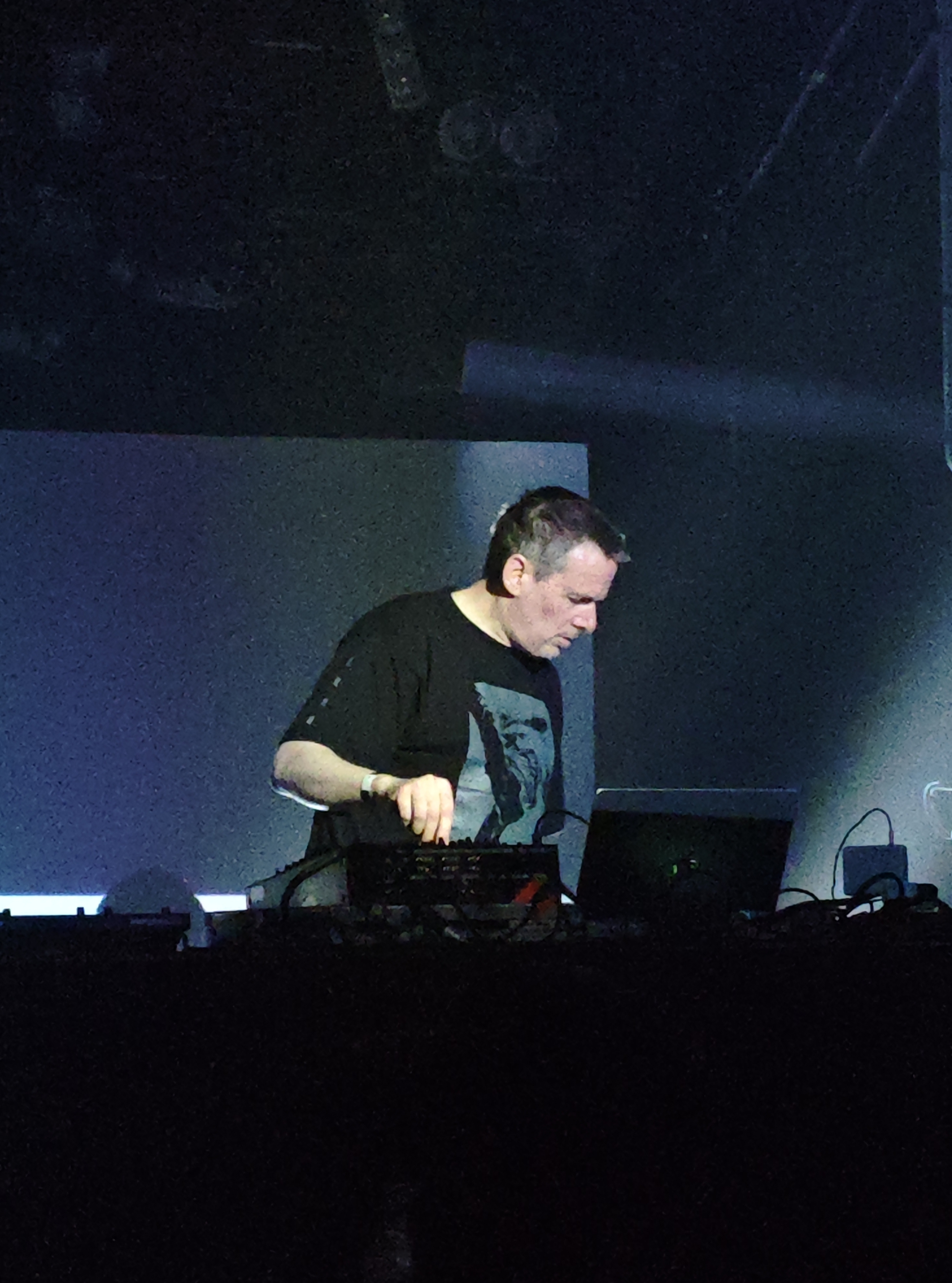
- Clark playing a set at the Grange à Musique, in Creil, France, 2026

Background information
- Born: Christopher Stephen Clark; 29 August 1979 (age 47); St Albans, Hertfordshire, England
- Genres: Electronic; IDM; classical; ambient; experimental
- Occupations: Musician; music producer; composer
- Instruments: Synthesiser; drums; sampler; guitar
- Years active: 2000–present
- Labels: Warp; Throttle Records; Deutsche Grammophon
- Website: throttleclark.com

Christopher Stephen Clark (born 29 August 1979) is an English electronic musician, producer and composer, known professionally as Clark. He initially released music as Chris Clark on Warp Records from 2001, shortening his artist name to Clark in 2006. His work spans electronic, ambient, contemporary classical and experimental genres, and has been released on Warp, Deutsche Grammophon and his own label Throttle Records.

Over a career spanning more than twenty years, Clark has received critical acclaim for his studio albums. Body Riddle (2006) was awarded 8.5 out of 10 by Pitchfork, and his album Clark (2014) received Pitchfork's Best New Music designation. His tenth album, Sus Dog (2023), was executive-produced by Thom Yorke, who contributed vocals and bass to the record; it was named Album of the Year by Bleep. Clark has a longstanding creative collaboration with choreographer Melanie Lane.

From 2015, Clark has also worked extensively as a screen composer. He scored The Last Panthers (Sky Atlantic/Canal+, 2015), the BAFTA-nominated series Kiri (Channel 4, 2018) and Lisey's Story (Apple TV+, 2021), directed by Pablo Larraín. His album Playground in a Lake (2021), recorded with orchestral ensembles in Budapest and Berlin and released on Deutsche Grammophon, marked a crossover into contemporary classical music. Clark continues to release music on his own Throttle Records label.

== Early life ==
Clark grew up in St Albans, Hertfordshire. As a teenager, he began making music with an EMU sampler, an Atari computer and assorted cheap hardware, recording entirely in mono. He could not save his work on the Atari, meaning every track had to be completed in a single session. He also built homemade equipment, including a "home-built stylus made out of a hook and some masking tape". A music teacher told him that buying a drum machine would mean giving up all hope in his musical ability.

Clark went on to attend the University of Bristol, where his set-up consisted of a sampler and an Atari which he used for about three years. He also sent cassette tape demos to Warp Records, and whilst still a student, impressed staff at Warp Records playing under the moniker Chris From St Albans at their Nesh party in December 2000.

== Career ==
=== 2001–2005: Early releases ===
Clark signed with Warp Records and released his debut album, Clarence Park, in April 2001, under the name Chris Clark. It includes the upbeat track "Lord of the Dance". His second album, Empty the Bones of You, followed in September 2003 on Warp. Reviews noted that Clark had developed a more mature and distinctive voice; The Milk Factory described the record as "consistent, mature and bloody captivating".

After university, Clark moved to Brighton and then to Birmingham, where he lived near the band Broadcast and borrowed the drum kit of the drummer, James Cargill. During this period he collaborated with Broadcast on a reinterpretation of his track "Herr Barr" and other unreleased material.

=== 2006–2009: Body Riddle and name change ===
With the release of the EP Throttle Furniture in 2006, Clark shortened his artist name from Chris Clark to Clark. His third album, Body Riddle, was released in October 2006 on Warp Records and marked a shift in approach, featuring the prominent use of live instrumentation, albeit heavily processed. Clark used Cargill's drum kit for the album's drum recordings, and the record was well received by critics: Pitchfork awarded it 8.5 out of 10 and Almost Cool gave it 8 out of 10. In 2017, Pitchfork ranked Body Riddle 17th on its list of "The 50 Best IDM Albums of All Time", and the album has been cited as an influence by producers including Rustie and Hudson Mohawke.

Following Body Riddle, Clark relocated to Berlin. His fourth album, Turning Dragon, recorded in his Berlin apartment, was released on 28 January 2008 on Warp Records and explored a less organic, more mechanised sound shaped by his experience touring continental rave venues. It was well received critically, with Pitchfork awarding it 8.2 out of 10 and Resident Advisor giving it 4 out of 5.

Clark's fifth album, Totems Flare, was released in July 2009 on Warp Records and was his first to feature his own processed vocals. During this period, Clark's music received airplay on BBC Radio 6 Music from presenters including Shaun Keaveny, Lauren Laverne and Tom Ravenscroft. He also recorded a mix for Ravenscroft's programme.

=== 2012–2014: Iradelphic to Clark ===
Clark's sixth album, Iradelphic, was released in April 2012 on Warp Records. For the album, Clark learned and played acoustic guitar, marking a shift from the aggressive electronic approach of his earlier releases, and recorded vocal sessions with Martina Topley-Bird at Hot Chip's studio. The Quietus described it as "less ethereal, more compact and cohesive" than his earlier work, and Clark himself commented that Iradelphic was "some of the most heartfelt stuff I've ever done". The remix compilation Feast/Beast followed in September 2013 on Warp, predominantly featuring Clark's remixes of tracks by Nathan Fake, Battles, Nils Frahm and Letherette, alongside reworks of Clark's own material by other artists.

In December 2013, Clark premiered his live show Phosphor in London. During this period, Clark began his creative partnership with choreographer Melanie Lane, collaborating on dance works including Tilted Fawn (2010, Sydney Opera House). He also contributed to art installations with Blast Theory and at Saatchi & Saatchi.

Clark's seventh studio album, Clark, was released on 3 November 2014 on Warp Records. Written and recorded over a continuous four-month session in an isolated barn near Newton, Lincolnshire, it was the first time he had made an entire album in one location. The album also marked his transition from Logic Pro to Ableton Live. It received widespread critical acclaim, earning a Best New Music designation from Pitchfork and a score of 83 out of 100 on Metacritic from 15 reviews. Drowned in Sound awarded it 9 out of 10, calling it "his finest hour to date". The album reached number 17 on the US Dance/Electronic Albums chart and number 20 on the Heatseekers Albums chart. Pitchfork ranked it number 48 on their 50 Best Albums of 2014 list, and Vice named it 13th best album of the year.

=== 2015–2018: Film and television scoring ===
From 2015, Clark began pursuing screen scoring alongside his studio albums, later noting that "you get options to record with more musicians when you score and I found that was a nice thing to have running alongside the solo work". His first major scoring project was The Last Panthers (2015).

Clark's eighth studio album, Death Peak, was released in April 2017 on Warp Records — his last original studio release on the label — reaching number 11 on the UK Dance Albums Chart and number 20 on the UK Independent Albums Chart. Clash named it the 33rd best album of 2017. That same year, he scored the BBC/Cinemax crime drama Rellik. In 2018, he scored the Channel 4 mini-series Kiri.

=== 2019–2021: Deutsche Grammophon and classical crossover ===
In July 2019, Clark released Kiri Variations on his own Throttle Records label, a standalone album derived from his score for Kiri. Later that year, Clark scored the psychological horror film Daniel Isn't Real — his first feature film score — with the accompanying soundtrack released on Deutsche Grammophon, marking his first release on the label.

Clark's next album, Playground in a Lake, was released on 26 March 2021 on Deutsche Grammophon. For the project, Clark taught himself to read and write sheet music, having been entirely self-taught as a musician up to that point. Clark described the album as an "extinction myth" dealing with climate change told in mythological terms. Recorded with orchestral ensembles in Budapest and Berlin over a period of five years, the album featured musicians including cellist Oliver Coates and Grizzly Bear's Chris Taylor on clarinet. The record represented a significant stylistic shift, with Clark abandoning programmed beats in favour of an ambient, contemporary-classical approach. On 16 October 2021, Clark performed the album live at the Barbican Centre with the London Contemporary Orchestra, conducted by Robert Ames — his first orchestral performance before a live audience.

Also in 2021, Clark scored the Apple TV+ mini-series Lisey's Story, directed by Pablo Larraín.

=== 2022–present: Throttle Records and recent work ===
On 13 July 2022, Clark released a remastered version of Body Riddle and announced Body Double, a double album pairing the remaster with 05-10, a new album of previously unreleased older material. Body Double was released on 30 September 2022.

Clark's tenth album, Sus Dog, was released on 26 May 2023 on Throttle Records. Executive-produced by Thom Yorke, who contributed vocals and bass, the album was Clark's first to prominently feature his own singing. Yorke described his role as that of "a kind of backseat driver". Sus Dog was named Album of the Year by Bleep. A companion album, Cave Dog, followed on 1 December 2023 on Throttle Records. It contained new tracks alongside reworked versions of Sus Dog songs.

Clark scored Naqqash Khalid's debut feature film In Camera (2024). His next album, Steep Stims, was released in 2025 on Throttle Records. Roughly 80–90% of the album was made using an Access Virus synthesizer and a drum machine as a deliberate creative constraint. This was followed by the film score We Bury the Dead in January 2026, also on Throttle Records.

== Artistry ==
Clark's music is generally considered to fall under the genre of electronic music, although he has resisted the label, stating "I don't use purely 'electronic' tools. I don't see myself as an electronic musician, even." He described Turning Dragon as a techno album and characterised the Turning Dragon and Totems Flare period as being "all about dominating machines and pushing stuff as loud as it could go—still retaining a harmonic, emotional core, but really burying it in distortion and loudness". His work has since expanded to encompass acoustic instrumentation on Iradelphic (2012), orchestral composition on Playground in a Lake (2021), and hardware-constrained synthesis on Steep Stims (2025), which was composed almost entirely on an Access Virus synthesizer and drum machine as a deliberate constraint.

Clark's production frequently involves degradation, distortion and decay, employing techniques such as re-recording samples and field recordings through multiple environments. For Body Riddle, Clark made field recordings in caves in Wales with friends Richard Roberts (later of Letherette) and Stephen Wilkinson (later known as Bibio), chanting drones together on a Sony dictaphone. He has described this approach as: "What I tend to do is just jam stuff through as many boxes as I can, until everything sort of bleeds into itself and all its surrounding parts". Clark is also a drummer, and some of his recordings, particularly Body Riddle, feature heavily re-sampled live drumming.

Clark's first processed vocals appeared on Totems Flare (2009), described by Drowned in Sound as "shockingly high in the mix". His tenth album Sus Dog (2023) was his first to feature sustained, unprocessed singing, a decision he linked to developments in artificial intelligence-generated music, noting that singing provides "a very direct way to instantly have a thumbprint on what you do that isn't easily imitated".

Clark has stressed his commitment to the album as a form: "I've always tried to write albums rather than tracks for streaming services. I'm always going to be an album artist whether the form's alive or only loved by a hundred people." For Playground in a Lake, he learned to read and write sheet music, marking a crossover into contemporary classical composition.

== Live performances ==
Clark has described his live shows as "a pure sonic event", noting: "it’s just music, it’s just people. You can hear songs loud." His live set has at times included a drummer. In 2013, Clark debuted ‘’Phosphor’’, an audiovisual live show, in London.

To accompany Death Peak, Clark developed Death Peak Live, a touring show combining his electronic performances with contemporary dance choreographed by Melanie Lane, featuring dancers Sophia Ndaba and Kianí Del Valle and a light installation by Flat-E. The production toured over 29 venues across 15 countries between 2017 and 2019, with its final performance at FFKT 2019 in Nagano, Japan.

Clark has played a Boiler Room session and performed at venues including the Berlin club Berghain and the Pritzker Pavilion in Chicago. Festival appearances have included Bang Face, Sónar Tokyo, Sacrum Profanum and Taico Club. Clark has cited live performances as directly influencing his studio work; after road-testing material from ‘’Steep Stims’’ in live sets, he noted: "I came back from these shows and realised I had an album on my hands as I would work on the tracks much more because I was enjoying it, I was lost in it."

== Film and television scores ==
Before moving into dedicated screen work, Clark's existing music was used in other media: the track "The Pining Pt.2" from Iradelphic was featured in the 2013 film Elysium, and "Vengeance Drools" was used in a domestic violence awareness advertising campaign by Women's Aid, starring Keira Knightley.

In 2015, Clark scored the six-part television series The Last Panthers, starring Samantha Morton, John Hurt and Tahar Rahim, broadcast on Sky Atlantic and Canal+. Clark's score was released as a standalone album on Warp Records in March 2016. In 2017, he scored the BBC/Cinemax crime drama Rellik, describing the composition as an "elastic, versatile music fabric that I could weave into the series at will". In 2018, Clark composed a minimal, a cappella voice-dominated soundtrack for the Channel 4/Hulu mini-series Kiri. The series was nominated for a BAFTA in the Mini-Series category.

In 2019, Clark scored the psychological horror film Daniel Isn't Real, directed by Adam Egypt Mortimer. The score featured a Budapest Art Orchestra string ensemble, with Headphone Commute describing it as "textural, organic, and incredibly dynamic". The soundtrack was released on Deutsche Grammophon on 6 December 2019. In 2021, Clark scored Lisey's Story, an Apple TV+ adaptation the novel by Stephen King, directed by Pablo Larraín. Larraín had heard the Daniel Isn't Real soundtrack and approached Clark directly to compose the score. In 2024, Clark scored Naqqash Khalid's debut feature film In Camera and expanded the score into a standalone soundtrack album on Throttle Records.

== Dance ==
Clark has a longstanding creative collaboration with Australian choreographer Melanie Lane, spanning more than fifteen works from 2010 to the present. In 2010, Clark scored a contemporary dance piece titled Tilted Fawn, performed by Lane at the Sydney Opera House. The piece won the Dance & Physical Theatre Award at the Fringe World Awards in 2012. The pair also collaborated on the 2013 performance installation Shrine, which trod "the line between dance performance and sculptural installation" and was centred on ideas of ritual and ceremony. Shrine was also presented at Tanzforum Berlin.

In 2017, Clark composed the score for WOOF, a dance work for Sydney Dance Company that premiered as part of the company's New Breed programme. The work was expanded for the company's 50th anniversary triple bill in 2019 and toured nationally.

In November 2023, Clark and Lane premiered Mountain, a large-scale dance and live music work featuring the Canberra Symphony Orchestra Chamber Ensemble and costumes by Akira Isogawa, at Phoenix Central Park in Sydney. The work received its Victorian premiere at the Melbourne Recital Centre in August 2024.

In September 2024, Lane and Clark premiered Love Lock, a contemporary dance work for Sydney Dance Company, as part of the Twofold double bill at the Roslyn Packer Theatre, Sydney. Lane has also choreographed Clark's live shows from 2015 onwards.

In April 2025, Clark performed Refractions — a collaboration with Manchester Collective and Melanie Lane, under the creative direction of violinist Rakhi Singh — at the Bridgewater Hall, Manchester and Queen Elizabeth Hall, London.

== Art installations ==
In 2011, Clark contributed music, along with fellow Warp artist Jamie Lidell, to a giant interactive projection show at Saatchi & Saatchi's New Director Showcase.

Also in 2011, Clark collaborated with Brighton-based artist collective Blast Theory on Fixing Point, an interactive audio walk dealing with the legacy of the conflict in Northern Ireland, in particular the disappearance of Seamus Ruddy.

== Video games ==
Clark licensed music for the video game Sleeping Dogs (2012), which featured a Warp Records in-game radio station. He also contributed to the soundtrack of Driveclub. The song "Winter Linn" from Clark was included in Watch Dogs 2.

== Music videos ==
Notable music videos for Clark's work include Lynn Fox's video for "Gob Coitus", 1stavemachine's video for "Ted" - selected by Pitchfork as one of the top 50 music videos of 2007 - James Healy's video for "Herr Barr", and The Vikings' video for "Black Stone". Christopher Hewitt directed the videos for "Winter Linn" and "To Live And Die in Grantham", and Sander Houtkruijer directed "Peak Magnetic".

The video for "Lambent Rag" (2021) was directed by frequent collaborator Melanie Lane. Australian artist Jonathan Zawada, who also designed the album cover art, created the music video for "Citrus" from Playground in a Lake. In 2025, Lane directed the music video for "Civilians" from Steep Stims, a seven-dancer choreographic piece produced with Corps Conspirators and filmed by Non Studio.

== Personal life ==
Clark has lived in Brighton, Birmingham and Berlin over the course of his career. As of 2023, he lives and works in Brighton.

== Discography ==
=== Studio albums ===
- Clarence Park (Warp, 2001)*
- Empty the Bones of You (Warp, 2003)*
- Body Riddle (Warp, 2006)
- Turning Dragon (Warp, 2008)
- Totems Flare (Warp, 2009)
- Iradelphic (Warp, 2012)
- Clark (Warp, 2014)
- Death Peak (Warp, 2017)
- Playground in a Lake (Deutsche Grammophon, 2021)
- Sus Dog (Throttle Records, 2023)
- Cave Dog (Throttle Records, 2023)
- Steep Stims (Throttle Records, 2025)
- Steep Stims II (Throttle Records, 2026)

=== Soundtracks ===
- The Last Panthers (Warp, 2016)
- Kiri Variations (Throttle Records, 2019)
- Daniel Isn't Real (Deutsche Grammophon, 2019)
- Lisey's Story (WaterTower Music / Loud Robot, 2021)
- In Camera (Throttle Records, 2024)
- We Bury the Dead (Throttle Records, 2026)

=== Compilations ===
- Feast / Beast (Warp, 2013)
- 05-10 (Warp, 2022)

=== Select singles and EPs ===
- Ceramics Is the Bomb (2003)*
- Throttle Furniture (2006)
- Ted E.P. (2007)
- Growls Garden (2009)
- Fantasm Planes (2012)
- Superscope (2014)
- Flame Rave (2015)
- Honey Badger / Pig (2017)
- E.C.S.T. T.R.A.X. (2018)
- Branding Problem (2019)
- Love Lock Floot (2024)
- Modal Stims (2026)
- Opponent Stims (2026)
- Entity Stims (2026)

*originally released as Chris Clark.
