= Manchester Collective =

Chamber ensemble

- Origin: Manchester, England
- Genres: Classical, experimental
- Occupation: Chamber ensemble
- Years active: 2016-Present
- Label: Bedroom Community
- Website: manchestercollective.co.uk

Manchester Collective is a chamber-music ensemble consisting of a rotating group of musicians. Its repertoire generally consists of 20th and 21st century works with a focus on commissioning living composers. They are supported by the Arts Council England, Foyle Foundation, Garfield Weston Foundation and the PRS Foundation.

== History ==
Manchester Collective was founded in 2016 by violinist and composer Rakhi Singh.

They have commissioned works by contemporary composers such as Kelly Moran, Ben Nobuto, Zubin Kanga, Oliver Leith, Mahan Esfahani, Héloïse Werner, Abel Selaocoe, Vijay Iyer, Alice Zawadzki, Moor Mother, Edmund Finnis, and Hannah Peel.

In addition to commissioning new works, Manchester Collective also performs 20th-century classical repertoire by composers such as works by Arvo Pärt, Morton Feldman, Michael Gordon, Steve Reich, George Crumb, and Pyotr Tchaikovsky.

In 2021, Manchester Collective made their Royal Albert Hall debut as part of the BBC Proms Festival alongside Mahan Esfahani.

They are currently the artists-in-residence at the Southbank Centre.

In 2023, they won the Royal Philharmonic Society's Ensemble award.

On 12 June 2024, they announced composer Jasmin Kent Rodgman as their Co-Artistic Director.

In April 2025, Manchester Collective premiered Refractions at Queen Elizabeth Hall (Southbank Centre) and Bridgewater Hall in Manchester. Co-commissioned by the Southbank Centre and Bridgewater Hall, the programme interwove compositions by Clark, arranged for the ensemble by Singh, with works from the classical canon ranging from Hildegard of Bingen and Bach to Ligeti, performed with Clark's live electronics and choreography by Melanie Lane as a continuous programme without interval.

The ensemble has released four studio albums on Bedroom Community.

== Discography ==
=== Albums ===
- The Centre is Everywhere (2021) - Bedroom Community
- Shades (2022) - Bedroom Community
- Neon (2023) - Bedroom Community
- End of My Days (2024) - Bedroom Community

=== EPs ===
- Recreation (2020) - Bedroom Community
