= Abel Selaocoe =

South African cellist and singer (born 1992)

- Born: 5 March 1992 (age 34); Sebokeng, South Africa
- Occupations: Musician, singer, composer
- Instrument: cello
- Label: Warner Classics
- Website: www.abelselaocoe.com

Abel Selaocoe (born 5 March 1992) is a cellist, singer, composer and improviser from South Africa.

Selaocoe was born in 1992 in Sebokeng, a township in South Africa. He started learning classical cello following his older brother Sammy at a Saturday music programme for children at the African Cultural Organization of South Africa (ACOSA) in Soweto. At 13 Selaocoe won a scholarship to St Johns College in Johannesburg. At the college he studied with the teacher Matlhaela Michael Masote, one of South Africa’s most influential classical musicians.

In 2010 Selaocoe moved to Manchester and enrolled at the Royal Northern College of Music. He completed his International Artist Diploma in 2018.

In 2016, Selaocoe formed trio Chesaba, and in 2022 formed the Bantu Ensemble.

In 2021 Selaocoe signed to Warner Classics record label.

On 23 September 2022 Selaocoe released his debut album Where is Home (Hae Ke Kae).

Selaocoe is an Artistic Partner of The Saint Paul Chamber Orchestra, Artist in Association with the BBC Singers and Artist in Residence with Kölner Philharmonie.

== Style ==
Abel Selaocoe combines classical cello with traditional South African singing. His vocals are inspired by the throat singing of the Xhosa people. His music combines different genres including classical suite, township rhythms and ancestral anthems. His tracks include translations in African languages including Sotho and Zulu.

== Awards ==
- RPS Instrumentalist Award (2023)

== Collaborations ==
- Manchester Collective
- Art Ensemble of Chicago
- London Symphony Orchestra
- BBC National Orchestra of Wales
- BBC Concert Orchestra
- Britten Sinfonia
- Artistic Partner of The Saint Paul Chamber Orchestra
- Artist in Association with the BBC Singers
- Artist in Residence with Kölner Philharmonie

== Discography ==
- Where Is Home (Hae Ke Kae) (2022)
- Hymns of Bantu (2025)
- Four Spirits (2025)
