= Body Riddle =

2006 studio album by Clark

Studio album by Clark
- Released: 2 October 2006
- Recorded: 2005–2006
- Genres: IDM; electronica
- Length: 42:03
- Label: Warp
- Producer: Christopher Clark

Clark chronology
Empty the Bones of You (2003)	Body Riddle (2006)	Turning Dragon (2008)

Body Riddle is the third studio album by English electronic musician Clark, released on 2 October 2006 by Warp Records. It was his first release under the mononym Clark, having previously recorded as Chris Clark. The album marked a departure from the purely electronic sound of his earlier work, incorporating live drums, acoustic instruments, and field recordings made in caves in Wales.

Body Riddle received widespread critical acclaim upon release, with Drowned in Sound awarding 9 out of 10 and Pitchfork giving 8.5 out of 10. In 2017, Pitchfork ranked it 17th on its list of "The 50 Best IDM Albums of All Time". The album has been cited as an influence by producers including Rustie and Hudson Mohawke. It was remastered and reissued in 2022, accompanied by 05–10, a companion album of unreleased material from the same era.

== Background ==
Clark's second album Empty the Bones of You (2003) had been a purely electronic record. Clark later described it as "quite meticulous, more like a bonsai tree garden" that was "quite delicate because of the constraints of purely electronic sounds." After its release, he relocated to Birmingham. He found himself living approximately ten minutes from Broadcast members Trish Keenan and James Cargill, fellow Warp artists, and began spending time at their studio.

Clark's tastes were shifting during this period. He recalled "getting really into krautrock and spending the day drumming on pillows along to Can records for six hours a day." He wanted his next album to be a deliberate departure from the electronic constraints of Empty the Bones of You, seeking something "more alive in a way, more carefree, and more embodied and visceral." In February 2006, Clark released the Throttle Furniture EP on Warp, which served as a preview of the new material and marked his first release under the shortened name Clark, dropping the "Chris" he had used on his first two albums.

== Recording ==
Body Riddle was recorded at Clark's home studio in Birmingham. He borrowed a Ludwig drum kit and a Korg MS-20 synthesiser from Cargill, and the acoustic drums on the album were played entirely by Clark on this kit. Other equipment used during the sessions included a Waldorf Pulse synthesiser, a Sherman Filterbank, a Yamaha CS1x, an out-of-tune piano, a viola, a music box, and a Revox tape machine. Clark used Logic as his primary digital audio workstation, supplemented by AudioMulch.

Clark made extensive use of field recordings. On weekends he travelled to caves in Wales with friends Richard Roberts (later of Letherette) and Stephen Wilkinson (later known as Bibio), where they chanted drones together, recorded on a Sony dictaphone. Roberts and Wilkinson are credited on the album for vocal assistance on the track "Vengeance Drools". Clark also experimented with extreme pitch-shifting; on "Roulette Thrift Run", he recorded a door hinge at a 192 kHz sample rate and pitched it down by four octaves, creating a sound he compared to an "Ornette Coleman-style" saxophone. The same track ends with a jam session between Cargill on guitar and Clark on drums, which Clark subsequently pitched up. In August 2006, ahead of the album's release, Clark and Broadcast collaborated on a reinterpretation of the opening track "Herr Bar", which was released as a free download from Clark's website; this featured Broadcast's celeste and glockenspiel, with Clark adding overdubs at home.

The album sat incomplete for approximately six months, with a strong collection of tracks but lacking a piece to tie it together. The final element came when Clark revisited "Night Knuckles", a track he had originally written at age 18, before his debut album Clarence Park (2001). Its inclusion completed the album's narrative arc. Clark later described the record as "a bit of a blueprint for how things have gone with my music since then, because it's just so dynamic and all over the place and messy, but intentional, and the mess feels deliberate and the accidents feel illuminating and exciting."

Clark was in severe financial hardship during the recording. He later recalled: "I was really skint at the time, basically eating cabbage and bean soup. But, I was the happiest I think I've ever been, because I just knew I had this album."

== Music ==
Reviewers described Body Riddle as a blend of IDM, glitch, and organic instrumentation that departed from the conventions of purely electronic music. Ed Gillett of The Quietus characterised it as having "layers of heat-warped melodies, flickering textures and muscular drumming" that created "a beautiful and unstable mixture of violence and wistfulness", with production that was "immaculate, almost inhumanly so, swaddling the listener in midrange before pummelling them viciously, shifting seamlessly between organic instruments and impossible, vertiginous sound design."

Ryan Dombal of Pitchfork noted that Clark "infuses sonic streaks of contemporaries like Four Tet, Prefuse 73, and DJ Shadow into his repertoire, along with his usual Aphex and Boards of Canada tics". Seb Chan of Cyclic Defrost observed that the album was "on the very edge of distortion" yet "filled with lush string arrangements, 70s jazz breaks, and intricately programmed electronics". Boomkat described the album as "opaque in delivery but finely detailed on closer inspection", noting that Clark edged "closer to overtly musical territory" by etching electronics "into a bedrock of live instrumentation".

Clark himself described the album as "an abstract krautrock record" and said he always associated it with Broadcast and Can, "even though it doesn't sound like them." He characterised Body Riddle as "pure listening music" and stressed his commitment to the album as a form: "I've always tried to write albums rather than tracks for streaming services. I'm always going to be an album artist whether the form's alive or only loved by a hundred people."

== Release and promotion ==
Body Riddle was released on 2 October 2006 on Warp Records, available on CD in a digipak and as a double LP. A Japanese edition on Beat Records included the bonus track "Observe Harvest". Copies ordered from Warp's mail-order service Warpmart were shipped with Throttle Clarence, a companion EP of eight additional tracks that Warp described as "Body Riddle's ravier younger brother".

The Ted EP was released in March 2007, featuring the title track from the album alongside a remix by Bibio and four non-album tracks. A music video for "Ted" was directed by Arvind Palep of 1st Ave Machine, featuring CGI insects in a surrealist exploration of synthetic biology and artificial life. The video was selected by Pitchfork as one of the top 50 music videos of 2007. A music video for "Herr Bar" was directed by Claire Carre. The Throttle Promoter EP followed in December 2007, completing a trilogy of "Throttle"-titled EPs from the Body Riddle era.

"Vengeance Drools" was used in the 2009 short film Cut, a campaign for the charity Women's Aid directed by Joe Wright and starring Keira Knightley.

== Critical reception ==
Professional ratings
Review scores
Source	Rating
Drowned in Sound	9/10
Pitchfork	8.5/10

Body Riddle received widespread critical acclaim. Mike Diver of Drowned in Sound awarded 9 out of 10, describing it as "a magnificent album" and "a complex sci-fi patchwork of glacial chimes and skittering computerised percussion". Ryan Dombal of Pitchfork gave it 8.5 out of 10, writing that Clark "crafts his best album to date". Tony Ware of XLR8R observed that "what before sounded forced now swings refined", highlighting tracks that recalled "everything from fuzz-filter funk to the spiny mecho-organic convulsions of Richard D. James".

Seb Chan of Cyclic Defrost praised the album as "superb", noting that "every sound so carefully, obsessively, worked on... it is amazing that it manages to come together with so much life left intact." Igloo Magazine called it "Clark's best work to date" and "much more cohesive" than Empty the Bones of You, advising listeners to give it time and avoid listening via compressed MP3 files. A reviewer at LonelyMachines concluded: "Just when I think electronic music is in a rut, it seems something like this comes along to redeem it." Thom Holmes of Contactmusic.com compared the album to Drukqs and Ultravisitor as a "coming of age" record for Clark.

== Legacy ==
=== Retrospective assessments ===
Writing in The Quietus in 2014, Ed Gillett described Body Riddle as "one of electronic music's unheralded masterpieces". Tim O'Neil of PopMatters called it "a universally lauded example of modern IDM that took as its signature theme the human body and the mysteries of its interior". In 2017, Pitchfork ranked Body Riddle at number 17 on its list of "The 50 Best IDM Albums of All Time". In 2026, Discogs selected it for a list of "15 Essential IDM Albums 1992–Present".

The album has been cited as an influence by producers including Rustie and Hudson Mohawke. In 2022, MusicRadar featured it in their "Classic Album" retrospective series.

=== 2022 reissue ===
On 30 September 2022, Warp reissued Body Riddle as a remastered double LP, its first vinyl pressing in 16 years. A limited-edition gold vinyl pressing was also produced. Alongside the reissue, Clark released 05–10, a 12-track companion album of previously unreleased material and rarities from the 2005–2010 period, including the Clark and Broadcast improvisation on "Herr Bar" and three tracks from the Throttle Furniture live gig exclusive. Both releases were also available as a combined two-CD set titled Body Double.

Alexander Hosford of Igloo Magazine reviewed the reissue, describing the album as having "marked a turning point from the ethereal roots of his first two releases to the more disruptive and chaotic style that would influence his later work." Andrew C. Kidd of Monolith Cocktail called it "one of the defining sounds of mid-noughties Warp" and praised the transition from "Herzog" to "Ted" as "one of the best track transitions in electronic music".

== Track listing ==
No.	Title	Length
1.	"Herr Bar"	3:54
2.	"Frau Wav"	4:12
3.	"Springtime Epigram"	1:35
4.	"Herzog"	4:23
5.	"Ted"	2:54
6.	"Roulette Thrift Run"	3:22
7.	"Vengeance Drools"	3:43
8.	"Dew on the Mouth"	1:05
9.	"Matthew Unburdened"	5:39
10.	"Night Knuckles"	3:49
11.	"The Autumnal Crush"	7:27

Japanese edition bonus track
No.	Title	Length
12.	"Observe Harvest"	5:14

== Personnel ==
Credits adapted from the liner notes of Body Riddle.

=== Musicians ===
- Christopher Clark – performance, arrangements
- Richard Roberts – vocal assistance (track 7)
- Stephen Wilkinson – vocal assistance (track 7)

=== Technical personnel ===
- Christopher Clark – production
- Naweed – mastering (at Frequency Mastering, Soho, London)

=== Design ===
- Universal Everything – design
