= Empty the Bones of You =

2003 studio album by Chris Clark

Studio album by Chris Clark
- Released: 8 September 2003
- Genre: Electronic; IDM
- Length: 48:54
- Label: Warp Records
- Producer: Clark

Chris Clark chronology
Clarence Park (2001)	Empty the Bones of You (2003)	Body Riddle (2006)

Empty the Bones of You is the second studio album by British electronic musician Clark (as Chris Clark), released on 8 September 2003 by Warp Records. The cover art was designed by The Designers Republic.

== Background ==
Clark later described the album as "quite meticulous, more like a bonsai tree garden" and "the introverted world of Empty the Bones of You that was quite concise and measured", contrasting it with the more visceral approach of his subsequent album Body Riddle.

A music video for "Gob Coitus" was directed by Lynn Fox.

== Critical reception ==
Professional ratings
Review scores
Source	Rating
AllMusic	3/5 stars
Pitchfork	7.8/10
Uncut	3/5 stars

Empty the Bones of You received generally positive reviews. Pitchfork gave the album 7.8 out of 10. The Milk Factory described it as "consistent, mature and bloody captivating". Jacob Arnold of Gridface praised Clark's darker and more texturally dense approach compared to Clarence Park.

== Track listing ==
No.	Title	Length
1.	"Indigo Optimus"	5:22
2.	"Holiday as Brutality"	3:24
3.	"Empty the Bones of You"	2:39
4.	"Early Moss"	2:56
5.	"Tyre"	1:12
6.	"Tycan"	4:19
7.	"Wolf"	6:21
8.	"Slow Spines"	3:38
9.	"Umbilical Hut"	3:41
10.	"Farewell Track"	3:06
11.	"Sun Too Slow"	0:56
12.	"Gavel: (Obliterated)"	3:46
13.	"Gob Coitus"	3:11
14.	"Betty"	4:23
Total length:		48:54

Japanese bonus track
No.	Title	Length
15.	"Alaska (1998 Tiny Person)"	4:17

== Personnel ==
Credits adapted from liner notes.

- Chris Clark – writing, production
- The Designers Republic – artwork
