= Lisey's Story =

Novel by Stephen King

- First edition cover
- Author: Stephen King
- Language: English
- Genre: Horror, Gothic
- Publisher: Scribner
- Publication date: October 24, 2006
- Publication place: United States
- Media type: Print (hardcover)
- Pages: 528
- ISBN: 978-0-7432-8941-2

Lisey's Story is a psychological horror romance novel by American writer Stephen King. The novel was released on October 24, 2006. It won the 2006 Bram Stoker Award for Best Novel, and was nominated for the World Fantasy Award in 2007. An early excerpt from the novel, a short story titled "Lisey and the Madman", was published in McSweeney’s Enchanted Chamber of Astonishing Stories (2004), and was nominated for the 2004 Bram Stoker Award for Best Long Fiction. King has stated that this is his favorite of the novels he has written.

The genesis for Lisey's Story was an incident in 2003, when King came down with double pneumonia; while he was in the hospital, his wife Tabitha decided to redesign his studio. Coming home from the hospital and seeing his books and belongings in boxes, King saw an image of what his studio would look like after his death.

== Plot ==
Lisey's Story is the story of Lisey Landon, the widow of a famous and wildly successful novelist, Scott Landon. The book tells two stories—Lisey's story in the present, and the story of her dead husband's life, as remembered by Lisey during the course of the novel.

It has been two years since the death of famous author Scott Landon, and his widow Lisey (pronounced /ˈliːsi/ LEE-see) is still in the process of cleaning out her husband's writing area. Over the past two years many academics have come to her hoping to find some piece of writing she might have missed, like an unpublished manuscript. Lisey has sent each away in their turn explaining that she's still working through the clean up, although her lack of progress speaks more to procrastination. Her mentally fragile sister Amanda spends a day with her, searching through stacks of books and magazines to earmark any pictures where Lisey appears or is mentioned.

Lisey begins to relive her past, starting with the time she saved Scott from being fatally shot by an insane fan. She often stops herself mid-reminiscence to avoid uncovering terrifying memories. After Amanda discovers that her ex-husband has remarried and is moving back to town, she slices open her hands and slips into catatonia. Before admitting Amanda to an institution, Lisey hears her sister speaking in Scott's voice, telling her he has created a "bool" hunt with a prize at the end. One day Lisey receives a disturbing phone call from a man calling himself Zack McCool, claiming that he will be forced to hurt her if she doesn't hand Scott's documents over to a professor she had recently chased away. After Zack leaves a threatening letter and a dead cat in her mailbox, Lisey alerts the authorities, but the most they can offer her is a patrol car stationed by her home unless an emergency arises elsewhere. This does not deter Zack in the least and he eventually sneaks onto her property and mutilates her with a can opener.

Throughout the book Lisey begins to face certain realities about her husband that she had repressed and forgotten. She recalls Scott's past — how he came from a family with a history of horrible mental illness that manifested as either an uncontrollable homicidal mania or as a deep catatonia; how he had a special ability to transport himself to another world with its own unique dangers which he called "Boo'ya Moon"; how Scott Landon's brother Paul was killed by their father when, at thirteen, Paul succumbed to the family disease and attempted to kill Scott — and how Scott really died.

Using her own repressed ability to cross over to Boo'ya Moon, Lisey is able to pull Amanda out of her catatonia, bring Zack to the other world, and lure him to his grisly death at the claws of a vicious world-crossing beast that stalks the forest of Boo'ya Moon.

The prize at the end of the hunt is a diary of Scott's last days with his family, ending with Scott Landon's confession that he was forced to kill his own father to save him from the madness that had finally taken him over.

Over the next week Lisey is able to pack and give up Scott's things as she now believes he has moved on. Now Lisey has a hard time keeping herself grounded in this world, often finding that she slips back to Boo'ya Moon in her sleep and sometimes while awake. The book ends with her saying goodbye to Scott in the empty study.

== Adaptation ==
In August 2017, King expressed an interest in seeing the story adapted as a television series. "Lisey's Story is my favorite of the books and I would love to see that done, especially now that there's a kind of openness on the streaming services on TV and even the cable networks. There's more freedom to do stuff now and when you do a movie from a book, there's this thing that I call the sitting on a suitcase syndrome. That is where you try to pack in all the clothes at once and the suitcase won't close. So it's tough to take a book that is fully textured, and do it in two hours and 10 minutes. But as a TV show you have 10 hours." In April 2019 it was announced that the book would be adapted as an eight part limited series called Lisey's Story, with all episodes scripted by Stephen King, starring Julianne Moore. The eight-episode miniseries premiered on Apple TV+ on June 4, 2021.
