= Naqqash Khalid =

Filmmaker (born 1993)

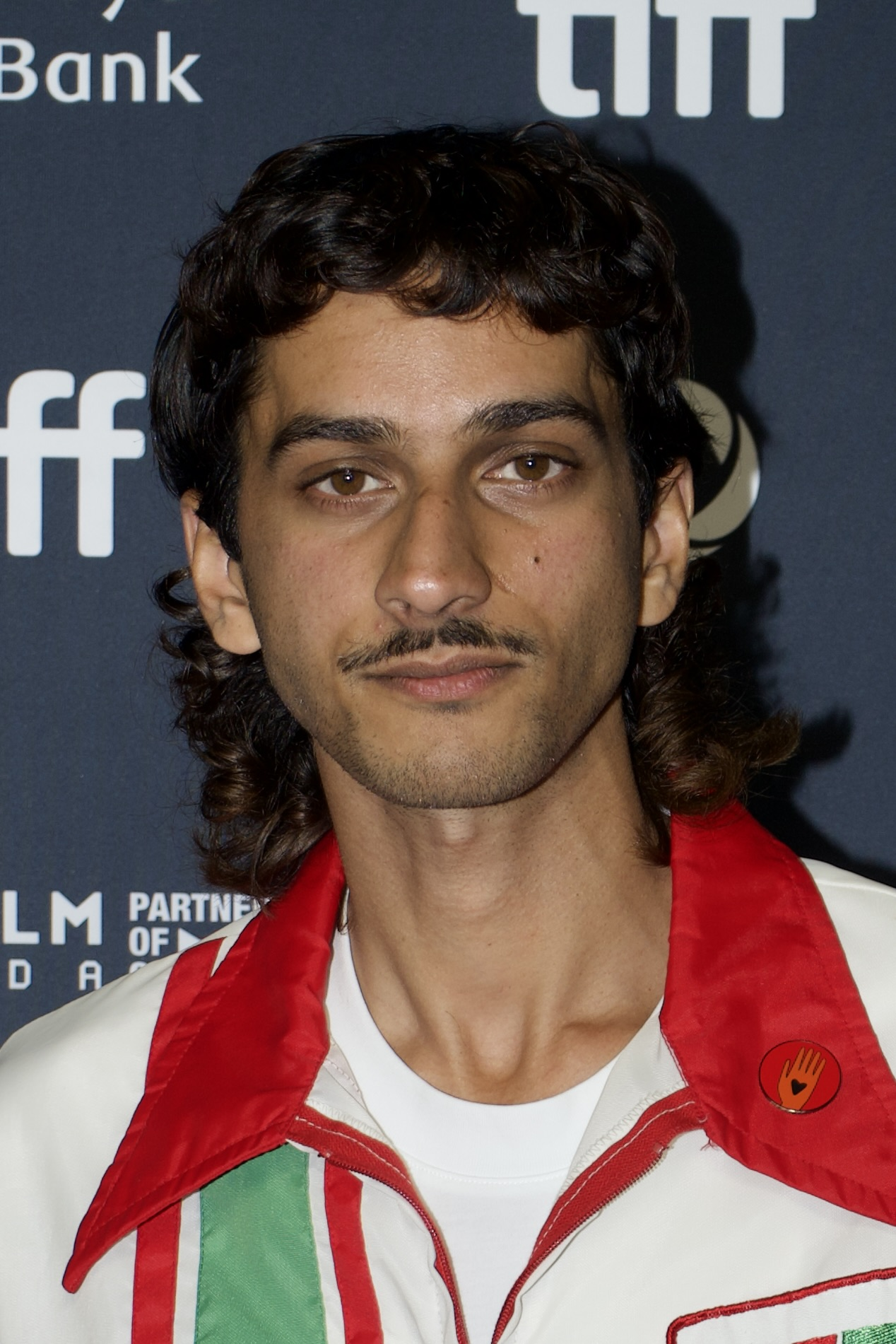
- Khalid in 2025
- Born: June 1993 (age 33)
- Education: University of Salford
- Years active: 2016–present
- Website: www.naqqashkhalid.co.uk

Naqqash Khalid (born June 1993) is an English film director, writer and academic. He was named a 2020 Screen International Star of Tomorrow. For his debut feature In Camera (2023), he won a BFI & Chanel Filmmaker Award and was nominated for Breakthrough British/Irish Filmmaker at the London Film Critics' Circle Awards.

== Early life and education ==
Khalid is from Prestwich, Greater Manchester. He graduated with a Bachelor of Arts (BA) in English literature from the University of Salford in 2015. He started a PhD, but withdrew to film In Camera.

At university, Khalid wrote his first play which was staged at various fringe theatres in Manchester and London.

During his PhD, Khalid lectured in Media and Performance at the University of Salford.

== Career ==
Self-taught, Khalid wrote, directed, and produced his first short film Parts in 2016. Principal photography took place over the course of twelve hours. This was followed by his second short film Stock in 2019 which was part of Sky Arts 50. He was subsequently attached to adapt Boris Vian's play The Empire Builders for television.

In 2019, Khalid was appointed a Creative Fellow of Factory International.

Khalid made his feature directorial debut with In Camera, starring Nabhaan Rizwan. The film satirises the struggle of finding work as an Asian actor in Western media and the "empty discourse on representation". Khalid had come up with the idea for the film during university and workshopped it over the years, with support from the BBC, Film4 and Creative UK.

In Camera opened at the 2023 Karlovy Vary International Film Festival to critical acclaim, screened at a number of subsequent festivals, and had a wide release in 2024. In September 2024, Khalid directed a music video for "Superstar" by Clark, who composed the film's score, re-editing footage from In Camera with the original cast.

== Artistry ==
In 2019, Khalid named Claire Denis, Olivier Assayas, Asghar Farhadi, Lynne Ramsay, Donald Glover and Ramy Youssef as influences. For In Camera, he drew upon the works of visual artists Rasheed Araeen and Anwar Jalal Shemza, and delved into the abolitionist works of Frantz Fanon, Malcolm X, bell hooks and Naomi Klein.

== Filmography ==
Year	Title	Director	Writer	Producer	Notes
2016	Parts	Yes	Yes	Yes	Short film
2017	The Ladies Room	No	Yes	No	Short film
2019	Stock	Yes	Yes	Yes	Television short
2023	In Camera	Yes	Yes	No	
2024	"Superstar"	Yes	No	No	Music video for Clark; re-edited from In Camera footage
2025	Flint	Yes	Yes	Yes	Short film
2025	Good Boy	No	Yes	No	
