= Kiri Variations =

Soundtrack album by Clark
- Released: 26 July 2019
- Recorded: 2018–2019
- Genre: Modern classical; ambient; electronic
- Length: 44:31
- Label: Throttle Records
- Producer: Clark

Clark chronology
Death Peak (2017)	Kiri Variations (2019)	Daniel Isn't Real (2019)

Kiri Variations is a studio album by British electronic musician Clark, released on 26 July 2019 on Throttle Records, his own label. It is Clark's first full-length release on the label. The album is based on material from Clark's score for the Channel 4 and Hulu television drama Kiri (2018), reworked and expanded into a standalone record.

== Background ==
Clark was commissioned to compose the score for Kiri, a four-part crime drama created by Jack Thorne and directed by Euros Lyn, starring Sarah Lancashire. Director Lyn used only a small portion of the music Clark recorded for the series, employing it sparingly throughout the drama. Clark subsequently reworked and expanded the unused material into a 14-track album, describing it as using the TV commission as "a prominent spark for new approaches".

Clark described the album's character as "plaintive beauty, eerie wyrd arcadian horror and childlike outsider music", driven by piano, harpsichord, cello, viola, electronics and voice. He likened the listening experience to reading "a set of Roald Dahl short stories; bittersweet tales with hooks and teeth and unexpected macabre twists". The album incorporates field recordings made on a 20-year-old dictaphone, including birdsong captured while cycling along Sweden's coast.

"Cannibal Homecoming" was released as the lead single alongside the album announcement and features Clark's own vocals prominently. An animated music video for "Primary Pluck" was created by illustrator David Foldvari, who also designed the album artwork.

== Critical reception ==
Professional ratings
Review scores
Source	Rating
Loud and Quiet	9/10
Pitchfork	5.8/10
The Line of Best Fit	9/10

Kiri Variations received positive reviews from specialist music press. The Line of Best Fit awarded 9 out of 10, calling it "courageous and quietly important". Alex Francis of Loud and Quiet also gave it 9 out of 10, describing it as "one of the richest, most satisfying electronic records of the year so far". Simon Tucker of Louder Than War called it "a fever dream of an album". Freddie Hudson of Inverted Audio praised Clark's use of imperfection and silence.

Pitchfork gave the album 5.8 out of 10.

== Track listing ==
No.	Title	Length
1.	"Forebode Pluck"	3:29
2.	"Simple Homecoming Loop"	2:24
3.	"Bench"	3:17
4.	"Kiri's Glee"	3:11
5.	"Coffin Knocker"	1:32
6.	"Forebode Knocker"	4:34
7.	"Yarraville Bird Phone"	3:55
8.	"Primary Pluck"	2:30
9.	"Flask / Abyss"	3:22
10.	"Tobi Thwarted"	3:21
11.	"Cannibal Homecoming"	3:34
12.	"Banished Hymnal"	2:52
13.	"Banished Cannibal"	4:03
14.	"Goodnight Kiri"	2:37
Total length:		44:31

== Personnel ==
Credits adapted from liner notes.

- Clark – composer, producer, performer, mastering
- Oliver Coates – cello
- Audun Andre Sandvik – cello
- Nora Taksdal – viola
- Barnby Road Academy Chamber Choir (led by Lizzie Greely) – vocals
- Rebecca Tilley – vocals
- Beau Thomas – mastering
- David Foldvari – illustration and design
