= Clarence Park (album) =

Studio album by Chris Clark
- Released: 2 April 2001
- Genre: IDM; electronic
- Length: 31:40
- Label: Warp Records
- Producer: Chris Clark

Chris Clark chronology
Clarence Park (2001)	Empty the Bones of You (2003)

Clarence Park is the debut studio album by British electronic musician Clark (as Chris Clark), released on 2 April 2001 on Warp Records. The album is named after Clarence Park, a public park in Clark's hometown of St Albans. Comprising 14 tracks in just over 31 minutes, it was recorded while Clark was a university student in Bristol using minimal equipment.

Clarence Park received mixed to positive reviews, with praise for Clark's melodic sensibility and sense of humour.

== Background ==
Clark grew up in St Albans, Hertfordshire, and began making electronic music as a teenager with an EMU sampler and an Atari computer. He sent cassette tape demos to Warp Records and was signed to the label, and whilst still at university in Bristol, he impressed Warp staff performing under the name "Chris From St Albans" at their Nesh party in December 2000.

Clark was approximately 21 years old when Clarence Park was released and was studying English literature at the University of Bristol. His recording set-up at university was limited to a sampler and an Atari, which he used for about three years. He could not save his work on the Atari, meaning every track had to be completed in a single session. He also used MiniDiscs with spliced edits of beats, reprocessing material through samplers repeatedly.

An expanded edition of Clarence Park was released digitally on 1 October 2012, adding eight tracks from the companion Throttle Clarence EP previously only available as a 3" CD and five bonus recordings from the same era.

== Critical reception ==
Professional ratings
Review scores
Source	Rating
AllMusic	3/5 stars
NME	7/10
Release Magazine	7/10

Clarence Park received mixed to positive reviews. NME's John Mulvey gave the album 7 out of 10, describing Clark as a "special, notably sweeter talent" on Warp Records and drawing comparisons to Boards of Canada and Aphex Twin. Release Magazine awarded 7 out of 10, comparing the album's rapid stylistic shifts to "Aphex Twin and Max Tundra trying to use the same sampler". PopMatters called it "a welcome debut" and noted Clark had "a good sense of humour and irony". AllMusic gave the album three out of five stars.

== Track listing ==
All tracks are written by Chris Clark.

No.	Title	Length
1.	"Pleen 1930s"	1:31
2.	"The Dogs"	2:53
3.	"Proper Lo-Fi"	3:13
4.	"Oaklands"	1:00
5.	"Bricks"	2:41
6.	"EmW"	0:37
7.	"A Laugh with Hills"	3:13
8.	"The Chase"	1:06
9.	"Lord of the Dance"	4:17
10.	"Caveman Lament"	2:46
11.	"Fossil Paste"	2:09
12.	"Diesel Raven"	2:53
13.	"Shrewland"	2:58
14.	"Nostalgic Oblong"	0:23
Total length:		31:40

2012 expanded edition – Throttle Clarence EP
No.	Title	Length
15.	"Wicked Life"	2:11
16.	"Lady Palindrome"	1:53
17.	"Friday Bread"	1:32
18.	"Proper Mid-Fi"	3:29
19.	"Bob Dedication"	4:02
20.	"820689"	1:04
21.	"Alpha Dodgem Fortitude"	2:10
22.	"Mother McKnight"	3:37

2012 expanded edition – bonus tracks
No.	Title	Length
23.	"Guitar Solo"	4:57
24.	"Racloir"	2:25
25.	"Perfectly Welcome"	3:30
26.	"Sabbath"	2:20
27.	"Robinson Crusoe"	6:06
