= Rakhi Singh =

English violinist

- Born: Wales, United Kingdom
- Origin: Manchester, England
- Genres: Classical, experimental
- Occupations: Musician; composer
- Instrument: Violin
- Years active: 2016-Present
- Labels: Bedroom Community, Cantaloupe Music
- Member of: Manchester Collective
- Website: rakhisinghmusic.co.uk

Rakhi Singh is a British violinist and composer who is best known as the Co-Founder and Co-Artistic Director of Manchester Collective. Her performances often focus on contemporary repertoire and often feature live electronic elements.

== Education and career ==
Singh studied at the Royal Academy of Music, receiving a postgraduate degree in chamber music, where her piano trio won a two-year Junior Leverhulme Chamber Music Fellowship.

In 2016, she founded Manchester Collective, a chamber music ensemble focused on 20th and 21-century classical music with an emphasis on performing works by living composers.

As a lead violinist, Singh has toured with Philip Glass, Zubin Kanga and Abel Selaocoe, and had guest appearances with ensembles including the Royal Liverpool Philharmonic, BBC Concert Orchestra, London Contemporary Orchestra and the City of Birmingham Symphony Orchestra.

She has performed with Manchester Collective at a variety of venues such as the Southbank Centre, Royal Albert Hall and the Royal Opera House.

Singh has also contributes violin as a recording artist and has been featured on albums by Clark, Vessel and Fever Ray.

She is also an active recording artist and has released records on both Bedroom Community as well as Cantaloupe Music.
