= The Last Panthers =

- Also known as: Panthers
- Genre: Action; Drama
- Created by: Jack Thorne
- Written by: Jack Thorne
- Directed by: Johan Renck
- Starring: Samantha Morton; Tahar Rahim; Goran Bogdan; John Hurt
- Theme music composer: David Bowie
- Opening theme: "Blackstar" by David Bowie
- Composer: Clark
- Country of origin: France
- Original languages: English; French; Serbian; Croatian
- No. of series: 1
- No. of episodes: 6

Production
- Production locations: London; Marseille; Belgrade; Montenegro
- Cinematography: Laurent Tangy
- Running time: 48 minutes
- Production company: Warp Films

Original release
- Network: Sky Atlantic (UK); Canal+ (France)
- Release: 12 November – 17 December 2015

The Last Panthers is a Franco-British crime drama television series created by Jack Thorne and directed by Johan Renck. It is a fictional story inspired by the notorious Balkan jewel thieves the Pink Panthers. The six-part series premiered on Canal+ on 26 October 2015 in France and on Sky Atlantic on 12 November 2015 in the UK, Ireland, Italy, Germany and Austria. It first aired in the US on SundanceTV in April 2016.

== Premise ==
The show opens with a diamond heist bearing a resemblance to those of a gang of thieves known as the Pink Panthers, before quickly delving into the dark heart of Europe where a shadowy alliance of gangsters and "banksters" now rule.

== Cast ==
- Samantha Morton as Naomi Franckom
- John Hurt as Tom Kendle
- Tahar Rahim as Khalil Rachedi
- Goran Bogdan as Milan Celik
- Camélia Jordana as Samira
- Corinne Masiero as The Judge
- Igor Benčina as Zlatko Mladić

== Music ==
On 6 October 2015, international news media announced that David Bowie had arranged his new track "Blackstar" as the theme song of the show, as well as introducing the listener to 45 seconds of the intro. The series director, Johan Renck, said of both the artist and the song; "The piece of music he laid before us embodied every aspect of our characters and the series itself: dark, brooding, beautiful and sentimental (in the best possible incarnation of this word). All along, the man inspired and intrigued me and as the process passed, I was overwhelmed with his generosity. I still can’t fathom what actually happened".

Rolling Stone magazine's Daniel Krep said that the tune reminded him "of the bleak, haunting instrumentals on the back half of Bowie's 1977 album "Heroes"", and The Guardian suggested the song revealed Bowie 'at his most brooding.'

The series score was composed by British electronic musician Clark, marking his debut television commission. As the series was co-produced by Warp Films, director Johan Renck drew on the label's roster, stating: "In scoring the series, it felt idiotic to not tap into one of the founding corners of Warp." Renck described Clark's approach: "Chris's sensibilities and brazen creativity was bang on for a score to deal with everything from the Biblical grandeur of the story, via brooding darkness all the way over to tender sentimentality. He had it covered." Clark recalled the project beginning "on a porch in Melbourne with a viola and a contact mic", and described extensively recording strings with contact microphones "passed through a mixing desk with tons of guitar pedals on it". Renck's creative direction pushed towards intensity: "He was basically just saying 'more satanic'", Clark recalled, before finding the score's melancholy.

Clark composed approximately 60 tracks for the six-episode series. The soundtrack album, released on 18 March 2016 on Warp Records, distilled these to 19 tracks alongside newly written material. Clark described editing the score into a standalone work: "I felt like I had to rescue it from being a conventional exposition of the music in the series, so I went on an immense chiselling/editing mission." The album received generally favourable reviews, with an aggregate score of 79 out of 100 on Metacritic.
