= Cut (advertisement) =

- print ad promoting Cut
- Agency: Grey London
- Client: Women's Aid
- Language: English
- Running time: 120 seconds
- Release date: 6 April 2009 (cinema)
- Directed by: Joe Wright
- Music by: "Vengeance Drools" by Clark
- Starring: Keira Knightley
- Production company: DAB Hand Media
- Produced by: Dominic Delaney
- Country: United Kingdom
- Official website: http://www.womensaid.org.uk/

Cut is a British advertising campaign launched in 2009 by the charitable organisation Women's Aid to promote awareness of domestic violence. The campaign was created by advertising agency Grey London, and centres on a 120-second commercial starring Keira Knightley. The commercial was supported by poster and online components. Cut was directed by Joe Wright and produced by Dominic Delaney. Post-production work was handled by Big Buoy and Prime Focus. The campaign drew a significant amount of media attention, especially after advertising approval body Clearcast prohibited the short film from appearing on even post-watershed television, due to several particularly violent scenes. The title of the piece refers to the filmmaking practice of cutting.

== Sequence ==
Cut opens with a young actress, played by Keira Knightley, leaving the set after a day's work. The actress drives home, wiping off her make-up in the car. When she arrives at her apartment, she calls to her boyfriend before finding a shattered mirror and a trail of blood across the floor into the kitchen. When she turns around, she sees her boyfriend's knuckles are bloodied and offers him a towel. He snaps it out of her hand. He then asks about the scenes with the leading man and whether her scenes with him "felt real". He cuts off her reply by throwing the towel back in her face and, when she tries to protest, strikes her to the ground and proceeds to yank her hair and kick her several times in the chest. The camera zooms out to reveal that the room is an otherwise empty set. The tagline "Isn't it time someone called Cut?" appears, followed by the statistic that two women die as a result of domestic abuse each week, and a request for a donation of £2 a month.

== Background and production ==
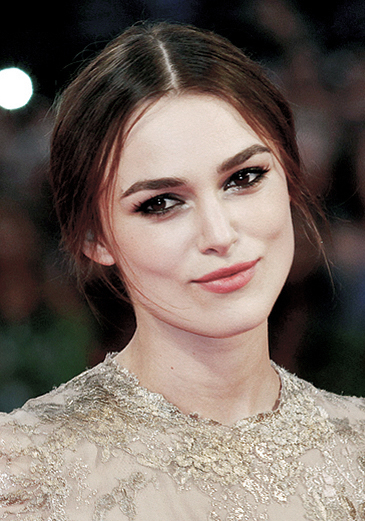
Keira Knightley

Since the appointment of advertising agency Grey London to handle the marketing of Women's Aid in 2005, they had worked on a number of publicity campaigns for the feminist charitable organisation. In 2006, their Valentine's Day campaign, with a budget of just £500, reached an estimated 52% of adults within the United Kingdom and generated editorial coverage worth an estimated €613,000. Comprising spots in print, posters, and radio, the campaign received wide critical acclaim, including an Aerial Award, a Euro Effie Award, and an IPA Effectiveness Award. The following year marked the launch of the What's it going to take? campaign. What's it going to take? centred on a series of images taken by British photographer Rankin, of a number of female British celebrities, including Anna Friel and Honor Blackman. Cosmetics were applied to the celebrities to give them the appearance of having been beaten. Noel Bussey of Campaign magazine said of the series: "Many agencies pull out their best work when it's for charity, but rarely is it this effective, so well shot or so close to the brief." Women's Aid went to win the 2007 Campaigning Team of the Year award at the Charity Times Gala Awards in London for the work surrounding the What's it going to take? campaign.

Keira Knightley had worked with director Joe Wright on a number of projects prior to Cut, including the feature films Pride & Prejudice and Atonement, and a 2008 television commercial for Chanel perfume. The pair volunteered their time for Cut at no charge, and convinced a team of around fifty others to do so as well. The assembled team included BAFTA-nominated make-up artist Ivana Primorac and cinematographer Seamus McGarvey, whose work with Wright on Atonement earned him an Academy Award nomination. Filming took place in January 2009, and the piece was intended to begin airing on 2 April.

== Release and reception ==
It was intended that Cut begin broadcasting simultaneously on post-watershed television and during trailers for 15-rated films in cinemas from 2 April 2009. However, when the commercial was sent for approval by Clearcast, the advertising authority refused permission for Cut to appear on British television either before or after the watershed. Clearcast advised that the final scene of Cut, in which Knightley's character is being kicked repeatedly by her boyfriend, was too violent and likely to cause offense, and therefore demanded that the scene be removed from the piece before it could be televised. Women's Aid refused to make the modifications, instead electing to eschew television and concentrate on the cinema, online, and print aspects of the campaign. Cut made its debut at cinemas on 6 April. Media space was donated by the cinema advertising companies Pearl & Dean, Digital Cinema Media, and Admedia. The ad also appeared online, both at a dedicated microsite and on video sharing website YouTube. This online component was backed up with a series of print advertisements created by Grey London creative director Nils Leonard.

The campaign was received well by the public. Within six days the film had over half a million hits online, swiftly rising to over a million. Of those who viewed Cut, only two wrote to complain to the Advertising Standards Authority. Clearcast's decision to block the piece from appearing on television was widely lambasted. Reactions by the media to the ad itself were mixed. Yasmin Alibhai-Brown of The Independent supported the piece, saying: "I know seeing her heroine Keira Knightley being knocked about by her lover will shake and wake my daughter up to this crime. Nothing I can say will have the same impact." However, Kira Cochrane of The Guardian was more critical, saying: "[O]nce the initial horror had passed, I was left wondering about the point of the ad. [...] [T]here's something about a celebrity being used to represent a domestic violence victim that makes me feel slightly queasy." It was also featured as one of the top ten celebrity advertisements of 2009 in Campaign magazine. Irrespective of these differing opinions, Cut has proven to be a financial and critical success. During the period in which the campaign ran in cinemas and print, metrics reported a 33% increase in awareness of the charity, and Women's Aid received a 50% rise in people looking to make a donation. The campaign was also shortlisted for a Cyber Lion at the Cannes Lions International Advertising Festival, considered one of the most prestigious awards in the advertising industry.
