= Vergano =

Vergano is an Italian surname. Notable people with the surname include:

- Aldo Vergano (1891–1957), Italian director, screenwriter and journalist
- Cristina Vergano (born 1960), Italian-American painter and designer
- Romana Maggiora Vergano (born 1997), Italian actress
- Serena Vergano (born 1943), Italian actress
