= Siân James (politician) =

Welsh Labour party politician

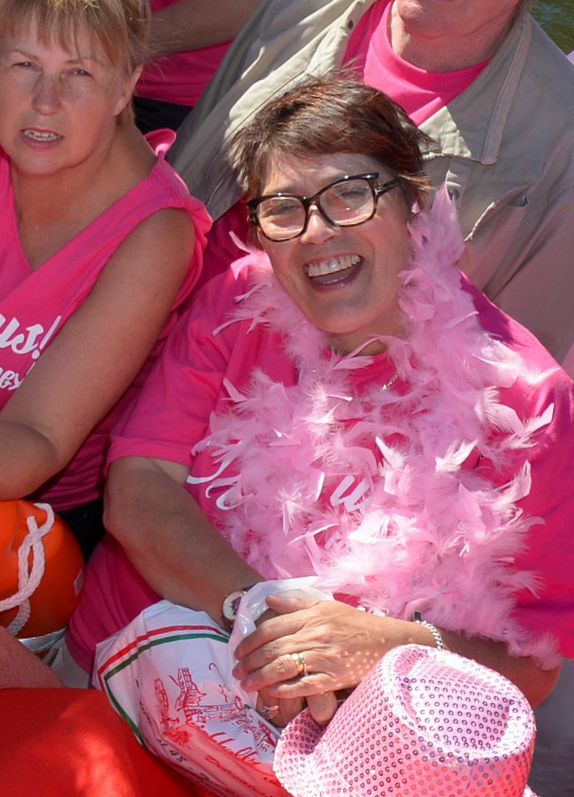
- Siân James at Amsterdam Gay Pride, 2016

Member of Parliament for Swansea East
- In office 5 May 2005 – 30 March 2015
- Preceded by: Donald Anderson
- Succeeded by: Carolyn Harris

Personal details
- Born: 24 June 1959 (age 67) Morriston, Glamorgan, Wales
- Party: Labour
- Education: Swansea University

Siân Catherine James (born 24 June 1959) is a Welsh Labour Party politician, who was Member of Parliament (MP) for Swansea East from 2005 to 2015.

== Early life ==
She spent most of her childhood in the Swansea Valley, where her parents ran a public house. She attended Cefn Saeson Comprehensive School on Afan Valley Road in Cimla, Neath. James married at age 16 and had two children by age 20. Living as a young housewife, James said: "As long as my lace curtains were the cleanest, my children immaculately dressed, their hand-knitted clothes made with love, I was happy."

During the 1984 miners' strike, James helped feed over 1,000 families a week from nine different centres. After the strike, James decided to take her A-Levels, before attending Swansea University. In the 2014 film Pride, Jessica Gunning portrays a young Siân James during the time of the miners' strike.

== Career ==
After raising her children, she attended Swansea University as a mature student, studying for a degree in the Welsh Language. She was heavily involved with the students' union and an enthusiastic member of the women's group.

After graduation, she worked for a series of organisations, with her final role before entering Parliament as Director of Welsh Women's Aid.

== Political career ==
As a young mother, James became involved in the family support networks surrounding the 1984 miners' strike, that were working to safeguard South Wales communities and the way of life. After the end of the strike, she became involved in women's rights campaigns.

In 2004 she resigned from the role in Welsh Women's Aid to stand as the Labour Party candidate in Swansea East. She was elected in May 2005 with a majority of 11,249 votes, the first woman to represent Swansea East and one of only eight women MPs from Wales.

After being elected to Parliament, James was Parliamentary private secretary to both Gareth Thomas, the Minister of State for Trade, and to Paul Murphy, the Welsh secretary, until resigning in March 2009. She cited overwork as the cause of her resignation but it also allowed her to sign the early day motion opposing the part privatisation of the Royal Mail.

On 25 February 2014, James announced her intention to stand down at the 2015 general election, saying that she wanted to spend more time campaigning out of Parliament. On 26 September 2014, James was one of 25 Labour MPs who broke party discipline to vote against renewed air strikes in Iraq.

She was placed number 1 on the South Wales West Labour list for the 2021 Senedd election. As Labour had taken all the constituency seats in the region, she was not elected.

Parliament of the United Kingdom
Preceded by Donald Anderson	Member of Parliament for Swansea East; 2005–2015	Succeeded by Carolyn Harris
