= List of statutory rules of Northern Ireland, 2015 =

This is a list of statutory rules made in the Northern Ireland in 2015.

== 1–100 ==
Number	Title
1	The Gas and Electricity Licence Modification and Appeals Regulations (Northern Ireland) 2015
2	The Housing Benefit (Executive Determinations) (Amendment) Regulations (Northern Ireland) 2015
3 (C. 1)	The Public Service Pensions (2014 Act) (Commencement No.2) Order (Northern Ireland) 2015
4	The Motor Vehicles (Driving Instruction) (Trainee Licence) (Amendment) Regulations (Northern Ireland) 2015
5	The Motor Vehicles (Driving Instruction) (Amendment) Regulations (Northern Ireland) 2015
6	The Motor Vehicles (Driving Licences) (Amendment) Regulations (Northern Ireland) 2015
7	The Firefighters’ Compensation Scheme (Amendment) Order (Northern Ireland) 2015
8	The Firefighters’ Pension Scheme (Amendment) Order (Northern Ireland) 2015
9	The New Firefighters’ Pension Scheme (Amendment) Order (Northern Ireland) 2015
10	The New Firefighters’ Pension Scheme (Amendment) (No. 2) Order (Northern Ireland) 2015
11	The Firefighters’ Pension Scheme (Amendment) (No. 2) Order (Northern Ireland) 2015
12	The Public Service Pensions (Employer Cost Cap) Regulations (Northern Ireland) 2015
13	The Level Crossing (Cullybackey South) Order (Northern Ireland) 2015
14	The Food Waste Regulations (Northern Ireland) 2015
15	Not Allocated
16	The Less Favoured Area Compensatory Allowances Regulations (Northern Ireland) 2015
17	The Transitional Payment to Disadvantaged Area Scheme (Northern Ireland) 2015
18	The Salaries (Assembly Ombudsman and Commissioner for Complaints) Order (Northern Ireland) 2015 (revoked)
19	The Housing Benefit (Income from earnings) (Amendment) Regulations (Northern Ireland) 2015
20	The Rates (Making and Levying of Different Rates) Regulations (Northern Ireland) 2015 (revoked)
21	The Waste (Fees and Charges) (Amendment) Regulations (Northern Ireland) 2015
22	The Donaghadee Harbour (Transfer of Harbour Undertaking) Order (Northern Ireland) 2015
23	The Motor Vehicles (Wearing of Seat Belts by Children in Front Seats) (Amendment) Regulations (Northern Ireland) 2015
24	The Motor Vehicles (Wearing of Seat Belts) (Amendment) Regulations (Northern Ireland) 2015
25 (C. 2)	The Planning (2011 Act) (Commencement No.2) Order (Northern Ireland) 2015
26	The Health and Personal Social Services (General Medical Services Contracts) (Amendment) Regulations (Northern Ireland) 2015
27	Provision of Health Services to Persons Not Ordinarily Resident Regulations (Northern Ireland) 2015
28 (C. 3)	The Local Government (2014 Act) (Commencement No. 3) Order (Northern Ireland) 2015
29	The Police (Northern Ireland) Act 2000 (Designated Places of Detention: Lay Visitors) Order 2015
30	The Rathdown Walk, Lisburn (Abandonment) Order (Northern Ireland) 2015
31	The Urban Clearways (Amendment) Order (Northern Ireland) 2015
32	The Valuation for Rating (Decapitalisation Rate) Regulations (Northern Ireland) 2015
33	The Parking Places on Roads (Disabled Persons’ Vehicles) Order (Northern Ireland) 2015
34	The Social Security (Miscellaneous Amendments) Regulations (Northern Ireland) 2015
35 (C. 4)	The Education (2014 Act) (Commencement No.1) Order (Northern Ireland) 2015
36	The Fair Employment (Specification of Public Authorities) (Amendment) Order (Northern Ireland) 2015 (revoked)
37	The Loading Bays on Roads (Amendment) Order (Northern Ireland) 2015
38	The Taxis (Antrim) Order (Northern Ireland) 2015
39	The Planning General Regulations (Northern Ireland) 2015
40	The Planning (Use Classes) Order (Northern Ireland) 2015
41	The Motor Vehicle Testing (Amendment) Regulations (Northern Ireland) 2015
42	The Public Service Vehicles (Amendment) Regulations (Northern Ireland) 2015
43	The Goods Vehicles (Testing) (Amendment) Regulations (Northern Ireland) 2015
44	The Local Government (Executive Arrangements) Regulations (Northern Ireland) 2015
45	The Water Framework Directive (Priority Substances and Classification) (Amendment) Regulations (Northern Ireland) 2015 (revoked)
46	The Rates (Owners Allowances) Order (Northern Ireland) 2015
47	The Rates (Exemption for Automatic Telling Machines in Rural Areas) Order (Northern Ireland) 2015 (revoked)
48	The Rates (Temporary Rebate) (Amendment) Order (Northern Ireland) 2015
49 (C. 5)	The Planning (2011 Act) (Commencement No.3) and (Transitional Provisions) Order (Northern Ireland) 2015
50	The Attorney General's Human Rights Guidance (Youth Justice Agency – Conditions of Detention) Order (Northern Ireland) 2015
51	The Attorney General's Human Rights Guidance (Probation Board for Northern Ireland) Order (Northern Ireland) 2015
52	The Social Security (Industrial Injuries) (Prescribed Diseases) (Amendment) Regulations (Northern Ireland) 2015
53	The Misuse of Drugs (Amendment) Regulations (Northern Ireland) 2015
54	The Misuse of Drugs (Designation) (Amendment) Order (Northern Ireland) 2015
55	The Inquiry into Historical Institutional Abuse (Amendment of Terms of Reference) Order (Northern Ireland) 2015
56	The Health and Personal Social Services (Superannuation), Health and Social Care (Pension Scheme) (Amendment) Regulations (Northern Ireland) 2015
57	The Child Maintenance (2008 Act) (Commencement No. 15) Order (Northern Ireland) 2015
58	The Planning (Claims for Compensation) Regulations (Northern Ireland) 2015
59	The One-Way Traffic (Belfast) (Amendment) Order (Northern Ireland) 2015
60	The Parking and Waiting Restrictions (Belfast) (Amendment) Order (Northern Ireland) 2015
61	The Planning (Hazardous Substances) Regulations (Northern Ireland) 2015 (revoked)
62	The Planning (Local Development Plan) Regulations (Northern Ireland) 2015
63	The Planning (Statement of Community Involvement) Regulations (Northern Ireland) 2015
64	The Pneumoconiosis, etc., (Workers’ Compensation) (Payment of Claims) (Amendment) Regulations (Northern Ireland) 2015
65	The Mesothelioma Lump Sum Payments (Conditions and Amounts) (Amendment) Regulations (Northern Ireland) 2015
66	The Planning (Control of Advertisements) Regulations (Northern Ireland) 2015
67	The Parking and Waiting Restrictions (Londonderry) Order (Northern Ireland) 2015
68	The Local Government Reorganisation (Compensation for Loss of Employment) Regulations (Northern Ireland) 2015
69	The Teachers’ Superannuation (Amendment) Regulations (Northern Ireland) 2015
70	The Planning (General Permitted Development) Order (Northern Ireland) 2015
71	The Planning (Development Management) Regulations (Northern Ireland) 2015
72	The Planning (General Development Procedure) Order (Northern Ireland) 2015
73	The Planning (Fees) Regulations (Northern Ireland) 2015
74	The Planning (Environmental Impact Assessment) Regulations (Northern Ireland) 2015
75	The Rates (Regional Rates) Order (Northern Ireland) 2015
76	The Judicial Pensions Regulations (Northern Ireland) 2015
77	The Local Government Pension Scheme (Governance) (Amendment) Regulations (Northern Ireland) 2015
78	The Firefighters' Pension Scheme Regulations (Northern Ireland) 2015
79	The Pension Protection Fund and Occupational Pension Schemes (Levy Ceiling) Order (Northern Ireland) 2015
80	The Employer's Liability (Compulsory Insurance) (Amendment) Regulations (Northern Ireland) 2015 (revoked)
81	The Public Service (Civil Servants and Others) Pensions (Consequential Provisions) Regulations (Northern Ireland) 2015
82	The Rates (Social Sector Value) (Amendment) Regulations (Northern Ireland) 2015 (revoked)
83	The Rates (Transitional Relief) Order (Northern Ireland) 2015
84	The Planning (Trees) Regulations (Northern Ireland) 2015
85	The Planning (Management of Waste from Extractive Industries) Regulations (Northern Ireland) 2015
86 (C. 7)	The Work and Families Act (Northern Ireland) 2015 (Commencement, Transitional Provisions and Savings) Order (Northern Ireland) 2015
87	The Paternity and Adoption Leave (Amendment) Regulations (Northern Ireland) 2015
88	The Social Security Contributions and Benefits (Northern Ireland) Act 1992 (Application of Parts 12ZA and 12ZB to Adoptions from Overseas) (Amendment) Regulations (Northern Ireland) 2015
89	The Statutory Paternity Pay and Statutory Adoption Pay (General) (Amendment) Regulations (Northern Ireland) 2015
90	The Social Security Contributions and Benefits (Northern Ireland) Act 1992 (Application of Parts 12ZA, 12ZB and 12ZC to Parental Order Cases) Regulations (Northern Ireland) 2015
91	The Statutory Shared Parental Pay (Administration) Regulations (Northern Ireland) 2015
92	The Statutory Paternity Pay and Statutory Adoption Pay (Parental Orders and Prospective Adopters) Regulations (Northern Ireland) 2015
93	The Shared Parental Leave Regulations (Northern Ireland) 2015
94	The Statutory Shared Parental Pay (General) Regulations (Northern Ireland) 2015
95	The Maternity and Adoption Leave (Curtailment of Statutory Rights to Leave) Regulations (Northern Ireland) 2015
96	The Statutory Adoption Pay (Curtailment) Regulations (Northern Ireland) 2015
97	The Employment Rights (Northern Ireland) Order 1996 (Application of Articles 107G and 107I to Adoptions from Overseas) Regulations (Northern Ireland) 2015
98	The Shared Parental Leave and Paternity and Adoption Leave (Adoptions from Overseas) Regulations (Northern Ireland) 2015
99	The Statutory Shared Parental Pay (Adoptions from Overseas) Regulations (Northern Ireland) 2015
100	The Employment Rights (Northern Ireland) Order 1996 (Application of Articles 107A, 107B, 107G, 107I, 112A and 112B to Parental Order Cases) Regulations (Northern Ireland) 2015

== 101–200 ==
Number	Title
101	The Paternity, Adoption and Shared Parental Leave (Parental Order Cases) Regulations (Northern Ireland) 2015
102	The Statutory Shared Parental Pay (Parental Order Cases) Regulations (Northern Ireland) 2015
103	The Statutory Shared Parental Pay (Persons Abroad and Mariners) Regulations (Northern Ireland) 2015
104	The Maternity and Parental Leave etc. (Amendment) Regulations (Northern Ireland) 2015
105	The Flexible Working Regulations (Northern Ireland) 2015
106	The Local Government (Accounts and Audit) Regulations (Northern Ireland) 2015
107	The Planning (Conservation Areas) (Demolition) Regulations (Northern Ireland) 2015
108	The Planning (Listed Buildings) Regulations (Northern Ireland) 2015
109	The Social Security (Claims and Payments) (Amendment) Regulations (Northern Ireland) 2015 (revoked)
110	The Waiting Restrictions (Castlederg) Order (Northern Ireland) 2015
111	The Social Security Revaluation of Earnings Factors Order (Northern Ireland) 2015
112	The Social Security Pensions (Low Earnings Threshold) Order (Northern Ireland) 2015
113	The Police Pensions Regulations (Northern Ireland) 2015
114	The Social Security Pensions (Flat Rate Accrual Amount) Order (Northern Ireland) 2015
115	The Occupational Pension Schemes (Levies) (Amendment) Regulations (Northern Ireland) 2015
116	The Child Support (Modification, Miscellaneous and Consequential Amendments) Regulations (Northern Ireland) 2015
117	The Guaranteed Minimum Pensions Increase Order (Northern Ireland) 2015
118	The Pensions (2005 Order) (Code of Practice) (Governance and Administration of Public Service Pension Schemes) (Appointed Day) Order (Northern Ireland) 2015
119	The Automatic Enrolment (Earnings Trigger and Qualifying Earnings Band) Order (Northern Ireland) 2015
120	The Health and Social Care Pension Scheme Regulations (Northern Ireland) 2015
121	The Health and Personal Social Services (Superannuation Scheme, Additional Voluntary Contributions and Injury Benefits), Health and Social Care (Pension Scheme) (Amendment) Regulations (Northern Ireland) 2015
122	The Health and Social Care Pension Scheme (Transitional and Consequential Provisions) Regulations (Northern Ireland) 2015
123	The Rates (Small Business Hereditament Relief) (Amendment) Regulations (Northern Ireland) 2015
124	The Social Security Benefits Up-rating Order (Northern Ireland) 2015 (revoked)
125	The Local Government (Transitional, Incidental, Consequential and Supplemental Provisions) Regulations (Northern Ireland) 2015
126	The Teachers’ Pensions (Miscellaneous Amendments) Regulations (Northern Ireland) 2015
127 (C. 8)	The Education (1998 Order) (Commencement No. 7) Order (Northern Ireland) 2015
128	The Plant Health (Amendment) Order (Northern Ireland) 2015
129	The Plant Health (Wood and Bark) (Amendment) Order (Northern Ireland) 2015 (revoked)
130	The Health Services (Cross-Border Health Care) (Amendment) Regulations (Northern Ireland) 2015 (revoked)
131	The Compulsory Right or Left-Hand Turn (Belfast) Order (Northern Ireland) 2015
132	The Road Races (Croft Hill Climb) Order (Northern Ireland) 2015
133	The Road Races (Circuit of Ireland Rally) Order (Northern Ireland) 2015
134	The A54 Ballymacombs Road, Portglenone (Abandonment) Order (Northern Ireland) 2015
135	The Agriculture (Student fees)(Amendment) Regulations (Northern Ireland) 2015 (revoked)
136	The Planning Fees (Deemed Planning Applications and Appeals) Regulations (Northern Ireland) 2015
137	The Planning Appeals Commission (Decisions on Appeals and Making of Reports) (Amendment) Rules (Northern Ireland) 2015
138	The Jobseeker's Allowance (Extended Period of Sickness) (Amendment) Regulations (Northern Ireland) 2015
139	The Social Security Benefits Up-rating Regulations (Northern Ireland) 2015 (revoked)
140	The Waiting Restrictions (Portadown) (Amendment) Order (Northern Ireland) 2015
141	The Superannuation (District Councils) Order (Northern Ireland) 2015
142	The Parking Places on Roads (Coaches) (Amendment) Order (Northern Ireland) 2015
143	The Police Act 1997 (Criminal Records) (Disclosure) (Amendment) Regulations (Northern Ireland) 2015
144	The Fair Employment and Treatment Order (Amendment) Regulations (Northern Ireland) 2015
145	The Sex Discrimination Order 1976 (Amendment) Regulations (Northern Ireland) 2015
146	The Shared Parental Leave and Statutory Shared Parental Pay (Consequential Amendments to Subordinate Legislation) Order (Northern Ireland) 2015
147	The Valuation (Telecommunications, Natural Gas and Water) (Amendment) Regulations (Northern Ireland) 2015
148	The Zoonoses (Fees) (Amendment) Regulations (Northern Ireland) 2015
149	The Maternity Allowance (Curtailment) Regulations (Northern Ireland) 2015
150	The Statutory Maternity Pay (Curtailment) Regulations (Northern Ireland) 2015
151	The General Teaching Council for Northern Ireland (Registration of Teachers) (Amendment) Regulations (Northern Ireland) 2015
152	The Whole of Government Accounts (Designation of Bodies) Order (Northern Ireland) 2015
153	The Social Security (Invalid Care Allowance) (Amendment) Regulations (Northern Ireland) 2015 (revoked)
154	The Occupational and Personal Pension Schemes (Disclosure of Information) (Amendment) Regulations (Northern Ireland) 2015
155	The Occupational Pension Schemes (Consequential and Miscellaneous Amendments) Regulations (Northern Ireland) 2015
156	The Police Pensions (Consequential Provisions) Regulations (Northern Ireland) 2015
157 (C. 9)	The Criminal Evidence (Northern Ireland) Order 1999 (Commencement No. 10) Order 2015
158 (C. 10)	The Justice (2011 Act) (Commencement No. 8) Order (Northern Ireland) 2015
159	The Insolvency (Northern Ireland) Order 2005 (Consequential Amendments) Order (Northern Ireland) 2015
160	The Local Government (Transferred Functions Grant) Regulations (Northern Ireland) 2015
161	The Public Service Pensions Act (Northern Ireland) 2014 (Judicial Offices) Order (Northern Ireland) 2015
162	The Local Government Pension Scheme (Amendment No. 2) Regulations (Northern Ireland) 2015
163	The Social Security (Miscellaneous Amendments No. 2) Regulations (Northern Ireland) 2015
164	The Occupational and Personal Pension Schemes (Transfer Values) (Amendment and Revocation) Regulations (Northern Ireland) 2015
165	The Pension Schemes Act 2015 (Transitional Provisions and Appropriate Independent Advice) Regulations (Northern Ireland) 2015
166	The Firefighters’ Pension Scheme (Consequential Provisions) Regulations (Northern Ireland) 2015
167	The Health Service Workers (Consequential Provisions) Regulations (Northern Ireland) 2015
168	The Justice (Northern Ireland) Act 2004 (Amendment of section 8(4)) Order (Northern Ireland) 2015
169	The Employment Rights (Increase of Limits) Order (Northern Ireland) 2015 (revoked)
170	The Teachers’ Pension Scheme (Consequential Provisions) Regulations (Northern Ireland) 2015
171	The Road Races (Cookstown 100) Order (Northern Ireland) 2015
172	The Road Races (Tandragee 100) Order (Northern Ireland) 2015
173	The Road Races (Craigantlet Hill Climb) Order (Northern Ireland) 2015
174	The Certificates of Alternative Development Value Regulations (Northern Ireland) 2015
175	The Planning (Avian Influenza) (Special Development) Order (Northern Ireland) 2015
176	The Planning General (Amendment) Regulations (Northern Ireland) 2015
177	The Planning (Conservation Areas) (Consultation) Regulations (Northern Ireland) 2015
178	The Human Medicines (Amendment) Regulations 2015
179	The Social Security (Contributions) (Republic of Chile) Order (Northern Ireland) 2015
180	The Pensions Increase (Review) Order (Northern Ireland) 2015
181	The Public Service (Civil Servants and Others) Pensions (Amendment) Regulations (Northern Ireland) 2015
182	The Conservation (Natural Habitats, etc.) (Amendment) Regulations (Northern Ireland) 2015
183	The Local Government (Constituting a Joint Committee a Body Corporate) Order (Northern Ireland) 2015
184	The Social Security (Members of the Reserve Forces) (Amendment) Regulations (Northern Ireland) 2015
185	The Employment and Support Allowance (Repeat Assessments and Pending Appeal Awards) (Amendment) Regulations (Northern Ireland) 2015
186	The Recovery of Health Services Charges (Amounts) (Amendment) Regulations (Northern Ireland) 2015
187	The Planning (Modification and Discharge of Planning Agreements) Regulations (Northern Ireland) 2015
188	The Planning (Simplified Planning Zones) Regulations (Northern Ireland) 2015
189	The Planning (Inquiry Procedure) Rules (Northern Ireland) 2015
190 (C. 11)	The Serious Crime (2015 Act) (Commencement) Regulations (Northern Ireland) 2015
191	The Common Agricultural Policy Basic Payment and Support Schemes Regulations (Northern Ireland) 2015
192	The Common Agricultural Policy (Control and Enforcement) Regulations (Northern Ireland) 2015
193 (C. 12)	The Legal Aid and Coroners’ Courts (2014 Act) (Commencement No. 1) Order (Northern Ireland) 2015
194 (C. 13)	The Access to Justice (2003 Order) (Commencement No. 7, Transitional Provisions and Savings) Order (Northern Ireland) 2015
195	The Civil Legal Services (General) Regulations (Northern Ireland) 2015
196	The Civil Legal Services (Financial) Regulations (Northern Ireland) 2015
197	The Civil Legal Services (Appeal) Regulations (Northern Ireland) 2015
198	The Civil Legal Services (Costs) Regulations (Northern Ireland) 2015
199	The Civil Legal Services (Cost Protection) Regulations (Northern Ireland) 2015
200	The Civil Legal Services (Statutory Charge) Regulations (Northern Ireland) 2015

=== 201–242 ===
Number	Title
201	The Civil Legal Services (Remuneration) Order (Northern Ireland) 2015
202	The Civil Legal Services (Disclosure of Information) Regulations (Northern Ireland) 2015
203	The Criminal Legal Aid (Disclosure of Information) Rules (Northern Ireland) 2015
204	Registered Rents (Increase) Order (Northern Ireland) 2015
205	The Health and Social Care (Disciplinary Procedures) (Amendment) Regulations (Northern Ireland) 2015 (revoked)
206 (C. 14)	The Pensions (2012 Act) (Commencement No. 5) Order (Northern Ireland) 2015
207	The Social Security (Application of Reciprocal Agreements with Australia, Canada and New Zealand) (EEA States and Switzerland) (Northern Ireland) Regulations 2015 (revoked)
208	The Statistics and Registration Service Act 2007 (Disclosure of Patient Registration Information) Regulations (Northern Ireland) 2015
209 (C. 15)	The Local Government (2014 Act) (Commencement No. 4) Order (Northern Ireland) 2015
210	The Local Government (Boundaries) (2008 Act) (Commencement, Transitional Provision and Savings) (Amendment) Order (Northern Ireland) 2015
211	The Social Security (Maternity Allowance) (Earnings) (Amendment) Regulations (Northern Ireland) 2015
212	The Road Races (Drumhorc Hill Climb) Order (Northern Ireland) 2015
213	The Time Off to Attend Adoption Appointments (Prospective Adopters) Regulations (Northern Ireland) 2015
214	The Road Races (Tour of the Sperrins Rally) Order (Northern Ireland) 2015
215	The Legal Aid for Crown Court Proceedings (Costs) (Amendment) Rules (Northern Ireland) 2015
216	The Social Fund Winter Fuel Payment (Amendment) Regulations (Northern Ireland) 2015
217	The One-Way Traffic (Belfast) (Amendment No. 2) Order (Northern Ireland) 2015
218	The Road Races (Spamount Hill Climb) Order (Northern Ireland) 2015
219	The Prohibition of Right-Hand Turn (Larne) Order (Northern Ireland) 2015
220	The Parkside Gardens, Belfast (Abandonment) Order (Northern Ireland) 2015
221	The Sliabh Dubh Glen and Sliabh Dubh View, Belfast (Footpath) (Abandonment) Order (Northern Ireland) 2015
222	The Parking and Waiting Restrictions (Newtownabbey) Order (Northern Ireland) 2015
223	The Health and Safety (Miscellaneous Repeals, Revocations and Amendments) Regulations (Northern Ireland) 2015
224	The General Teaching Council for Northern Ireland (Constitution) (Amendment) Regulations (Northern Ireland) 2015
225	The Police and Criminal Evidence (Northern Ireland) Order 1989 (Codes of Practice) Order 2015
226	The Road Races (North West 200) Order (Northern Ireland) 2015
227	The Misuse of Drugs (Amendment No. 2) Regulations (Northern Ireland) 2015
228	The Misuse of Drugs (Designation) (Amendment No.2) Order (Northern Ireland) 2015
229	The Ship Recycling Facilities Regulations (Northern Ireland) 2015
230 (C. 16)	The Public Authorities (Reform) (2009 Act) (Commencement No. 2) Order (Northern Ireland) 2015
231	The Environmental Liability (Prevention and Remediation) (Amendment) Regulations (Northern Ireland) 2015
232	The Parking and Waiting Restrictions (Antrim) Order (Northern Ireland) 2015
233	The Cycle Routes (Amendment) Order (Northern Ireland) 2015
234	The White Lodge Court, Greenisland (Abandonment) Order (Northern Ireland) 2015
235	The Rules of the Court of Judicature (Northern Ireland) (Amendment) 2015
236	The Explosives (Appointment of Authorities and Enforcement) Regulations (Northern Ireland) 2015
237 (C. 17)	The Access to Justice (2003 Order) (Commencement No. 8) Order (Northern Ireland) 2015
238	The Hazardous Waste (Amendment) Regulations (Northern Ireland) 2015 (revoked)
239	The Fisheries (Amendment) Regulations (Northern Ireland) 2015
240	The Off-Street Parking (Amendment) Order (Northern Ireland) 2015
241	The Crown Court (Amendment) Rules (Northern Ireland) 2015
242	The Motor Vehicles (Driving Licences) (Amendment No. 2) Regulations (Northern Ireland) 2015
243	The Student Fees (Amounts) (Amendment) Regulations (Northern Ireland) 2015 (revoked)
244	The Londonderry Harbour (Variation of Limits) Order (Northern Ireland) 2015
245	The Parking and Waiting Restrictions (Fivemiletown) (Amendment) Order (Northern Ireland) 2015
246	The Road Races (Cairncastle Hill Climb) Order (Northern Ireland) 2015
247	Energy (Amendment) Order (Northern Ireland) 2015
248	The Less Favoured Area Compensatory Allowances (Amendment) Regulations (Northern Ireland) 2015
249	The Electricity and Gas (Ownership Unbundling) Regulations (Northern Ireland) 2015
250	The Taxis (Lisburn) Order (Northern Ireland) 2015
251	The Loading Bays on Roads (Amendment No. 2) Order (Northern Ireland) 2015
252	The Footways (Prohibition of Waiting) Order (Northern Ireland) 2015
253	The Ballinderry Road/Glenavy Road, Lisburn (Stopping-Up) Order (Northern Ireland) 2015
254	The Biocidal Products (Fees and Charges) Regulations (Northern Ireland) 2015
255 (C. 18)	The Criminal Justice (Northern Ireland) Order 2008 (Commencement No. 8) Order 2015
256 (C. 19)	The Charities (2013 Act) (Commencement No. 1) Order (Northern Ireland) 2015
257 (C. 20)	The Taxis (2008 Act) (Commencement No. 4) (Amendment) Order (Northern Ireland) 2015
258	The Parking Places on Roads (Disabled Persons’ Vehicles) (Amendment) Order (Northern Ireland) 2015
259	The Human Medicines (Amendment) (No. 2) Regulations 2015
260	The Waiting Restrictions (Lisburn) Order (Northern Ireland) 2015
261	The Honey Regulations (Northern Ireland) 2015
262	The Insolvency (Amendment) Rules (Northern Ireland) 2015
263	The Parking Places, Loading Bay and Waiting Restrictions (Lisburn City Centre) Order (Northern Ireland) 2015
264	The Prohibition of Waiting (Amendment) Order (Northern Ireland) 2015
265	The Classification, Labelling and Packaging of Chemicals (Amendment) Regulations (Northern Ireland) 2015
266	The Optical Charges and Payments (Amendment) Regulations (Northern Ireland) 2015
267	The Waiting Restrictions (Clogher) Order (Northern Ireland) 2015
268	The Cycle Routes (Amendment No. 2) Order (Northern Ireland) 2015
269	The Traffic Weight Restriction (Amendment) Order (Northern Ireland) 2015
270	The Parking Places on Roads and Waiting Restrictions (Newry) Order (Northern Ireland) 2015
271	The Local Government Reorganisation (Compensation for Loss of Employment) (Amendment) Regulations (Northern Ireland) 2015
272	The Funded Public Service Pension Schemes (Reduction of Cash Equivalents) Regulations (Northern Ireland) 2015
273	The Planning (Development Management) (Amendment) Regulations (Northern Ireland) 2015
274	The Smoke Control Areas (Exempted Fireplaces) (Amendment) Regulations (Northern Ireland) 2015
275	The Parking and Waiting Restrictions (Belfast) (Amendment No. 2) Order (Northern Ireland) 2015
276	The Industrial Training Levy (Construction Industry) Order (Northern Ireland) 2015
277 (C. 21)	The Transport (2011 Act) (Commencement No.2) Order (Northern Ireland) 2015
278	The Controlled Drugs (Supervision of Management and Use) (Amendment) Regulations (Northern Ireland) 2015
279	The Marine Conservation (Fixed Monetary Penalties) Order (Northern Ireland) 2015
280	The Planning (Amount of Fixed Penalty) Regulations (Northern Ireland) 2015
281	The Social Security (Application of Reciprocal Agreements with Australia, Canada and New Zealand) ( EEA States and Switzerland) Regulations (Northern Ireland) 2015 (Revoked with saving)
282	The Non-Commercial Movement of Pet Animals (Amendment) Order (Northern Ireland) 2015
283	The Road Races (Armoy Motorcycle Race) Order (Northern Ireland) 2015
284 (C. 22)	The Transport (2011 Act) (Commencement No.3) Order (Northern Ireland) 2015
285	The Public Passenger Transport (Service Agreements and Service Permits) Regulations (Northern Ireland) 2015
286	The Common Agricultural Policy Direct Payments and Support Schemes (Cross Compliance) (Amendment) Regulations (Northern Ireland) 2015
287	The Renewables Obligation (Amendment) Order (Northern Ireland) 2015
288	The Hazardous Waste (Amendment No. 2) Regulations (Northern Ireland) 2015
289	The Local Government (Exclusion of Non-commercial Considerations) Order (Northern Ireland) 2015
290 (C. 23)	The Criminal Justice (Northern Ireland) Order 2008 (Commencement No. 9) Order 2015
291	The Road Races (POC NI Oils Stages Rally) Order (Northern Ireland) 2015
292	The Road Races (Ulster Grand Prix Bike Week) Order (Northern Ireland) 2015
293	The Roads (Speed Limit) Order (Northern Ireland) 2015
294	The Teachers’ Superannuation (Additional Voluntary Contributions) (Amendment) Regulations (Northern Ireland) 2015
295	The Roads (Speed Limit) (No. 2) Order (Northern Ireland) 2015
296 (C. 24)	The Criminal Justice (2013 Act) (Commencement No.5) Order (Northern Ireland) 2015
297	The Bus Lanes (Upper Newtownards Road, Belfast – between Sandown Road and Knock Road) Order (Northern Ireland) 2015
298	The Prohibition of U-Turn (A2 Belfast Road, Carrickfergus) Order (Northern Ireland) 2015
299	The Parking Places on Roads (Medical Practitioners) (Amendment) Order (Northern Ireland) 2015
300	The Parking and Waiting Restrictions (Belfast) (Amendment No. 3) Order (Northern Ireland) 2015

== 301–400 ==
Number	Title
301	The Waste Management Licensing (Amendment) Regulations (Northern Ireland) 2015
302	The Lands Tribunal (Amendment) Rules (Northern Ireland) 2015
303	The One-Way Traffic (Ballymena) (Amendment) Order (Northern Ireland) 2015
304	The Waiting Restrictions (Cookstown) Order (Northern Ireland) 2015
305	The Control of Traffic (Lisburn) Order (Northern Ireland) 2015
306	The A29 Moy Road and U7004 Drumcairn Road, Armagh (Abandonment) Order (Northern Ireland) 2015
307 (C. 25)	The Pensions (2015 Act) (Commencement No. 1) Order (Northern Ireland) 2015
308	The Pensions (2015 Act) (Consequential Amendments) (Units of Additional Pension) Order (Northern Ireland) 2015
309	The Occupational Pension Schemes (Charges and Governance) Regulations (Northern Ireland) 2015
310	The Occupational and Personal Pension Schemes (Automatic Enrolment) (Amendment) Regulations (Northern Ireland) 2015
311	The Social Security (Units of Additional Pension) Regulations (Northern Ireland) 2015
312	The Road Races (Ulster Rally) Order (Northern Ireland) 2015
313	The Road Races (Garron Point Hill Climb) Order (Northern Ireland) 2015
314	The Parking Places on Roads (Disabled Persons’ Vehicles) (Amendment No. 2) Order (Northern Ireland) 2015
315	The State Pension Regulations (Northern Ireland) 2015
316	The Parking Places and Waiting Restrictions (Ballymoney) Order (Northern Ireland) 2015
317	The Parking Places on Roads (Lisburn City Centre) Order (Northern Ireland) 2015
318	The Common Agricultural Policy (Review of Decisions) Regulations (Northern Ireland) 2015 (revoked)
319	The Pensions (2005 Order) (Code of Practice) (Funding Defined Benefits) (Appointed Day) Order (Northern Ireland) 2015
320 (C. 26)	The Justice (2015 Act) (Commencement No. 1) Order (Northern Ireland) 2015
321	The Country of Origin of Certain Meats Regulations (Northern Ireland) 2015
322	The Tuberculosis (Examination and Testing) Scheme (Amendment) Order (Northern Ireland) 2015
323	The Road Races (Bushwhacker Rally) Order (Northern Ireland) 2015
324 (C. 27)	The Justice (2015 Act) (Commencement No. 2) Order (Northern Ireland) 2015
325	The Control of Major Accident Hazards Regulations (Northern Ireland) 2015
326	The Rural Development Programme Regulations (Northern Ireland) 2015
327	The Local Government (Performance Indicators and Standards) Order (Northern Ireland) 2015
328	The Unfunded Public Service Defined Benefits Schemes (Transfers) Regulations (Northern Ireland) 2015
329 (C. 28)	The Pensions (2015 Act) (Commencement No. 2) Order (Northern Ireland) 2015
330	The Disclosure of Victims' and Witnesses' Information (Prescribed Bodies) Regulations (Northern Ireland) 2015
331	The State Pension Credit (Amendment) Regulations (Northern Ireland) 2015
332	The Animal By-Products (Enforcement) Regulations (Northern Ireland) 2015
333 (C. 29)	The Disability Discrimination Act 1995 (Commencement No. 11) Order (Northern Ireland) 2015
334	The Roads (Speed Limit) (No. 3) Order (Northern Ireland) 2015
335	The Parking and Waiting Restrictions (Cathedral Quarter, Belfast) (Amendment) Order (Northern Ireland) 2015
336	The Bus Lanes (Falls Road, Belfast – between Grosvenor Road and Whiterock Road) Order (Northern Ireland) 2015
337	The Parking and Waiting Restrictions (Dungannon) Order (Northern Ireland) 2015
338	The Prohibition of Waiting (Amendment No. 2) Order (Northern Ireland) 2015
339	The Genetically Modified Organisms (Contained Use) Regulations (Northern Ireland) 2015
340	The Brucellosis Control (Amendment) Order (Northern Ireland) 2015
341	The General Teaching Council for Northern Ireland (Constitution) (Amendment No. 2) Regulations (Northern Ireland) 2015
342	The Glebe Way, Moira (Abandonment) Order (Northern Ireland) 2015
343	The Parking and Waiting Restrictions (Banbridge) (Amendment) Order (Northern Ireland) 2015
344	The Planning (Hazardous Substances) (No. 2) Regulations (Northern Ireland) 2015
345	The Sexual Offences Act 2003 (Prescribed Police Stations) Regulations (Northern Ireland) 2015 (revoked)
346	The Renewables Obligation Closure Order (Northern Ireland) 2015
347	The Superannuation (Assembly Ombudsman for Northern Ireland and the Northern Ireland Commissioner for Complaints) Order (Northern Ireland) 2015 (revoked)
348	The Public Service Pensions (Assembly Ombudsman for Northern Ireland and the Northern Ireland Commissioner for Complaints) Regulations (Northern Ireland) 2015 (revoked)
349	The Road Traffic (Fixed Penalty) (Offences) (Amendment) Order (Northern Ireland) 2015
350	The Police Act 1997 (Criminal Records) (Amendments No. 2) Regulations (Northern Ireland) 2015
351	The Water Framework Directive (Classification, Priority Substances and Shellfish Waters) Regulations (Northern Ireland) 2015
352	The Snares Order (Northern Ireland) 2015
353	The Criminal Justice (European Protection Order) (Amendment) Regulations (Northern Ireland) 2015 (revoked)
354	The Human Medicines (Amendment) (No.3) Regulations 2015
355	The New Firefighters’ Pension Scheme (Amendment) (No. 3) Order (Northern Ireland) 2015
356	The Attorney General's Human Rights Guidance (Police Service of Northern Ireland – Protection of Life) Order (Northern Ireland) 2015
357	The Motor Vehicles (Driving Licences) (Amendment No. 3) Regulations (Northern Ireland) 2015
358 (C. 30)	The Justice (2015 Act) (Commencement No. 3) Order (Northern Ireland) 2015
359 (C. 31)	The Legal Aid and Coroners’ Courts (2014 Act) (Commencement No. 2) Order (Northern Ireland) 2015
360	The Police (Appeals, Conduct and Unsatisfactory Performance and Attendance) (Amendment) Regulations (Northern Ireland) 2015
361 (C. 32)	The Charities (2008 Act) (Commencement No. 6) Order (Northern Ireland) 2015
362	The Attorney General's Human Rights Guidance (Youth Justice Agency – Restorative Justice) Order (Northern Ireland) 2015
363	The Water Supply (Water Quality) (Amendment) Regulations (Northern Ireland) 2015 (revoked)
364	The Charities Act 2008 (Examination of Accounts) Order (Northern Ireland) 2015
365	The Natural Mineral Water, Spring Water and Bottled Drinking Water Regulations (Northern Ireland) 2015
366	The Private Water Supplies (Amendment) Regulations (Northern Ireland) 2015 (revoked)
367	The Smoke Control Areas (Authorised Fuels) (Amendment) Regulations (Northern Ireland) 2015
368	The Rules of the Court of Judicature (Northern Ireland) (Amendment No. 2) 2015
369	The Nitrates Action Programme (Amendment) Regulations (Northern Ireland) 2015 (revoked)
370	The Victim Charter (Justice Act (Northern Ireland) 2015) Order (Northern Ireland) 2015
371	The Renewable Heat Incentive Schemes (Amendment) Regulations (Northern Ireland) 2015
372	The Occupational Pension Schemes (Power to Amend Schemes to Reflect Abolition of Contracting-out) Regulations (Northern Ireland) 2015
373	The U125 Old Grand Jury Road, Saintfield (Abandonment) Order (Northern Ireland) 2015
374	The U6076 Cloghanramer Road, Newry (Abandonment) Order (Northern Ireland) 2015
375	The Roads (Speed Limit) (No. 4) Order (Northern Ireland) 2015
376 (C. 33)	The Human Trafficking and Exploitation (2015 Act) (Commencement No.1) Order (Northern Ireland) 2015
377	The Cycle Routes (Amendment No. 3) Order (Northern Ireland) 2015
378	The Parking Places and Waiting Restrictions (Belfast City Centre) Order (Northern Ireland) 2015
379	The Prohibition of Waiting (Schools) Order (Northern Ireland) 2015
380	The Parking Places on Roads (Disabled Persons’ Vehicles) (Amendment No. 3) Order (Northern Ireland) 2015
381	The Parking and Waiting Restrictions (Belfast) (Amendment No. 4) Order (Northern Ireland) 2015
382	The Bus Lanes (Upper Newtownards Road, Belfast – between Sandown Road and Knock Road) (Amendment) Order (Northern Ireland) 2015
383 (C. 34)	The Charities (2008 Act) (Commencement No. 7) Order (Northern Ireland) 2015
384	The Charities (Accounts and Reports) Regulations (Northern Ireland) 2015
385	The Charities Act 2008 (Substitution of Sums) Order (Northern Ireland) 2015
386	The Waste Management Licensing (Amendment No.2) Regulations (Northern Ireland) 2015
387	The Storage of Carbon Dioxide (Licensing etc.) Regulations (Northern Ireland) 2015
388	The Storage of Carbon Dioxide (Access to Infrastructure) Regulations (Northern Ireland) 2015
389 (C. 35)	The Taxis (2008 Act) (Commencement No. 5) Order (Northern Ireland) 2015
390	The Clifton Street/Carrick Hill, Belfast (Footway) (Abandonment) Order (Northern Ireland) 2015
391	The Loading Bays on Roads (Amendment No. 3) Order (Northern Ireland) 2015
392	The Carnbane Road, Newry (Abandonment) Order (Northern Ireland) 2015
393	The Taxi Licensing Regulations (Northern Ireland) 2015
394	The Taxis (Taximeters, Devices and Maximum Fares) Regulations (Northern Ireland) 2015
395	The Taxi Operators Licensing (Amendment) Regulations (Northern Ireland) 2015
396	The Taxi Accessibility Regulations (Northern Ireland) 2015
397	The Road Vehicles Lighting (Amendment) Regulations (Northern Ireland) 2015
398	The Planning (Fees) (Amendment) Regulations (Northern Ireland) 2015
399	The European Maritime and Fisheries Fund (Financial Assistance) Regulations (Northern Ireland) 2015
400	The Parking and Waiting Restrictions (Strabane) Order (Northern Ireland) 2015

=== 401–436 ===
Number	Title
401	The Waiting Restrictions (Portballintrae) Order (Northern Ireland) 2015
402	The Payment of Pension Levies for Past Periods Regulations (Northern Ireland) 2015
403	The Occupational Pensions (Revaluation) Order (Northern Ireland) 2015
404	The Social Security (Crediting and Treatment of Contributions, and National Insurance Numbers) (Amendment) Regulations (Northern Ireland) 2015
405	The Firearms (Variation of Fees) Order (Northern Ireland) 2015
406	The Smoke Control Areas (Exempted Fireplaces) (Amendment No.2) Regulations (Northern Ireland) 2015
407	The Disabled Persons (Badges for Motor Vehicles) (Amendment) Regulations (Northern Ireland) 2015
408	The Common Agricultural Policy (Review of SCMO Decisions) Regulations (Northern Ireland) 2015
409	The Control of Traffic (Alfred Street/Upper Arthur Street, Belfast) Order (Northern Ireland) 2015
410	The Parking Places and Waiting Restrictions (Alfred Street/Upper Arthur Street, Belfast) Order (Northern Ireland) 2015
411	The Pensions (2015 Act) (Consequential, Supplementary and Incidental Amendments) Order (Northern Ireland) 2015
412	The HIV Testing Kits and Services (Revocation) Regulations (Northern Ireland) 2015
413	The Control of Traffic (Albert Street/Durham Street/College Square North, Belfast) Order (Northern Ireland) 2015
414	The Parking Places on Roads (Coaches) Order (Northern Ireland) 2015
415	The Rules of the Court of Judicature (Northern Ireland) (Amendment No. 3) 2015
416	The Roads (Speed Limit) (No. 5) Order (Northern Ireland) 2015
417	The Concession Road, Route A37, Clonalig (Part-Time 20 mph Speed Limit) Order (Northern Ireland) 2015
418 (C. 36)	The Justice (2015 Act) (Commencement No. 4) Order (Northern Ireland) 2015
419	The Police Service of Northern Ireland (Amendment) Regulations 2015
420	The Firefighters’ Pension Scheme (Transitional and Consequential Provisions) Regulations (Northern Ireland) 2015
421	The Firefighters’ Pension Scheme (Amendment) (No. 3) Order (Northern Ireland) 2015
422	The Firefighters’ Compensation Scheme (Amendment) (No. 2) and the New Firefighters’ Pension Scheme (Amendment) (No. 4) Order (Northern Ireland) 2015
423	The Parking Places on Roads and Waiting Restrictions (Newry) (Amendment) Order (Northern Ireland) 2015
424	The Parking Places on Roads (Disabled Persons’ Vehicles) (Amendment No. 4) Order (Northern Ireland) 2015
425	The Fluorinated Greenhouse Gases Regulations (Northern Ireland) 2015

== See also ==
- List of acts of the Northern Ireland Assembly from 2015
- List of acts of the Parliament of the United Kingdom from 2015
