= Radiovision =

Radiovision can refer to:

- Television (an early name used by Charles Francis Jenkins for the technology)
- A BBC radio educational program for schools that was distributed with slides and films
- A subsidiary company called Radiovision Broadcast International which was formed in 1966 by Pearl & Dean, originally to represent the marketing interests of American Broadcasting Company in Europe
