= Human Trafficking and Exploitation (Criminal Justice and Support for Victims) Act (Northern Ireland) 2015 =

Act of the Northern Ireland Assembly

Human Trafficking and Exploitation (Criminal Justice and Support for Victims) Act (Northern Ireland) 2015 (Note: Section 28(1).)
- Act of the Northern Ireland Assembly
- Northern Ireland Assembly
- Long title: An Act to make provision about human trafficking, slavery and other forms of exploitation, including measures to prevent and combat such exploitation and to provide support for victims of such exploitation; and for connected purposes.
- Citation: 2015 c. 2
- Introduced by: Maurice Morrow MLA
- Territorial extent: Northern Ireland

Dates
- Royal assent: 13 January 2015
- Commencement: 27 November 2015, 1 April 2016
Other legislation
Amends	Immigration Act 1971; Criminal Justice Act 1988; Violent Crime Reduction Act 2006
Amended by	Policing and Crime Act 2017; Sentencing Act 2020; Employment Rights Act 2025

Status: Amended

Text of statute as originally enacted

Revised text of statute as amended

Text of the Human Trafficking and Exploitation (Criminal Justice and Support for Victims) Act (Northern Ireland) 2015 as in force today (including any amendments) within the United Kingdom, from legislation.gov.uk.

The Human Trafficking and Exploitation (Criminal Justice and Support for Victims) Act (Northern Ireland) 2015 (c. 2 (N.I.)) received royal assent on 13 January 2015 and implements the Nordic model approach to prostitution in Northern Ireland.

== Legislative history ==
Justice Minister, David Ford, who had earlier commissioned a study of the issue, expressed his opposition to clause 6, as did the police. The commissioned research was carried out by Queen's University Belfast. The Catholic Church supported the legislation, alongside the Irish Congress of Trade Unions, and many women's groups such as Women's Aid and Equality Now. Since it resembles legislation enacted in Sweden, a public debate on the merits of that law ensued, in addition to discussion as to what the state of affairs in Northern Ireland actually was. The DUP consistently backed the proposal to criminalise the purchase of sex in Northern Ireland. Despite initial scepticism, Sinn Féin, the Social Democratic and Labour Party, the Ulster Unionist Party, and the Traditional Unionist Voice all voted in favour of criminalisation. Only the Alliance Party, the Green Party, and NI21 opposed it. The Bill appeared to have public support, according to an October 2014 poll carried out by CARE.

Paying for sexual services of a person

6.—(1) The Sexual Offences (Northern Ireland) Order 2008 is amended as follows.

(2) For Article 64A (Paying for sexual services of a prostitute subjected to force etc.) substitute—

"64A Paying for sexual services of a person

(1) A person (A) commits an offence if A obtains sexual services from a person (B) over the age of 18 in exchange for payment—

(a) if the payment is made or promised by A; or

(b) if the payment is made or promised by a third party.

(2) Person A guilty of an offence under this article is liable—

(a) on summary conviction to a fine not exceeding level 3 on the standard scale;

(b) to imprisonment for a term not exceeding one year or a fine not exceeding the statutory maximum, or both.

(3) In paragraph (1), "payment" means any financial advantage, including the discharge of an obligation to pay or the provision of goods or services (including sexual services) gratuitously or at a discount.

(4) For the avoidance of doubt, person B is not guilty of aiding, abetting or counselling the commission of an offence under this article.

(5) Within the first year of this offence coming into effect, the Department must raise awareness of this offence.

(6) The Department shall collect data to review the operation of this offence and report to the Assembly after this offence has been in effect for three years.".

The bill passed First Reading in June 2013, and Second Reading on 24 September 2013. Submissions closed on 1 November 2013. The committee reported on 10 April 2014, with members divided on clause 6. The Justice Department continued to be opposed to clause 6. Amendments were anticipated and introduced in October 2014, with the final consideration debate on 20 October. The vote on clause 6 was 81:10 to approve it. 95% of the Human Trafficking and Exploitation Act 2015 came into effect on royal assent, but the criminalisation of the purchase of sex did not come into effect until 1 June 2015.

In September 2016, sex worker and law graduate Laura Lee brought a case to the Belfast High Court to re-evaluate the current prostitution laws in Northern Ireland, and to repeal Lord Morrow's law that made the purchase of sex illegal in 2015. The hearing had been granted for a judicial review, and the date was to be announced. Following the death of Laura Lee on 7 February 2017, the legal challenge was withdrawn.

Figures released by the Public Prosecution Service (PPS) in August 2016, showed that 10 men had been arrested under this legislation since it was introduced. Seven were referred to the PPS. Of those, no action was taken three cases, two men received cautions and the remaining two cases were being considered by a senior prosecutor. The first prosecution for paying for the services of a prostitute was on 27 October 2017 in Dungannon Magistrates Court. District Judge John Meehan was due to hear the case at a later date.

== Details ==
In 2015, Northern Ireland criminalised the purchase of sex.

== Impact ==
In 2019, in a study that was funded by the Department of Justice it was suggested that an observed spike in demand for sex work was due to the debate around the bill had publicising sex work to people who had never considered it before.

Later a review by Queen's University Belfast found that the overall demand for sex had in fact increased, that prostitutes felt less safe.

The law was opposed by campaigners who wished to see the total decriminalisation of sex work. An application for judicial review failed on the death of the campaigner who had proposed it.

== See also ==
- Nordic model approach to prostitution
- Prostitution in Northern Ireland
