= What's it going to take? =

British advertising campaign

The nine photographs produced for the campaign. Top row (L-R): Honor Blackman, Fern Britton, Fiona Bruce Middle row (L-R): Anne-Marie Duff, Anna Friel, Jemma Kidd Bottom row (L-R): Miquita Oliver, Fay Ripley, Kate Thornton

What's it going to take? is a British print and poster campaign launched in 2007 by Women's Aid to boost awareness of domestic violence against women in the United Kingdom. The campaign, handled by advertising agency Grey London, comprised photographs of nine female celebrities made-up to appear as though they were the victims of domestic abuse. The campaign received substantial media attention, with commentary appearing in The Daily Mail, This Morning, and Marie Claire, among others. The What's it going to take? campaign went on to win a number of honours within the advertising industry, including prizes at the 2008 Creative Circle Awards and the Aerial Awards.

== Background ==
Women's Aid was established in 1974 as an umbrella organisation for several feminist charities aiming to end domestic violence against women and children, including molestation, rape, and sexual harassment. For the next thirty years, the organisation worked with a number of advertising agencies to promote its cause, including Ogilvy & Mather, McCann Erickson, and Mediaedge:cia. However, despite numerous publicity campaigns over the years, by 2005 the charity's own research suggested that less than 16% of the public were aware of the existence of Women's Aid. Through a personal relationship between a pair of employees at the two organisations, Women's Aid were taken on as a pro-bono client by agency Grey London in 2005.

The first product of this new collaboration was the 2006 Valentine's Day campaign. With a budget of £500, Grey London made strategic purchases of media space in newspapers and radio with a reach of about 2% of the UK population. Through an effective public relations campaign, this exposure was leveraged to the point where 52% of British adults saw the advertisements at least once. The campaign went on to win a number of awards in the advertising community, including an EFFIE Award for Socially Responsible Advertising and an IPA Effectiveness Award. Moreover, the campaign was financially successful. Women's Aid recorded an increase of 25% in traffic to their website and a substantial increase in the number of donations following Valentine's Day's run.

== Campaign ==
Looking to build upon the success of Valentine's Day, Grey London began planning for a new campaign to run in early 2007. The brief for the campaign was to bring the issue into public view by making use of celebrities. In an interview with Creativity magazine, a planner for the agency said: "The amount of column inches and time spent talking about celebrities is phenomenal and if we could own even a small piece of this it would help to raise awareness of domestic violence and also Women's Aid. In this gossip driven world if we thought a celebrity was suffering from a form of domestic abuse EVERYONE would be talking about it." From this came the idea of a series of portraits of female celebrities made-up to appear as though they had been the victims of abuse. Grey London recruited fashion photographer Rankin, known for his portraits of politicians and celebrities including Tony Blair, Kylie Minogue, and Queen Elizabeth II, to conduct the shoot.

The team approached a number of women to star in the campaign but, due to scheduling conflicts and the lack of a campaign budget, securing dates for the photo-shoot proved difficult. In all, nine female celebrities, across a wide range of ages and ethnicities, were chosen: Honor Blackman, veteran actress and former Bond girl; Fern Britton, presenter of daytime television show This Morning; Fiona Bruce, newsreader for BBC News; Anne-Marie Duff, known for playing Fiona Gallagher on television drama Shameless; Anna Friel, known for playing Beth Jordache on the soap opera Brookside; Jemma Kidd, former fashion model; Miquita Oliver, television and radio personality; Fay Ripley, known for playing Jenny Gifford in the comedy drama series Cold Feet; and Kate Thornton, journalist and television presenter. The head and shoulder prosthetics were created by Nigel Booth, whose previous work includes prosthetic and make-up design on feature films such as The English Patient and Blade II.

The launch of the campaign on 1 February 2007 was celebrated with a launch party at 11 Downing Street hosted by then-Chancellor of the Exchequer Gordon Brown and his wife Sarah. All appearances in magazines, newspapers, posters, on television and on radio were donated free of charge, as was the work of the featured celebrities, photographer, and the advertising agency. In all, the campaign received an estimated £30m of media exposure, including an eight-page feature in women's magazine Marie Claire with an editorial written by Marian Keyes.

=== Reaction ===
There was mixed reception to the campaign. Some were impressed with the impact of the images, such as Noel Bussey of Campaign magazine, who said: "Many agencies pull out their best work when it's for charity, but rarely is it this effective, so well shot or so close to the brief. The images of battered female celebrities are bound to pick up coverage outside of the original media, and will not fail in raising awareness about the sickening problem of domestic violence."

Others felt that the use of celebrities diminished the relevance of the message; Roisin Donnelly of Procter & Gamble commented: "In this print campaign, the celebrities, complete with injuries provided by the make-up artist, do get attention, but it seemed like it was a trick just to get attention, and was focused more on the celebrity and fake make-up rather than the central issue of domestic violence."

Others were confused as to the point of the campaign; Kira Cochrane of The Guardian commented: "The images were arresting, but odd. I can't imagine celebrity women posing as other sorts of victim: presenting themselves as trafficked women to highlight forced prostitution, or as rape victims to underline the low conviction rate. And what were the images supposed to tell us: that domestic violence is bad? Painful? Causes serious bruising?"

In all, the campaign proved a moderate success. Grey London reported that at the height of publicity for the campaign, more than 67% of the British public were aware of Women's Aid and its goals. The What's it going to take? campaign went on to win a number of awards from the advertising and charitable communities, including an Aerial Award for the radio component, a Silver Award at the 2008 Creative Circle Awards for the print component, and Women's Aid were honoured as the Campaigning Team of the Year at the Charity Times Gala Awards.

As of 2010, Grey London continues to produce work for Women's Aid; later in 2007, they collaborated again with Rankin to produce a second series of posters for the Valentine's Day campaign. In 2009 they continued to make use of celebrity to promote domestic abuse awareness, releasing a promotion starring Keira Knightley, titled Cut. The video, banned by the advertising standards agency Clearcast from appearing on British television, was only shown online, backed by a print campaign pointing people to the website.
