= Hive Minds =

British game show

- Genre: Quiz show
- Presented by: Fiona Bruce
- Country of origin: United Kingdom
- Original language: English
- No. of series: 2
- No. of episodes: 26

Production
- Running time: 30 minutes
- Production companies: Green Inc. Film & Television and Saltbeef TV

Original release
- Network: BBC Four
- Release: 14 July 2015 – 1 December 2016

Hive Minds is a British television quiz show that aired on BBC Four from 14 July 2015 to 1 December 2016. It was hosted by journalist Fiona Bruce.

== Background ==
Hive Minds was developed by Saltbeef TV - a production firm responsible for CBBC's Friday Download - with co-production from Green Inc Film & Television. It was intended as a replacement for Only Connect, which had been moved to BBC Two. It was filmed at the Lyric Theatre, Belfast and was hosted by Fiona Bruce, who fronts the BBC News at Six, BBC News at Ten, Crimewatch, Call My Bluff and Antiques Roadshow.

== Gameplay ==
Players must first work out the answers to questions and then find the answers hidden in a hexagonal "hive" of letters.

=== Round 1 ===
Two teams of three play the game. For this round, each team faces four hives each; they must find an answer embedded into the hive. They have twenty seconds to find it, and five points are on offer; after two seconds hexagons start disappearing from the hive. Once another two have elapsed, the hive is worth a point less and decreases in value every four seconds. After another eighteen seconds and eighteen hexagons have elapsed, the time expires and Bruce offers the hive to the other team, who may earn a bonus point by answering the grid. Once each team has cleared two hives each, they have to find two related answers from the same hive.

=== Round 2 ===
For this round, each team faces two hives; five are offered, and teams take it in turns to select categories. One hive remains unpicked. The teams must find three answers hidden within each hive; the players are separated, and each player has to get one answer. Play then passes to the next player. Each team then has two passes; if any player gets a wrong answer, the whole team is locked out of the hive. Each correct answer is worth one point, and two bonus points are awarded if all three answers are found, for a total of five points.

=== Round 3 ===
The teams each try to make one perfect hive out of one super hive (basically a slightly larger hive) out of answers. Humour is made out of the fact that the two hives are called the A-hive and the B-hive. They must find multiple answers on a single question. Every answer found is worth a point; a perfect hive is worth ten.

=== Round 4 ===
This is a quickfire round. Both teams are handed a hive, and each team try to find answers from that grid. Every correct question gains a point; every wrong answer loses a point. At the end of this round, the team with the highest number of points wins and goes forward. In the case of a tie, one more question is asked. At the end of the show, Bruce offers one hive to the viewers, and once the credits have finished, the answer is revealed.

== Tournament format ==
The show featured teams playing in a double elimination tournament with occasional wild card spots, with the series winners getting a special trophy at the end, similar to Only Connect.

== Reception ==
The first episode pulled in 505,000 viewers; the show it replaced, Only Connect, pulled in 209,000 in its first episode. Michael Hogan in The Daily Telegraph gave the quiz a mixed review. While the questions were described as "enjoyably eclectic", and Fiona Bruce "clearly enjoyed the opportunity to flex her funny muscles", overall Hogan felt that it was "a tad too stiff and niche in appeal, while the “hive” gimmick seemed over-stretched. This bee-themed quiz needs a bit more buzz".

== Transmissions ==
Series	Start date	End date	Episodes
1	14 July 2015	7 October 2015	13
2	8 September 2016	1 December 2016	13
