= Pearl & Dean Ireland =

Irish cinema advertising agency

Mepro Limited
- Formerly: Carlton Screen Advertising Wide Eye Media
- Industry: Cinema Advertising
- Founded: 1996; 30 years ago
- Headquarters: Dublin
- Key people: Dermot Hanrahan

Mepro Limited, trading as Pearl & Dean Ireland, formerly known as Carlton Screen Advertising and Wide Eye Media, is a cinema advertising company in Ireland. The company is owned by SGO Products Ltd and is a sister company to Pearl & Dean.

== History ==
The company, Carlton Screen Advertising, was established in 1996 when Carlton Communications purchased the cinema advertising company Cinema Media (formerly RSA), then owned by a venture capital company backed by Shroeders, who had bought Rank Screen Advertising from the then beleaguered Rank Group and renamed it eponymously. The Rank Organization, after making a deal to buy Mecca Bingo Halls, was forced to sell the family silver and first Rank Screen Advertising then Rank Films were sold off followed later by even their prized Odeon circuit itself. After the purchase of Rank Screen Advertising, Shroeders netted a multi-million pound profit in just three years. However the high purchase price and the increasingly onerous terms of business with the cinema exhibitors led to its eventual sale by ITV to Cineworld and Odeon.

On 2 February 2004 Carlton Communications merged with Granada plc to create ITV plc, following which the Carlton name was dropped from all other uses.

Until its break-up in 2008, Carlton Screen Advertising was the largest cinema advertising company in the UK. A tough advertising climate in the mid-2000s saw it struggle to make a profit and it was sold on when ITV made the decision to focus on core assets.

=== Break-up and sale ===
The company's UK and Irish operations were separated on 11 July 2008, when Cineworld Group plc and Odeon Cinemas acquired a 65% majority stake in the UK operation. By 2008, this was rebranded as Digital Cinema Media.

The Irish operation remained as Carlton Screen Advertising, and continued to be wholly owned by ITV plc until May 2009, when it was sold to an Irish Media group with Media Entrepreneur Dermot Hanrahan becoming the Chairman. It continued to use the Carlton branding and on-screen ident until 6 March 2014.

=== 2014 rebrand ===
On 6 March 2014, as part of a €2 million investment, Carlton Screen Advertising rebranded themselves as Wide Eye Media, which uses digital technology instead of 35mm, which will be used in their 643 screens across Ireland.

In July 2015, the parent of Wide Eye Media purchased London based Pearl and Dean, with Dermot Hanrahan assuming the position of Chairman. Both companies now control 28% of the cinema market in Ireland and the UK and the only operator active in both Ireland and the UK.

=== 2022 rebrand ===
In September 2022, Wide Eye Media rebranded to Pearl and Dean Ireland.

== Ident ==
The ident for Carlton Screen Advertising was the first clip to play in a cinema, and consisted of the trademark Carlton star as a brand being put into flames for a few moments, before being removed and thrusted at the screen. While done by Lambie-Nairn, the same firm that commissioned Carlton's TV idents at the time, the Carlton Screen Advertising ident was often considered frightening compared to its TV compatriots due to its loud, powerful sounds and visuals of flames. The closing ident at the end of the advertising reel would simply display the Carlton star with its flames fizzling out into smoke. The Carlton idents were also rather similar to a former cinema commercial for Levi's Jeans produced by Bartle Bogle Hegarty which used the same branding imagery.

The ident for Wide Eye Media features a journey through an eye before the slogan "See it. Hear it. Feel it." would appear.

== See also ==
- ITV plc
- Digital Cinema Media
