= The Queen's Palaces =

- Genre: Documentary
- Written by: Fiona Bruce
- Directed by: Ian Leese (1,2); Deborah Lees (3)
- Presented by: Fiona Bruce
- Composers: Chris Nicolaides; John Chilton; Peter Linlor
- Country of origin: United Kingdom
- Original language: English
- No. of series: 1
- No. of episodes: 3

Production
- Executive producer: Basil Comely
- Producers: Ian Leese (1,2); Deborah Lees (3)
- Running time: 55-60 mins
- Production company: BBC Production

Original release
- Network: BBC
- Release: 12 September – 26 September 2011

The Queen's Palaces is a 2011 documentary in three parts written and presented by Fiona Bruce that tells the story of the Queen's three official residences, Buckingham Palace, Windsor Castle, and the Palace of Holyroodhouse which are amongst the few working royal palaces in the world today.

== Episode one: Buckingham Palace ==
Bruce charts the history of the palace from its days as a hunting forest for Henry VII and a mulberry garden of James I. Buckingham House was built in 1703 for the Duke of Buckingham, and it was later purchased in 1761 by George III for his wife Charlotte and 14 of their 15 children were born there. George removed many of the ornate features but invested heavily in art from Europe. George IV wanted a grander building and with architect John Nash transformed the house into a palace, full of art and sculpture. By the time of his death, the project had overspent its budget by four times, and it was proposed to use it instead as a replacement parliament building. In 1837 Queen Victoria moved in and when she married Prince Albert they commissioned Edward Blore to move the Marble Arch and build a new wing across the front, which included the now-famous balcony, as well as a new ballroom. On Albert's death in 1861 Victoria retired and rarely used the palace. On her death Edward VII remodeled many rooms and installed toilets. In 1913 the last major work was when George V had the front refaced in white Portland stone, and during World War II it received minor bomb damage.

== Episode two: Windsor Castle ==
Bruce charts Windsor Castle, the oldest and the largest inhabited castle in the world dating back to the 11th century. Originally built in the Norman period, the castle was the inspiration behind the formation of the Order of the Garter by King Edward III of England much like the glory of the court of the Round Table of King Arthur. The first tournament of the Order was held at Windsor Castle on Saint George's Day 1349. The castle also houses the grand medieval Saint George's Chapel which is the spiritual home of the Order of the Garter. The castle was neglected until the Glorious Restoration of the monarchy by King Charles II who returned the castle to its former splendour by sumptuously redecorating it. The castle was again neglected for many years until the reign of King George IV who completely reinvented it. He doubled the height of the Round Tower by adding 30 ft in height. His greatest monument was the Waterloo Chamber, decorated with portraits of the key players who helped defeat Napoleon. During World War I King George V changed the family name from the Germanic Saxe-Coburg and Gotha to the more English House of Windsor as a symbol of strength and sovereignty. The castle suffered damage during World War II, and also the fire of 20 November 1992. Many of the castle's state rooms were destroyed but were all later restored after a £37 million programme was launched.

== Episode three: Palace of Holyroodhouse ==
Bruce charts the history of the Palace from its early days as an Augustinian abbey. Around 1501 James IV decided to convert the buildings into a palace. His daughter Mary, Queen of Scots returned from France to the palace at the age of eighteen after the death of her husband, the King of France, who had died after three years of marriage. Her disastrous second marriage to Henry Stuart, Lord Darnley, the 1566 murder of her private secretary David Rizzio and the mysterious death of Darnley. The Palace also holds the last picture of Mary at the time of her execution. Later, the Civil War in England led to the neglect of the house until 1660 when Charles II of England was restored, and he updated the palace into a building never seen before in Scotland with classically themed French tapestries favoured at the time. He ordered a grand staircase and the Great Gallery, containing contemporary portraits of every Scottish monarch then known. In 1745 Bonnie Prince Charlie used the house as a campaign headquarters during his attempt to reclaim the throne for the Stuarts. George IV of the United Kingdom, born a German, was the first king to visit in over 150 years and, as his portrait in the palace testifies, the first one to wear tartan. The final stage covered is that of Queen Victoria, and the bequeathing in 1868 of an elaborate Flemish cabinet.

== Gallery ==
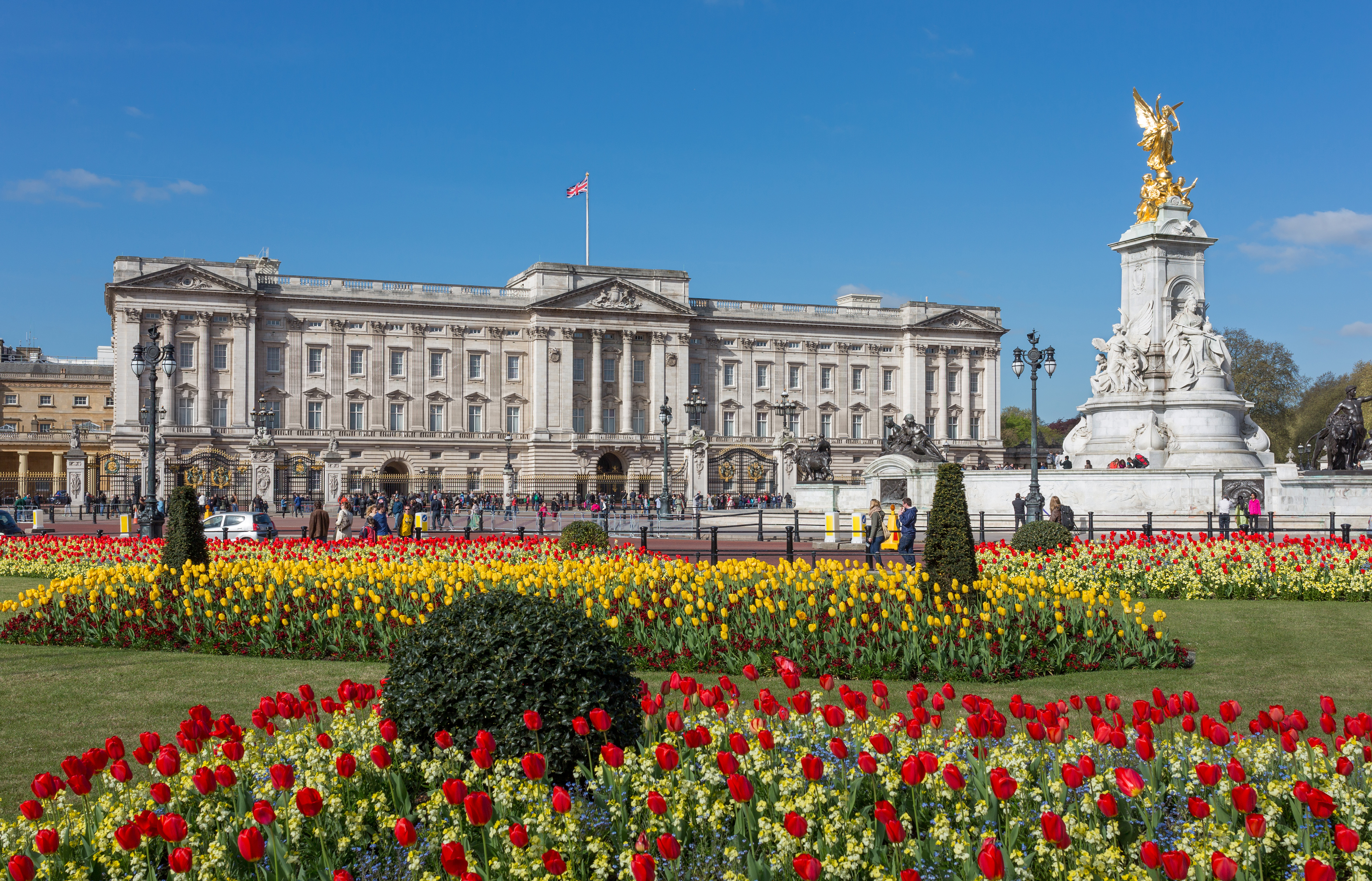
Buckingham Palace

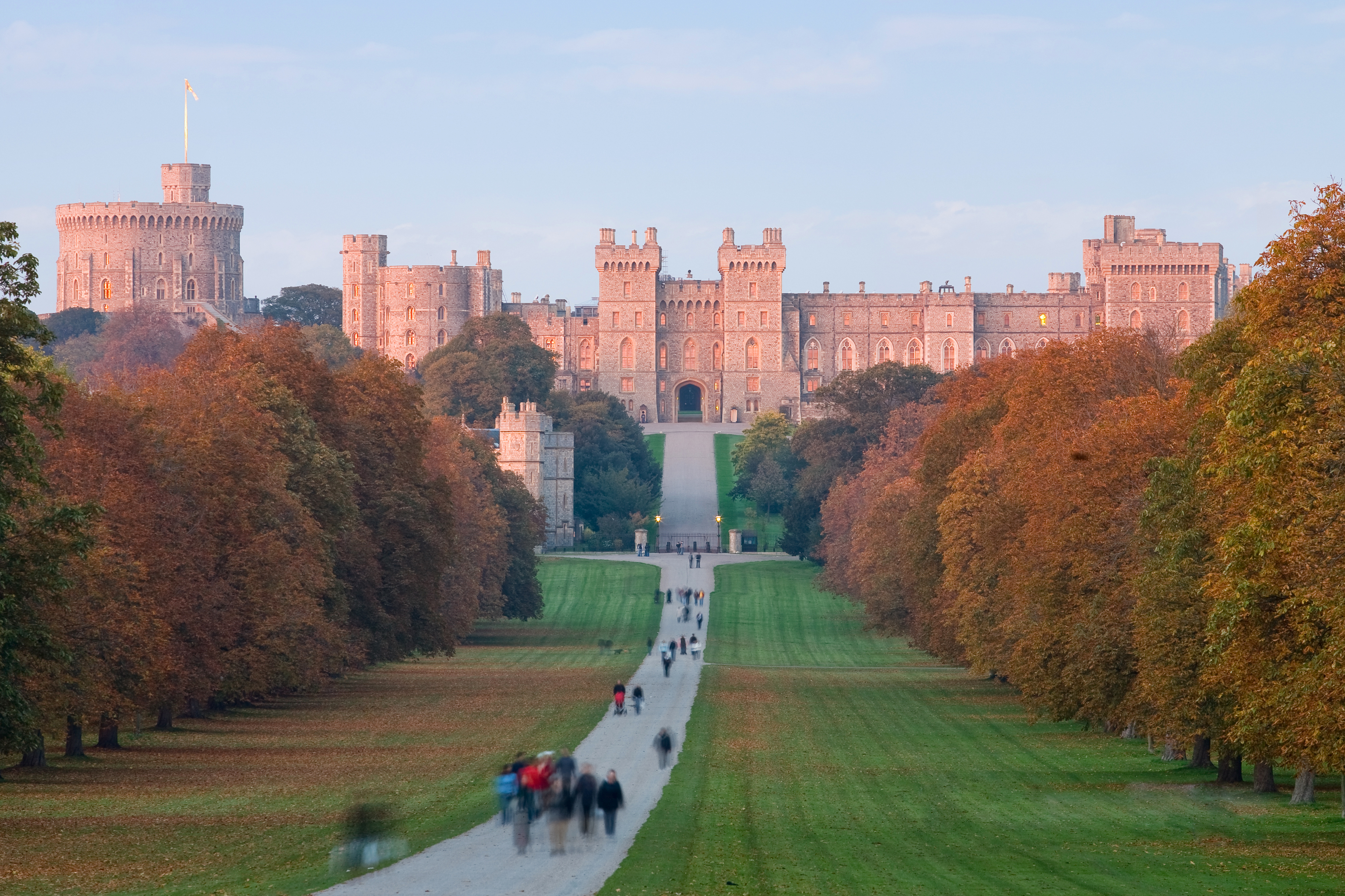
Windsor Castle

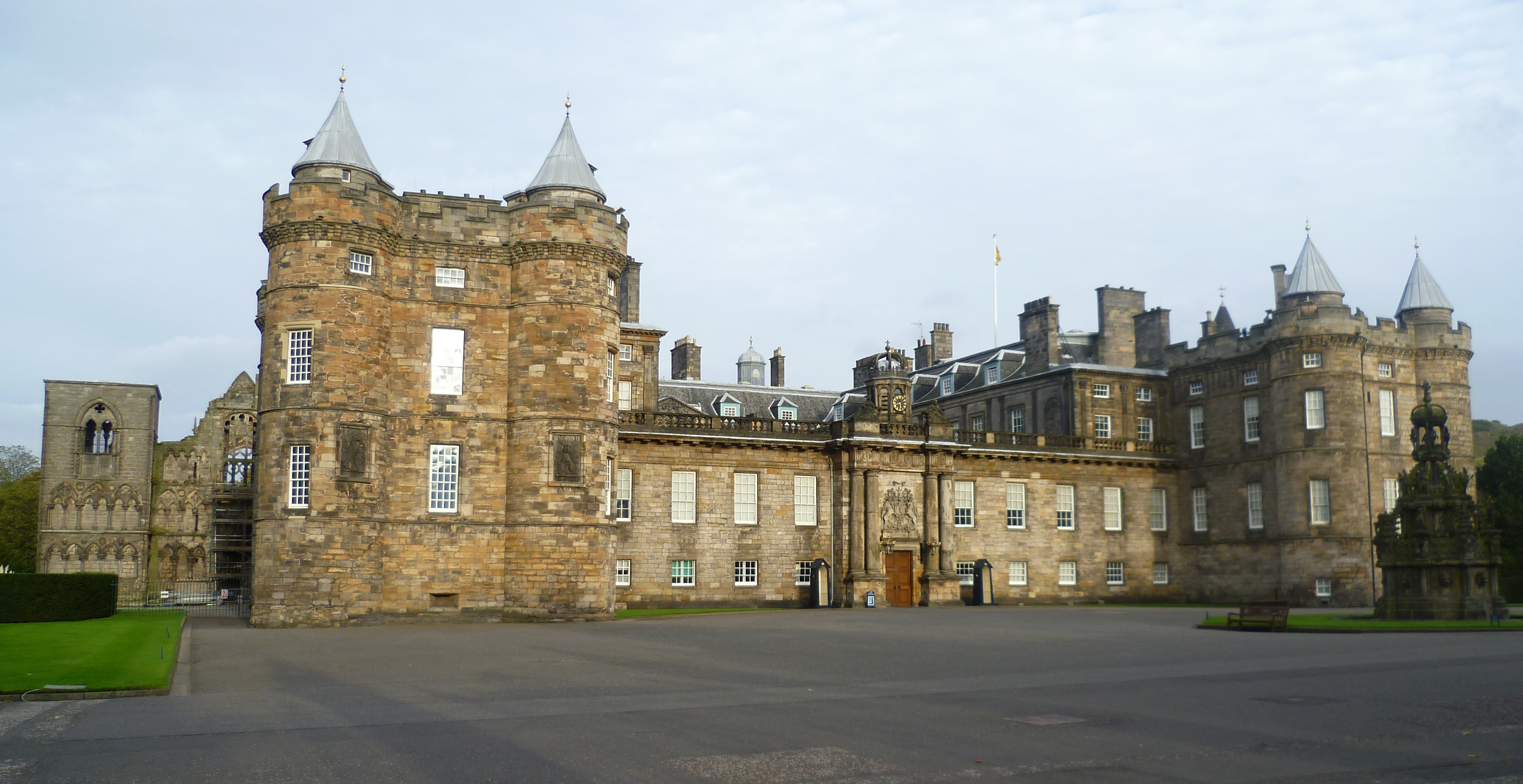
Holyroodhouse
