= Cristina Vergano =

Italian painter

- Born: 1960 (age 65–66); Milan, Italy
- Known for: Painting

Cristina Vergano (born 1960) is an Italian-born fine artist and designer living in New York City. Her classical, academic painting style offsets the highly imaginative content of her work. A playful, surreal vein runs through the artist's work, along with a subtle feminist concern and a wink to Pop art. Vergano's paintings have varied subject matter and can be populated with human-animal hybrid creatures, flying saucers, word games, and amused references to images by historical artists.

== Life ==
Born in Milan in 1960, Vergano painted and drew since early childhood, her father and grandfather were both fine artists. Cristina Vergano studied at the International School of Milan, Liceo Cassini in Sanremo, and Universita' di Genova.

Frequent and extensive visits to art museums and European travels created in the artist a lasting influence of classical balance and solid technique, while classical studies gave her work a conceptual basis. After obtaining a degree in Italian Letters and Art History, at the Università di Genova, the artist permanently moved to the United States in 1984.

Having lived in Florida and Georgia, Vergano moved to New York City in 1994. While continuing her professional career as a fine artist, represented by the Woodward Gallery, Vergano expanded her work to industrial design, creating a successful line of products for New York's Museum of Modern Art and the Liberty Science Center. In 2015, Vergano joined the Tourne' Gallery, which now represents her.

Cristina Vergano's work has been exhibited in numerous New York solo exhibitions, as well as at the Chicago Athenaeum, The Parrish Art Museum, De Cordova museum, The Laguna Art Museum, The Islip Art Museum, The University of Ohio, and The Anthropology Museum of the People of New York.

Her work has been featured in the New York Times, Art in America, Art News, Blouin ArtInfo, Juxtapoz Magazine, Elle Decor, Art and Auction, Art & Antiques, American Arts Quarterly, Esquire Japan, and many other publications. Her work appeared on the cover of George Singleton's book "The Half Mammals of Dixie", and appeared in Nora Robert's Novel "Black Rose".

Vergano lives and works in New York City and rural Pennsylvania. She is represented by the Tourné Gallery in New York City.
