= Real Story =

- Presented by: Fiona Bruce
- Country of origin: United Kingdom

Production
- Producer: Mike Lewis
- Editor: Dave Stanford

Original release
- Network: BBC One
- Release: March 10, 2003 – 2006

Real Story is a current affairs programme which aired on the British television channel BBC One at 19:30 GMT weekly on Mondays. It was hosted by Fiona Bruce who was also presenter of Crimewatch. The programme was edited by Dave Stanford and produced by Mike Lewis.

It focused on the weeks big stories such as health problems and political views. Fiona Bruce often met some of the victims of the main problem being discussed for use on the programme. The programme was considered a BBC version of ITV1's popular programme Tonight With Trevor McDonald which focuses on similar subjects.

When Real Story launched on 10 March 2003, the BBC's then head of Current Affairs, Peter Horrocks, called it "a valuable addition to our story telling capacity – popular current affairs, but with BBC values."

On 17 November 2006, the BBC announced that Real Story was to be axed, to make way for The One Show.
