= Welsh Women's Aid =

- Location: Wales
- Region served: Wales
- Services: Domestic abuse support
- Revenue: £3,302,565 (2023)
- Employees: 50

Welsh Women's Aid is the national charity in Wales in the area of domestic violence and other forms of violence against women. The charity was founded in 1978 as an offshoot of the original UK federation of Women's Aid, as an equivalent body to the Women's Aid Federation of England (which continued to be known simply as Women's Aid), Scottish Women's Aid in Scotland and the Women's Aid Federation [of] Northern Ireland. It coordinates, influences and campaigns for effective responses and supports a network of Women's Aid services across Wales, delivering support including refuge, counselling and outreach at a local level.

== History ==
Women's Aid Wales was formed in 1978, after several local Women's Aid groups across Wales joined together to create a national umbrella service. This was done to help coordinate work and campaigns across Wales. The first women's refuge in Wales opened in Cardiff in 1974, offering space for women fleeing domestic abuse. The Cardiff refuge joined Welsh Women's Aid upon its formation, bringing the first women's refuge under the Welsh Women's Aid umbrella.

== Research ==
Welsh Women's Aid regularly contribute to Welsh Government reports as well as releasing multiple publications throughout the year.
