= Women's Aid =

UK charity for victims of domestic violence

Women's Aid Federation of England
- Founded: 13 March 1996
- Type: Registered UK charity (number 1054154)
- Purpose: Domestic violence
- Location: Kings House, Orchard Street, Bristol, BS1 5EH UK
- Region served: National (England)
- Revenue: £3.5 million
- Employees: 44
- Website: womensaid.org.uk

Women's Aid Federation of England, commonly called Women's Aid within England, is one of a group of charities across the United Kingdom. There are four main Women's Aid Federations, 3 for each of the countries of the United Kingdom, and one for the Republic of Ireland (not being part of the UK). Its aim is to end domestic violence against women and children. The charity works at both local and national levels to ensure women's safety from domestic violence and promotes policies and practices to prevent domestic violence.

Women's Aid Federation of England is the sole national co-ordinating body for the England-wide network of over 370 local domestic violence organisations, providing over 500 refuges, outreach, advocacy and children's support services. Women's Aid campaigns for better legal protection and services and in partnership with its national network, runs public awareness and education campaigns. Any woman can stay at a refuge (and take their children) and proof of abuse is not needed to stay at a refuge.

Women's Aid provides services through its publications and website, and runs a Freephone 24-Hour National Domestic Violence Helpline in partnership with Refuge. Former Spice Girl Melanie Brown became a patron of the charity in 2018 after leaving what she described as an abusive relationship and was made an MBE in 2022 for services to charitable causes and vulnerable women.

== History ==
=== Origins ===
Women's Aid was set up as a national United Kingdom federation to co-ordinate almost 40 services that had been established over the country. It was originally known as the National Women's Aid Federation, before the launch of Scottish Women's Aid in 1976, and both Welsh Women's Aid and the Women's Aid Federation Northern Ireland in 1978. The first Women's Aid federation was set up in 1974, shortly after the founding of the first refuge for women experiencing domestic violence. The organisation provided practical and emotional support as part of a range of services to women and children experiencing violence. The charity was instrumental in lobbying for the 1976 Domestic Violence and Matrimonial Proceedings Act, and for having women and children at risk of domestic violence to count as homeless under the 1977 Housing Act.

During the 1980s, Women's Aid established the first ever National Domestic Violence Helpline service to meet the increasing number of calls to Women's Aid national office. The Helpline not only provided help and support for abused women and children, as well as agency professionals seeking advice, it also became a national referral point for access to the national network of refuge and support services. The charity continued to lobby for greater consideration and support for women and children experiencing domestic violence.

Through the 1990s, Women's Aid continued its lobbying work, as well as increasing its public campaigning. In 1994, the charity released the first ever domestic violence cinema advert, and supported the television soap opera Brookside in a long-running, high-profile storyline on a family affected by domestic violence. In 1999, Women's Aid launched the first comprehensive domestic violence website in the UK and The Gold Book, the first ever UK-wide public directory of local refuge and helpline services.

Since 2000, Women's Aid has run a number of high-profile campaigns, continued its work lobbying government, and launched a number of educational resources aimed at schools and teachers to encourage the teaching of healthy relationships as a preventative measure against domestic violence. Katie Ghose was the CEO of Women's Aid, having started in July 2017. She took over the post from Polly Neate, and stepped down in February 2019, after complaints from a number of women groups after her public praise of UKIP.

== Research ==
In 1978, Women's Aid carried out a study of 1,000 women living in refuges, in light of statistics demonstrating that 1 in 4 crimes in Scotland was 'wife assault.' This was the beginning of significant amounts of research performed by Women's Aid and a number of partners into issues around domestic violence, which has developed into the release of Women's Aid's 'Annual Survey of Members', which gives details of the services in England working to support women experiencing domestic violence, and the women who use them.

== Supporters ==
- Jenni Murray, broadcaster
- Will Young, performer
- Nicola Harwin CBE, Former Women's Aid Chief Executive
- Gordon Ramsay, three Michelin star chef
- Sarah Brown, wife of Gordon Brown, former UK Prime Minister
- Fiona Bruce, BBC newsreader
- Charlie Webster, TV presenter
- Keira Knightley, actress
- Jahméne Douglas, British soul/gospel singer, and the first youth ambassador of the UK charity Women's Aid, for children and young people
- Jess Phillips, British member of parliament and former employee
- Mel B, singer
- Toby-Alexander Smith, actor

== See also ==
- Scottish Women's Aid
- ManKind Initiative
- Cut (advertisement)
- What's it going to take?
