= List of acts of the Northern Ireland Assembly from 2015 =

This is a list of acts of the Northern Ireland Assembly passed in 2015. Acts of the Northern Ireland Assembly are enacted by the Northern Ireland Assembly, which has legislative authority over devolved matters in relation to Northern Ireland under the authority of the Northern Ireland Act 1998. Acts are cited by calendar year, in the same fashion as acts of Parliament of the United Kingdom. Each act passed in a respective year is given a chapter number (abbreviated "c.") denoted by Arabic numerals, and citations are usually followed by the suffix "(N.I.)" so as to prevent confusion with acts of Parliament of the United Kingdom.

10 acts of the Northern Ireland Assembly were passed in 2015.

indicates that an act has been transcribed on Wikisource, indicates that an act is available to view at legislation.gov.uk, and indicates the location of the original act in the Parliamentary Archives.

== Acts of the Northern Ireland Assembly ==
Short title	Citation	Royal assent
Long title
Work and Families Act (Northern Ireland) 2015	2015 c. 1 (N.I.)	8 January 2015
An Act to make provision about shared rights to leave from work and statutory pay in connection with caring for children; time off work to accompany to ante-natal appointments or to attend adoption appointments; to make provision about the right to request flexible working; and for connected purposes.
Human Trafficking and Exploitation (Criminal Justice and Support for Victims) Act (Northern Ireland) 2015	2015 c. 2 (N.I.)	13 January 2015
An Act to make provision about human trafficking, slavery and other forms of exploitation, including measures to prevent and combat such exploitation and to provide support for victims of such exploitation; and for connected purposes.
Off-street Parking (Functions of District Councils) Act (Northern Ireland) 2015	2015 c. 3 (N.I.)	12 March 2015
An Act to transfer to district councils certain functions in relation to off-street parking places; and for connected purposes.
Budget Act (Northern Ireland) 2015 (repealed)	2015 c. 4 (N.I.)	12 March 2015
An Act to authorise the issue out of the Consolidated Fund of certain sums for the service of the years ending 31st March 2015 and 2016; to appropriate those sums for specified purposes; to authorise the Department of Finance and Personnel to borrow on the credit of the appropriated sums; to authorise the use for the public service of certain resources for the years ending 31st March 2015 and 2016; and to revise the limits on the use of certain accruing resources in the year ending 31st March 2015. (Repealed by Northern Ireland Budget Act 2018 (c. 20 (N.I.)))
Pensions Act (Northern Ireland) 2015	2015 c. 5 (N.I.)	23 June 2015
An Act to make provision about pensions and about benefits payable to people in connection with bereavement; and for connected purposes.
Ombudsman and Commissioner for Complaints (Amendment) Act (Northern Ireland) 2015 (repealed)	2015 c. 6 (N.I.)	20 July 2015
An Act to extend the maximum period for which an acting Assembly Ombudsman for Northern Ireland and an acting Northern Ireland Commissioner for Complaints may hold office. (Repealed by Public Services Ombudsman Act (Northern Ireland) 2016 (c. 4 (N.I.)))
Budget (No. 2) Act (Northern Ireland) 2015 (repealed)	2015 c. 7 (N.I.)	24 July 2015
An Act to authorise the issue out of the Consolidated Fund of certain sums for the service of the year ending 31st March 2016; to appropriate those sums for specified purposes; to authorise the Department of Finance and Personnel to borrow on the credit of the appropriated sums; to authorise the use for the public service of certain resources (including accruing resources) for the year ending 31st March 2016; and to repeal certain spent provisions. (Repealed by Northern Ireland Budget Act 2018 (c. 20 (N.I.)))
Reservoirs Act (Northern Ireland) 2015	2015 c. 8 (N.I.)	24 July 2015
An Act to Make provision about the regulation of the management, construction and alteration of certain reservoirs, in particular in relation to their safety to collect and store water; and for connected purposes.
Justice Act (Northern Ireland) 2015	2015 c. 9 (N.I.)	24 July 2015
An Act to provide for a single jurisdiction for county courts and magistrates' courts; to amend the law on committal for trial; to provide for prosecutorial fines; to make provision in relation to victims and witnesses in criminal proceedings and investigations; to amend the law on criminal records and live links; to provide for violent offences prevention orders; to make other amendments relating to the administration of civil and criminal justice; and for connected purposes.
Children's Services Co-operation Act (Northern Ireland) 2015	2015 c. 10 (N.I.)	9 December 2015
An Act to require co-operation among certain public authorities and other persons in order to contribute to the well-being of children and young persons; to require the adoption of a children and young persons strategy; and for connected purposes.
