= International School of Milan =

School in Milan, Italy

The International School of Milan (ISM) is an international school and IB World School in Baranzate, just north-west of Milan, Italy. Founded in 1958, it was the first IB World School in Milan and one of the first in Italy to offer the full International Baccalaureate continuum (the Primary Years, Middle Years and Diploma Programmes) to students aged 2 to 18.

In 2016, the school became part of the Inspired Education Group, which acquired the International School of Europe group that same year, together with Milan’s St. Louis School. ISM is one of the largest and longest-established schools in Inspired’s Italian network, which also includes international schools in Monza, Modena, Como and Bergamo.

== History ==
Founded in 1958, the school initially offered the British O Levels/GCSE and A Levels. The International Baccalaureate was gradually adopted as the main curriculum after the Italian government recognized the IB as equivalent to the Maturità (the Italian equivalent of A Levels) during the late 1980s to early 1990s. The International School of Milan no longer teaches the British curriculum and now offers only the International Baccalaureate programmes.

In September 2013, the school opened a brand-new purpose-built campus in Baranzate, northwest of Milan which united the Primary, Middle and High School sections of the school.

== International School of Europe ==
International School of Europe S.p.A. (ISE) is a group of international schools founded by the Formiga family. ISE was acquired by the private equity firm H.I.G. Capital in 2014 and sold to the Inspired Education Group in 2016. Today it manages Inspired’s international schools in Italy, all of which follow the International Baccalaureate programmes.

== Notable alumni ==
- Fiona Bruce, British journalist, newsreader and television presenter
