= Digital Cinema Media =

Cinema advertising company

Digital Cinema Media Ltd.
- Formerly: Rank Screen Advertising (1969–1992); RSA Advertising (1992–1995); Cinema Media (1995–1996); Carlton Screen Advertising (1996–2008)
- Type: Joint venture
- Industry: Cinema advertising
- Founded: 1969 (as Rank Screen Advertising); 11 July 2008 (current incarnation)
- Headquarters: 350 Euston Road, London, United Kingdom
- Key people: Karen Stacey (Managing Director)
- Owner: Regal Global Entertainment (50%); Odeon Cinemas Ltd (50%)
- Website: www.dcm.co.uk

Digital Cinema Media (DCM) is an advertising company, supplying cinema advertisements to Cineworld, Odeon, and Vue cinema chains, as well as some independent cinema chains. The company was formed in 11 July 2008 and is a joint venture between Cineworld and Odeon.

== Formation ==
Before its formation, Digital Cinema Media was known as Rank Screen Advertising, a firm owned by The Rank Organisation. It was then renamed to RSA Advertising in Fall 1992, and again to Cinema Media in September 1995, although the RSA name remains as an in-name unit.

Following Carlton's purchase of RSA from The Rank Group, Carlton Screen Advertising was formed in 1996, with the identity launched in 1997. The new company supplied cinema advertising for Odeon and Cineworld, as well as ABC and UCI Cinemas, before their respective takeovers by Odeon. In 1999, cinema operator UGC joined the business following its buyout of Virgin Cinemas. However, its UK business was taken over by Cineworld in 2004.

On 11 July 2008, CSA was sold from ITV plc to Cineworld Group and Odeon Cinemas as a 50:50 joint venture, and was rebranded as Digital Cinema Media, thus marking the return of the "Cinema Media" name for the first time since 1995.

Carlton Screen Advertising's operations in Ireland were spun off, and in 2014, would become Wide Eye Media (which is, as of 2022, the Irish branch of Pearl & Dean). It supplied idents for the UK sites of Cineworld and Odeon; the new look and identity first came into force on October 1, 2008.

A deal signed in 2010 saw all Vue Cinemas sites included in the business from 1 January 2011; this has resulted in the company supplying advertisements for nearly 90% of UK cinemas. In April 2011, DCM changed their on-screen identity for the second time. In September 2012, DCM became the first UK cinema advertising company to 'go digital', though some older cinema sites, mostly those operated by Vue, continue to use standard film.

On 25 January 2013, DCM changed its idents and company logo, and also introduced a brand new strapline - 'Dynamic Advertising'. The old idents were still in use until early March 2013. In January 2014, DCM hosted a College Project in which students had to design a new ident for DCM. In December 2016, DCM was awarded a contract with Everyman Cinemas, becoming the chain's commercial partner.

On 7 September 2022, Cineworld, which owned 50 percent of the company, filed for Chapter 11 bankruptcy in the United States. However, the bankruptcy had no affiliation with Digital Cinema Media, and the company is continuing to operate as normal.

In 2025, DCM was awarded a contract with the UK-based cinemas of the Irish chain Omniplex Cinemas, replacing their previous partner Pearl & Dean. However, Omniplex's Irish sites remain with the Irish branch of Pearl & Dean.

== Digital advertising ==
Beginning in 2009, when 3D films began to take a dominating force in the film market, DCM introduced reels produced in 'digital film', which were only used to precede films in 3D at the time. This eliminated such implications as 'cue dots' and graining that had become familiar on standard film. The 'fade to black' function after each advert was also removed, and thus the reel started the next advert immediately after the previous. Upon the original change of image in April 2011, all reels were produced in digital format for all films at cinemas that were capable of showing them. DCM phased out standard film completely by September 2012, and is currently in the process of converting every cinema site that it supplies advertising, to digital.

Following the current trend of the latest films becoming available in digital 3D, DCM announced plans to go down that route with advertising. In December 2009, Avatar was the first film in Britain to be coupled with a 3D advertising reel.

== Controversy ==
In 2015, DCM created controversy when they did not permit the display of a Church of England advert featuring the Lord's Prayer, due to their policies prohibiting religious advertising. The government's equalities watchdog also voiced alarm, suggesting it undermined "essential British values". However, the BBFC had no problem with it and passed it with a U rating.

== Identification history ==
DCM has used three different idents. Usually, a 10-second version of the ident is seen as the first clip seen at the start of the cinema reel. A 15-second version is later seen before the trailers begin, around 10 minutes into the cinema reel.

Former logo from 11 July 2008 to March 2013.

The first ones, which debuted in UK cinemas on 1 October 2008, were made by CDT Design, showing a montage of film clips and images with a cinemagoer, accompanied by electronic music done by Red Custard Music. These idents were in use until 3 April 2011, when they were replaced again.

By April 2011, the previous idents were replaced with the 'lantern' version of the DCM logo and a remixed version of the music, produced by Jump Design. These idents were used until March 2013.

Former logo from 23 January 2013 to 27 May 2025. It was still used on regular idents and on the website until 9 September 2026.

In 2013, the "Dynamic Advertising" idents by Fearlessly Frank were introduced. The tagline was short-lived, however, and was changed to "Welcome to Our World" in October 2013. These idents were uploaded to YouTube on January 23, 2013, and were officially adopted two days later, though some cinemas did not adopt them until a few months later. "Laughter" and "Suspense" were temporarily dropped in January 2014, leaving only the "Amazement" ident, and then partially returned to some cinemas in December that year. However, they did not return to all cinemas until 2017, with the music on the "Amazement" ident being changed to a different one later that year (with some cinemas retaining the original pre-2017 music).

Originally, at the end of the idents, the company's then-slogan, "Dynamic advertising", was seen at the end, and since 2014, the current slogan "Welcome to Our World" has been used. Generally, "Amazement" is mostly used, with "Laughter" being used before an animated or comedy film and "Suspense" before a horror or action movie.

== See also ==
- Pearl & Dean Ireland
- Cineworld
- Odeon Cinemas
- Vue Cinemas
