= Pearl & Dean =

British cinema advertising company

Pearl & Dean Cinemas Ltd.
- Type: Private
- Industry: Media advertising
- Founded: 1953; 73 years ago
- Founder: Ernie Pearl; Charles Pearl; Bob Dean
- Headquarters: London, England, UK
- Products: Cinema advertising
- Parent: Willowbrook Investments Ltd
- Subsidiaries: Radiovision Broadcast International (RBI); British Lion Films; Mediavision
- Website: www.pearlanddean.com

Pearl & Dean is a British cinema advertising company, founded in 1953.

Pearl & Dean is now owned by Willowbrook Investments Ltd, and controls advertising at many UK cinema sites including multiplex operators Everyman, Curzon, and Showcase; the company also represents approximately half of the UK's independent cinemas.

== History ==
Pearl & Dean was formed in 1953 by Ernie and Charles Pearl and Bob Dean, to sell advertising on British cinema screens prior to the showing of the main feature. The short adverts, with which British cinema audiences quickly became familiar, were the idea of Joe Morris (born Joseph Iglitsky), one of Pearl & Dean's in-house advertising executives. The initial staffing of Pearl & Dean was by employees of Theatre Publicity and Langfords (The Rank Organisation) who followed the directors when they left to form the company upon obtaining the advertising rights in ABC Cinemas, the first time that group had accepted advertising in their cinemas.

In 1966, Pearl & Dean formed a subsidiary company called Radiovision Broadcast International (RBI) to represent the marketing interests of the American Broadcasting Company radio and television stations in Europe. During the same year, the company signed an exclusive contract to represent the sale of advertising time on the offshore pirate radio stations Swinging Radio England and Britain Radio. This contract with the offshore stations became mired in controversy due to a lack of sales and led to the headline-making bankruptcy of the original London management company for the two offshore radio stations that had been created by a private investment group formed by Don Pierson of Eastland, Texas, USA.

Pearl & Dean was acquired by British Lion Films in 1969, following a successful decade for the company, having 52% of the market share in cinema advertising, competing with Presbury, Faber Advertising Services and Rank Organisation. A few years later, the company was acquired by Mills & Allen. Around the same time, Rank acquired Presbury and Faber. Under Mills & Allen's ownership, their share depleted to 12%, an all-time low for the company.

For many years Pearl & Dean held the contract for ABC Cinemas, until ABC was bought by Cannon in 1986.

In 1993, Pearl & Dean was acquired by Mediavision, a French cinema advertising contractor, and their fortunes started to improve. In 1999 the company was bought out by Scottish Media Group (now STV Group) for £22 million.

In 2015, the company changed hands again with Image Ltd disposing of its holding to Willowbrook Investments Ltd. As part of the change of ownership, Irish media entrepreneur Dermot Hanrahan became the Chairman of Pearl and Dean. Hanrahan is also Chairman of Wide Eye Media in the Republic of Ireland which operates a similar business to Pearl and Dean. Both companies are now owned by the same group.

Pearl & Dean supplied advertisements for Warner Cinemas throughout the 1990s and 2000s. Warner was later renamed Warner Village Cinemas and then Vue Cinemas. In January 2011, Vue's advertising contract was taken over by Digital Cinema Media.

Pearl & Dean also supplied advertisements for MGM Cinemas and its successor Virgin Cinemas during the 1990s. After Virgin were purchased by UGC in 1999, they switched their contract to Carlton Screen Advertising, who were then the forerunner to Digital Cinema Media.

Pearl & Dean currently supplies advertising for the UK cinema chains Showcase, Curzon, Everyman, many independent cinemas in the UK and pop-up cinema events.

=== Theme tune ===
Pearl & Dean is known for its distinctive theme tune entitled "Asteroid", composed in 1968 by Pete Moore, which can be heard on the Pearl & Dean website. The introduction of the new titles accompanied by the "Asteroid" theme saw the disappearance of the Grecian pillars, with its music "Grand Vista" composed by Trevor Duncan.

The theme was sampled by Goldbug in their 1996 cover version of "Whole Lotta Love", which peaked at number 3 in the UK Singles Chart.

== See also ==
- Pearl & Dean Ireland
