= Too Tough to Die (disambiguation) =

Too Tough to Die is the 1984 album by American punk rock band Ramones

Too Tough to Die may also refer to:

- "Too Tough to Die", a song by heavy metal band Black Label Society from their 2005 album Mafia.
- "Too Tough to Die", a song by Martina Topley-Bird from her 2003 album Quixotic
- "Too Tough to Die", an episode from season 1 of CSI: Crime Scene Investigation.
- "Too Tough to Die", a slogan for Lucky Brand Jeans
- Too Tough to Die (The McRackins album), a Ramones cover album
