= Maxinquaye =

1995 debut album by Tricky

Studio album by Tricky
- Released: 20 February 1995
- Recorded: 1994
- Studio: Tricky's home; Loveshack; Eastcote (London)
- Genre: Trip hop; experimental; dub; electronic; R&B; post-rock; British hip hop
- Length: 57:13
- Label: 4th & B'way
- Producer: Tricky; Mark Saunders; Howie B; Kevin Petrie

Tricky chronology
Maxinquaye (1995)	Nearly God (1996)

Singles from Maxinquaye
- 1. "Aftermath" Released: January 1994; 2. "Ponderosa" Released: April 1994; 3. "Overcome" Released: January 1995; 4. "Black Steel" Released: March 1995; 5. "Hell Is Round the Corner" Released: July 1995; 6. "Pumpkin" Released: November 1995

Maxinquaye is the debut studio album by English rapper and producer Tricky, released on 20 February 1995 by 4th & B'way Records, a subsidiary of Island Records. In the years leading up to the album, Tricky had grown frustrated with his limited role in the musical group Massive Attack and wanted to pursue an independent project. Shortly after, he met with vocalist Martina Topley-Bird, who he felt would offer a wider vision to his music, and signed a solo contract with 4th & B'way in 1993. Tricky recorded Maxinquaye the following year primarily at his home studio in London, with Topley-Bird serving as the album's main vocalist, while Alison Goldfrapp, Ragga and Mark Stewart performed additional vocals.

With assistance from fellow producer Mark Saunders, Tricky used dub music techniques and heavily altered samples taken from a variety of sources to produce Maxinquaye. Its resulting groove-oriented downbeat, hazy and fragmented sound incorporates elements from hip hop, soul, rock, ambient techno, reggae and experimental music. Tricky's lyrics throughout the album explore themes of cultural decline, dysfunctional sexual relationships, fear of intimacy and recreational drug use, as he drew on his experiences in British drug culture and the influence of his late mother Maxine Quaye, after whom the album is titled.

Maxinquaye reached the number three position on the United Kingdom's albums chart and sold over 100,000 copies in its first few months of release. 4th & B'way marketed the album by relying on independent record promoters and Tricky's appearances in media, including publicity photographs and music videos that portrayed him and Topley-Bird in gender-bending fashion. Maxinquaye was cited by many journalists as the year's best record and the key release of the burgeoning trip hop genre. Since then, it has sold more than 500,000 copies worldwide and ranks frequently on lists of the greatest albums, while regarded as a significant influence on electronica, underground hip hop and British hip hop.

== Background ==
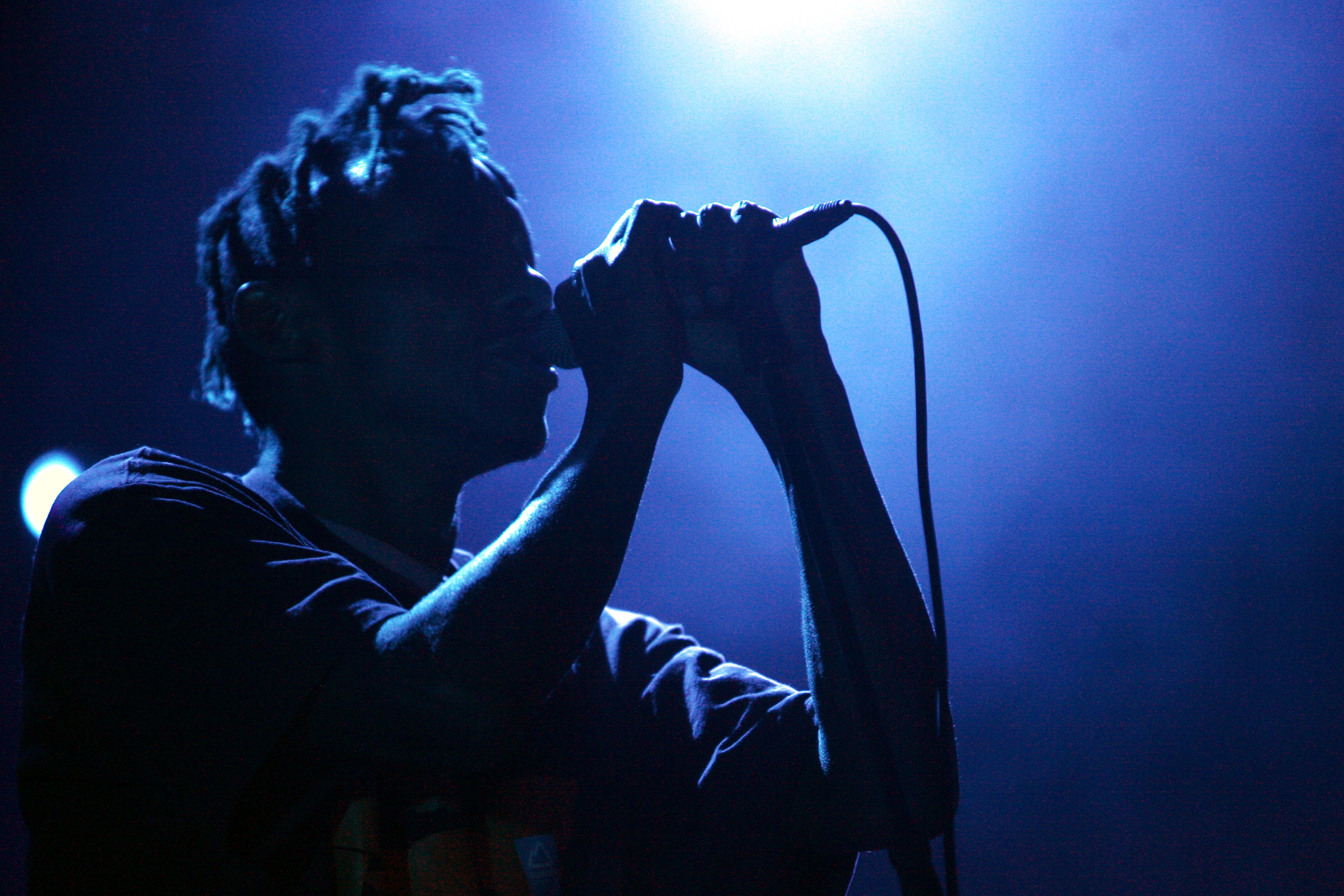
Tricky, photographed in 2008

Following a troubled upbringing in the Knowle West neighbourhood of Bristol, Tricky joined the multimedia collective The Wild Bunch during the late 1980s. As part of the collective, he helped arrange sound systems around Bristol's club scene, and performed under a stage name derived from "Tricky Kid", the nickname given to him in a street gang as a youth. The Wild Bunch signed a record deal with 4th & B'way Records and released two singles, but their slow, experimental sound failed to make a commercial impact. The collective dissolved in 1989, which led to a few of its members forming the group Massive Attack. Tricky became a frequent collaborator who rapped over their productions, but quit after finding his role in the group to be limited; he later reworked material he had written for Massive Attack on Maxinquaye.

In 1993, Tricky met with Martina Topley-Bird, then a teenager at Clifton College, after he saw her sitting against a wall near his house singing to herself. "That's really how it happened", she recalled. "A few weeks later, I went around to his house with some friends. We'd been drinking cider after our GCSEs. We were banging on his door, but he wasn't in. Then Mark Stewart, who lived there, came up to us and said: 'Yeah, this is Tricky's house, jump in through the window.'" Tricky's lyricism had matured from raps about street violence and sex to more personal and introspective writing, but Topley-Bird described his material for Maxinquaye as "quite depressing", which he believed was because of her more privileged background: "It's just reality. She's been a student all her life, grew up in Somerset, and I don't think she's ever faced the real world. She finds it all a bit weird. But she's my best mate."

They formed a musical and romantic partnership over subsequent years, and they produced "Aftermath", which subsequently appears on Maxinquaye. After offering the song to Massive Attack, who were not interested in including it on their 1991 album Blue Lines, Tricky released "Aftermath" independently to local record stores in September 1993 before he signed a record deal with 4th & B'way.

== Recording and production ==
Tricky asked Mark Saunders to co-produce Maxinquaye after being impressed by his previous work with the rock band The Cure on their albums Mixed Up (1990) and Wish (1992). They recorded Maxinquaye in the first half of 1994 at Tricky's home studio in Kilburn; further recording later took place at the Loveshack and Eastcote studios in Notting Hill. Island Records, 4th & B'Way's parent label, set up equipment in the home studio at Tricky's request, including an Akai S1000 sampler, an Atari 1040 computer with Logic software, an Alesis ADAT recorder, an AKG C3000 microphone, a Behringer Composer compressor and a Mackie 1604 mixing desk.

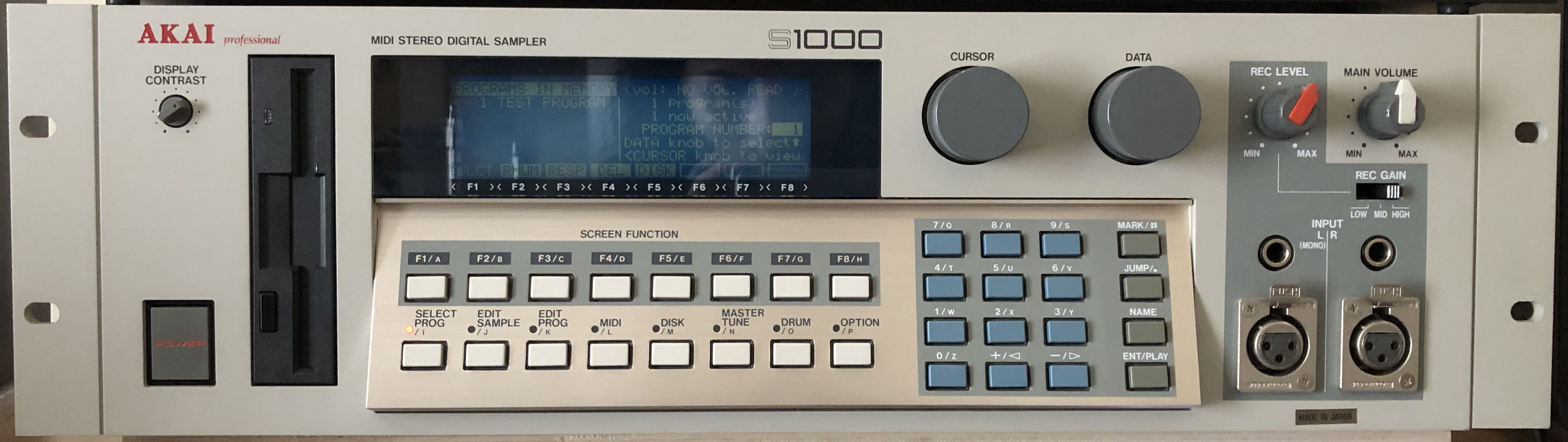
An Akai S1000 sampler, among the equipment used for the album

The recording sessions were somewhat chaotic, and Saunders, who had the impression he would only perform engineering duties, often found himself serving as a DJ and programmer. Tricky instructed him on what to sample, regardless of different tempos and pitches, and asked him to piece the results together, something Saunders achieved by pitch-shifting the respective samples until the combination sounded satisfactory. The samples they experimented with were taken from the many vinyl records that Saunders recalled were "littered" all over Tricky's floor. Influenced by dub music's production techniques, Tricky exhaustively altered borrowed sounds on his sampler, mixed tracks as they were being recorded live in the studio, and preserved sounds that otherwise would have been unwanted in the final mix, including glitches and crackles.For example, the central drum loop of "Ponderosa" was sampled from the soundtrack of the 1993 Indian film Khalnayak, composed by Laxmikant–Pyarelal.

Tricky had no concept of pitch and no regard for notational conventions or time signatures, nor any previous experience with sampling. Consequently, his approach to Maxinquaye challenged Saunders to rethink his ideas about music production and experiment in ways he had never tried before. Saunders was asked to combine samples of two songs that were 30 beats per minute apart and composed in entirely different keys. "[Tricky] thought differently to anybody I've ever known", he recalled. "It didn't occur to me that by de-tuning one to slow it down, both might then gel musically at that point. I always think of it like going into a scrapyard and building a car out of all the bits you can find. You could probably build a car that would work, and although it might be the ugliest you've ever seen, it would have loads of character."

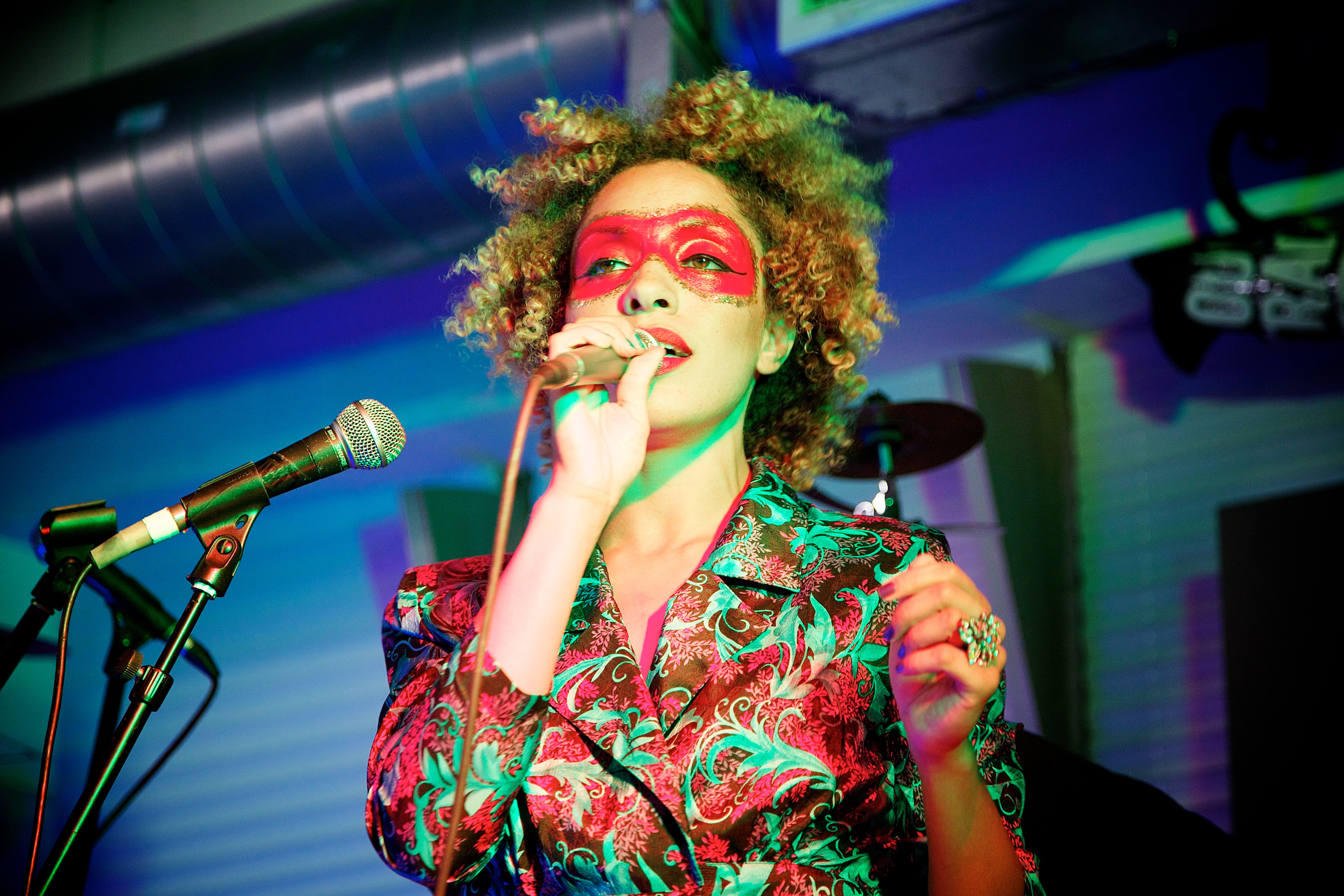
Martina Topley-Bird (2010)

According to the American critic Robert Christgau, Maxinquaye's groove-oriented and low-tempo music drew not only on dub but also on lo-fi, ambient techno and hip hop, while James Hunter from Rolling Stone said Tricky subsumed American hip hop, soul, reggae and 1980s English rock sounds into "a mercurial style of dance music". Entertainment Weekly's resident critic David Browne classified the music as an intellectual form of R&B. Ben Walsh of The Independent called it an experimental album featuring a "heady blend" of soul, rock, punk, hip hop, dub and electronica. In Tricky's own words, he composed his songs based on a particular sound he liked rather than having a definite song structure in mind: "I couldn't write you a blues track or a hip-hop track if you asked. I just make what I hear and then me and Martina sing all the words on paper, putting the emphasis on the things that perhaps shouldn't be sung."

Almost all of Topley-Bird's vocals on Maxinquaye were recorded in a single take, a process she later said was "totally instinctive. There was no time to drum up an alter ego." Topley-Bird, a soft-spoken singer, found herself backed on most tracks by Tricky's rapped vocals. According to the journalist Sean O'Hagan, she sang with a "broken voice" that acted as "the perfect foil to Tricky's whispered and drawled raps". The liner notes credited Tricky and Topley-Bird for vocals on all songs except "Pumpkin" and "You Don't", which Tricky performed with Alison Goldfrapp and Ragga, respectively. A printing error mistakenly credited the then-unknown Topley-Bird as "Martine" on the record. Other musicians were recruited to play instruments for some tracks, including James Stevenson on guitar and Pete Briquette on bass. The band FTV performed on "Black Steel", which was a rock version of Public Enemy's "Black Steel in the Hour of Chaos" (1988) and one of two remakes on Maxinquaye; Tricky also remade one of his contributions for Massive Attack, "Karmacoma" (1994), retitling it as "Overcome". Saunders contributed guitar himself, with the resulting improvisations treated as samples.

== Themes ==
Much of the thematic content on Maxinquaye is informed by Tricky's late mother. He explained the title's connection to his mother in an interview with Simon Reynolds, saying that "Quaye, that's this race of people in Africa, and 'Maxin,' that's my mum's name, Maxine, and I've just taken the E off"; Reynolds interpreted this as a "place name" similar to the Rastafarian idea of Zion. In another source, Tricky was reported as saying Quaye had also been his mother's surname. According to Greg Kot, his mother's name provided the album its title while her suicide, along with his father abandoning him and Tricky's lack of moral sense as a youth, helped inform his "unsentimental grasp on reality", which was reflected in Maxinquaye's "collision of beauty and violence". In the opinion of Stylus Magazine's Kenan Hebert, who called it "a document of obsession, mistrust, misconduct, solipsism and sociopathy", the songs dealing with dysfunctional sexual relationships and fear of intimacy were given a Freudian angle by his mother's influence on the album, including Tricky's reference to her on "Aftermath". In an interview for The Wire, Tricky explained his mother's influence and his use of female vocalists like Topley-Bird:

My first lyric ever on a song was "your eyes resemble mine, you'll see as no others can". I didn't have any kids then ... so what am I talking about? Who am I talking about? My mother ... used to write poetry but in her time she couldn't have done anything with that, there wasn't any opportunity. It's almost like she killed herself to give me the opportunity, my lyrics. I can never understand why I write as a female, I think I've got my mum's talent, I'm her vehicle. So I need a woman to sing that.

It's this primal wound [his mother's death] that makes him an aerial tuned to the frequencies of anguish and dead emanating from the [drug] culture. Hollowlands, stranded limbos, aftermath zones, desert shores: Tricky's songs are the mindscapes of a generation that has lost the capacity to dream of "a better place." His music's nowhere vastness externalizes the inner void left when the utopian imagination withers and dies. And yet Maxinquaye's last song, the unspeakably beautiful "Feed Me," seems to hold out a cruel glimmer of hope – a dream of the promised land, or lost motherland (Maxinquaye itself?), a place "where we're taught to grow strong/Strongly sensitive." The song is tentative, almost taunting – like a mirage. "Unreal, yeah," Tricky mutters.

— Simon Reynolds (2013)

While songs such as "Overcome" and "Suffocated Love" deal with themes of "sexual paranoia and male dread of intimacy", the rest of Maxinquaye explores the psychological tolls of British recreational drug culture, which Reynolds said once served as a "temporary utopia" for a generation of drug users who otherwise lacked a "constructive outlet for its idealism". He also felt that the album's cover art, featuring rusting metal surfaces, represented the cultural decline explored in the music's themes. Tricky drew on eschatological Rastafarian ideas of end times for the record, although unlike adherents to that movement, he did not disassociate himself from "Babylon" or the decadence of Western society; with lyrics such as "my brain thinks bomb-like/beware of our appetite" on "Hell Is Round the Corner", he said to Reynolds that "I'm part of this fuckin' psychic pollution ... It's like, I can be as greedy as you. The conditioned part of me says 'yeah, I'm gonna go out and make money, I'm going to rule my own little kingdom.'" Christgau deemed the album's songs "audioramas of someone who's signed on to work for the wages of sin and lived to cash the check", while O'Hagan said Tricky's "impressionistic prose poems" were written from the deviant perspective of the urban hedonist: "Maxinquaye is the sound of blunted Britain, paranoid and obsessive ... This was the inner-city blues, Bristol style".

The songs "Ponderosa", "Strugglin'" and "Hell Is Round the Corner" were inspired by Tricky's experiences with marijuana, alcohol, cocaine and ecstasy, particularly a two-year binge and consequent state of despondency while on Massive Attack's payroll after the completion of Blue Lines. His stream-of-consciousness lyrics on Maxinquaye explore the delirious, despondent and emotionally unstable state associated with drug use while offering a pessimistic view of the drug culture, as Tricky viewed the high of cocaine as undeserved and the depth of thought achieved through ecstasy as unsubstantial. In Reynolds' opinion, Tricky's experiences with drug-induced paranoia, anxiety and visions of spectres and demons were represented in the production of songs such as "Aftermath", "Hell Is Round the Corner" and "Strugglin'". On the latter track, he sampled sounds of creaking doors, the click of a gun being loaded, distant sirens and vinyl crackles, with Tricky's lyrics making explicit reference to visions of "mystical shadows, fraught with no meaning". For "Hell Is Round the Corner", he altered and slowed down a vibrato vocal sample, creating a disorienting effect resembling a basso profondo singer, over a loop of an orchestral Isaac Hayes recording, "Ike's Rap II".

== Marketing and sales ==
After Tricky signed to 4th & B'way, the label reissued "Aftermath" in January 1994 and released "Ponderosa" in April to promote Maxinquaye. The following year, three more singles were released—"Overcome" in January, "Black Steel" in March and "Pumpkin" in November. The label also released a four-track EP entitled The Hell E.P. in July, which was a collaboration with the American rap group Gravediggaz and featured "Hell Is Round the Corner"; the song reached number 12 on the British singles chart.

4th & B'way relied on independent record promoters and Tricky's cover story in NME to promote Maxinquaye, even though hip hop records in the United Kingdom generally received exposure through dance music dealers and press. According to 4th & B'way's director Julian Palmer, the UK's demographic of young music buyers such as students was more progressive than in the United States, where he said the record would have to be marketed differently because of his race. He believed that much like Portishead, a contemporary Bristol act, Tricky would have received airplay in the US on alternative or college rock radio if the label focused their efforts to promote him there: "Some people I've met were confused because he's black, and it's not easy to break through those barriers there." According to Rupert Howe from Q, the album's music tested stylistic barriers and "sounded as alien to hip hop" as it did to the Britpop sound popular in the UK at the time.

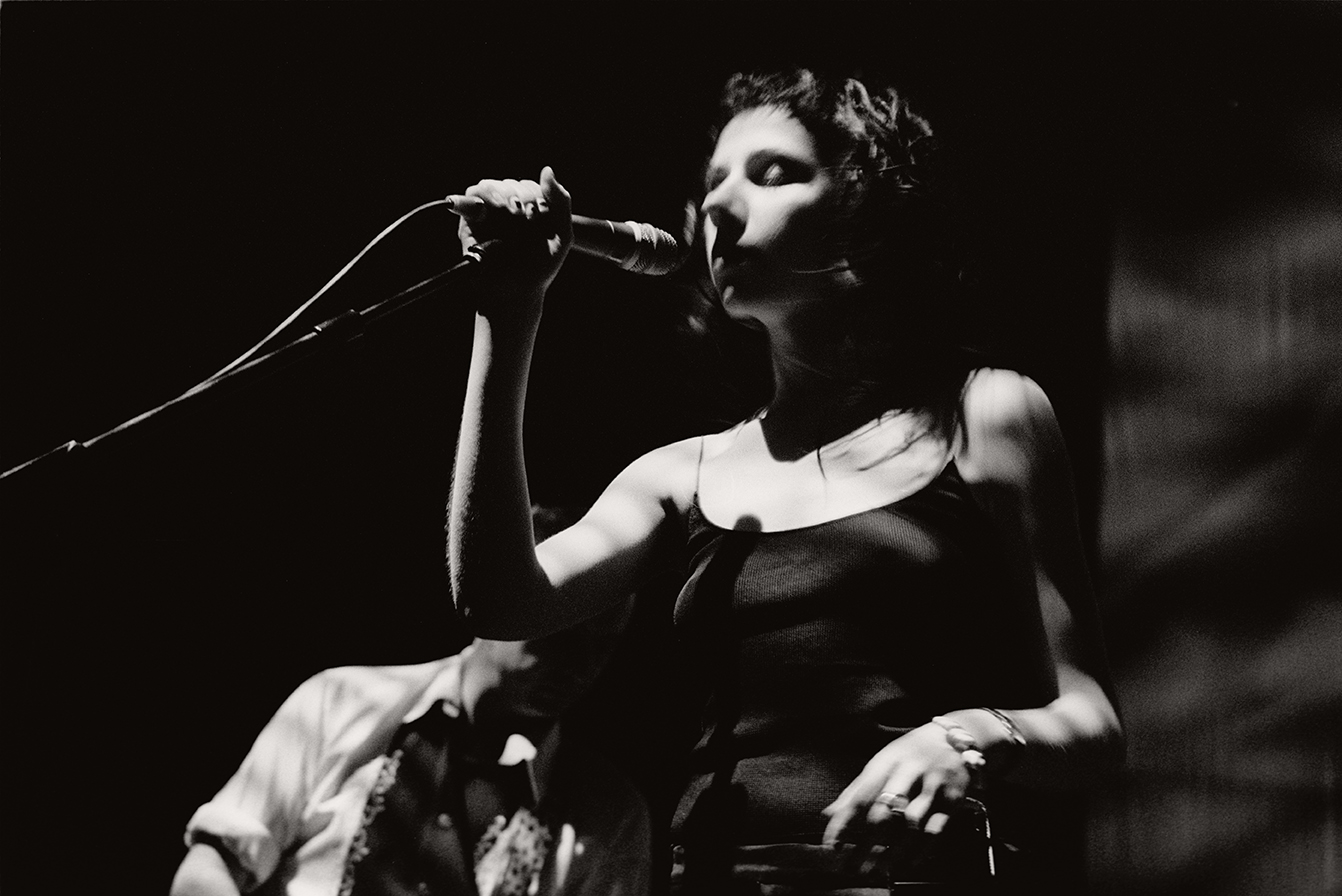
Tricky toured the United States as a supporting act for PJ Harvey (1998).

Publicity photos and music videos promoting Maxinquaye featured Tricky and Topley-Bird utilising androgynous imagery. They were photographed on one occasion wearing gender-bending clothing such as a mufti. Other promotional shots based on a wedding concept captured Topley-Bird dressed as the groom. As The Independent's Phil Johnson recalled, the very thin Tricky was dressed in drag as the bride and his sickly looking face "painted and preened", with smeared lipstick and a false eyelash in the style of Alex from the 1971 film A Clockwork Orange. In Johnson's opinion, the record's gender-bending promotional efforts were canny in how they "maximized Maxinquaye's cross-genre potential". According to Reynolds and Joy Press, while "most post-rock 'n' roll forms of popular music ideologically rest on rebellions against the feminine", Tricky "utilized the feminine to construct his rebellion against the strict categories of black identity and music". The musician later explained that he simply believed feminine men were much more interesting than masculine men.

Maxinquaye was released on 20 February 1995 and sold over 100,000 copies in its first few months in the UK, despite no significant radio airplay. The record charted for 35 weeks on the British albums chart, peaking at number three. After it was released in the US on 18 April, Tricky toured the country as a supporting act for the alternative rock singer-songwriter PJ Harvey. According to Nielsen SoundScan, the album had sold 222,000 copies in the US by 2003. By 2012, it had sold over 500,000 copies worldwide. That same year, Tricky performed the entire album with Topley-Bird on 27 April at the Sundance London festival, which was their first onstage appearance together in 15 years.

== Critical reception and legacy ==
Professional ratings
Aggregate scores
Source	Rating
AnyDecentMusic?	9.0/10
Review scores
Source	Rating
AllMusic	5/5 stars
Christgau's Consumer Guide	A+
Encyclopedia of Popular Music	5/5 stars
Entertainment Weekly	A
Mojo	5/5 stars
NME	9/10
Pitchfork	9.3/10
Q	5/5 stars
Rolling Stone	4/5 stars
Spin	8/10

Maxinquaye received widespread acclaim from contemporary critics. Reviewing in March 1995 for Mojo, Jon Savage called it a very ambitious and musically audacious work that brilliantly explored the disparities in Britain's social structure, with Topley-Bird as the "dominant voice" articulating Tricky's vision of uncertainty in an ever-changing world. Dele Fadele from NME said the record was unprecedented, spellbinding and revealed something new with every listen. He found Tricky's production innovative and his fusion of various sounds so seamless, "you can't label the results under any existing genre". David Bennun of Melody Maker deemed the album almost perfect and Tricky's music highly "gripping, original, sublime, his lyrics so abstruse and woven into the sound, that they become inseparable". Maxinquaye's combination of "dreamlike ambient music and hip-hop bite" was praised by the Los Angeles Times critic Robert Hilburn for giving Tricky's "soundscapes about contemporary life such a seductive and provocative edge". In Q magazine, Tom Doyle credited Topley-Bird's singing for making Maxinquaye "a highly inventive and intoxicating collection" while declaring that "with this debut, Tricky proves himself to be more challenging and eclectic than his peers".

At the end of 1995, Maxinquaye was named the year's best record in critics polls conducted by several English publications, including NME, Melody Maker and The Wire. It also finished second in the voting for the Pazz & Jop, an annual poll of American critics. The record received a nomination for the 1995 Mercury Prize, an annual music award given to the best album from the UK and Ireland, losing out to Portishead's 1994 debut Dummy.

Along with Massive Attack's Blue Lines, Maxinquaye was hailed by journalists as the pivotal release in what they were calling "trip hop" music; Jon Pareles, the chief critic at The New York Times, called it the genre's "first album-length masterpiece". Tricky disliked the term, saying "I was supposed to have invented trip hop, and I will fucking deny having anything to do with it". Writing years later for Stylus Magazine, Hebert argued that "there's too much here to be sequestered to any genre, let alone that one ... Calling Tricky 'trip-hop' is a bit like calling Prince 'pop'. It's partially accurate, but the music is so much better than that." In Mojo, Victoria Segal later called Maxinquaye "an exotic, erotic alien that nobody (not least its creator) has managed to clone". It was also dubbed "the British postmodern album of the 90s" by Jason Draper of Record Collector and "a visionary post-rock statement" by The Philadelphia Inquirer's Tom Moon, while AllMusic's senior editor Stephen Thomas Erlewine said it remains "a bracing sonic adventure that gains richness and resonance with each listen" because of the songs' imaginative structures and exceptional use of "noise and experimental music". By the end of the 1990s, Christgau had come to view Maxinquaye as among the decade's most essential albums. In The Village Voice, he wrote that its enduring significance lies in an aesthetic of cool derived from the blues and African-American culture, which valued a self-possessed resolve in the face of oppression:

What stands out isn't the dolor pop generalists noticed at the time, but the listenability that induced them to bother: Martina's pervasive lyricism, beats that are buoyant at any speed, a profusion of sweet-tempered [keyboard] effects that signify melody, harmony, strings. It's still pretty morose, sure. But nothing in its bitter passivity and contained rage comes off as a defeat or a sham ... Maxinquaye had that kind of cool. With blues replications per se having worn out their formal gris-gris, it voiced and embraced a grim new resignation about freedom, power, race and human connection in the postwelfare state – and simultaneously counteracted it.

Maxinquaye has frequently appeared on authoritative lists of the greatest albums, including NME's 2013 list of the 500 greatest albums, which ranked it 202nd best. Uncut named it 156th best on a similar list in 2016. It was ranked high in a Q-published poll determining the 100 greatest British albums, Mojo's "100 Modern Classics" and Rolling Stone's "Essential Recordings of the 90s", among other lists. The record was also ranked 66th on Pitchfork's list of the 100 best albums from the 1990s, with the site's guest writer Rollie Pemberton crediting the record for helping shape "the landscapes of modern electronica and underground hip-hop". Slant Magazine named it the 21st greatest electronic album of the 20th century and wrote that along with Blue Lines and Dummy, it was also "one of the most influential trip-hop albums of the '90s". In 2015, it was placed at number one on Fact magazine's list of the 50 best trip hop albums, with an accompanying essay saying it contains "some of the most tortured and original electronic music cut to wax" which "left an indelible mark on British music, electronic and otherwise". It was included in the music reference book 1001 Albums You Must Hear Before You Die; the journalist Alex Rayner wrote in an accompanying chapter that the "innovative, thought provoking and intricately arranged" album played a significant role in popularising British hip hop and spoken word music in the UK.

== Track listing ==
No.	Title	Producer(s)	Length
1.	"Overcome"	Mark Saunders; Tricky	4:30
2.	"Ponderosa"	Howie B; Tricky	3:31
3.	"Black Steel"	Saunders; Tricky	5:40
4.	"Hell Is Round the Corner"	Saunders; Tricky	3:47
5.	"Pumpkin"	Tricky	4:31
6.	"Aftermath"	Kevin Petrie; Tricky	7:39
7.	"Abbaon Fat Tracks"	Tricky	4:27
8.	"Brand New You're Retro"	Saunders; Tricky	2:54
9.	"Suffocated Love"	Saunders; Tricky	4:53
10.	"You Don't"	Saunders; Tricky	4:39
11.	"Strugglin'"	Saunders; Tricky	6:39
12.	"Feed Me"	Saunders; Tricky	4:04

Notes

- All songs were written and composed by Tricky, except "Ponderosa" (Tricky, Howie B and an uncredited sample from Laxmikant–Pyarelal) and "Black Steel" (Carlton Ridenhour, Eric Sadler, and Hank Shocklee).
- All vocals were performed by Tricky and Martina Topley-Bird, except on "Pumpkin" (Tricky and Alison Goldfrapp) and "You Don't" (Tricky and Ragga).

== Personnel ==
Credits are adapted from the album's liner notes.

- Ali Staton – mixing ("Suffocated Love")
- Alison Goldfrapp – vocals ("Pumpkin")
- Andy Earl – photography
- Cally Callomon – art direction, design
- David Alvarez – art direction, design
- FTV – guitar, drums ("Black Steel")
- Howie B – composition, production
- James Stevenson – guitar ("Brand New, You're Retro")
- Kevin Petrie – production
- Mark Stewart – vocals
- Mark Saunders – keyboards ("Overcome"), guitar, production
- Martina Topley-Bird (erroneously credited as "Martine") – vocals
- Paul Rider – photography
- Pete Briquette – bass ("Suffocated Love")
- Ragga– vocals ("You Don't")
- Richard Baker – artwork
- Rob Crane – artwork
- Tony Wrafter – flute ("Aftermath")
- Tricky – composition, production, vocals
- Valerie Philips – photography

== Charts ==
=== Weekly charts ===
Chart (1995)	Peak position
Australian Albums (ARIA)	48
Belgian Albums (Ultratop Flanders)	29
Belgian Albums (Ultratop Wallonia)	42
Dutch Albums (Album Top 100)	64
German Albums (Offizielle Top 100)	76
New Zealand Albums (RMNZ)	23
Scottish Albums (OCC)	7
Swedish Albums (Sverigetopplistan)	18
UK Albums (OCC)	3

=== Year-end charts ===
Chart (1995)	Position
UK Albums (OCC)	68

== Certifications ==
Region	Certification	Certified units/sales
United Kingdom (BPI)	Gold	100,000^{^}
^{^} Shipments figures based on certification alone.

== See also ==
- NME Album of the Year
- Protection (Massive Attack album)

== Bibliography ==
- Allen, Jamie (9 November 2000). "Music critic Christgau delivers new guide to consumers". CNN.com.
- Anon. (1995). Maxinquaye (CD liner notes). Tricky. Island Records, 4th & B'way Records. BRCD 610 / 524 089-2.
- Anon. (20 February 1996). "The 1995 Pazz & Jop Critics Poll". The Village Voice. New York.
- Anon. (17 November 2003). "Top 100 Albums of the 1990s". Pitchfork. p. 4.
- Anon. (28 February 2012). "Tricky and Martina Topley-Bird to Perform for First Time in 15 Years at Sundance London". Music Week. London.(subscription required)
- Anon. (February 2016). "200 Greatest Albums of All Time". Uncut. No. 225. London. p. 37.
- Anon.[b] (n.d.). "Tricky - Maxinquaye - Reviews". Album of the Year.
- Anon.[c] (n.d.). "Maxinquaye by Tricky reviews". AnyDecentMusic?. Archived from the original on 9 June 2020.
- Anon.[d] (n.d.). "Tricky". Official Charts Company.
- Anon.[e] (n.d.). "Tricky – Maxinquaye". Hung Medien.
- Balazard, Sylvestre; Barnes, Jake; Barnes, Mike; Bell, Clive; et al. (January 1996). "Blessed Releases: Records of the Year". The Wire (143). London: 32 – via Exact Editions.(subscription required)
- Bennun, David (4 February 1995). "Tricky: Maxinquaye". Melody Maker. London.
- Bennun, David (20 February 2015). "20 Years On: Tricky's Maxinquaye Revisited". The Quietus.
- Browne, David (2 June 1995). "Maxinquaye". Entertainment Weekly. New York. Archived from the original on 12 December 2022.
- Buskin, Richard (June 2007). "Classic Tracks: Tricky 'Black Steel'". Sound on Sound. Cambridge.
- Byers, Will (10 September 2008). "School of Rock: The Power of Production". guardian.co.uk.
- Christgau, Robert (March 1995). "Tricky, John Prine, Dance Hits U.K." Playboy. Chicago.
- Christgau, Robert (6 June 1995). "Consumer Guide". The Village Voice. New York.
- Christgau, Robert (9 June 1998). "Thwocks and Whispers". The Village Voice. New York.
- Christgau, Robert (2000). "CG Book '90s: T". Christgau's Consumer Guide: Albums of the '90s. St. Martin's Griffin. ISBN 0312245602 – via robertchristgau.com.
- Cinquemani, Sal (30 June 2002a). "2520: The 25 Greatest Electronic Albums of the 20th Century". Slant Magazine.
- Cinquemani, Sal (2 November 2002b). "Tricky: Maxinquaye". Slant Magazine. Archived from the original on 15 December 2008.
- Cohen, Jason; Krugman, Michael (October 1996). "The Madness of King Tricky I". Ray Gun. Santa Monica.
- Doyle, Tom (March 1995). "Tricky: Maxinquaye". Q (102). London.
- Draper, Jason (2009). "Tricky – Maxinquaye: Deluxe Edition". Record Collector (370). London.
- Erlewine, Stephen Thomas [a] (n.d.). "Tricky". AllMusic.
- Erlewine, Stephen Thomas [b] (n.d.). "Maxinquaye – Tricky". AllMusic.
- Fadele, Dele (18 February 1995). "The Severn Alliance". NME. London.
- Fisher, Mark (August 2008). "Tricky Unedited". The Wire (294). London.
- Flick, Larry (13 May 1995). "Island Records Makes Waves on the Dancefloor". Billboard. Vol. 107, no. 19. New York.
- Fox, Killian (11 July 2010). "Martina Topley Bird: 'I played Boggle till 4am the Other Night. Is That Rock'n'roll Enough for You?'". The Observer. London. The New Review section.
- Hebert, Kenan (1 September 2003). "Tricky – Maxinquaye – On Second Thought". Stylus Magazine. Archived from the original on 8 December 2015.
- Hilburn, Robert (31 December 1995). "Year in Review 1995". Los Angeles Times.
- Howe, Rupert (December 2009). "Tricky: Maxinquaye". Q (281). London.
- Hunter, James (15 June 1995). "Tricky: Maxinquaye". Rolling Stone. New York. Archived from the original on 29 May 2009.
- Kaye, Ben (25 October 2013). "The Top 500 Albums of All Time, according to NME". Consequence of Sound.
- Kessler, Ted (14 January 1995). "Tricky Up Your Ears". NME. London.
- Kot, Greg (15 September 1995). "Shoot From the Hip-Hop". Chicago Tribune.
- Larkin, Colin (2011). Encyclopedia of Popular Music (5th ed.). Omnibus Press. ISBN 978-0-85712-595-8.
- Lynskey, Dorian (20 March 2012). "Tricky: 'I Thought I'd Be an Underground Artist. I Was Not Ready'". guardian.co.uk.
- McKeating, Scott (8 December 2003). "Tricky: An Incredible Weed Smoking, Trip-Hop Denying, Paranoid, Schizophrenic World". Stylus Magazine. Archived from the original on 4 March 2016.
- Moon, Tom (29 June 2001). "Tricky Does The Trick With Agile And Versatile 'Blowback'". The Philadelphia Inquirer.
- O'Hagan, Sean (20 June 2004). "60 Maxinquaye, Tricky". The Observer. London. The 100 Greatest British Albums.
- Paoletta, Michael (31 May 2003). "After Uneven Sales, Tricky Exposes 'Vulnerable' Side". Billboard. Vol. 115, no. 22. New York.
- Pareles, Jon (4 January 1996). "The Pop Life". The New York Times.
- Pride, Dominic (15 April 1995). "Trip-Hop Steps Out". Billboard. Vol. 107, no. 15. New York.
- Rayner, Alex (2010). "Maxinquaye". In Dimery, Robert (ed.). 1001 Albums You Must Hear Before You Die: Revised and Updated Edition. Universe Publishing. ISBN 978-0-7893-2074-2.
- Reynolds, Simon (28 May 1995). "Pop View – Another City, Another New Sound". The New York Times.
- Reynolds, Simon (2013). "Sounds of Paranoia: Trip Hop, Tricky and Pre-Millennium Tension, 1990–97". Generation Ecstasy: Into the World of Techno and Rave Culture. Routledge. ISBN 978-1-136-78317-3.
- Savage, Jon (March 1995). "Tricky: Maxinquaye". Mojo (16). London. Archived from the original on 14 April 2016.
- Savage, Jon (1 November 2009). "Tricky: Maxinquaye". The Observer. London.
- Segal, Victoria (December 2009). "Tricky: Maxinquaye". Mojo (193). London.
- Shields, Andy (2003). "Tricky". In Buckley, Peter (ed.). The Rough Guide to Rock. Rough Guides. ISBN 1-84353-105-4.
- Strong, Martin C. (2006). The Essential Rock Discography. Canongate U.S. ISBN 1-84195-860-3.
- Twells, John; Finton, Laurent (30 July 2015). "The 50 best trip-hop albums of all time". Fact. London.
- Walsh, Ben (30 April 2012). "Tricky, IndigO2, O2 Arena". The Independent. London.
- Walters, Barry (June 1995). "Spins". Spin. 11 (3). New York.
- Weheliye, Alexander G. (2005). Phonographies: Grooves in Sonic Afro-Modernity. Duke University Press. ISBN 0822386933.
