= Clark (album) =

Studio album by Clark
- Released: 3 November 2014
- Recorded: 2014; Madison's Barn, near Newton, Lincolnshire
- Genres: IDM; electro; techno; bass music; ambient
- Length: 47:10
- Label: Warp Records
- Producer: Chris Clark

Clark chronology
Feast / Beast (2013)	Clark (2014)	The Last Panthers (2016)

Professional ratings
Aggregate scores
Source	Rating
AnyDecentMusic?	8.1/10
Metacritic	83/100
Review scores
Source	Rating
AllMusic	4/5 stars
Clash	9/10
Drowned in Sound	9/10
Exclaim!	9/10
Mojo	4/5 stars
Pitchfork	8.3/10
PopMatters	8/10
Resident Advisor	3.5/5
Uncut	7/10
XLR8R	8.5/10

Clark is the seventh studio album by British electronic musician Clark (Chris Clark), released on 3 November 2014 by Warp Records. It is his fifth album released under the shortened moniker Clark, following Iradelphic (2012). Clark wrote and recorded the album over a continuous four-month session in an isolated barn near Newton, Lincolnshire, marking the first time he had made an entire album in one location and one sustained creative period.

The album represented a return to dancefloor-oriented material after the more pastoral, acoustic-inflected Iradelphic, with Warp describing it as "more Berghain than Guggenheim". Clark received widespread critical acclaim and a Metacritic score of 83 out of 100, with Pitchfork awarding it Best New Music. It was named the 48th best album of 2014 by Pitchfork and the 13th best by Vice.

== Background ==
After releasing Iradelphic in 2012 — an album that leaned toward acoustic guitars, folktronica, and vocal collaborations — Clark signalled a change of direction with the Superscope single (March 2014), which introduced a harder, more dancefloor-focused sound. Around the same period, Clark debuted his Phosphor live audio-visual show at Koko, London in December 2013, featuring oscilloscope-driven visuals by experimental artist Vincent Oliver.

For the self-titled album, Clark rented a barn near Newton in Lincolnshire and worked in isolation for four months, departing from his usual practice of sketching tracks across multiple environments. He left behind his Berlin studio, which had accumulated extensive hardware, and brought only minimal equipment. Clark adopted a regimented daily routine, working twelve-hour sessions, then reading and going for walks. He described the experience as "voluntary enforced isolation", emphasising the creative benefits of disconnection.

Clark chose to self-title the album as a deliberate artistic statement. He told Inverted Audio: "It was quite a bold thing to do because it's almost a summation of everything you've done, that's how I see the concept of the eponymous album." He felt the record was strong enough to warrant the name, describing an unusual sense of satisfaction upon its completion.

== Recording and production ==
The album marked Clark's transition from Logic Pro to Ableton Live as his primary digital audio workstation. His Logic arrangements had typically contained around sixty tracks with timelines stretching for an hour; in Ableton, his song files became substantially more streamlined. He described the album as "basically a computer album", stating that "computers as music-making tools are just too good to ignore these days."

Clark's hardware setup was deliberately minimal. He used a Bustard summing bus mixer, a Chandler compressor, and a rented Jupiter synthesiser (used prominently on "The Grit in the Pearl"), alongside Sennheiser 8060 and 8070 rifle microphones for field recording. His production workflow involved extensive processing chains in Ableton: freezing audio, printing, re-pitching, and transcribing sounds into sample libraries, with multiple processing layers designed to obscure the original sound source.

A major element of the album's production was extensive field recording from the natural surroundings. Clark stated: "I wanted to let the weather in with this album. It's outward looking, it's drenched in sounds of the outside world, sounds free from human intervention: branches crackling in the wind, storms brewing, the stillness of settling snow." Specific field recordings included close-miked sounds of snow being compressed by boots, a chair being scraped across a stone floor in a Leipzig cotton factory, creaky doors, and storm recordings. The recordings were, as Clark noted, "heavily processed and tweaked", with the Sennheiser microphones sometimes being "almost too good", prompting him to add plug-ins to degrade the sound quality intentionally.

The album was mastered by Clark and Guy Davie of Electric Mastering, London.

== Music ==
Clark conceived the album as a unified work rather than a collection of separate tracks. He told The Skinny: "I wanted it to be monolithic; vast... It's one long slab of electronic music." The album has a pronounced wintery aesthetic, which Clark developed despite recording during spring, noting the strangeness of "making this crisp, atmospheric winter sounding record on pretty, balmy spring days."

The album opens with "Ship Is Flooding", a brief introduction featuring gothic organ tones, low braying horns, and brittle percussion that establishes a mournful atmosphere. The central sequence of dancefloor-oriented tracks includes "Unfurla", a five-minute techno piece built around piano, xylophone, and synths over insistent drums, and "Sodium Trimmers", which Resident Advisor described as refracting Berlin techno through a distorting IDM lens. "Banjo", titled ironically after an arpeggio that bears no resemblance to the instrument, blends Detroit electro with chaotic beat manipulation.

Quieter passages are interspersed throughout. "Strength Through Fragility" features a grand piano loop that XLR8R described as sounding "as if it's being played outdoors in a howling winter gale", layered with field recordings of thunder and snow. "Snowbird" combines processed vocal chops with glockenspiel, creating what The Quietus called a "becalming, nostalgic, almost pastoral" effect, with Clark revealing that all the drums on the track were created from recordings of boots scraping through snow. The seven-minute "There's a Distance in You", the album's longest track, transitions from ambient pads to dancefloor rhythms, combining contrasting emotional registers. The closing track "Everlane" was Clark's personal favourite; he wrote it in approximately twenty minutes as an early-morning live jam and chose not to overwork it further.

XLR8R characterised the album as "an ambient album masquerading as a techno record", noting that kickdrums appear on only slightly more than half of the thirteen tracks. Resident Advisor identified bass music as the primary inspiration, with additional influences from garage, Detroit electro, Berlin techno, and IDM. AllMusic classified the album under experimental techno, ambient techno, and club/dance.

== Release and promotion ==
Clark announced the album in September 2014 alongside the advance track "Unfurla". A second track, "The Grit in the Pearl", premiered on The Fader in October 2014. The album was released on 3 November 2014 on Warp Records (catalogue number WARP251). The vinyl and CD editions featured a die-cut sleeve with two art card inserts displaying different images through a cut-out of Clark's face.

A limited 12-inch single titled Edits was released on 8 December 2014, containing reworks by Marcel Dettmann ("Sodium Trimmers") and Pariah ("Banjo"). A follow-up EP, Flame Rave, was released on 23 March 2015, containing new material alongside reworks of album tracks "Springtime Linn" (from "Winter Linn") and "Unfurla Cremated" (from "Unfurla").

=== Music videos ===
The "Superscope" video, directed by Vincent Oliver of Adoxo, was made entirely with a cathode ray oscilloscope in a single continuous shot with no video effects or editing, using layered tones from test tone generators and synthesisers to create the imagery. The "Winter Linn" video, directed by Christopher Hewitt of Knucklehead, premiered on 13 November 2014 and featured three-dimensional images of organic forms and religious icons spinning through a black void. An animated video for "Beacon" was directed by Matti Gajek, featuring semi-real creatures and otherworldly landscapes.

== Touring ==
Clark toured extensively in support of the album throughout late 2014 and 2015, performing his Phosphor live show, an audio-visual performance featuring oscilloscope-driven visuals created in real time by Vincent Oliver. Oliver fed audio signals from Clark's performance into an oscilloscope via Ableton Live and MIDI controllers, projecting the resulting patterns for the audience. Clark performed using analog synthesisers and Ableton, with much of the set improvised. He described the approach: "There's a lot of adrenaline in the sound because a lot of it is live analog and improvised, so it's a bit unhinged."

The autumn 2014 tour included CATCH Festival in Utrecht (31 October), Simple Things Festival in Glasgow (1 November, alongside Autechre and Nightmares on Wax), MIRA Festival in Barcelona (15 November), Showcase in Paris (21 November), The Hydra at Studio Spaces in London (22 November), Berghain in Berlin (3 December), and District 8 in Dublin (27 December). In 2015, Clark performed at Convergence at Village Underground in London (12 March), Big Ears Festival in Knoxville (March), and The Warehouse Project in Manchester (November 2015) as part of the Modeselektion event.

== Critical reception ==
Clark received widespread critical acclaim. At Metacritic, which assigns a normalised rating from reviews, the album scored 83 out of 100 based on 15 reviews, indicating "universal acclaim".

Drowned in Sound awarded the album 9 out of 10 and called it "his finest hour to date; an LP that firmly cements his place at the very top level of contemporary electronic artistry" and "a near perfect distillation of his oeuvre to date". The Quietus praised it as "an album of unsettling beauty and exceptional skill", noting that it "captures much of the depth, adventurousness and unpredictability which made Body Riddle so special, draws together the best aspects of his more recent albums, and supplies numerous newer pleasures of its own." Clash gave it 9 out of 10 and described the album as simultaneously "fragile yet utterly destructive". AllMusic's Andy Kellman highlighted the singular production touches and field recordings, calling the album "Clark's most exhilarating work yet".

Ryan Dombal of Pitchfork awarded the album 8.3 out of 10 with a Best New Music designation, describing it as "45 minutes of vivid atmosphere and controlled chaos" and noting that it "adds a fresh layer of grandiosity that hints at festival-sized dance music or even Trent Reznor's churning soundtrack work." XLR8R called it "an exceptional album" and "a subtle reassertion of his artistic identity", characterising it as "an ambient album masquerading as a techno record." Exclaim! rated it 9 out of 10 and called it "anomalous but deeply rewarding", the kind of release "you could easily live inside for weeks and still find interesting nooks every single day."

Several reviews noted the album's unfortunate timing alongside Aphex Twin's Syro, also released on Warp in 2014. The Quietus observed that it fell "neatly into the shadow cast by the recent release of Aphex Twin's similarly excellent Syro", cautioning that it might not receive the attention it deserved.

=== Year-end lists ===
Publication	Rank
Pitchfork — 50 Best Albums of 2014	48
Vice — 50 Best Albums of 2014	13
AllMusic — Favourite Electronic Albums of 2014	Listed
PopMatters — Best Electronic Albums of 2014	Listed

== Track listing ==
No.	Title	Length
1.	"Ship Is Flooding"	1:08
2.	"Winter Linn"	3:08
3.	"Unfurla"	5:26
4.	"Strength Through Fragility"	2:18
5.	"Sodium Trimmers"	3:39
6.	"Banjo"	2:40
7.	"Snowbird"	4:05
8.	"The Grit in the Pearl"	4:47
9.	"Beacon"	2:57
10.	"Petroleum Tinged"	1:37
11.	"Silvered Iris"	3:31
12.	"There's a Distance in You"	7:06
13.	"Everlane"	4:48
Total length:		47:10

Japanese bonus track
No.	Title	Length
14.	"Treat"	3:38

Edits 12-inch single
No.	Title	Length
1.	"Sodium Trimmers (Marcel Dettmann Edit)"
2.	"Banjo (Pariah Edit)"

== Charts ==
Chart (2014)	Peak position	Belgian Albums (Ultratop Flanders)	122	US Heatseekers Albums (Billboard)	20	US Top Dance Albums (Billboard)	17
