= The Last Panthers (album) =

Soundtrack album by Clark
- Released: 18 March 2016
- Genre: ambient; modern classical; experimental electronic
- Length: 48:35
- Label: Warp Records
- Producer: Clark

Clark chronology
Clark (2014)	The Last Panthers (2016)	Death Peak (2017)

The Last Panthers is a soundtrack album by British electronic musician Clark, released on 18 March 2016 on Warp Records. The album comprises 19 tracks drawn from and inspired by Clark's score for the Franco-British television series The Last Panthers (2015), which was co-produced by Warp Films. It was Clark's first standalone soundtrack release. The album received generally favourable reviews, with an aggregate score of 79 out of 100 on Metacritic. It peaked at number 45 on the UK Independent Albums Chart.

== Background ==
Clark composed approximately 60 tracks for the six-episode television series The Last Panthers, which aired on Sky Atlantic and Canal+ in 2015. When he listened back to the final cues arranged in broadcast order, he felt the result did not work as an album, describing it as too linear and clinical. Clark undertook what he called "an immense chiselling/editing mission" to reshape the score material into a standalone work, and wrote new material specifically for the album release.

Clark described the album's character as prioritising harmony and texture over rhythm, calling it "a continuous slab of liquid melancholy". In a later interview, he discussed using noise as a compositional tool, explaining that the album employs subtle ambient noise to build tension beneath the surface. The album was released on Warp Records, Clark's primary label, rather than on a dedicated soundtrack label. It was issued on vinyl LP, CD, and as a digital download.

== Music ==
The Last Panthers is a largely beatless, atmospheric work, described by reviewers as spanning ambient, modern classical and experimental electronic territory. The album's instrumentation includes pianos, strings, choral vocals, guitar, glockenspiel, modular synthesisers and other electronics, with live drums appearing sparingly. Drowned in Sound noted the album's conspicuous absence of beats and its stubbornly consistent sombre mood, comparing the decayed piano textures to Air's Virgin Suicides score, and drawing parallels with the work of William Basinski and Nils Frahm. Resident Advisor highlighted connections to earlier Clark albums, with comparisons to the piano work on Iradelphic and the operatic narrative scope of the self-titled Clark (2014).

The 19 tracks range from under a minute to over five minutes in length and form what Resident Advisor described as "a seamless narrative" with a controlled palette. Track titles reference characters and locations from the television series, including Belgrade, Khalil, Naomi and Zvlatko. The three-part "Hide on the Treads" suite closes the album.

== Critical reception ==
Professional ratings
Aggregate scores
Source	Rating
Metacritic	79/100
Review scores
Source	Rating
AllMusic	4/5 stars
Drowned in Sound	8/10
MusicOMH	4/5 stars
Pitchfork	7.1/10
PopMatters	7/10
Resident Advisor	3.9/5

The Last Panthers received generally favourable reviews from music critics. At Metacritic, the album holds an aggregate score of 79 out of 100, based on 11 critic reviews.

Drowned in Sound gave the album 8 out of 10, praising its atmospheric depth and noting comparisons to scores by Ólafur Arnalds, Ben Frost and Mogwai. Headphone Commute recommended the album, describing it as ambient, modern classical and experimental in scope. Resident Advisor offered a detailed track-by-track assessment, noting that the album showcased Clark's range while maintaining a cohesive mood, and drew comparisons to Aphex Twin's Drukqs and Brian Eno.

== Track listing ==
All tracks are written by Christopher Stephen Clark.

No.	Title	Length
1.	"Back to Belgrade"	3:39
2.	"Hiero-Bosch for Khalil"	2:59
3.	"Diamonds Aren't Forever"	2:29
4.	"Panthers Bass Plock"	0:56
5.	"Chloroform Sauna"	1:35
6.	"Serbian Daffodil"	1:06
7.	"Naomi Pleen"	1:56
8.	"Open Foe"	2:08
9.	"Strangled to Death in a Public Toilet"	3:15
10.	"Cryogenic"	2:46
11.	"Brother Killer"	1:36
12.	"Omni Vignette"	2:18
13.	"Actual Jewels"	2:22
14.	"Dead Eyes for Zvlatko / Heaven Theme"	3:07
15.	"Diamonds Aren't Forever II"	5:16
16.	"Upward Evaporation"	5:06
17.	"Hide on the Treads 1"	1:52
18.	"Hide on the Treads 2"	1:56
19.	"Hide on the Treads 3"	2:09
Total length:		48:35

== Charts ==
Chart	Peak position
UK Independent Albums (OCC)	45
US Top Dance Albums (Billboard)	21

== Personnel ==
Credits adapted from Discogs.

- Clark – writing, production, performance
- Lupo – mastering (at Calyx Mastering)
- Dominic Flannigan – design
- Stéphane Remael – photography
