= Need One =

Single by Martina Topley-Bird

from the album Quixotic
- Released: 2 June 2003
- Genre: Trip hop, indie rock
- Length: 3:58 (album version); 3:24 (radio edit)
- Label: Independiente
- Songwriter(s): Nicholas Freeman Bird, Stephen Paul Crittall, John Alexander McGowan, Martina Topley-Bird

Martina Topley-Bird singles chronology
"Need One" (2003)	"Anything" (2003)

Alternative covers
- English promo

Alternative cover
- French promo

"Need One" is a song by British singer Martina Topley-Bird, released as the first single from the album Quixotic. It was released on 2 June 2003 and reached #76 on the UK Singles Chart. A music video was shot for this song.

== Track listings ==
=== Commercial release ===
CD

1. "Need One" – 3:58
2. "Hours Away" – 4:32
3. "Need One" (Fabien's Mix) – 4:20

=== Promotional releases ===
Early promo CD-R ("New Mix")

1. "Need One" (radio edit) – 3:21
2. "Need One" (album version) – 3:55

The promo CD-R is mistakenly called "New Mix", but in fact it features the same radio edit and album version as on the later releases.

1-track promo CD

1. "Need One" (radio edit) – 3:24

Promo 12"

- A-Side
  1. "Need One" – 3:50
- B-Side
  1. "Need One" (Riton's Fashion Mix) – 6:13
  2. "Need One" (Riton's Glitter Mix) – 4:48

Promo CD-R

1. "Need One" (Riton's Fashion Mix) – 6:14
2. "Need One" (Riton's Glitter Mix) – 4:50
