= The Blue God =

Studio album by Martina Topley-Bird
- Released: 12 May 2008
- Genre: Trip hop; electronica; psychedelic pop; art pop; soul; indie rock
- Length: 39:17
- Label: Independiente
- Producer: Martina Topley-Bird; Danger Mouse

Martina Topley-Bird chronology
Quixotic (2003)	The Blue God (2008)	Some Place Simple (2010)

Professional ratings
Review scores
Source	Rating
BBC.co.uk	(positive)
Hot Press	4/5 stars
Manchester Evening News	4/5 stars
musicOMH	4/5 stars
Pitchfork Media	4.6/10
Prefix Magazine	7/10 stars
The Times	4/5 stars
Twisted Ear	3.5/5 stars

The Blue God is the second studio album by British singer-songwriter Martina Topley-Bird, her first in five years. It was released on 12 May 2008, and produced by Danger Mouse.

The track "Carnies" was released as the first single on 3 March 2008 and reached No. 20 on the UK Indie Charts. "Poison" was released as the second single and reached No. 9 on the Indie Charts. The album reached number 88 on the UK Albums Chart in its first week of release.

== Background ==
The album had been complete since at least September 2007. Since then, Topley-Bird slowly revealed track titles and posted songs from the album on her official website and her MySpace page.

== Singles ==
The album was preceded by its first single, "Carnies," on 3 March 2008. "Poison," the second single, was released on 5 May 2008. The single's B-side, "Soldier Boy", is a collaboration with Gorillaz & Roots Manuva which interpolates certain elements of the Gorillaz' demo "Snakes & Ladders". The third single from the album, "Baby Blue," was released as a digital download on 7 September 2008.

== Reception ==
The album received generally positive critical reception; the BBC said it "warps reflections of Ella Fitzgerald, two-tone ska, dark psychedelia and Pentangle's 'acid folk' into unsettling shapes ... It's an often astonishing album and one which, if Tricky's forthcoming comeback can't match it, may curse him to be known as 'that bloke who used to rap with Martina Topley Bird.'"

== Track listing ==
No.	Title	Writer(s)	Length
1.	"Phoenix"	Topley-Bird	3:48
2.	"Carnies"	Topley-Bird	3:09
3.	"April Grove"	James G. Barbour	3:32
4.	"Something to Say"	Topley-Bird	3:26
5.	"Baby Blue"	Topley-Bird	2:27
6.	"Shangri La"	Topley-Bird	3:47
7.	"Snowman"	Topley-Bird	2:35
8.	"Da Da Da Da"	Topley-Bird	2:24
9.	"Valentine"	Topley-Bird	3:36
10.	"Poison"	Topley-Bird	2:58
11.	"Razor Tongue"	Topley-Bird	3:54
12.	"Yesterday"	Topley-Bird	3:41

== Charts ==
Chart (2008)	Peak position
UK Albums Chart	88
French Albums Chart	149
