= Some Place Simple =

Studio album by Martina Topley-Bird
- Released: 20 July 2010
- Genre: Electronic; indie rock; R&B; folk; roots; jazz-pop
- Length: 36:48
- Label: Honest Jon's
- Producer: Damon Albarn; Martina Topley-Bird

Martina Topley-Bird chronology
The Blue God (2008)	Some Place Simple (2010)	Forever I Wait (2021)

Professional ratings
Review scores
Source	Rating
AllMusic	4/5 stars
The Guardian	4/5 stars
musicOMH	4/5 stars

Some Place Simple is the third studio album by British singer-songwriter Martina Topley-Bird.

== Recording ==
Recorded and mixed at Damon Albarn's studio over a 3-week period in early 2010, the album consists of eleven stripped-down versions of previous songs, and four new ones composed for the record. The album was entirely performed by Martina, vocals, keyboard and ukulele, and Fergus Gerrand who toured with Martina as drummer, percussionist and guitarist with additional guitar by Claire Nicholson on Sandpaper Kisses. Composition contributions from Brian Burton, David Holmes, Chloe Paige, and Josh Klinghoffer.

Some of the tracks were cuts from Albarn's band Gorillaz' second album Demon Days. This is evident from the involvement of Albarn, Burton, Jason Cox, and Stephen Sedgwick, who all worked on Demon Days. Martina had previously recorded vocals on for the song "All Alone" on said-album.

== Track listing ==
All tracks are written by Martina Topley-Bird.

No.	Title	Length
1.	"Baby Blue"	2:47
2.	"Phoenix"	2:45
3.	"Lying"	3:49
4.	"Da Da Da"	1:20
5.	"Orchids"	2:59
6.	"Poison"	2:22
7.	"Intro"	1:30
8.	"Snowman"	2:39
9.	"Sandpaper Kisses"	3:36
10.	"All Day"	2:30
11.	"Ilyah"	3:05
12.	"Valentine"	3:34
13.	"Too Tuff to Die"	1:54
14.	"Kiss Kiss Kiss"	1:00
15.	"Harpsichord Kiss"	0:58
Total length:		36:48

== Personnel ==
- Martina Topley Bird – vocals, guitar, keyboard
- Fergus Gerrand – drums, percussion, guitar, kalimba
- Claire Nicholson – guitar, background vocals
- Jason Cox – engineering, mixing
- Stephen Sedgwick – engineering, mixing
