= Feast / Beast =

Compilation album by Clark
- Released: 16 September 2013
- Genre: Electronic; IDM
- Length: 137:06
- Label: Warp Records
- Producer: Clark

Clark chronology
Iradelphic (2012)	Feast / Beast (2013)	Clark (2014)

Feast / Beast is a compilation album by British electronic musician Clark, released on 16 September 2013 on Warp Records. The double album collects 29 remixes Clark produced for other artists over the preceding decade - including Massive Attack, Battles, Nils Frahm, Depeche Mode, Amon Tobin and HEALTH - alongside reworkings of his own material by Bibio and Nathan Fake. It was released between Clark's sixth studio album Iradelphic (2012) and his self-titled seventh album Clark (2014).

== Background ==
The album gathers remixes Clark had produced for other artists over the preceding decade, alongside exclusive and previously unreleased material including contributions from Bibio and Nathan Fake. Clark described the collection as representing the range of his output, stating that the remixes "are more unhinged - there is more freedom involved when using other people's material. And particularly when friends are involved, it can push you into electric new terrain". The album's artwork, based on an artist's interpretation of origami, influenced how Clark conceptualised the collection's structure.

The album is divided into two discs. The first, "Feast", collects Clark's more melodic and atmospheric remixes, while the second, "Beast", features harder, techno-oriented material.

== Critical reception ==
Professional ratings
Review scores
Source	Rating
Pitchfork	7.6/10
Drowned in Sound	8/10

Feast / Beast received positive reviews from music critics. Ruth Saxelby of Pitchfork gave the album 7.6 out of 10, calling it "an exceptional collection" that provides "an illuminating opportunity to listen through Clark's ears". Alex Baker of Drowned in Sound awarded 8 out of 10, noting that the album "makes sense and works when it really shouldn't" despite its length and diversity of collaborators. Heather Phares of AllMusic described it as "a thorough reminder of how prolific a remixer Clark was" and praised his versatility across the collection.

Philip Allen of Louder Than War placed Clark alongside Warp Records contemporaries Aphex Twin, Squarepusher and Amon Tobin, praising the collection's emotional depth and consistency. Release Magazine also reviewed the album favourably.

== Track listing ==
Disc one: Feast
No.	Title	Original artist	Length
1.	"Smoulderville (Clark remix)"	The Beige Lasers	2:30
2.	"Braid of Voices (Clark remix)"	D.M. Stith	5:21
3.	"Kitchen Sink (Clark remix)"	Amon Tobin	4:20
4.	"Fentiger (Clark remix)"	Nathan Fake	4:31
5.	"Alice (Redux)"	Clark	3:45
6.	"Glow (Clark remix)"	Kuedo	4:03
7.	"Spur (Clark remix)"	Barker & Baumecker	6:00
8.	"Cantstandtherain (Clark remix)"	Silverman	3:25
9.	"Let's Go (Clark remix)"	Rone	5:09
10.	"Peter (Clark remix)"	Nils Frahm	6:27
11.	"Bendir (Clark remix)"	Glen Velez	5:48
12.	"Absence (Bibio remix)"	Clark	6:28
13.	"Ted (Bibio remix)"	Clark	4:27
14.	"Sea (Clark remix)"	Vampillia	6:10
15.	"Cold Caby (Clark remix)"	Prince Myshkin	3:37

Disc two: Beast
No.	Title	Original artist	Length
1.	"Red Light (Clark remix)"	Massive Attack	4:26
2.	"My Machines (Clark remix)"	Battles	4:03
3.	"D&T (Clark remix)"	Letherette	4:30
4.	"Growls Garden (Nathan Fake remix)"	Clark	6:45
5.	"Dulceria (Clark remix)"	Aufgang	6:00
6.	"Let's Get Clinical (Clark remix)"	Maxïmo Park	4:19
7.	"Evil Beast (People in the Way) (Clark remix)"	the Terraformers	1:50
8.	"Suns of Temper (Bear Paw Kicks Version)"	Clark	5:01
9.	"Die Slow (Clark remix)"	HEALTH	4:23
10.	"Freestate (Clark remix)"	Depeche Mode	4:47
11.	"Siberian Hooty / Fallen Boy (Clark remix)"	Mr. Boggle	3:23
12.	"Hammersmashed (Clark remix)"	Drvg Cvltvre	4:52
13.	"Mr Bad News (Clark remix)"	Milanese	4:55
14.	"The Galactic Tusks (Clark remix)"	Feynman's Rainbow	5:50
