= Aftermath (Tricky song) =

1993 solo debut single by Tricky

Single by Tricky

from the album Maxinquaye
- Released: 24 January 1994
- Recorded: 1991–1993
- Genre: Trip hop
- Length: 7:38
- Label: Durban Poison; Fourth & Broadway; Island
- Songwriter: Adrian Thaws
- Producers: Tricky; Mark Saunders

Tricky singles chronology
"Aftermath" (1994)	"Ponderosa" (1994)

"Aftermath" is a song by English musician and producer Tricky from his debut studio album, Maxinquaye (1995). It was released on 24 January 1994 by 4th & B'way Records as the lead single from the album. Featuring vocals by Martina Topley-Bird, the song is widely cited as a foundational track of the trip hop genre, characterized by its slow tempo, heavy use of sampling, and the contrast between Topley-Bird's melodic vocals and Tricky's raspy, whispered delivery.

== Background and recording ==
Tricky wrote "Aftermath" while he was still a collaborator with the Bristol collective Massive Attack. He offered the track to the group for inclusion on their second album, Protection, but the song was rejected. They found the material too experimental, describing the demo as "too strange" and not fitting their sound. Following this rejection, Tricky decided to release the song independently.

The song features the debut performance of Martina Topley-Bird. Tricky met her when she was a teenager, sitting on a wall outside his house (other accounts cite a bus stop) in Bristol. Discovering she could sing, he invited her to record "Aftermath" in London with co-producer Mark Saunders. The recording session was minimalist; Saunders utilized an Akai S1000 sampler and an Atari 1040 computer to assemble the track. Saunders noted that Tricky's approach to production was non-linear and experimental, often requiring the producer to "un-learn" traditional studio techniques.

== Composition ==
"Aftermath" is built around several prominent samples. The primary melodic hook is sampled from Marvin Gaye's "That’s the Way Love Is". The song also features a dialogue sample from the 1982 film Blade Runner, specifically the line "Let me tell you about my mother," spoken by the character Leon Kowalski.

Musically, the track features a heavy, slow-moving bassline and a dense, atmospheric soundscape described as "hauntological" and "claustrophobic." The vocal arrangement consists of Topley-Bird's airy, melodic singing contrasted with Tricky's low, rasping whispers, which often mirror or shadow her lyrics. Tricky has attributed his vocal style on the track to a lack of confidence in his singing ability at the time, which led to a more intimate, spoken-word approach.

== Release ==
After the rejection by Massive Attack, Tricky funded a limited white label press of the song (approximately 500 to 1,000 copies) in late 1993, released through his own Durban Poison imprint. The underground success of the white label led to a contract with 4th & B'way Records, a subsidiary of Island Records. The single was commercially released on 24 January 1994, featuring several remixes, including the "Hip Hop Blues" mix and the "Version" mix.

== Reception and legacy ==
Upon release, "Aftermath" received critical acclaim. Melody Maker named it "Single of the Week," praising its innovative sound and departure from standard hip hop conventions. NME similarly lauded the track for its "stoned" atmosphere and "unsettling" production. Simon Reynolds later described the track as a definitive example of the "claustrophobic" Bristol sound.

The song is frequently cited as the launch of Tricky's solo career and a pivotal moment for the UK electronic music scene. Retrospective reviews have highlighted "Aftermath" as the catalyst for the "trip-hop explosion" of the mid-1990s. It established the aesthetic of his debut album Maxinquaye and marked the start of his long-term collaboration with Topley-Bird. Retrospective reviews from publications such as Pitchfork and The Guardian continue to rank the song as one of the most influential tracks of the 1990s.

== Track listing ==
CD single

No.	Title	Length
1.	"Aftermath (Version 1 Edit)"	4:01
2.	"Aftermath (Hip Hop Blues)"	7:40
3.	"Aftermath (I Could Be Looking For People Remix)"	5:11
4.	"Aftermath (Version 1)"	5:01

== Release history ==
Release dates and formats for "Aftermath"
Region	Date	Format(s)	Label(s)	Ref.
United Kingdom	24 January 1994	CD; 12-inch vinyl	4th & B'way	
