= Martina Topley-Bird =

English musician (born 1975)

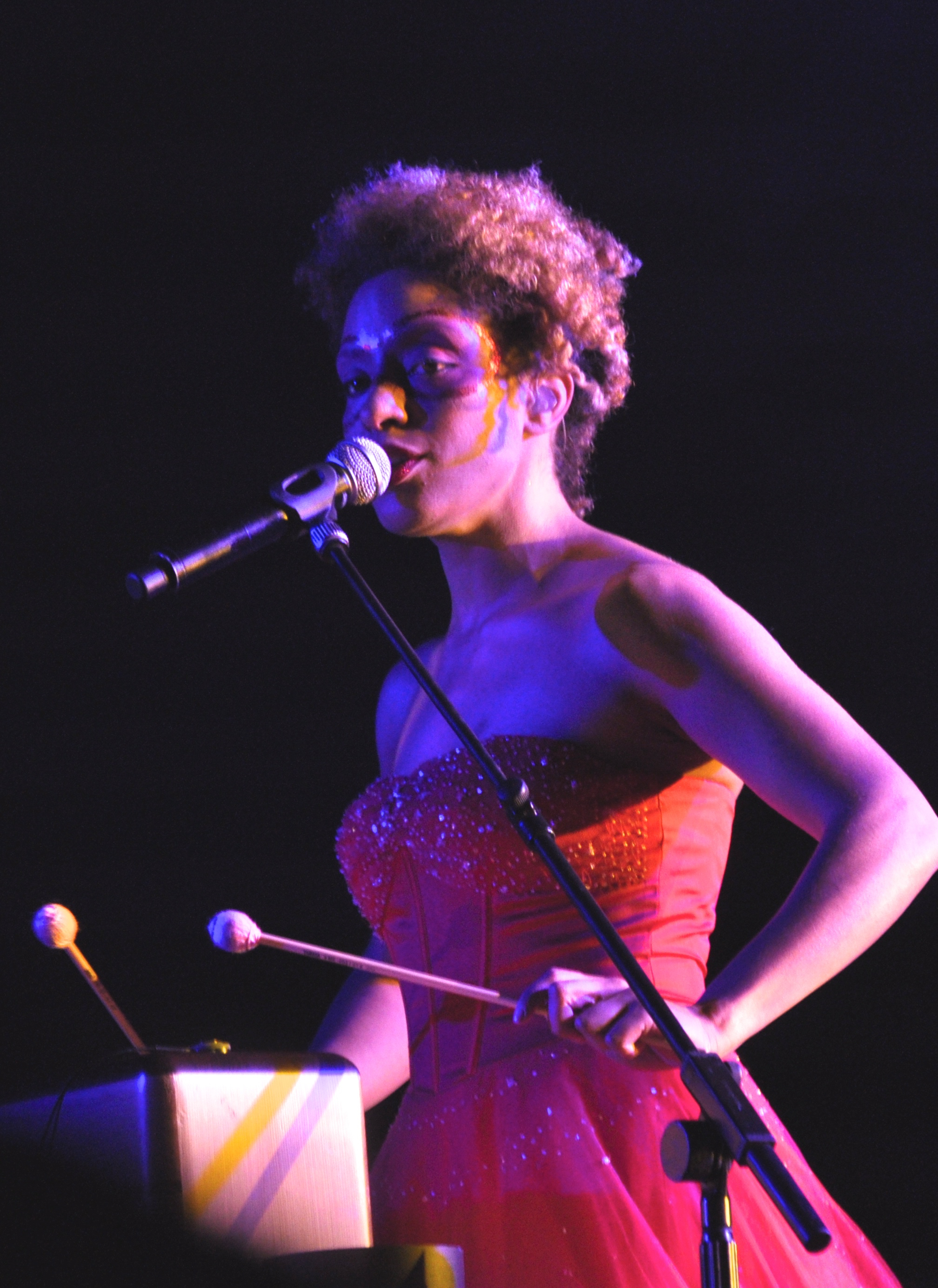
- Topley-Bird performing with Massive Attack at Conegliano in 2009

Background information
- Born: Martina Gillian Topley; 7 May 1975 (age 50); St Pancras, London, England
- Origin: Bristol, England
- Genres: Trip hop; indie pop; indie rock; alternative hip hop
- Occupations: Singer; songwriter; musician
- Instruments: Vocals; guitar; keyboards; ukulele; bass; drums; tambourine
- Years active: 1993–present
- Labels: Independiente; Honest Jon's

Martina Gillian Topley-Bird (née Topley; born 7 May 1975) is an English singer, songwriter, and multi-instrumentalist who first gained fame as the featured female vocalist on trip hop pioneer Tricky's debut album, Maxinquaye (1995). She also worked with him on his subsequent albums, Nearly God and Pre-Millennium Tension (both in 1996). In 2003, Topley-Bird released her debut solo album, Quixotic, which was critically praised and earned her a Mercury Prize nomination.

This was followed by Anything (2004), The Blue God (2008), and Some Place Simple (2010). She has also collaborated with Gorillaz, appearing on their album Demon Days (2005), as well as with Mark Lanegan, Diplo, and Massive Attack on Heligoland (2010), which she followed by a world tour with the group. Her song "Sandpaper Kisses" was covered by Stephen Marley and sampled by artists such as Berry Weight and The Weeknd and used in the video game Fahrenheit.

== Early life ==
Martina Topley-Bird was born in London, England, to Charlette Conlon (née Pouncey) and Martin Geoffrey Topley, who died in 1974 before her birth; Martina was named after him. Her stepfather is British direct marketing specialist Drayton Bird, whose surname she adopted in addition to her father's. Her mother is of Salvadoran and Seminole descent, while her father was of untraceable African-American descent. Topley-Bird grew up in a large family, with five siblings and three step-siblings.

Her family later relocated from London to Bristol. "We moved about a bit when I was a child, which wasn't a problem for me", she recalled. "If you're not white and middle-class, then you're slightly different and exotic in those new environments. I thrived, and survived, on those situations." She attended Clifton College, where she was a member of the school choir and took piano lessons.

Topley-Bird grew up listening to R&B, opera and soul music throughout her childhood. As a teenager, she began listening to alternative rock, and became a fan of The Sugarcubes, Faith No More and Jane's Addiction.

== Career ==
=== Collaboration with Tricky ===
In 1993, as a teenager at Clifton College, Topley-Bird was discovered by trip hop pioneer Tricky when he saw her sitting on a wall near his house, singing to herself. "That's really how it happened," she recalled. "It's one of those things people are always surprised to find out is true. I remember the graveyard behind the wall. A few weeks later, I went around to his house with some friends. We'd been drinking cider after our GCSEs. We were banging on his door, but he wasn't in. Then Mark Stewart, who lived there, came up to us and said: "Yeah, this is Tricky's house, jump in through the window." So I jumped through, opened the door and we got mashed."

She and Tricky formed a musical partnership, and Topley-Bird collaborated with Tricky as a featured vocalist on his debut album Maxinquaye (1995) (a printing error credited her as "Martine"). Almost all of her vocals on the album were recorded in a single take. In describing the recording sessions, she recalled: "It was totally instinctive. There was no time to drum up an alter ego. I liked the idea that the information people needed about me was what they would hear when they put the record on. Anything else was sort of extraneous. I didn't think there was anything in my biography that would explain my musical choices." Topley-Bird continued her collaboration with Tricky on his follow-up albums Nearly God (1996), Pre-Millennium Tension (1996) and Angels with Dirty Faces (1998).

=== Solo career ===
Following a deterioration of her professional and personal relationship with Tricky in 1998, Topley-Bird began pursuing a solo career. It was not until 2003 that she released her debut album, Quixotic through Independiente Records, which she recorded in Los Angeles, California. The record was mainly produced by Topley-Bird and production team AMP9 (Alex McGowan, Steve Crittall, Nick Bird) at Space Eko Recording Studios London. She commented on the ideas underpinning the album, saying:

A lot of it is about the notion of physical proximity relative to emotional connections between people. My dad, Martin Topley, died when he was twenty-nine. Between the release of Quixotic and now, I turned twenty-nine, and I started thinking about what I'd achieved in my life as a human being. Also I wanted to focus on the nature of my relationship with him and with my step father because of the way I felt those relationships were affecting my other relationships.

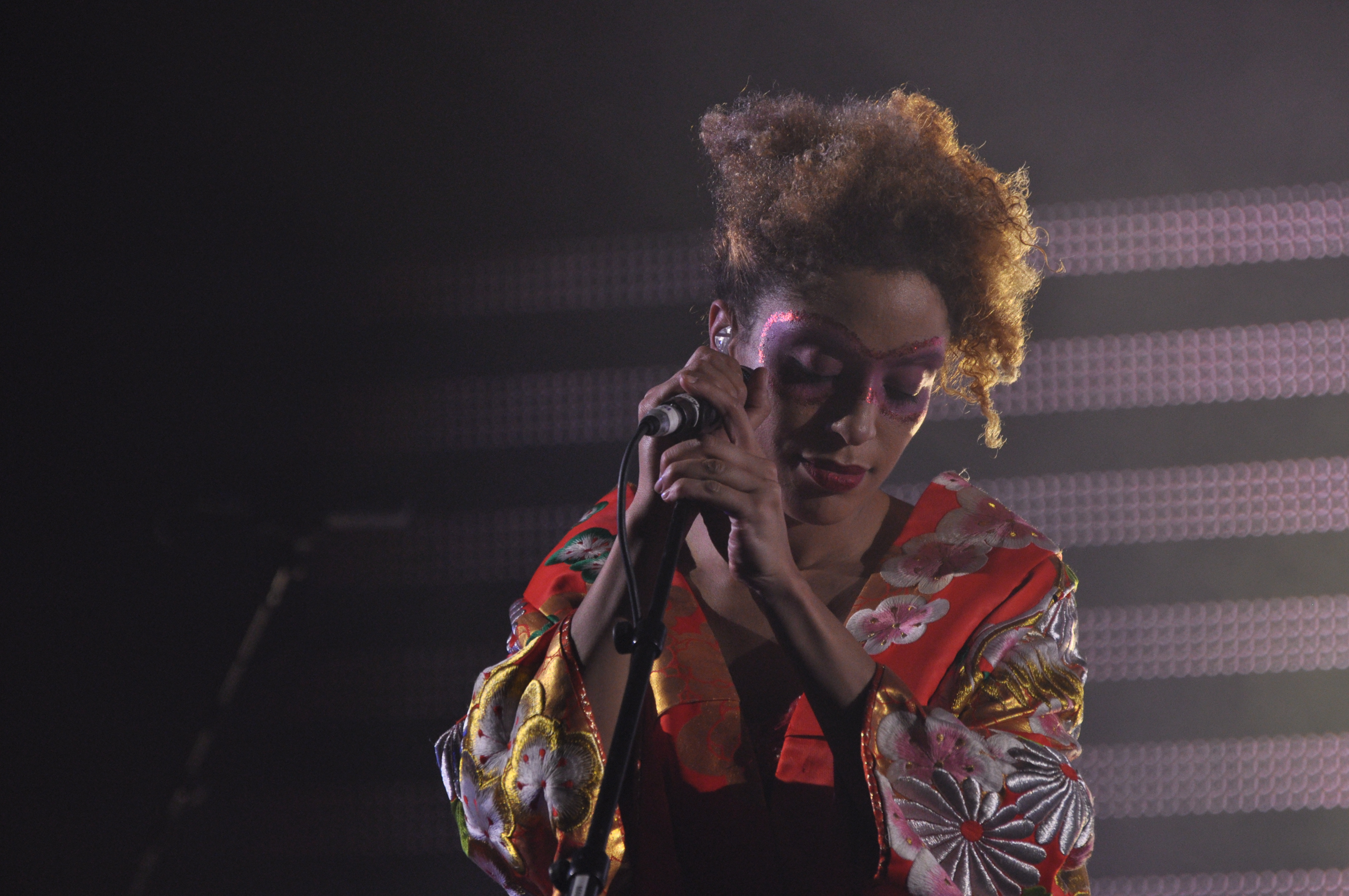
Topley-Bird performing with Massive Attack in Conegliano, 2009

Quixotic peaked at No. 70 on the UK Albums Chart, received positive reviews from critics, and was a finalist for the 2003 Mercury Music Prize. The album finally saw a limited release in the United States in July 2004, when the Palm Pictures label released a re-designed and re-sequenced version under the title Anything, which featured a shorter track listing and all-new cover art. The following year she appeared on the Starbucks compilation album Sweetheart 2005: Love Songs, which features contemporary musicians covering classic love songs. She sang "I Only Have Eyes for You", a song originally by composer Harry Warren and lyricist Al Dubin.

Her second solo album, The Blue God, was released in May 2008. The track "Carnies" was released as the first single on 3 March 2008 and reached No. 20 on the UK Indie Charts. "Poison" was released as the second single and reached No. 9 on the Indie Charts. The album received generally positive critical reception; the BBC said it "warps reflections of Ella Fitzgerald, two-tone ska, dark psychedelia and Pentangle's 'acid folk' into unsettling shapes ... It's an often astonishing album and one which, if Tricky's forthcoming comeback can't match it, may curse him to be known as 'that bloke who used to rap with Martina Topley Bird.'"

In 2010, Topley-Bird appeared on the album Heligoland by Massive Attack, lending her voice on the tracks "Psyche" and "Babel". She also toured with Massive Attack as their support act and providing guest vocals at their shows. Her third album, Some Place Simple, was released in July 2010. It contained stripped-down versions of songs from her first two releases, along with four new songs. Topley-Bird performed Maxinquaye live at the Sundance Festival, London, in April 2012, and also appeared on the tracks "Open" and "Secret" on electronic musician Clark's album Iradelphic. In 2013 contributed to a cover of the xx's "Crystalised" with Mark Lanegan and Warpaint, and also toured with Warpaint as a supporting act on their 2013 world tour. On 26 January 2015, she appeared as lead vocalist on title track "The Day is My Enemy", the second single of The Prodigy's, from their album The Day Is My Enemy (2015).

In 2018 Martina Topley-Bird released the single "Solitude", which would subsequently appear on the four-track EP MTB Continued.

In May 2021 Topley-Bird released the single "Pure Heart" from her album Forever I Wait released in September of the same year. In a The Guardian interview, Topley-Bird stated she was a lot happier with the end results compared to her previous albums. Also, noting it does not directly address the death of her daughter, largely being written beforehand.

== Influences ==
Topley-Bird cites Ella Fitzgerald and Billie Holiday as vocal influences, as well as Tom Waits and Serge Gainsbourg as instrumental influences. She has cited Bollywood and Asian cinema as an influence on her album artwork as well, including the work of Park Chan-wook.

== Personal life ==
Topley-Bird has an elder sister named Elizabeth. She had one daughter with Tricky. Mina Mazy (19 March 1995 – 8 May 2019) was born one month after the release of Maxinquaye. Mazy died by suicide after suffering a psychotic episode.

She has said that she does not consider herself religious, though she "believes in the need to have a healthy spiritual life".

As of 2021 she lived with her partner in Valencia, Spain.

== Discography ==
=== Albums ===
- Quixotic (2003) (UK)
  - Anything (2004) (Re-sequenced US version of Quixotic)
- The Blue God (2008)
- Some Place Simple (2010)
- Forever I Wait (2021)

=== Singles ===
- "Need One" (2003)
- "Anything" (2003)
- "I Still Feel" (2003)
- "Soul Food" (2004)
- "Carnies" (2008)
- "Poison" (2008)
- "Baby Blue" (2008)
- "Crystalised" (2013) (with Mark Lanegan and Warpaint)
- Solitude (2018)
- "Pure Heart" (2021)
- "Hunt" (2021)

=== Guest appearances ===
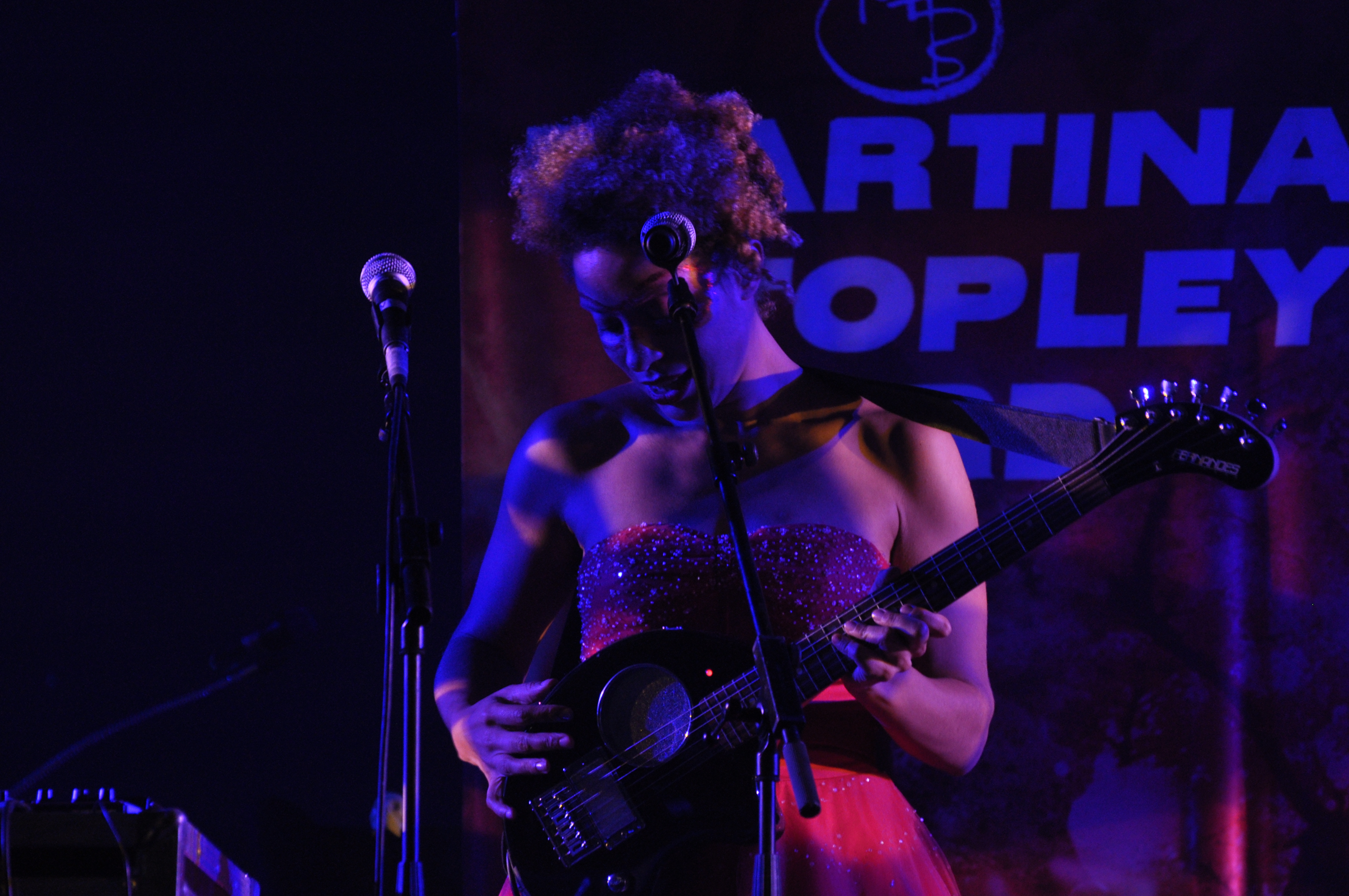
Topley-Bird performing with Massive Attack, 2009

- Tricky – "Overcome", "Ponderosa", "Black Steel", "Hell Is Round the Corner", "Aftermath", "Abbaon Fat Tracks", "Brand New You're Retro", "Suffocated Love", "Strugglin'" and "Feed Me" from Maxinquaye (1995)
- Tricky – "Black Coffee", "Children's Story", "I Be the Prophet", "Judas," and "Poems" from Nearly God (1996)
- Tricky – "Vent", "Christiansands", "Bad Dreams", "Makes Me Wanna Die", "Sex Drive", "Lyrics of Fury" and "My Evil Is Strong" from Pre-Millennium Tension (1996)
- Tricky – "Singing the Blues", "6 Minutes", "Analyze Me", "Talk to Me (Angels with Dirty Faces)", "Carriage for Two" and "Demise" from Angels with Dirty Faces (1998)
- Primus – "Dirty Drowning Man" and "Coattails of a Dead Man" from Antipop (1999)
- David Holmes – "Outrun" and "Zero Tolerance" from Bow Down to the Exit Sign (2000)
- Diplo – "Into the Sun" from Florida (2004)
- Gorillaz – "All Alone" from Demon Days (2005)
- Common – "Everywhere" from Universal Mind Control (2008)
- Leila – "Deflect" and "Why Should I?" from Blood Looms and Blooms (2008)
- Massive Attack – "Babel" and "Psyche" from Heligoland (2010)
- Clark – "Open", "Secret" and "The Pining Pt. 2" from Iradelphic (2012)
- The Prodigy – "The Day Is My Enemy" from The Day Is My Enemy (2015)
- Tricky – "When We Die" (2016)
