= Fear of intimacy =

Phobia of close interpersonal relationships

Fear of intimacy is generally a social phobia and anxiety disorder resulting in difficulty forming close relationships with another person. The term can also refer to a scale on a psychometric test, or a type of adult in attachment theory psychology.

The fear of intimacy is the fear of being emotionally or physically close to another individual. This fear is also defined as "the inhibited capacity of an individual, because of anxiety, to exchange thought and feelings of personal significance with another individual who is highly valued". Fear of intimacy is the expression of existential views in that to love and to be loved makes life seem precious and death more inevitable. It can result from any number of dysfunctional bonding experiences ranging from early childhood parental attachments to relationship failures in adulthood.

== Symptoms ==
People with this fear are anxious about or afraid of intimate relationships. They believe that they do not deserve love or support from others. Fear of intimacy has three defining features:

- content, the ability to communicate personal information,
- emotional valence, the feelings about personal information exchanged, and
- vulnerability, their regard for the person they are intimate with.

Bartholomew and Horowitz go further and determine four different adult attachment types: "(1) Secure individuals have a sense of worthiness or lovability and are comfortable with intimacy and autonomy; (2) preoccupied persons lack this sense of self-worthiness yet view others positively and seek their love and acceptance; (3) fearful people lack a sense of lovability and are avoidant of others in anticipation of rejection; (4) dismissing persons feel worthy of love yet detach from others whom they generally regard as untrustworthy".

== Fear of Intimacy Scale ==
The Fear of Intimacy Scale (FIS) is a 35-item self-evaluation that can determine the level of fear of intimacy that an individual has. This test can determine this level even if the individual is not in a relationship. It was found by Doi and Thelen that FIS correlated positively with confidence in the dependability of others and fear of abandonment while correlating negatively with comfort and closeness. A high score represents a high level of fear of intimacy.

== Among women ==
A study conducted by Reis and Grenyer found that women with depression have much higher levels of fear of intimacy. Another study found that fear of intimacy among women might be strongly associated with actual intimacy instead of desired intimacy. This study also found that the level of the woman's fear of intimacy is a good indicator of the longevity of a couple's relationship.

Another study determined that women who fear intimacy generally perceive less intimacy in their dating relationships even if their partner does not have this fear. This study also found that fear of intimacy in women plays a key role in the intimacy of the relationship and in the relationship's likelihood of survival.

Also, it was determined that "[fe]males who were taught not to trust strangers consistently experienced greater fear of intimacy and more loneliness than did those who were not trained to distrust strangers".

== Among sexual abuse survivors ==
=== Among abused women ===
Mark H. Thelen, Michelle D. Sherman and Tiffany S. Borst conducted a study in 1998 "to determine if rape survivors have difficulties with attachment and fear of intimacy". In the study, they used the FIS and other methods to compare rape survivors with other non-abused controls. When trait anxiety was ruled out, it was found that there was "no significant differences on fear of intimacy, confidence in others' dependability, and comfort with closeness".

The results of this study showed that "Confidence in others' dependability and comfort with closeness were negatively correlated with the FIS whereas fear of abandonment was not correlated with the FIS. …The attachment dimensions and the FIS were significantly correlated in the predicted direction with trait anxiety".

The results of this study showed that "the rape survivors differed from the controls in reporting higher fear of intimacy… suggesting that the experience of rape is related to women's discomfort in close relationships". It was also found that "those who disclosed the rape did not differ significantly from those who did not disclose on fear of intimacy or the attachment measures, although the differences were in the predicted direction".

Another study found that "abused women exhibited significantly higher levels of externalized self-sacrifice, silence, and disconnection intimate relationships when compared to nonabused women". They also found that the challenge of trying to help these women "are magnified when working with battered women because of the betrayal of trust they have experienced within interpersonal relationships".

=== Among childhood sexual abuse victims ===
"CSA patients have... an extreme fear of allowing others to see them as they truly are". They have a high "fear of being revictimized as a consequence of being trusting and open to someone in authority". Because of their experience, "intimacy feels...very frightening to most CSA survivors... To feel close to another again is to remember that this position is a dangerous one, one that might lead to being taken advantage of".

== Among child molesters and abusers ==
Current studies show that people who have an insufficient amount of intimacy or are lonely are more vulnerable to exhibit sexually offending behaviors. One recent study determined that child molesters exhibited significantly higher levels of fear of intimacy than rapists, nonsexually abusing inmates, and a control group of law-abiding citizens.

It was also found that "men with attachment anxiety would have a different goal in a conflict: to stay connected, which may temper the use of severe violence but not mild violence and psychological abuse".

== Intimacy anxiety disorder ==
Intimacy anxiety disorder is a specific type of anxiety disorder characterized by an intense anxiety or fear in one or more intimate (sexual) or partner-social interactions, causing considerable distress and impaired ability to function in at least some parts of daily life. Examples of sexual interaction are kissing, sexual touching, and sexual intercourse. The cognitions behind the intense anxiety include fears of being incompetent, of making mistakes, of being judged on how they carry out sexual interactions, causing harm, or being harmed during sexual interaction.

Examples of partner-social interactions are talking to a romantic interest, asking/going on a dinner date, hugging, holding hands, and kissing. The cognition behind the anxiety is about being afraid of making mistakes, being incompetent, failing, or being judged on how they carry out partner-social interactions.

In order to meet the criteria for intimacy anxiety disorder, either high anxiety in partner-social interactions and/or high anxiety in sexual interactions are present.
