= Quixotic (album) =

Studio album by Martina Topley-Bird
- Released: 14 July 2003
- Genre: Trip hop; electronica; indie rock; soul
- Length: 51:11
- Label: Independiente
- Producer: Martina Topley-Bird; Amp 9 (Nick Bird, Steve Crittall, Alex McGowan); David Holmes; Tricky

Martina Topley-Bird chronology
Quixotic (2003)	The Blue God (2008)

Singles from Quixotic
- 1. "Need One" Released: 2 June 2003; 2. "Anything" Released: 1 September 2003; 3. "I Still Feel (promo)" 4. "Soul Food"

Alternative cover
- Anything cover art

Quixotic
Review scores
Source	Rating
Allmusic	4/5 stars
entertainment.ie	4/5 stars
The Guardian	2/5 stars
Hot Press	4.5/5 stars
The Independent	4/5 stars
Muzik	3/5 stars
Pitchfork Media	5.9/10
The Times	3/5 stars
Uncut	2/5 stars

Anything
Review scores
Source	Rating
AllMusic	3.5/5 stars
Robert Christgau	(2-star Honorable Mention)
Rolling Stone	3.5/5 stars
Tiny Mix Tapes	4/5

Quixotic is the debut studio album by English singer-songwriter Martina Topley-Bird. The album spans several musical styles including trip hop, electronica and rock. It was co-written and produced by Topley-Bird and received positive reviews from music critics upon its release and was shortlisted for the 2003 Mercury Music Prize. Quixotic also includes a collaboration with musician Tricky, with whom Topley-Bird collaborated prior to her solo work.

Quixotic was released in the United States one year later, in 2004. Licensed to the Palm Pictures label, the album was retitled Anything and the track list was altered – including the omission of three tracks originally found on Quixotic. Additionally, the song mixes differ, and the "Intro" track was moved to the end of the album, retitled "Outro".

== Track listing ==
=== Quixotic ===
No.	Title	Writer(s)	Length
1.	"Intro"	Topley-Bird	1:11
2.	"Need One"	Topley-Bird; Amp 9	3:55
3.	"Anything"	Nick Bird; Steve Crittall	4:25
4.	"Soul Food"	Topley-Bird; Amp 9	5:32
5.	"Lullaby"	Topley-Bird; Amp 9	4:23
6.	"Too Tough to Die"	Topley-Bird; Holmes	3:58
7.	"Sandpaper Kisses"	Topley-Bird; Amp 9	3:52
8.	"Ragga"	Topley-Bird; Tricky	3:15
9.	"Lying"	Topley-Bird	4:14
10.	"I Wanna Be There"	Topley-Bird; Amp 9	1:54
11.	"I Still Feel"	Topley-Bird; Amp 9	5:21
12.	"Ilya"	Topley-Bird	4:38
13.	"Stevie's (Day's of a Gun)"	Topley-Bird; Amp 9	4:32

French edition bonus tracks
No.	Title	Length
14.	"Skyscraper"	4:28
15.	"I Wanna Be There" (live at Bush Hall)	2:05
16.	"Too Tough to Die" (Hot to Tape remix)	4:16

=== Anything ===
1. "Anything"
2. "Ragga"
3. "Need One"
4. "Soul Food"
5. "Ilya"
6. "I Still Feel"
7. "Sandpaper Kisses"
8. "Too Tough to Die"
9. "Lullaby"
10. "Outro"

== Guest appearances ==
- Mark Lanegan performs additional vocals and Josh Homme plays additional guitar on "Need One"
- David Holmes co-wrote and produced "Too Tough to Die" and mixed "I Wanna Be There"
- Tricky produced, co-wrote music/lyrics and his vocals are featured on "Ragga". He also did some producing and additional programming on a few more tracks.
- David Arnold co-produced and arranged strings on "Stevie's (Day's of a Gun)"
- Cath Coffey performed backing vocals on some of the tracks

== Singles ==
- "Need One"
- "Anything"
- "I Still Feel"
- "Soul Food"

== Charts ==
Chart (2003)	Peak position
UK Albums Chart	70
French Albums Chart	58

== Appearances in media ==
- "Lullaby" was used in the campaign for juice powder Clight (in Brazil), and later used in advertisements for Kenzo's fragrance Flower.
- "Sandpaper Kisses" is featured on the soundtrack of the video game Fahrenheit (known as Indigo Prophecy in North America).
- "Need One" appears on the CSI: Miami soundtrack, released in 2004); the song was used in the episode "Blood Brothers".
- "I Only Have Eyes for You" and "Soulfood" (Charles Webster's Banging House Dub) were featured on The O.C..
- Samples of "Sandpaper Kisses" are prominently featured in Stephen Marley's "You're Gonna Leave" from his 2007 release Mind Control. It is also featured in Canadian artist the Weeknd's second 2011 mixtape, Thursday, on "The Birds Part 2".
- "Too Tough to Die" was used as the opening theme song of the Thandie Newton series Rogue during its first season.
