= Quaye =

Surname

Quaye is a common Ghanaian surname. Notable people with the surname include:

- Abdullah Quaye (born 1980), Ghanaian football midfielder
- Benjamin W. Quartey Quaye Papafio (1859–1924), physician and politician in the Gold Coast
- Caleb Quaye (born 1948), English Afro-European rock guitarist and studio musician
- Daniel Quaye (born 1980), Ghanaian football defender
- Finley Quaye (born 1974), Scottish musician
- Ko Quaye (born 1987), Canadian football defensive tackle
- Lawrence Quaye (born 1984), Ghana born naturalized Qatari footballer
- Paul Quaye (born 1995), Spanish-born Ghanaian footballer
- Peter Ofori-Quaye (born 1980), Ghanaian professional association football player
- Philemon Quaye (1924–2010), Ghanaian soldier, politician, diplomat and religious leader
- Raphael M. Quaye (born 1975), Liberian basketball player
- Shamo Quaye (1971–1997), Ghanaian footballer
- Terri Quaye (born 1940), English singer, pianist, and percussionist
