= Iradelphic =

Studio album by Clark
- Released: 2 April 2012
- Genre: Electronica; folktronica; IDM; ambient
- Length: 39:53
- Label: Warp Records
- Producer: Clark

Clark chronology
Totems Flare (2009)	Iradelphic (2012)	Feast / Beast (2013)

Iradelphic is the sixth studio album by British electronic musician Clark, released on 2 April 2012 on Warp Records. It marked a stylistic departure from his earlier work, incorporating acoustic guitar, piano and vocal collaborations with Martina Topley-Bird. The album was recorded across a range of locations, including sessions in Australia, London and Wales. Iradelphic received mixed-to-positive reviews, with an aggregate score of 67 out of 100 on Metacritic.

== Background and recording ==
Iradelphic was Clark's first album in three years, following Totems Flare (2009). The recording sessions were geographically dispersed, with Clark describing the process as "a month or so here, a month or so there, each studio with a different set up and varying amounts of equipment". Sessions took place in locations including Australia, London and Wales, as well as at Snape Maltings in Suffolk, where Clark used a vintage Telefunken microphone to record orchestral drums. Vocal sessions with Martina Topley-Bird were recorded at Hot Chip's studio. At the time, Clark was based in Berlin, where he maintained a studio he described as "sparse".

Clark learned and played acoustic guitar for the album, marking a shift from the aggressive electronic approach of his earlier releases. He described his production method as not purely electronic, stating: "I don't use purely 'electronic' tools. I don't see myself as an electronic musician, even." He employed a range of processing techniques, including valve amplifiers, guitar pedals and plate reverbs, to blur the boundaries between acoustic and electronic sounds. Many tracks went through extensive iteration, with Clark noting that most had approximately 30 versions before the final cut.

Topley-Bird contributed vocals to several tracks, including "Open", "Secret" and "The Pining Pt. 2". Clark explained his approach to the collaboration: "I've wanted to get Martina on a track for a while now, but really wanted a proper hook/melody and set of lyrics for her to sing, rather than doing that cliché producer thing of going 'sexy female vocals chopped up over fat masculine beats'."

Ahead of the album's release, Clark held a live-streamed "Iradelphic Workshop" from his Berlin studio on 22 March 2012, performing with synthesizers and modular equipment. The album was launched with a performance at Village Underground in London on 7 April 2012.

== Music ==
Iradelphic represented a notable departure from Clark's previous releases. The album opens with "Henderson Wrench", built around fingerpicked guitar rather than the distorted electronics of Totems Flare. Clark described the album as playing "as one long track, more than anything I've ever done, really", with recurring musical themes throughout.

The album blends acoustic and electronic instrumentation across its twelve tracks. "Com Touch" features modular synthesizer work and what Clark described as a Prince-inspired snare drum sound. "Tooth Moves" was built from a guitar jam processed through eight layers of guitar pedals. "Black Stone" is a solo piano piece, completed in approximately thirty minutes at Snape Maltings. The album's final section is dominated by "The Pining", a three-part suite spanning over ten minutes that moves between electronic production, live instruments and Topley-Bird's vocals. The closing track, "Broken Kite Footage", features guitar layers processed through valve amplifiers with pitchshifters and plate reverbs.

Clark cited Sun Ra, early drum and bass from the No U-Turn label, and M83 as influences during the album's creation.

== Critical reception ==
Professional ratings
Aggregate scores
Source	Rating
Metacritic	67/100
Review scores
Source	Rating
BBC Music	7/10
Clash	8/10
Consequence of Sound	C+
NME	6/10
Pitchfork	5.8/10
PopMatters	7/10
XLR8R	Positive
Headphone Commute	Positive

Iradelphic received mixed-to-positive reviews from music critics. On Metacritic, the album holds an aggregate score of 67 out of 100, based on professional reviews. The Quietus described it as "less ethereal, more compact and cohesive" than Clark's earlier work. Clash gave the album 8 out of 10, noting Clark remained "self-assured in its odd-ball-ness" while exploring new territory. XLR8R described it as "an electro-acoustic jazz-fusion record", while Consequence of Sound called it "deceptively ambitious" and potentially "one of the most interesting releases this year". Beats Per Minute highlighted Clark's "graceful abandon and willingness to explore an unprecedentedly wide palette of instruments and moods", awarding 82 per cent.

== Track listing ==
No.	Title	Length
1.	"Henderson Wrench"	2:23
2.	"Com Touch"	4:24
3.	"Tooth Moves"	3:19
4.	"Skyward Bruise/Descent"	2:00
5.	"Open"	3:19
6.	"Secret"	3:44
7.	"Ghosted"	3:39
8.	"Black Stone"	2:03
9.	"The Pining pt1"	4:21
10.	"The Pining pt2"	3:11
11.	"The Pining pt3"	2:42
12.	"Broken Kite Footage"	4:54

Japanese bonus track
No.	Title	Length
13.	"Lysergic Planes"	3:06
