= Bib10 =

Studio album by Bibio
- Released: 21 October 2022
- Genre: Electronic; indie folk; funk
- Length: 45:35
- Label: Warp
- Producer: Bibio

Bibio chronology
| Sleep on the Wing (2020) | Bib10 (2022) |

Bib10 (stylized as BIB10 in all caps) is the tenth studio album by English producer Bibio, also known as Stephen Wilkinson, released on 21 October 2022.

== Background and recording ==
In a 2020 interview with Stereogum, Bibio announced that he was working on new material that, in contrast with previous releases Ribbons and Sleep on the Wing, "right now, I'm making synthpop and disco, amongst other things. What I'm working on now is more like A Mineral Love, but it's early days still, so all of that could change." According to Bibio, "I wanted this album to sound more polished and slick. But not 'software perfect'. My influences for studio production mostly come from the 60s, 70s, and 80s where the craft was very different – getting a more polished sound, without ironing the humanity out of it, was part of the ethos." Bibio has called the album a reaction to the mostly acoustic Ribbons, saying that he wanted to start playing more electric guitar in order to do something different. "S.O.L." and "Fools" feature the vocals of Oliver St. Louis, who previously collaborated with Bibio on the song "Why So Serious" from A Mineral Love.

== Release and reception ==
On 2 September 2022, a teaser video titled "十" was posted to Bibio's YouTube account featuring a spinning gold vinyl record with the number "10" set to the first 13 seconds of "Off Goes The Light". On 8 September, the full video for "Off Goes The Light" was released, and it was announced that Bib10 would be released on Warp Records on 21 October. The title is a reference to the fact that it is Bibio's tenth studio album. On 10 October, a video was released for the second single "Potion". On the day of the album's release, a video for the song "S.O.L" was released on Bibio's YouTube channel.

Allmusic called Bib10 "an immensely satisfying listening experience -- and an exquisitely crafted celebration of the beauty and possibilities within Wilkinson's music."

On Jul 26, 2023, Bibio announced on his personal YouTube channel that he would be releasing a follow-up EP, stating, "Since the release of Ambivalence Avenue in 2009, I've followed up every one of my albums with at least 1 EP. Each of my albums feels like a distinct chapter in my life, and the EPs are a way of expanding a chapter before I move on to something entirely different. An EP is, therefore, a sort of satellite release to an album, and allows me to explore more ideas and variations within each chapter. Sunbursting EP is, therefore, part of the same world as BIB10, yet explores some new ideas and includes some new instruments and sounds." The EP, Sunbursting EP, was released on September 22 via his record label, Warp.

== Track listing ==
All tracks written, recorded, and produced by Stephen Wilkinson.

| No. | Title | Length |
|---|---|---|
| 1. | "Off Goes The Light" | 4:33 |
| 2. | "Potion" | 4:08 |
| 3. | "Sharratt" | 3:51 |
| 4. | "Rain and Shine" | 4:13 |
| 5. | "S.O.L" | 5:51 |
| 6. | "Cinnamon Cinematic" | 4:33 |
| 7. | "Even More Excuses" | 4:13 |
| 8. | "A Sanctimonious Song" | 3:09 |
| 9. | "Lost Somewhere" | 4:36 |
| 10. | "Phonograph" | 2:41 |
| 11. | "Fools" | 3:47 |
| Total length: | | 45:35 |
