= Silver Wilkinson =

Studio album by Bibio
- Released: 14 May 2013
- Genre: Experimental, indie pop, electronic, psychedelic folk
- Length: 48:54
- Label: Warp Records

Bibio chronology
Mind Bokeh (2011)	Silver Wilkinson (2013)	The Green EP (2014)

Professional ratings
Aggregate scores
Source	Rating
Metacritic	72/100
Review scores
Source	Rating
AllMusic	4/5 stars
Clash	7/10
Drowned in Sound	8/10
Pitchfork	6.2/10
Slant Magazine	3/5 stars

Silver Wilkinson is a studio album by British electronic musician Bibio. It was released via Warp Records on 14 May 2013.

"Silver Wilkinson" comes from the name of a salmon fishing fly, which the artist's girlfriend showed him. It was originally supposed to be a track title, but he decided to use it for the album's name. Bibio is another type of fishing fly, while the artist's name is Stephen Wilkinson. This gives "Silver Wilkinson" the impression of being a self-titled album.

On 4 April, a video of samples from the album was released by Warp Records.

== Production ==
According to Bibio, the album "started out with the desire for a new 'season', contrasting somewhat with the previous." While he felt that it was as eclectic as Ambivalence Avenue and Mind Bokeh, he wanted "to focus more on an organic and live sound and to record more guitar and other live instrumentation." While most of the album was recorded and produced in his home studio, he did use "a 12 string guitar, an MPC sampler, a microphone and a cassette recorder" to record some material in his garden on sunny days. Lead single "À tout à l'heure" and his personal favorite "Dye the Water Green" were two of the songs that he spent a significant amount of time recording outside.

A follow-up was announced in December 2013, titled The Green EP. The EP contains 5 archive tracks chosen to complement the song "Dye The Water Green", including the track "Dinghy" which was recorded with Richard Roberts of Letherette in 2006.

== Critical reception ==
At Metacritic, which assigns a weighted average score out of 100 to reviews from mainstream critics, the film received an average score of 72% based on 20 reviews, indicating "generally favorable reviews".

== Track listing ==
No.	Title	Length
1.	"The First Daffodils"	2:59
2.	"Dye the Water Green"	5:25
3.	"Wulf"	2:09
4.	"Mirroring All"	5:38
5.	"À tout à l'heure"	4:09
6.	"Sycamore Silhouetting"	3:16
7.	"You"	5:29
8.	"Raincoat"	4:08
9.	"Look at Orion!"	7:38
10.	"Business Park"	4:59
11.	"You Won't Remember..."	3:04
12.	"But I Wanted You" (Japanese bonus track)	2:07

== Charts ==
Chart	Peak position
US Top Dance/Electronic Albums (Billboard)	17
US Heatseekers Albums (Billboard)	17
