= The Green EP (Bibio EP) =

The Green E.P.

EP by Bibio
- Released: 27 January 2014
- Genre: Experimental; indie pop; electronic; folk
- Length: 25:54
- Label: Warp

Bibio chronology
Silver Wilkinson (2013)	The Green E.P. (2014)	A Mineral Love (2016)

Professional ratings
Review scores
Source	Rating
Consequence of Sound	C+

The Green E.P. is the follow-up to Bibio's sixth studio album, Silver Wilkinson; it was announced on 3 December 2013, and was released on 27 January 2014.

The EP features archive music chosen to complement the track 'Dye The Water Green', taken from the album Silver Wilkinson. 'Dinghy' was recorded in 2006 by Bibio and Richard Roberts of Letherette, 'Carbon Wulf' is an improvised ambient version of 'Wulf' performed on baritone guitar, and 'The Spinney View of Hinkley Point' was the first Bibio song to feature live drums.

== Track listing ==
All tracks are written by Stephen Wilkinson.

No.	Title	Length
1.	"Dye the Water Green"	5:24
2.	"Dinghy"	2:39
3.	"Down to the Sound"	2:35
4.	"Carbon Wulf"	3:05
5.	"A Thousand Syllables"	5:40
6.	"The Spinney View of Hinkley Point"	6:31
Total length:		25:54

Japanese bonus track
No.	Title	Length
7.	"Vera"	2:30
Total length:		28:24
