= Letherette (album) =

Studio album by Letherette
- Released: 15 April 2013
- Genre: Electronic, Hip hop, House
- Length: 56:46
- Label: Ninja Tune
- Producer: Letherette

Letherette is the first studio album by English producers Letherette. It was released on 15 April 2013 by Ninja Tune.

== Reception ==
Professional ratings
Review scores
| Source | Rating |
|---|---|
| AllMusic | 4/5 stars |
| The 405 | 8/10 stars |
| Drowned In Sound | 7/10 stars |
| MusicOMH | 3.5/5 stars |
| The Skinny | 4/5 stars |
| Ear Milk | 7/10 stars |

The album received generally positive reviews. The 405 gave it a score of 8/10 and Drowned In Sound gave it a score of 7/10. Popmatters listed the album at number 9 in its 2013 'Best of Electronic Music' end of year poll.

== Track listing ==
| No. | Title | Length |
|---|---|---|
| 1. | "After Dawn" | 4:31 |
| 2. | "D&T" | 3:16 |
| 3. | "Restless" | 4:07 |
| 4. | "I Always Wanted You Back" | 3:18 |
| 5. | "The One" | 4:46 |
| 6. | "Gas Stations & Restaurants" | 5:55 |
| 7. | "Cold Clam" | 5:49 |
| 8. | "Warstones" | 4:35 |
| 9. | "Boosted" | 4:35 |
| 10. | "Space Cuts" | 4:05 |
| 11. | "Hard Martha" | 5:24 |
| 12. | "Say The Sun" | 6:22 |

iTunes bonus track
| No. | Title | Length |
|---|---|---|
| 13. | "Film Music" | 3:44 |

== Personnel ==
- Richard Robert – Producer, Writer
- Andrew Harber – Producer, Writer
- Jed and Lucia – Vocals
- Natasha Kmeto – Vocals
- Bed Modley – Electric Guitar
- Naweed Ahmed – Mastering
- Stephen Wilkinson – Photography
- Letherette – Artwork
