= Bibio =

English musician and producer (born 1978)

- Also known as: Duckula; Champagne Eagle; 81810
- Born: Stephen James Wilkinson; 4 December 1978 (age 47)
- Origin: West Midlands, England
- Genres: Folktronica, indie pop, indie rock, ambient
- Occupations: Singer; producer
- Instruments: Guitar; bass guitar; singing; synthesizer; sampler; computers; alto saxophone
- Years active: 2005–present
- Labels: Warp; Mush
- Website: bibio.co

Stephen James Wilkinson (born 4 December 1978), known by his stage name Bibio, is an English musician and producer. He is known for his distinct analog lo-fi sound, and for working in a diverse range of genres, beginning in folktronica and ambient and later stretching to include instrumental hip hop, indie pop, electronica, soul, funk, and alternative R&B.

He currently releases music on Warp Records, and previously released on Mush Records.

== Biography and career ==
=== Beginnings at Mush Records (1999–2009) ===
A resident of Wolverhampton in the West Midlands, England, Wilkinson developed a passion for experimental music during his time at Middlesex University in London from 1999 to 2003, where he studied "sonic arts". His earliest songs were mainly layered guitar compositions inspired by Steve Reich's Electric Counterpoint, one of his earliest being "Cantaloup Carousel", which was originally recorded in 1999 at his university residence. His recording equipment at the time consisted of a "plastic" microphone, a budget sampler, cassette deck, and a portable MiniDisc recorder.

Listening to music on Warp Records in 2000 led him to experiment with programming virtual synthesizers in SuperCollider, which he was introduced to via his university classes. His discovery of Nick Drake and The Incredible String Band in 2001 also encouraged him to try fingerpicking and alternative guitar tunings, which "opened up new avenues of melodic expression and serendipity" and "made playing guitar feel fresh and exciting again". Wilkinson credits these "happy days of discovery" at university with helping develop his signature lo-fi sound.

Upon graduating, Wilkinson left London and returned to Wolverhampton, setting up a recording space in the spare bedroom of his girlfriend's parents' house. He worked part time while recording music, and was briefly a lecturer at Stafford College teaching Music Technology. After sharing his collection of recordings with Marcus Eoin of Boards of Canada, Eoin recommended Bibio to American indie label Mush Records, who signed Wilkinson in 2004. He adopted the name "Bibio" from the name of a black-and-red artificial fly his father used on fly-fishing trips for trout in Wales.

Wilkinson's university recordings from 1999 to 2003 formed the basis of his debut album fi, released in February 2005. Sophomore album Hand Cranked was released March 2006, and continued in a similar style, seeking to emulate the sound of mechanical music boxes using antique instruments. His third full-length album Vignetting the Compost, released February 2009, carried on with his signature sound while progressing towards more traditional folk song structures. Digital only EP Ovals and Emeralds followed in March 2009 and explored circus music and the sounds of fairground organs.

Bibio's output on Mush Records mostly consisted of instrumental guitar compositions, centered around the use of looped melodies, ambient field recordings, found sounds, tape distortion and manipulation, additional folk instruments, and gentle synth drones. Only occasional songs featured vocals ("Mr. and Mrs. Compost", "Great Are The Piths", "Abberiw", and "Flesh Rots, Pips Sown"). Bibio occasionally worked with Letherette during this time, after Wilkinson met Richard Roberts working at the same pub as him. Roberts co-wrote and co-produced several Bibio songs, the pair began a short lived music project named SK Dreams, and the three along with Matt Cutler started a record label named Artists' Valley, which released a limited 7-inch Bibio single "Shelia Sets Sail" in 2005.

=== Warp and Ambivalence Avenue (2007–2009) ===
While continuing to record lo-fi guitar pieces, Wilkinson was inspired by artists like J Dilla, MF Doom, and Madlib to begin a short-lived hip hop side project named Duckula. Listening to Daft Punk and Warp Records artists also inspired him to create 90s french house and electronica tracks, and Brazilian guitarists like Marcos Valle and João Gilberto deeply influenced his guitar playing and led him to write funk, soul, and samba inspired pieces. After a period of trying to separate his various styles into different side projects, Wilkinson was encouraged by his friends to de-compartmentalize and merge his interests under the Bibio name.

In 2007, he recorded the song "Ambivalence Avenue", which he now regards as a milestone in his career – "it combined the lofi tapey Bibio guitar sound with weightier beat based production, fingerpicking with jazz chords, it had a Brazilian influence, a folk influence and a hip hop influence, it was a realization of an idea in my head trying to come out, it was a combination I had been striving for a while. Making this track gave me a new confidence and triggered what became the most prolific period of my life so far." The song caught the attention of Steve Beckett of Warp Records, who encouraged him to keep recording in this style. Wilkinson "knuckled down" and recorded the tracks that would make up Ambivalence Avenue between 2007 and 2008. On the strength of these recordings Bibio signed to Warp Records in August 2008.

Ambivalence Avenue was released in June 2009, four months after Ovals and Emeralds, and marked the start of a new sound and era, embracing vocals, hip-hop beats, folk and pop song structures, and funk/soul guitars. Wilkinson regarded it as "another debut album" and recalled recording the album during "difficult years, having a degree that meant nothing to the world around me... being in my mid 20s and not knowing where I was heading in life in a town with little opportunity," and was uncertain whether people would enjoy its variety. Ambivalence Avenue was met with largely favorable reviews, with Tiny Mix Tapes describing it as his "most creative and penetrating release yet" and Pitchfork ranking it as the 33rd best album of 2009, stating "it's shocking how utterly and successfully he rewrites his playbook." Some reviewers were more critical, with Drowned in Sound claiming "Bibio's tendency... to either smooth the edges of his creations into non-threatening abstraction or fail to zone in on his best ideas is frustrating."

Companion release The Apple and the Tooth followed shortly after in November 2009, his fourth major release of the year, featuring four new songs and eight remixes of tracks from Ambivalence Avenue. The original tracks were described as "expert, full of electronic papier-mache layers of arpeggiated guitars, glitchy drum patterns and joyful percussive samples," by The Guardian. In some publications, it is referred to as Bibio's fifth album due to its length.

=== Mind Bokeh and Silver Wilkinson (2011–2014) ===
Genres are the menu and music is the food, and I prefer to eat food and not the menu.

— Stephen Wilkinson, interview with Dazed, 5 August 2011

Bibio's next studio album, Mind Bokeh, was released on 29 March 2011 in the US and 4 April in the UK, promoted by the single "Excuses" in February 2011. It continued the sound of Ambivalence Avenue with more mixing of genres, including forays into power pop on "Take Off Your Shirt" and microhouse on "Saint Christopher". Wilkinson described the album as having a "balance of the familiar and the non-familiar." Mind Bokeh was met with mixed reviews. Clash ranked Mind Bokeh the 24th best album of 2011, and Slant praised the album for being "fluid and formless, committing to pop structure and melodies one moment only to eschew them the next, often all within the same track", while Tiny Mix Tapes called the album "an ugly stepchild of a record, neither diverting enough to work as pop nor novel enough to satisfy as pure electronic music," and XLR8R felt the LP had "a less than desirable success rate".

Mind Bokeh was followed by two accompanying EPs, K Is for Kelson in May 2011 and T.O.Y.S. in August 2011, which featured alternate versions of "K Is for Kelson" and "Take Off Your Shirt" respectively alongside new music.

Bibio's sixth record Silver Wilkinson, named after a fishing fly found in a charity shop, was recorded shortly after Mind Bokeh and was released 13 May 2013. Wilkinson took lyrical inspiration from films and daydreams and sought a "cinematic, panoramic and lush" sound for the record, while electing to "pick up the guitar more and focus on a more melancholy live sound". "Sycamore Silhouetting" dates back to 2007–2008 and existed in "many different versions" before being finished for Silver Wilkinson, and "You" began as part of the side projects which led to Ambivalence Avenue. Significant parts of lead single "À tout à l'heure" and "Dye the Water Green" were recorded outdoors in Wilkinson's garden. Wilkinson described the album as his "most melancholy perhaps as a whole". The album was met with mostly positive reviews, with AllMusic praising the album as "a scenic route through Bibio's music that showcases its depth as well as its breadth."

Silver Wilkinson was followed by The Green EP, released in January 2014, which features archive tracks chosen to compliment the trac "Dye the Water Green", Wilkinson's personal favorite song from the album.

Bibio next contributed "Dye the Water Green" and six original songs to the 2014 film Men, Women & Children, directed by Jason Reitman. Wilkinson spent a day with Reitman playing unreleased tracks over film footage, and described the experience as "very perfect, like dream come true stuff". Four of the six original songs appear on the film's soundtrack album.

In 2015, Warp Records reissued fi for its 10th anniversary, adding an uncut version of the album closer "Poplar Avenue".

=== A Mineral Love and Phantom Brickworks (2016–2018) ===
Released 1 April 2016, Bibio's seventh studio album A Mineral Love featured collaborations with Gotye, Oliver St. Louis, and Wax Stag, and diverged from his previous work by featuring a sound prominently influenced by 70s and 80s music, as well as R&B, later described by PopMatters as a "joyous yacht-psych fever dream".

Wilkinson began the sessions for A Mineral Love in February 2015 by building a sound-proof home studio, which he credits with helping take the album away from the "bedroom producer approach" of his earlier records, and cited Sly and the Family Stone, Stevie Wonder, Joni Mitchell, Steely Dan, Prince and B. B. & Q. Band as influences on the album. Wilkinson had been friends with Wax Stag from early on in his career, while his collaboration with Gotye happened entirely over email, the pair never met. Bibio was introduced to Olivier St.Louis through his feature on Hudson Mohawke's song "Butter" and bonded with him quickly over "guitars, brogues and watches". Their collaboration led to further meetings, and in September 2017 the follow-up The Serious EP was released, featuring three more songs written by the pair.

Another followup EP Beyond Serious was released on 12" and digital on 5 May 2017. Wilkinson had always wanted to release "an EP or something of just house tracks". Inspired by a recent purchase of a Roland TR-808, Wilkinson recorded four tracks using nothing but the machine and a ring modulator, then developed the songs further with synths and manipulated vocals from the recently recorded The Serious EP.

Phantom Brickworks was released 3 November 2017, preceded by the single "Capel Celyn" on 27 October 2017. In a further divergence from his work over the last decade, the album is entirely ambient, made from a set of improvised compositions consisting of processed piano, synth, and guitar loops surrounded by tape hiss and field recordings. Recorded over ten years, Wilkinson produced the LP based on the concept that "places can be haunted by meaning," reasoning that "human beings are highly sensitive to the atmospheres of places, which can be enhanced or dramatically altered when you learn about the context of their history." Most of the song titles are references to abandoned places in the United Kingdom, such as Capel Celyn, a community in Gwynedd, Wales that was intentionally flooded to create a reservoir in 1965, and "Capel Bethania", a song named after a chapel demolished in 1991.

The album was well received by reviewers, who called it Bibio's most accomplished record. It landed at number 11 on Time Out New York's list of the best albums of 2017. The Line of Best Fit claimed "Bibio has not only created a record that stands apart from his other Warp albums to date, but has cemented his mastery of the atmospheric."

The followup EP Phantom Brickworks (IV & V), featuring two additional tracks from the Phantom Brickworks sessions, was released on 12" and digital on 9 November 2018, along with a limited edition release photo book. The tracks were described as "the ideal bookend to Bibio's project".

=== Ribbons and Bib10 (2019–2023) ===
Bibio's ninth studio album Ribbons was released on 12 April 2019. The album marks a return to the lo-fi guitar oriented roots of his earlier career, such as on 2009's Vignetting the Compost, while retaining some of the funk and soul influences featured prominently on A Mineral Love. The album was well received by critics, accumulating an overall score of 81 out of 100 on Metacritic, indicating "universal acclaim". Canadian music publication Exclaim! stated, "With Ribbons, it is clear that Bibio is trying to take the best parts of his music over the years and bring them together into one concise, but eclectic, album, and on more than a few moments, he succeeds beautifully."

Ten track EP Sleep on the Wing was released June 12, 2020, and was an extension of the guitar oriented lo-fi side of Ribbons, featuring a variety of traditional string instruments and folk inspired songwriting. AllMusic called it "quintessentially Bibio, and spending more time with it is a joy."

In 2020, Warp Records obtained the rights to Bibio's recordings for Mush Records, and began reissuing Hand Cranked, Vignetting the Compost, and Ovals and Emeralds on vinyl and digital. Hand Cranked was reissued digitally with five bonus tracks, including the original recording of "Cantaloup Carousel" from 1999.

On 8 September 2022, Bibio announced his tenth studio album Bib10, to be released 21 October 2022, calling it "more of a party album" and "an ode to guitar in a very different way." The album continued to combine styles from across his career, and received mostly positive reviews, hailed as "a delight of vintage guitars and old school production techniques" while another reviewer described the album as "burrowing down a not as interesting rabbit hole to search for his groove-based side." There were two follow-up releases in 2023 — the S.O.L. EP presented reworkings of the title track from Alan Braxe and Bibio himself (as Champaign Eagle and 81810), and the Sunbursting EP featured seven new songs, including a collaboration with Icelandic saxophonist Óskar Guðjónsson.

In August 2024, a 15th anniversary edition of Ambivalence Avenue was released with three bonus tracks, including "The Art of Dying", "West Park", and an extended version of "All the Flowers", all of which were recorded in 2009.

=== Phantom Brickworks (LP II) and current work (2024–present) ===
In November 2024, Bibio released his eleventh album, Phantom Brickworks (LP II), alongside a limited photobook, a continuation of his study of abandoned locations across the Welsh countryside by way of ambient songwriting and photography. In an interview on the album with Inverted Audio, Wilkinson shared explicitly that "to make a Phantom Brickworks album is more like photography. You go out and shoot a roll of film and there might be one really good photo if you’re lucky. So it takes time to build up a collection of those special takes to make an album."

== Live ==
Bibio rarely performs live in front of an audience, preferring to share studio sessions recorded at home. He embarked on a DJ tour through 2009 and 2010 in support of Ambivalence Avenue, and continues to DJ live on occasion. He most notably toured a live solo electronic show in 2011, working with MIDI controllers and a laptop remixing songs from Ambivalence Avenue and Mind Bokeh, as well as a one-off show in 2017 in Japan where he performed with a TR-808, TB-303, and laptop in the style of his Beyond Serious EP.

Although he discussed putting a live band together in 2011, no such band materialized, except for a small band of friends for the Silver Wilkinson studio sessions. He confessed in 2016, "I said that... because it was expected of me, that forming a band was a logical step to make. In honesty, it's not something I want to do," and later explained "I like to perform alone in my home or studio into microphones, that's how I like to express myself as a musician, it's a place where I can get lost in my world of imagination and make something for people to connect to, I can't feel like that in front of an audience... it takes me so far out of the zone that I don't feel like I can get into the music."

== Visual work ==
Wilkinson creates the majority of the artwork for Bibio, including the covers for fi, Hand Cranked, The Apple and the Tooth, Mind Bokeh, Silver Wilkinson, and Ribbons. He also works on videography, having created the film for his Mind Bokeh album sampler, the music video for "A Tout L'heure" and co-directing the video for "Excuses" with Michael Robinson.

Wilkinson is an avid photographer, working with film and analog photography.

== Discography ==
=== Albums ===
- fi (2005, Mush Records)
- Hand Cranked (2006, Mush Records)
- Vignetting the Compost (2009, Mush Records)
- Ambivalence Avenue (2009, Warp Records)
- Mind Bokeh (2011, Warp Records) UK chart peak: No. 195
- Silver Wilkinson (2013, Warp Records)
- A Mineral Love (2016, Warp Records)
- Phantom Brickworks (2017, Warp Records)
- Ribbons (2019, Warp Records)
- Bib10 (2022, Warp Records)
- Phantom Brickworks (LP II) (2024, Warp Records)
- Answers (with Dorian Concept) (2026, Warp Records)

=== EPs ===
- Ovals and Emeralds (2009, Mush Records)
- The Apple and the Tooth (2009, Warp Records)
- T.O.Y.S. (2011)
- The Green EP (2014)
- The Serious EP (2016)
- Beyond Serious (2017)
- Zen Drums/Dada Drums (2018)
- Phantom Brickworks (IV & V) (2018)
- WXAXRXP Session (2019)
- Sleep on the Wing (2020, Warp Records)
- Vidiconia (2021)
- S.O.L. EP (2023)
- Sunbursting EP (2023)

=== Singles ===
- "Sheila Sets Sail" b/w "Tribio" (2006, Artist's Valley Records)
- "Ambivalence Avenue" b/w "Fire Ant" (2009, Warp Records)
- "Hedged-in" (2009) – contributed to The Relay Project, an online musical "collaboration"
- "Lovers' Carvings" (2011) (UK Singles Chart peak: No. 170)
- "K Is for Kelson" (2011)
- "Excuses / Old Friends" (2011)
- "Willenhall" (2012) – split single with Clark
- "À tout à l'heure" (2013)
- "Dye The Water Green" (2013)
- "Petals" (2015)
- "Town & Country" (2016, Warp Records)
- "Heath Town" (2016) – split single with Mark Pritchard and Clark
- "Capel Celyn" (2017)
- "The Art of Living / Spruce Tops" (2019)
- "Curls" (2019)
- "All This Love" Braxe + Falcon / Bibio (2024)
- "An Unopened Letter" (2025) – with Dorian Concept

=== Remixes ===
- Clark – "Ted (Bibio Remix)" (2006)
- Tidy Kid – "Smell (Bibio Remix)" (2007)
- Wax Stag – "Folk Rock (Bibio Remix)" (2008)
- Lymbyc Systym – "Truth Skull (Bibio Remix)" (2008)
- Epic45 – "The Stars in Autumn (Remixed by Bibio)" (2008)
- Lone – "Midnight Feast (Bibio Remix)" (2009)
- Neon Indian – "Mind, Drips (Bibio Remix)" (2009)
- DM Stith – "Abraham's Song (Bibio Remix)" (2009)
- The Gentlemen Losers – "Laureline (Bibio Remix)" (2009)
- Bibio – "The Palm Of Your Wave (Bibio Remix)" (2009)
- Grasscut – "The Door in the Wall (Bibio Mix)" (2010)
- Gonjasufi – "Candylane (Bibio Remix)" (2010)
- !!! – "The Most Certain Sure (Bibio Remix)" (2010)
- Bombay Bicycle Club – "Shuffle (Bibio Remix)" (2011)
- White Lies – "The Power & The Glory (Bibio Remix)" (2011)
- Noah and the Whale – "Waiting for My Chance to Come (Bibio Remix)" (2011)
- Amon Tobin – "Wooden Toy (Reworked by Bibio)" (2012)
- Gotye – "Somebody That I Used to Know (Bibio Remix)" (2012)
- Clark – "Absence (Bibio Remix)" (2013)
- Letherette – "After Dawn (Bibio Remix)" (2013)
- Tycho – "Spectre (Bibio Remix)" (2014)
- Wax Stag – "Night Trek (Bibio Remix)" (2015)
- Dorian Concept – "Ann River, Mn (Bibio Remix)" (2015)
- Giorgio Moroder and Raney Shockne – "Run Program (Bibio Remix)" (2016)
- Olivier St.Louis – "Forever 1 (Bibio Rework)" (2017)
- Villagers – "A Trick of the Light (Bibio Remix)" (2018)
- Dorian Concept – "Hide (Bibio Rework)" (2024)
- José González – "Crosses (Bibio Rework)" (2025)
