= Ribbons (album) =

Studio album by Bibio
- Released: 12 April 2019
- Genre: Folktronica; indie folk; electronic; experimental
- Length: 51:55
- Label: Warp
- Producer: Bibio

Bibio chronology
Phantom Brickworks (2017)	Ribbons (2019)	Sleep on the Wing (2020)

Singles from Ribbons
- 1. "Curls" Released: 12 March 2019

Ribbons is the ninth studio album by English producer Bibio, also known as Stephen Wilkinson, released on 12 April 2019. The album marks a return to the folktronica roots of his earlier career, such as on 2009's Vignetting the Compost. The album was well received by critics, accumulating an overall score of 81 out of 100 on Metacritic, indicating "universal acclaim".

== Critical reception ==
Professional ratings
Aggregate scores
Source	Rating
AnyDecentMusic?	7.2/10
Metacritic	81/100
Review scores
Source	Rating
AllMusic	4.5/5 stars
Exclaim!	8/10
The Line of Best Fit	7.5/10
Pitchfork	7.5/10

The album was generally well-regarded by music critics upon its initial release. On the review aggregator website Metacritic, Ribbons has a score of 81 out of 100 based on ten reviews, indicating "universal acclaim".

The review in Q called it a "homecoming" for the English producer. Canadian music publication Exclaim! stated, "With Ribbons, it is clear that Bibio is trying to take the best parts of his music over the years and bring them together into one concise, but eclectic, album, and on more than a few moments, he succeeds beautifully." The Line of Best Fit said that Bibio "bottles springtime" on the record, and hailed Wilkinson as "arguably one of the great genre hoppers of modern alternative music."

In a mostly positive review for Pitchfork, Philip Sherburne said that the album's "results are as reassuring as the memory of your favorite counselor picking up a weather-beaten acoustic guitar by the light of the campfire." Concluding the review for AllMusic, Heather Phares wrote that "Instead of distracting, Ribbons' tangents add to its masterful feel -- at this point in Wilkinson's career, his music is so rich that he can bring any aspect of it to the fore in ways that feel equally natural and surprising."

== Track listing ==
All tracks written, recorded, and produced by Stephen Wilkinson.

No.	Title	Length
1.	"Beret Girl"	1:56
2.	"The Art of Living"	3:17
3.	"Before"	3:11
4.	"Curls"	3:18
5.	"Ode to a Nuthatch"	2:03
6.	"Watch the Flies"	4:00
7.	"It's Your Bones"	4:43
8.	"You Couldn't Even Hear the Birds Singing"	1:23
9.	"Pretty Ribbons and Lovely Flowers"	4:17
10.	"Erdaydidder-Erdiddar"	4:55
11.	"Frankincense and Coal"	1:51
12.	"Old Graffiti"	3:29
13.	"Patchouli May"	4:04
14.	"Valley Wulf"	3:20
15.	"Quarters"	3:21
16.	"Under a Lone Ash"	2:55
Total length:		51:55
