= Mind Bokeh =

Studio album by Bibio
- Released: 29 March 2011
- Genre: Folktronica; indie pop; alternative R&B
- Length: 52:21
- Label: Warp
- Producer: Stephen James Wilkinson

Bibio chronology
The Apple and the Tooth (2009)	Mind Bokeh (2011)	Silver Wilkinson (2013)

Singles from Mind Bokeh
- 1. "Excuses" Released: 2011; 2. "K Is for Kelson" Released: 2011; 3. "T.O.Y.S. (Take Off Your Shirt)" Released: 2011

Professional ratings
Aggregate scores
Source	Rating
Metacritic	75/100
Review scores
Source	Rating
AllMusic	4/5 stars
BBC Music	favorable
Clash	8/10
MusicOMH	4/5 stars
Pitchfork	6.9/10
PopMatters	7/10 stars
Resident Advisor	3.5/5
The Skinny	4/5 stars
Slant Magazine	4/5 stars
Tiny Mix Tapes	1/5 marks

Mind Bokeh is a studio album by British electronic musician Bibio, released on Warp. It was released on 29 March 2011 in the United States and 4 April 2011 in the rest of the world. Bibio described the album as a "balance of the familiar and the non-familiar". The title comes from a Japanese word "Bokeh", which means the blurry, out-of-focus part of a photograph.

== Critical reception ==
At Metacritic, which assigns a weighted average score out of 100 to reviews from mainstream critics, the album received an average score of 75% based on 21 reviews, indicating "generally favorable reviews".

Clash named it the 24th best album of 2011.

== Track listing ==
All tracks are written by Stephen James Wilkinson

No.	Title	Length
1.	"Excuses"	5:58
2.	"Pretentious"	6:02
3.	"Anything New"	4:07
4.	"Wake Up!"	3:25
5.	"Light Seep"	3:53
6.	"Take Off Your Shirt"	4:04
7.	"Artists' Valley"	6:00
8.	"K Is for Kelson"	3:28
9.	"Mind Bokeh"	2:33
10.	"More Excuses"	4:27
11.	"Feminine Eye"	1:50
12.	"Saint Christopher"	6:34
Total length:		52:21

Japanese edition bonus track
No.	Title	Length
13.	"Vertical Helical Stan"	2:24
Total length:		54:45

== Charts ==
Chart	Peak position
US Heatseekers Albums (Billboard)	6
UK Albums Chart	195
UK Indie Chart	33
