= The Nature of Imitation =

Studio album by Dorian Concept
- Released: 3 August 2018
- Genre: IDM; electronic
- Length: 39:14
- Label: Brainfeeder

Dorian Concept chronology
Joined Ends (2014)	The Nature of Imitation (2018)

Professional ratings
Aggregate scores
Source	Rating
Metacritic	78/100
Review scores
Source	Rating
AllMusic	4/5 stars
The A.V. Club	B+
Crack Magazine	6/10
Exclaim!	9/10
Pitchfork	7.2/10
PopMatters	8/10

The Nature of Imitation is the third studio album by Austrian electronic musician and producer Oliver Thomas Johnson, under his stage name Dorian Concept. It was released on 3 August 2018 by Brainfeeder.

== Critical reception ==
The Nature of Imitation was met with "generally favorable" reviews from critics. At Metacritic, which assigns a weighted average rating out of 100 to reviews from mainstream publications, this release received an average score of 78, based on 8 reviews. Aggregator Album of the Year gave the release a 74 out of 100 based on a critical consensus of 9 reviews.

== Track listing ==
The Nation of Imitation track listing
No.	Title	Length
1.	"Promises"	3:57
2.	"Angel Shark"	2:53
3.	"J Buyers"	4:51
4.	"A Mother's Lament"	1:52
5.	"No Time Not Mine"	3:56
6.	"Pedestrians"	3:56
7.	"Self Similarity"	4:12
8.	"Dishwater"	2:51
9.	"E13"	4:43
10.	"The Space"	3:36
11.	"You Give and Give"	2:27
