= Ambivalence Avenue =

Studio album by Bibio
- Released: 22 June 2009
- Genre: Electronic; pop; instrumental hip hop; folktronica
- Length: 42:52
- Label: Warp
- Producer: Stephen Wilkinson

Bibio chronology
Vignetting the Compost (2009)	Ambivalence Avenue (2009)	The Apple and the Tooth (2009)

Singles from Ambivalence Avenue
- 1. "Ambivalence Avenue / Fire Ant" Released: 8 June 2009

Professional ratings
Aggregate scores
Source	Rating
Metacritic	78/100
Review scores
Source	Rating
AllMusic	4.5/5 stars
Exclaim!	favorable
The Guardian	3/5 stars
Pitchfork	8.3/10
PopMatters	7/10 stars
Tiny Mix Tapes	4/5 marks

Ambivalence Avenue is a studio album by English folk/electronica musician Bibio, released in 2009. It is his first album on Warp.

== Critical reception ==
At Metacritic, which assigns a weighted average score out of 100 to reviews from mainstream critics, Ambivalence Avenue received an average score of 78% based on 16 reviews, indicating "generally favorable reviews".

Pitchfork named it the 33rd best album of 2009.

== Track listing ==
All tracks are written by Stephen Wilkinson

No.	Title	Length
1.	"Ambivalence Avenue"	3:42
2.	"Jealous of Roses"	2:35
3.	"All the Flowers"	1:05
4.	"Fire Ant"	4:58
5.	"Haikuesque (When She Laughs)"	3:32
6.	"Sugarette"	3:54
7.	"Lovers' Carvings"	3:58
8.	"Abrasion"	2:46
9.	"S'Vive"	4:05
10.	"The Palm of Your Wave"	2:25
11.	"Cry! Baby!"	3:57
12.	"Dwrcan"	3:55
Total length:		42:52

== Charts ==
Chart	Peak position
US Top Dance/Electronic Albums (Billboard)	16
