= Hand Cranked =

Studio album by Bibio
- Released: 7 March 2006
- Recorded: England
- Genre: Folktronica
- Length: 48:11
- Label: Mush
- Producer: Stephen Wilkinson

Bibio chronology
fi (2005)	Hand Cranked (2006)	Vignetting the Compost (2009)

Professional ratings
Review scores
Source	Rating
AllMusic	3.5/5 stars
The Daily Telegraph	(favourable)
Pitchfork Media	6.1/10
Tiny Mix Tapes	3/5 stars

Hand Cranked is the second album by the music producer Bibio. It was released on 7 March 2006 on Mush Records.

== Critical reception ==
XLR8R wrote that "several songs wouldn’t be memorable if it weren’t for their ancient sound quality. But in our age of bloodless pop productions, [Bibio] is still welcome."

== Track listing ==
All tracks are written by Stephen Wilkinson.

No.	Title	Writer(s)	Length
1.	"The Cranking House"		2:01
2.	"Cherry Go Round"		5:53
3.	"Quantock"		4:07
4.	"Black Country Blue"		2:07
5.	"Marram"	Wilkinson, Richard Roberts	2:07
6.	"Aberriw"		1:46
7.	"Zoopraxiphone"		3:52
8.	"DYFI"		4:02
9.	"Ffwrnais"		3:10
10.	"Woodington"		5:19
11.	"Above the Rooftops"		3:41
12.	"Snowbow"		3:44
13.	"Maroon Lagoon"		2:37
14.	"Overgrown"		5:36
Total length:			48:11

2020 reissue bonus tracks
No.	Title	Writer(s)	Length
15.	"Madame Grotesque"	Wilkinson, Richard Roberts	4:55
16.	"Cantaloup Carousel (1999)"		5:21
17.	"Firework Owl"		3:45
18.	"Odd Lips"		2:45
19.	"The Last Bicycle"		3:46
