= Phantom Brickworks =

Studio album by Bibio
- Released: 3 November 2017
- Genres: Ambient; minimal; electronic; neo-classical; experimental
- Length: 73:13
- Label: Warp
- Producer: Bibio

Bibio chronology
Beyond Serious (2017)	Phantom Brickworks (2017)	Ribbons (2019)

Singles from Phantom Brickworks
- 1. "Phantom Brickworks III" Released: 19 September 2017; 2. "Capel Celyn" Released: 25 October 2017

Phantom Brickworks is the eighth studio album by English producer Stephen Wilkinson, known by his stage name Bibio. Released on 3 November 2017, it's his sixth album for Warp Records and his first entirely ambient record. The album is a set of improvised compositions consisting of simple piano, synth, and guitar loops surrounded by tape hiss and field recordings. Making the songs based on the concept that "places can be haunted by meaning," Wilkinson mentally went into both real and fantasy places when producing the tracks. The album was well-received by reviewers, who called it Bibio's most accomplished record, and landed at number 11 on Time Out New York's list of the best albums of 2017.

== Concept ==
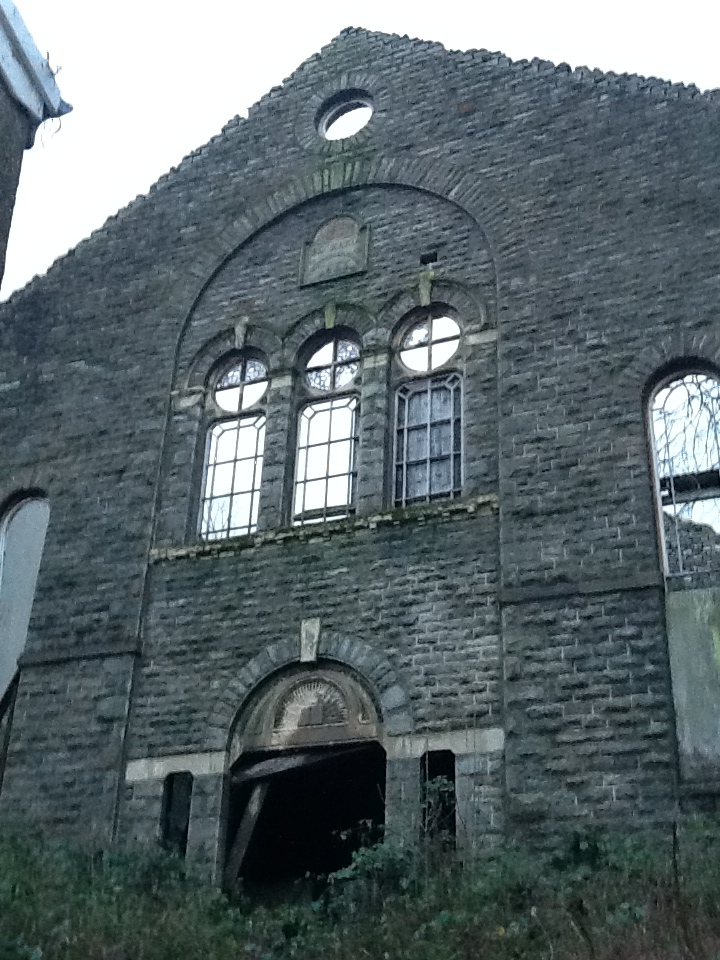
"Capel Bethania" is named after a chapel demolished in 1991 (pictured in 2014).

The pieces on Phantom Brickworks gave Wilkinson "a mental portal into" real and imagined settings. He made the LP based on the concept that "places can be haunted by meaning," reasoning, "human beings are highly sensitive to the atmospheres of places, which can be enhanced or dramatically altered when you learn about the context of their history." The songs are very similar to electronic voice phenomena recordings in their attempt to record sounds of ghostly activity. Most of the song titles are references to parts of the United Kingdom, such as the track named after Capel Celyn, a community in Gwynedd, Wales that was intentionally flooded to create a reservoir in 1965, and "Capel Bethania," a song named after a chapel demolished in 1991.

== Production and composition ==
While elements of ambient music have been included in all of Bibio's records, Phantom Brickworks is his first entirely ambient release. The album is a set of improvised, slow-tempo minimal ambient electronic compositions that were written and recorded in more than ten years using only a microphone and loop pedal. Compared by multiple reviewers to the works of William Basinski, Gas, and the more ambient records of Aphex Twin and Brian Eno, each song involves short piano, synthesizer, and guitar loops being transformed into "ghostly textures," described Time Out NY. Sam Walker-Smart analyzed the sounds "constantly weave in and out of the mix, drifting by as if in a dream."

Phantom Brickworks has a very spacious structure that uses lots of reverberation, delay, and elements of long sustain in the composition: XLR8R analyzed it has a "widescreen vibe," where the tracks have "patient, sometimes nearly imperceptible cycles of accretion and subsidence" and, as a result, "feel as much like landscapes as they do music." On each track, hazy filtering, field recordings, and tape hiss are present to either drown out or undermine the importance of the main loop. As Clash magazine noted, "the material on Phantom Brickworks writes its own rules [of ambient music] as it progresses, with Bibio uncovering fresh techniques simply through the act of performance." Writer Philippa Nicole Barr states that in achieving a haunting vibe, the music's rhythmic structure follows a sort-of offbeat pattern that "conveys that sense of the uncanny – slowing the listener down to a meditative state, so that they can begin to imagine the many phantoms all around them."

== Release and promotion ==
"Phantom Brickworks III" and "Capel Celyn" were released on 19 September 2017 and 25 October 2017 respectively as preview tracks for Phantom Brickworks. On 2 November 2017, the "Phantom Brickworks" audio/visual installation was held at The Boiler House in The Old Truman Brewery, London with music from the album serving as the soundtrack. Warp Records summarized it as a "stunning historical venue, exploring themes of landscape, time and place through large-scale projections of films." Warp released Phantom Brickworks on 3 November 2017. The music video for "Capel Celyn," released on 30 November 2017, is footage of remains of the song's titular town.

== Critical reception ==
Professional ratings
Aggregate scores
Source	Rating
AnyDecentMusic?	7.5/10
Metacritic	77/100
Review scores
Source	Rating
AllMusic	4/5 stars
Clash	7/10
Drowned in Sound	8/10
Exclaim!	6/10
Mojo	4/5 stars
Pitchfork	8.2/10
Q	3/5 stars
Tiny Mix Tapes	4.5/5 marks
Uncut	7/10
XLR8R	7.5/10

Several critics called Phantom Brickworks Bibio's most accomplished release. Some reviewers praised Bibio for taking on a new style, No Ripcord stating that it "solidifies Bibio as an artist of remarkable versatility," while others highlighted its ghostly yet listener-friendly atmosphere. The Line of Best Fit claimed, "With Phantom Brickworks Bibio has not only created a record that stands apart from his other Warp albums to date, but has cemented his mastery of the atmospheric; creating an album that can imprint on a listeners’ surroundings like few others." PopMatters applauded the album for being more "consistent" than previous Bibio albums, which "tend to lose their identity in his experimentations, ending up as a pile of mixed goods." The Music opined, "It'd be tempting to write this off as a potboiler in between major projects, but there are subtle undercurrents of emotion that gently reel in the patient listener." Daniel Sylvester of Exclaim!, however, criticized the tracks for being too long, "only the two-minute "Ivy Charcoal" providing the listener with something wholly digestible." Time Out New York ranked it the eleventh best album of 2017, and AllMusic placed it on their list of the year's best electronic albums.

== Track listing ==
All tracks written, recorded, and produced by Stephen Wilkinson and mastered by Guy Davie at Electric Mastering in London.

No.	Title	Length
1.	"09:13"	7:03
2.	"Phantom Brickworks"	13:47
3.	"Pantglas"	4:31
4.	"Phantom Brickworks II"	16:44
5.	"Capel Celyn"	8:12
6.	"Phantom Brickworks III"	9:27
7.	"Ivy Charcoal"	2:03
8.	"Branch Line"	8:42
9.	"Capel Bethania"	2:44
Total length:		73:13

== Release history ==
Region	Date	Format(s)	Label
Worldwide	3 November 2017	CD; digital download; vinyl	Warp
