= Sleep on the Wing =

EP by Bibio
- Released: 12 June 2020
- Recorded: 2019
- Genres: Experimental; indie pop; electronic; folk
- Length: 28:11
- Label: Warp
- Producer: Steven Wilkinson

Bibio chronology
Ribbons (album) (2019)	Sleep on the Wing (2020)	Bib10 (2022)

Sleep on the Wing is the follow-up to Bibio's ninth studio album, Ribbons; it was announced on 5 May 2020, and was released on 12 June 2020. The release consists of ten new songs, only two of which contain lyrics. Upon release, the EP received generally favourable reviews.

== Recording and release ==
The mostly instrumental songs were recorded at Bibio's countryside home in the midlands of England, with only two tracks featuring lyrics. The music includes field recordings of nature sounds such as birds and running water. All instruments were performed by Bibio himself, including acoustic guitar, violin, cello, bass guitar, tape loop, and turntable.

The EP was announced on 5 May 2020 along with the release of the title track. The same day, a music video directed by Sonnye Lim premiered on YouTube, featuring animated elements from the artwork for the release. The EP was released on Warp Records on 12 June. According to Bibio, the release is a companion piece to the 2019 album Ribbons and shouldn't be considered a full album. On 15 June, Bibio released a music video for "Oakmoss" that featured the artist playing a fully acoustic version of the song. Throughout July and August 2020, videos for the songs "Otter Shadows", "Crocus", "A Couple Swim", and "Awpockes" that featured rural landscapes were released on Bibio's YouTube channel.

== Reception ==
Professional ratings
Aggregate scores
Source	Rating
Metacritic	70/100
Review scores
Source	Rating
AllMusic	4/5 stars
Exclaim!	7/10
PopMatters	7/10
Uncut	6/10

Sleep on the Wing received an average of 70/100 based on five reviews on the aggregator Metacritic, indicating generally favourable reviews. AllMusic named it one of the best releases of 2020, calling it "quintessentially Bibio," and "just as winning" as the 2019 album Ribbons, writing that "spending more time with it is a joy." Exclaim! magazine commented that "the sound is never gritty or raucous, by any means, but the almost jarring collision of genre remains hopeful without getting comfortable." In a mostly positive review, PopMatters said that "it’s a pretty good record, and the songs will linger with you after you’ve stopped spinning the record – it’s just that Wilkinson is capable of so much more."

== Track listing ==
All tracks are written by Stephen Wilkinson.

No.	Title	Length
1.	"Sleep on the Wing"	3:30
2.	"A Couple Swim"	3:47
3.	"Lightspout Hollow"	2:33
4.	"Oakmoss"	3:41
5.	"Miss Blennerhassett"	1:34
6.	"The Milky Way Over Ratlinghope"	4:21
7.	"Awpockes"	2:13
8.	"Crocus"	2:24
9.	"Otter Shadows"	1:23
10.	"Watching Thus, the Heron Is All Pool"	2:45
Total length:		25:54

== Charts ==
Chart performance for Sleep on the Wing
Chart (2020)	Peak position
UK Album Downloads (Official Charts)	75
UK Folk Albums (Official Charts)	22
UK Independent Albums (Official Charts)	16
