= Dorian Concept =

Austrian composer and music producer

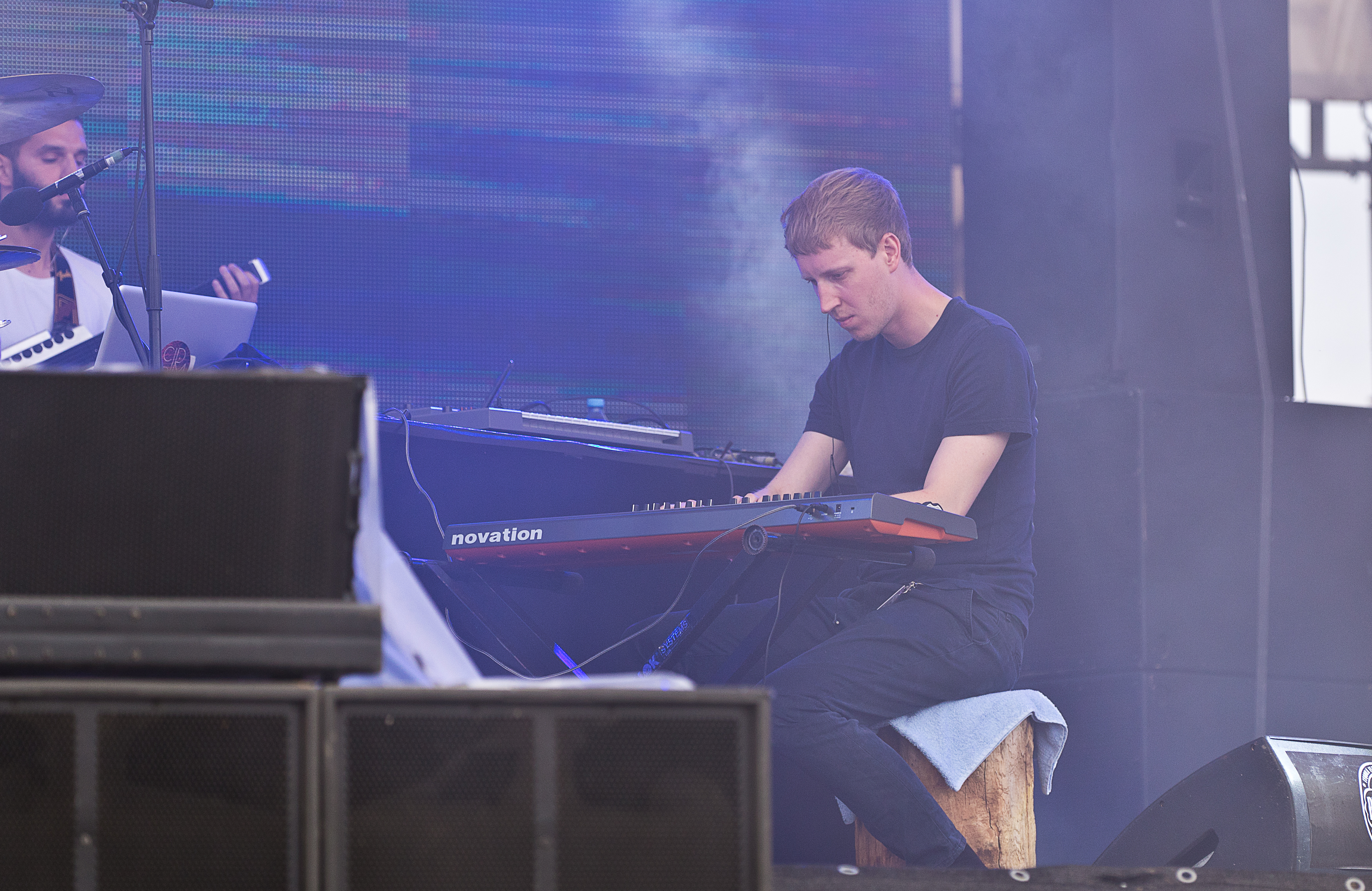
- Dorian Concept performing in 2015

Background information
- Born: Oliver Thomas Johnson; 16 September 1984 (age 42); Vienna, Austria
- Genres: Electronic; jazz
- Occupations: Record producer; musician; composer
- Instruments: Synthesizer; keyboards
- Years active: 2006–present
- Labels: Kindred Spirits; Nod Navigators; Affine; Bonzzaj; A Few Among Others; TLM; Ninja Tune; Brainfeeder; Play Instinct; -OUS
- Website: dorianconcept.com

Oliver Thomas Johnson (born 16 September 1984), known by the alias Dorian Concept, is an Austrian composer, music producer and keyboardist whose work draws on an eclectic variety of sources including modal and free jazz, funk, hip-hop, electronic, ambient, and soundscape music. Johnson adopted his stage name as a teenager as a reference to the Dorian scale.

Dorian Concept is also a member of the Austrian funk band Jacob's Salty and Bamboozling Ladder (JSBL). He also has periodically toured as a keyboardist for Flying Lotus (along with Richard Spaven on drums) and collaborated with the Cinematic Orchestra.

== Biography ==
Born in Vienna, Johnson studied multimedia art with a focus on acoustic engineering and graphics at the University of Applied Sciences in Salzburg from 2005 to 2009. During this period, he won Elektronikland Salzburg prizes for composition in electronic music in 2005 and 2007 and released his first EP on line in 2006.

Between 2006 and 2008, he also posted a popular series of five short videos on YouTube under the moniker of "yorktownrecreation" called "Fooling Around on Micro Korg" that show him improvising on the microKORG (and other keyboards, such as the Alesis Micron, Korg Nanokey, and Casio SA-21) and totalled over one million views after posting. He is among the self-proclaimed generation of "bedroom producers" who participated in the emergence of an international beat community based the accessibility of digital production technology and early Internet fora, such as Myspace, in the first decade of the 2000s.

In 2007, the BBC Radio 1 producer Benji B "discovered" Dorian Concept at the Red Bull Music Academy in Toronto, where Paul Movahedi ("The Clonious"), a Viennese bandmate of his and RMBA participant, gave Benji B a CD with 10 unreleased Dorian Concept tracks that Benji B started airing on his show and playing in London clubs. BBC Radio 1's Gilles Peterson also started giving Dorian Concept air-time on his program "Worldwide" and included him in the line-up of worldwide events, and Dorian Concept subsequently started to receive invitations to major electronic music festivals. He also participated in the Red Bull Music Academy in Barcelona in 2008 and has since been involved in a number of Red Bull Music Academy events.

His first album, When Planets Explode, appeared in 2009 preceded and was followed by a number of EPs and remixes. In 2010, Ninja Tune invited him to contribute a track, "Her Tears Taste Like Pears," to its twentieth anniversary box set, Ninja Tune XX, and Ninja released an EP of his under the same title shortly thereafter. He performed at a number of Ninja XX events in Europe in 2010, including the Ninja gala celebration at Royal Albert Hall with the London Metropolitan Orchestra and the Cinematic Orcherstra in November, where he arranged and performed tracks from his Ninja EP for an ensemble including London Metropolitan string quartet accompaniment and the Cinematic Orchestra's saxophonist Tom Chant.

In 2011, Jason Swincoe invited him to continue his collaboration with Cinematic Orchestra by asking him to compose film music (with Tom Chant) for two avant-garde shorts by Peter Tscherkassky, "Outer Space" and "Dream Work," for the Cinematic Orchestra's "In Motion" series in which musicians are asked to compose original scores for classic short films, which also gave him an additional opportunity to perform in a formal concert settings with string accompaniment at the Barbican Centre in London and Tokyo. He also has performed in a more formal setting at the Austrian Cultural Forum in New York City.

Later in the same year, his touring and production activity dropped off with the exception of a few remixes, and he spend over two years working on a new sound and material for his second album, Joined Ends, which Ninja Tune released in October 2014. His third album, The Nature of Imitation, was released by Brainfeeder in 2018.

In 2020, his song "You're Untouchable" was featured on Grand Theft Auto Online radio station FlyLo FM, through The Cayo Perico Heist update.

In 2021, he posted on his Facebook page that he has finished working on his next album. Titled What We Do For Others, the album was released on 28 October 2022 via Brainfeeder.

In 2025, he released two singles "Breathe" and "An Unopened Letter" (with Bibio). These are part of the album Miniatures, which was released in November 2025, and contains 24 tracks. In his YouTube post, he announced that Miniatures will host a "collection of music from the performance videos I've been sharing for close two decades", and that putting it out would feel "both celebratory and archival."

== Style ==
Although he had classical piano training as a child, he does not consider himself to be classically-trained. As an autodidact, he identifies funk, hip-hop, jazz, and electronica as the primary influences for his music. His music cannot "easily be categorized, yet he has already developed his own, recognisable sound" as Benji B has observed in his blog in 2008.

Reviewers of his original releases have noted that his sound "fuses technical jazz flair with… programming skills[,] and strictly bumping beats with abstract electronica harmonics,…" and is "synthetic, electronic and beat-driven, and yet… musical." "Unconventional chord changes, expressive dynamics and quirky layers of counterpoint melodies,..." also have been identified as "...parts of his unmistakable musical voice,..." along with his ability to "...dot effortlessly through different genres and styles: from sublime electronica to hyperactive garage to avant-garde dancehall."

His trademark instrument for production and performance has been the microKORG synthesizer. During solo live sets, he has used the Ableton Live software to play his tracks and improvises over them on the microKORG or manipulates them with the microKORG or the tools available on DJ consoles. On his "minimal set-up", examples are available online.

The release of Joined Ends in October 2014 marked a departure from his established musical voice and reliance on the microKORG as a platform for digital production and performance. Johnson purchased older retro equipment, including a Moog synthesizer, Wurlitzer electronic piano, and Roland SH-101, and began to work with analogue media, including his own voice to create "an agile body of work filled with playful melodic earworms, complex textures, and vituosic transformations." Johnson noted that the "new gear was important because the microKORG… really tied me down to my old sound… [W]orking with analogue gear was a way for me to put my focus back on playing. It feels like my first musical cycle is closing and the start of a new one." His aspiration was—in comparison to his frenetic, established sound club—to "do something simple." His tracks are based on the technique of recording himself performing with analogue media and then "self-sampling" and reworking the analogue material in the course of production. In an interview, he has described himself as "an autodidact jazz musician, who samples himself." To perform this new material and sound, he also developed a new trio stage show with his long-standing Viennese friends and band-mates from JSBL: Paul Movahedi ("The Clonious") on bass and Clemens Bacher ("Cid Rim") on percussion.

After Joined Ends was released, Johnson toured extensively and then dropped out of sight again for over two years to work on The Nature of Imitation, which appeared on his third label, Brainfeeder, as his third LP in August 2018. For Johnson, The Nature of Imitation also represented an "aesthetic break" from Joined Ends and a process of "reinvention" that entailed returning "to my old approaches but from a completely different perspective" and resulted in a "brand new sound." This album is a synthesis of the widely disparate stylistic elements from of his previous two albums and simultaneously an expression of the "two Dorian Concepts": "…the hectic [one]… whirling like a tornado over the keys… of a defenseless microsynthisizer" and "the audodidactic, multi-instrumentalist, electronic chamber musician and detail-loving improvisor."

Johnson's fourth album, What We Do For Others, appeared in October 2022 and represented a renewed transition in his approach to composing. This album was "a step away from the in-your-face maximalism" of his previous music, his "drive… to somehow strive for perfection," and his propensity to "overwork" his compositions, and it reflected the fact that his "approach to playing the keyboards has changed." It entailed him "embracing the performer side of what I do more and more": his own spontaneous improvisation. He consequently shifted his technique of "self-sampling" from reworking short segments and tightly-strung loops to relying on longer first-takes that he recorded live and then wove unedited into the fabric of each song. The technique of "me playing all kinds of different key instruments, singing, and using fx-units to create these freeform compositions" created an album that has "something of a 'band sound.'" Johnson said that he "wanted to see how little 'control' I could exert on the music whilst recording it – to almost let the music make itself." What We Do For Others reflected the established features of Johnson's trademark musical voice, but it but it put them together in a looser, more relaxed, and more melodic manner.

Johnson's next release in 2024—a twenty-minute, nine-track EP Music From a Room Full of Synths—was a belated result of a two-week residency in the summer of 2020 at SMEM (Swiss Museum & Center for Electronic Music Instruments). It also reflected the approach he used in his 2022 album What We Do For Others insofar as it was based on using raw material and his insight that "there's something magical that happens in these first takes we often call drafts." Johnson was free to experiment with instruments from extensive SMEM collection of over 5,000 vintage devices, and he relied on his intuitive understanding of how synthesizers work to record, mix, and edit the nine tracks on this EP on-site in the SMEM playroom in the course of his two-week stay. "Nothing was programmed—it was all played live," Johnson said. "Exploring the distinctiveness of each instrument and celebrating their differences [was] at the heart of this project," which resulted in a record he described as "a playful excursion."

In light of the fact that Johnson has established himself in a distinct niche in the international electronic music scene, he is widely acknowledged by Austrian music critics as the leading Austrian electronic musician and composer of his generation. In 2019, Das Klangforum in Vienna, one of world's leading ensembles for contemporary music, commissioned Johnson to compose a forty-minute piece for a sixteen instrument ensemble: a task which marked a dramatic departure from his previous releases in terms of its format and orchestration.

"Hyperopia" consists of eight "scenes" that explore the challenges, contours and interfaces of transcribing the timbres, rhythms, and distinctive voice of Johnson's digitally-composed music for acoustic orchestral performance, and it eclectically references a wide spectrum of genres including minimal music, modal jazz, musique conrète, and electronic music from the 1990s. Its world premiere—originally scheduled for April 2020 at the Konzerthaus in Vienna—was postponed due to the coronavirus pandemic, and belatedly took place under the auspices of the Transart Festival in Bolazano, Italy, on 9 September 2020, with a repeat performance at the Musikprotokoll Graz on 11 October 2020.

The German composer, producer, and radio moderator Sven Helbig organized a transcription of scenes II and V of "Hyperopia" for a full-fledged symphony orchestra that the Deutsche Symphonie Orchester Berlin performed on 13 September 2024 under the auspices of the concert series Schöne Töne Live. This concert included Johnson improvising two compositions live on a Roland SH-101 that entailed sequentially layering musical voices with a looper.

Johnson's next excursion from the realm of electronically-generated sounds into the world of classical acoustic musical performance entailed collaboration with the Viennese ensemble Studio Dan, which transcribed an electronically-composed piece of Johnson's for ten voices consisting of eight scenes. When We Meet, an investigation of musical textures without solo voices, premiered in a performance by a fifteen-piece Studio Dan ensemble on 26 September 2024 at MuTh in Vienna.

Johnson's remix of Yuma Yamaguchi's "Concordia" in May 2025 received critics from various sites, such as the Zillions magazine describing it as "…jazz, glitch, and orchestral pop packed in a glistening ribbon", and Fernando Nunez from Visual Atelier 8 viewing his remix as bringing "…Yamaguchi's already emotive composition, infusing it with glitchy jazz cadences, warped keys, and kinetic textures…"

== Discography ==
=== Albums ===
Title	Details
When Planets Explode	Released: 12 February, 2009; Label: Kindred Spirits / Nod Navigators; Format: LP, CD, MP3
Joined Ends	Released: October 20, 2014; Label: Ninja Tune; Format: LP, CD, MP3
The Nature of Imitation	Released: August 3, 2018; Label: Brainfeeder; Format: LP, CD, MP3
What We Do for Others	Released: October 28, 2022; Label: Brainfeeder; Format: LP, FLAC
Miniatures	Featuring: Bibio; Released: November 14, 2025; Label: Play Instinct; Format: MP3
Answers (by Bibio)	With: Dorian Concept; Released: October 16, 2026; Label: Warp Records; Format: CD, MP3

=== EPs ===
- 2 Feet for You (Circulations, 2008)
- The Fucking Formula (Kindred Spirits/Nod Navigators, 2008)
- Maximized Minimalization (Affine Records, 2008)
- Sam Irl and Dorian Concept / Echo Skill Hifi - Untitled One / Gecko (Bonzzaj Recordings / A Few Among Others Records, 2008)
- Trilingual Dance Sexperience (Affine Records, 2009)
- Untitled (TLM Records, 2010)
- Her Tears Taste Like Pears (Ninja Tune, 2011)
- Joined Ends Remix EP (Ninja Tune, 2015)
- Toothbrush/Booth Thrust (Brainfeeder, 2019)
- The Jitters (Brainfeeder, 2020)
- Hide (Play Instinct, 2024)
- Music from a Room Full of Synths (-OUS, 2024)

=== Singles ===
- "Draft Culture" (Ninja Tune, 2014)
- "J Buyers" (Brainfeeder, 2018)
- "Eigendynamik (Elevator Version)" (Brainfeeder, 2020)
- "Let It All Go" (Brainfeeder, 2022)
- "You're Untouchable" (Brainfeeder, 2022)
- "Hide (CS01 Version)" (Play Instinct, 2023)
- "Hide (Slow)" (Play Instinct, 2024)
- "Cuchaule" (-OUS, 2024)
- "Space II" (Play Instinct, 2024)
- "Breathe" (Play Instinct, 2025)
- "An Unopened Letter" (with Bibio) (Play Instinct, 2025)
- "Shame" (with Dorian Concept) by Bibio (Warp Records, 2026)
- "Lichen Trip" (with Dorian Concept) by Bibio (Warp Records, 2026)
- "Hammock Portal" (with Dorian Concept) by Bibio (Warp Records, 2026)
- "Womb Glow" (with Dorian Concept) by Bibio (Warp Records, 2026)

=== Internet releases ===
- Nouns and the Relevance of Wood (2005)
- Seek When Is Her (2006)
- Dorian Concept & Ginga - FM4 Soundpark Studio2 Session (2008)
- A TrebleO Beat Tape (2008)
- "Dead Ends" (2015)
- "Pong Ping Song" (2018)

=== Tracks on compilation albums ===
- "Warm Cookies and Cold Milk" on Barracuda Astronauts (Vitamine-Source, 2004)
- "I'm a Basketball Mom" on Elevate Compilation (Elevate, 2008)
- "Sandwich Terror" on Blue Jemz-Beat Machine (Scion Audio/Visual, 2008)
- "Timetravellin (Fatima & Dorian Concept)" & "Do I know you? (Fatima, Cohen, Cuthead & Dorian Concept)" on Various Assets - Not For Sale: Red Bull Music Academy Barcelona 2008 (RMBA, 2009)
- Synths on "Welcome to a Bluer Blue Sky" on Decivilize After Consumption by Bluermutt (Nexsound, 2009)
- "Be Tween" on Beat Dimensions, Vol. 2 (Rush Hour, 2009)
- "Her Tears Taste Like Pears" on CD 1 of the Ninja Tune XX box (Ninja Tune, 2010)
- "Harpoon Love" & "Row Out" on What a Fine Mess We Made by JSBL (Affine Records, 2011)
- "Outer Space" [9:26] & "Dream Work" [9:46] on The Cinematic Orchestra: In Motion # 1 (with Tom Chant) (Ninja Tune & Beat Records, 2012)
- "Empty Everything" on AMADA (All City Dublin, 2013)
- "Hand" on Kutmah presents: Sketchbook Radio Archives, Vol. 1 (IZWID, 2018)
- "Eigendynamik" on Brainfeeder X (Brainfeeder, 2018)
- "G-Thong (Dorian Concept Restring)" (with Ogris Debris) on Compost Deep House Selection Vol. 1 - Solar Winds - Sunny Vibes - compiled & mixed by Art-D-Fact and Rupert & Munnert (Compost Records, 2023)
- "Do, Undo, Redo - Mixed" on fabric presents salute by salute (fabric Records, 2025)

=== Collaborations ===
- "FACE TO FACE (feat. Dorian Concept)" & "TIMES RUNNIN (feat. Dorian Concept)" on COSMIC WAR OF THE PLANETS by DJ BUZZ (Personal Records, 2009)
- "Dataflow" & "693 Balloons" (with Cid Rim) on Between the Dots by The Clonious (Ubiquity Records, 2009)
- "After All" (featuring Sacha Williamson) on When Time Doesn't Know Itself by Orakel (4lux Recordings, 2011)
- "Unicorn T-Shirt (feat. Dorian Concept)" on Plaza Matadero (RMBA) EP by Chico Unicornio (Infinita Música Paraíso, 2011)
- "Sofuckinfrightnin (Microkorg by Dorian Concept)" by Kidkanevil on Project Mooncircle 10th Anniversary Compilation (Project Mooncircle, 2012)
- "Forever 1" (featuring Olivier Day Soul) on Lantern by Hudson Mohawke (Warp Records, 2015)
- "Four Eighteen" (with The Clonious) on Material by Cid Rim (LuckyMe, 2017)
- "Trigger Happy (feat. Dorian Concept & Lukas König)" on Wanting Machine by Peter Rom (JazzWerkstatt Records, 2021)
- "Fakin It" (with The Clonious) on Body Memory by Wandl (Sichtexot Records, 2022)

=== Remixes ===
- "Chico (Dorian Concept Remix)" on Low Club EP by Fulgeance (Musique Large, 2008)
- "Re:Haydn Remix (DorianConcept Version)" (Note: All cases of his alias from music platforms are concatenated) on re:Haydn by Joseph Haydn (Deutsche Grammophon & Universal Music Group, 2009)
- "Game Over (Dorian Concept Remix)" by Dabrye; "A Little Bit of Feel Good (Dorian Concept Remix)" by Jamie Lidell; "Nightmare (Dorian Concept remix)" by Phat Kat & Guilty Simpson; "Stay Fly (Dorian Concept remix)" by Three 6 Mafia, preceding the release of his album When Planets Explode
- "Emora (Dorian Concept Remix)" on Adroit Adventures by The Clonious (Ubiquity Records, 2009)
- "The Light (Dorian Concept Remix)" on The Light Remixes by Some Freak, Andreya Triana & Ritornell (Wald Entertainment, 2009)
- "G-Thong (Dorian Concept Restring)" on Compost Black Label #57 by Ogris Debris (Compost Records, 2009)
- "Flashlight (Dorian Concept Remix)" on Flashlight by Waxolutionists (Sunshine Enterprises, 2009)
- "We're Both Waiting (Dorian Concept Remix)" on Sleep Over Remixes Vol. 1 by Misel Quitno (Ehstrawlogy, 2009)
- "The Flu (Dorian Concept Remix)" on Twice Upon Two Times Remixed by JSBL (Affine Records, 2010)
- "Window (Dorian Concept Remix)" on Light Up Bright Fires by PVT (Warp Records, 2010)
- "Game Over (Dorian Concept Remix)" on Arousal (2) - 404 Mixtape by Dabrye (Error Broadcast, 2010)
- "Deliver The Weird (Dorian Concept Remix)" on CD 6 of the Ninja Tune XX box by Clifford Gilberto (Ninja Tune, 2010)
- "Voices (Dorian Concept Remix)" on Drift Remixed by Nosaj Thing (Timetable Records, 2010)
- "Sinus (Dorian Concept Remix)" on Blindside by Sofa Surfers (Monocope Productions, 2011)
- "Draw (Dorian Concept Remix)" on CID RIM by Cid Rim (LuckyMe, 2012)
- "D&T (Dorian Concept Remix)" on D&T by Letherette (Ninja Tune, 2013)
- "Postpartum (Dorian Concept Remix)" by Taylor McFerrin (Brainfeeder, 2016)
- "Honen Bushi '豊年節' (Dorian Concept Remix)" on Hajime-Uta Ugen - Chitose Hajime Amami Shima-Uta REMIX '元唄 幽玄 ～元ちとせ奄美シマ唄 Remix～' by Chitose Hajime (Universal Music Group, 2019)
- "Lessons (Dorian Concept Remix)" on To Believe (Remixes) by The Cinematic Orchestra (Ninja Tune, 2020)
- "Wasting My Time (Dorian Concept Remix)" (featuring Mr. Beale) on Period Of Time (The Remixes) by Demuja (Universal Music Group, 2021)
- "Jah (Dorian Concept Remix)" & "Jah (Dorian Concept Dub)" on Jah by Sabrina Bellaouel (InFiné, 2023)
- "Concordia (Dorian Concept Remix)" on Concordia (Remixes) by yuma yamaguchi (LISZTOMANIA INC., 2025)
