= Fi (album) =

fi

Studio album by Bibio
- Released: 8 February 2005
- Recorded: England
- Genre: Folktronica
- Length: 48:52
- Label: Mush
- Producer: Stephen Wilkinson

Bibio chronology
fi (2005)	Hand Cranked (2006)

Professional ratings
Review scores
Source	Rating
AllMusic	3.5/5 stars
Exclaim!	favorable
Pitchfork Media	7.3/10
Tiny Mix Tapes	3/5 marks

fi is the debut studio album by English record producer Bibio (Stephen Wilkinson). It was released on Mush Records in February 2005, and reissued by Warp Records in 2015.

== Track listing ==
All tracks are written by Stephen Wilkinson.

No.	Title	Length
1.	"Cherry Blossom Road"	1:26
2.	"Bewley in White"	4:25
3.	"Puffer"	3:42
4.	"Cluster at CWM Einion"	1:35
5.	"London Planes"	1:22
6.	"It Was Willow"	2:01
7.	"I'm Rewinding It..."	4:15
8.	"Looking Through the Facets of a Plastic Jewel"	2:27
9.	"Wet Flakey Bark"	4:40
10.	"Bewley in Grey"	1:38
11.	"Teleidophonic Torch"	0:59
12.	"Puddled in the Morning"	3:01
13.	"At the Chase"	1:43
14.	"Cantaloup Carousel"	5:52
15.	"Lakeside"	3:37
16.	"Bewley in Red"	0:49
17.	"Poplar Avenue"	5:20
Total length:		49:24

2015 reissue
No.	Title	Length
17.	"Poplar Avenue - Uncut Version"	18:22
Total length:		1:02:26
