= My Autumn Empire =

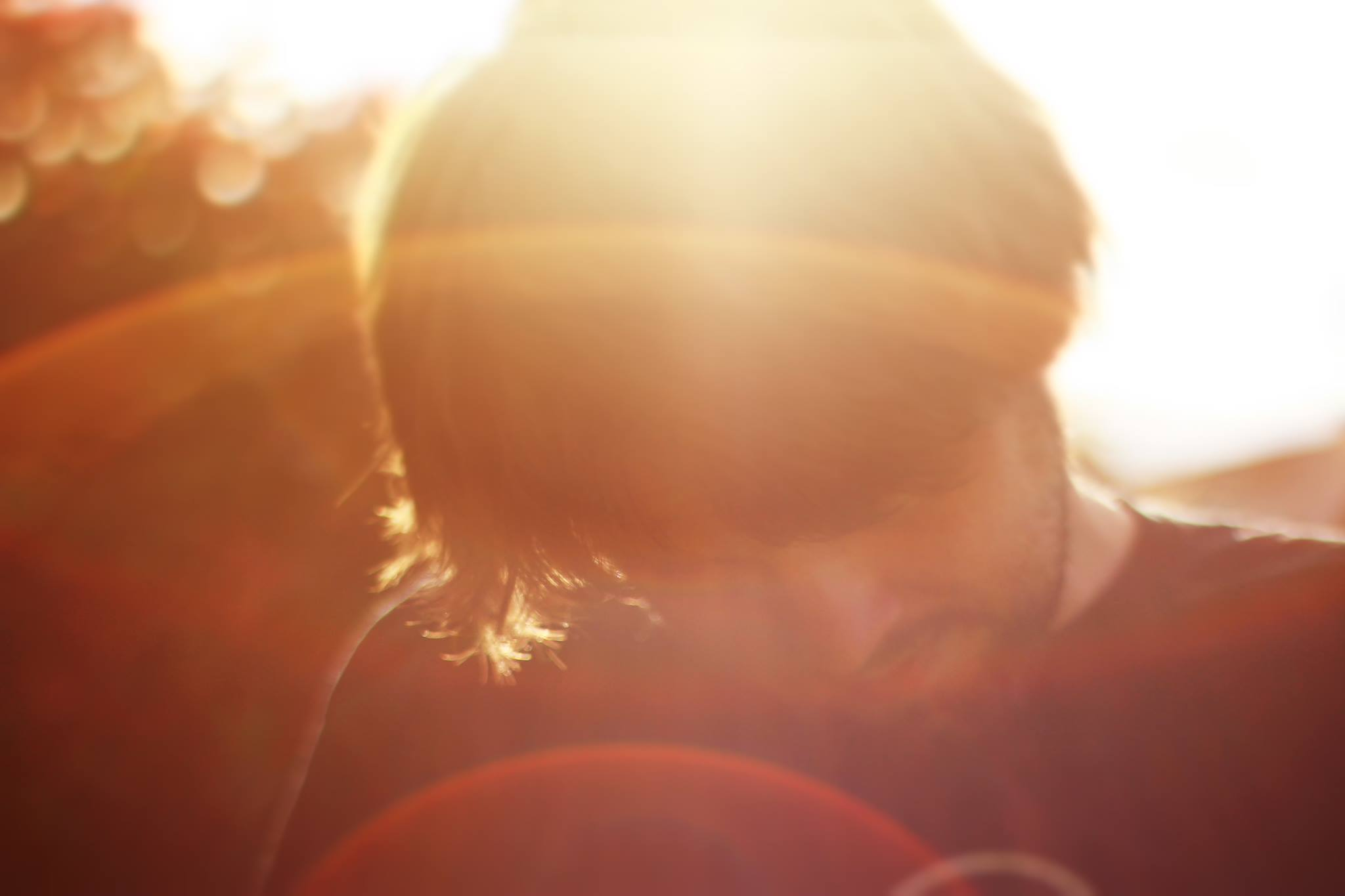

Background information
- Genres: Indie; Folk; Pop
- Years active: 2007–present
- Labels: Wayside & Woodland Recordings
- Members: Benjamin Holton
- Past members: Rob Glover; Eric Loveland Heath; Mike Rowley
- Website: www.myautumnempire.co.uk

My Autumn Empire is the solo work of Staffordshire based multi-instrumentalist and songwriter; Benjamin Holton of epic45, the project was started in 2007 after a limited run of releases were collected and distributed. To date My Autumn Empire has released five full studio albums; The Village Compass (2010) and II (2012) (pronounced "two"), The Visitation (2013), Dreams of Death and Other Favourites (2015) and "Oh, Leaking Universe" (2018) through Wayside & Woodland recordings.

The Village Compass, My Autumn Empire's first official release began life as indie-electronica remnants that were originally intended for use on epic45's album May Your Heart Be The Map. However the music of My Autumn Empire has since progressed and seeks to investigate a more melodic and harmonious form, referencing Holton's early exposure to folk and pop music largely attributed to musically gifted parents. Holton's work continues to be recorded and produced at home.

My Autumn Empire has utilised the same members as epic45 for live shows, including Rob Glover (epic45, Field Harmonics), Eric Loveland Heath (EL Heath) and Mike Rowley (Component#4)

== Wayside & Woodland Recordings ==
Following the success of indie imprint Make Mine Music (epic45, July Skies, Yellow 6) Benjamin Thomas Holton, along with his musical cohort Rob Glover, created the independent label Wayside & Woodland Recordings. After establishing distribution links in Japan, the US and support from the UK's own Norman Records - the label continues to grow with each release.
