= Letherette =

British electronic music production duo

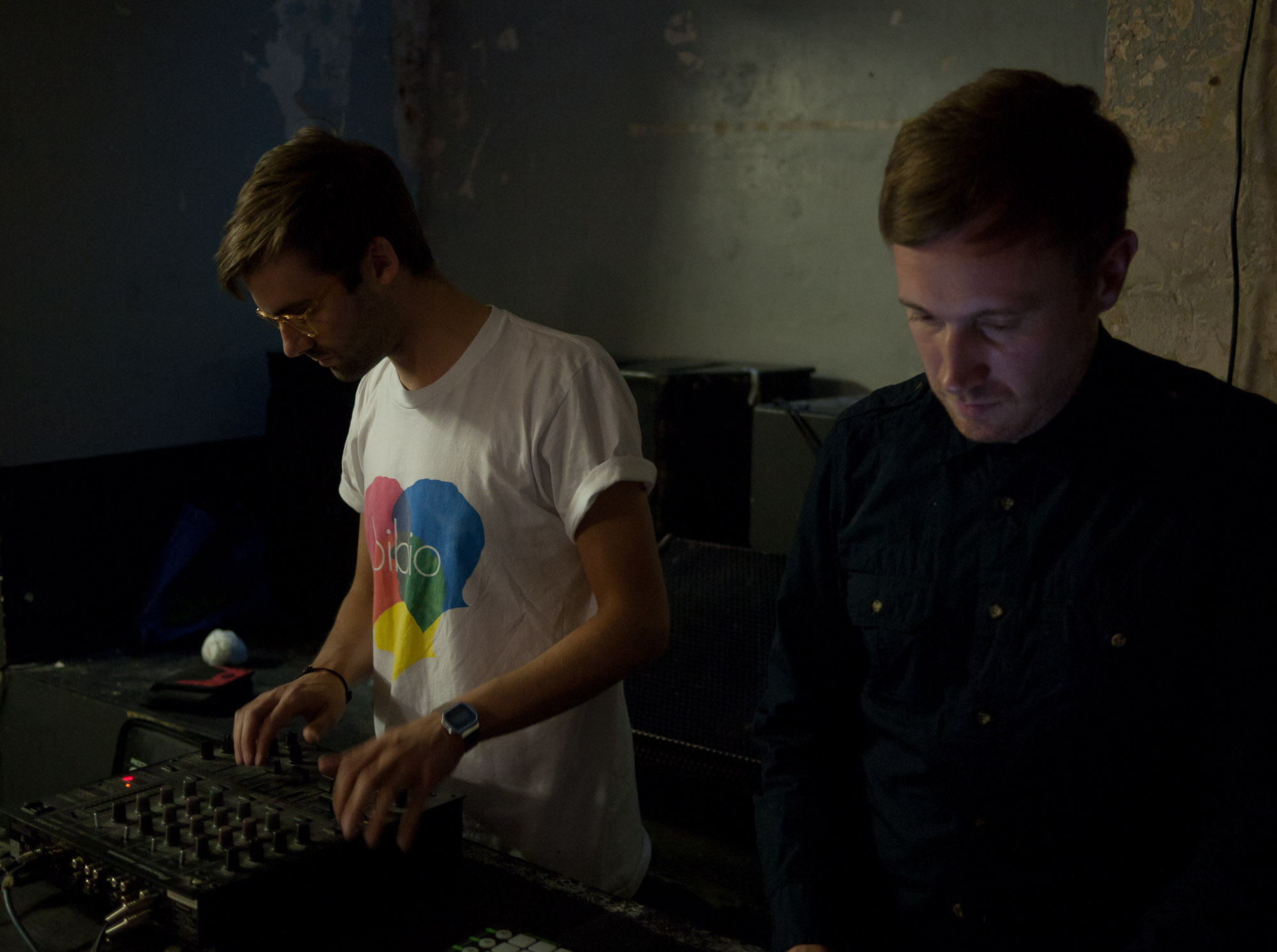
- Letherette soundcheck at Camp, London 2011

Background information
- Origin: Wolverhampton, UK
- Genres: Electronic; hip hop; house; dance
- Years active: 2009–present
- Labels: Ninja Tune
- Members: Richard Roberts; Andrew Harber

Letherette is an electronic music production duo, consisting of Richard Roberts and Andrew Harber. They released their debut album Letherette through their current label Ninja Tune in 2013, and have previously released material on Ho Tep Records.

== History ==
Friends from childhood, they grew up together in Wolverhampton, UK, where they are still based. The name of the act was originally the name of an old track by Andy, which the pair thought suited their music. They first came to note when they remixed Bibio's 'Lover's Carvings' for his album The Apple and the Tooth, released on Warp in 2009. Subsequently, they released two EPs on Eglo Records subsidiary Ho Tep. The pair provided a mixtape for BTS radio in 2010 which showcased some of their influences alongside a number of their own tracks. It became one of the most talked about and downloaded guest mixes of BTS radio that year. In 2012, they contributed a remix to the vinyl version of Bonobo's Black Sands Remixed album, and in the same year were signed by Ninja Tune Records. Their music has been played on BBC Radio 1 by Benji B and BBC Radio 6 Music by Lauren Laverne and Tom Ravenscroft.

== Style ==
Letherette's musical style often draws comparisons to Hip Hop artists (such as Madlib, J Dilla and MF Doom) and French House acts (like Daft Punk, Alan Braxe and Breakbot). Their musical production involves heavy use of sampling but also incorporates live instrumentation ranging from "guitars to synthesisers and various percussion instruments". In an interview with DJ Magazine they talk extensively about their use of sampling, including the comment "we've always loved the idea that you can take the naffest track imaginable [and] sample certain parts to transform it into something you think is amazing. It's like you uncover a secret, in a way. The track was always there within the details of the record, and you unlock it with sampling.". The pairs music is often described as playful and fun, with Souncrash stating "Fun is what sets Letherette apart", and Dazed & Confused saying that they "bound between sounds characteristic of Warp and Roule but do so with a metaphorical piña colada in their hands".

== Live ==
Describing their live-set in an Interview with The Independent they said "We use laptops with a couple of midi-controllers and a mixer. We just play, remix and rework tracks live. We take existing tracks and break them all down to their separate parts, then just semi improvise ways to play them with added effects and whatever else we decide to use on the night.".

They have supported Clark and Bibio, and performed with Bonobo, Gold Panda, Nosaj Thing, Illum Sphere and FaltyDL. As of 2013 they have being collaborating with Clayton Welham to create an immersive visual show.

Festival appearances have included MUTEK Montreal, the Bonobo Roundhouse Festival and Soundwave Croatia. They have also made two Boiler Room appearances.

== Discography ==
=== Album ===
==== Letherette ====
The pair released its debut full-length album on Ninja Tune on 15 April 2013. Juno Plus described the work as a "diverse re-envisioning of 80s pop, hip hop and filter house sounds" and "an essential summer album of the highest order". For the single D&T they created a video with the assistance of director Konx om Pax.

Track listing:

1. After Dawn
2. D&T
3. Restless (featuring Natasha Kmeto)
4. I Always Wanted You Back
5. The One
6. Gas Stations and Restaurants
7. Cold Clam
8. Warstones
9. Boosted
10. Space Cuts
11. Hard Martha
12. Say the Sun
13. Film Music (Bonus Track)
14. Olden Wing (Bonus Track for Japan)
15. D&T (Clark Remix)

=== EPs and singles ===
==== EP1 ====
Letherette's debut EP was released on Ho Tep in November 2010.

Track listing:

- A1. Ashtro
- A2. Dance Brace
- A3. Eye To Eye
- A4. Furth & Myre
- B1. In July Focus
- B2. Cherryade
- B3. Say Yeah
- B4. The Way

==== EP2 ====
Letherette's second EP on Ho Tep was EP2, released June 2011.

Track listing:

- A1. Bruse
- A2. In And Out
- A3. Shoo Be Doo
- B1. No Point
- B2. Yeah Yeah Love
- B3. Hold Close

==== Featurette ====
Featurette was Letherette's first EP on Ninja Tune, released in November 2012.

Track listing:

1. "Warstones"
2. Ettewards
3. Surface
4. Wecko

==== D&T ====
D&T was released on Ninja Tune in March 2013.

Track listing:

1. "D&T"
2. D&T (Clark remix)
3. D&T (Dorian Concept Remix)
4. D&T (The Invisible) Remix)
5. She Shines

==== After Dawn ====
After Dawn was released on Ninja Tune in August 2013. The lead was used in an advert for the Nokia Lumia 1020

Track listing:

1. "After Dawn"
2. Restless (feat. Natasha Kmeto) (Jimmy Edgar Remix)
3. After Dawn (Barker and Baumecker Remix)
4. After Dawn (Bibio Remix)
