= A Mineral Love =

Studio album by Bibio
- Released: 1 April 2016
- Genres: Experimental; indie pop; electronic; alternative R&B
- Length: 45:38
- Label: Warp Records
- Producer: Bibio

Bibio chronology
The Green EP (2014)	A Mineral Love (2016)	The Serious EP (2016)

Professional ratings
Aggregate scores
Source	Rating
Metacritic	77/100
Review scores
Source	Rating
AllMusic	4/5 stars
Clash	6/10
Consequence of Sound	B−
Exclaim!	5/10
Pitchfork Media	6.8/10
PopMatters	8/10 stars

A Mineral Love is the seventh studio album by electronic musician Bibio, his fourth studio release on Warp Records. It was released on 1 April 2016.

== Reception ==
At Metacritic, which assigns a weighted average score out of 100 to reviews from mainstream critics, A Mineral Love received an average score of 77% based on 11 reviews, indicating "generally favorable reviews".

== Track listing ==
No.	Title	Length
1.	"Petals"	2:32
2.	"A Mineral Love"	3:17
3.	"Raxeira"	2:52
4.	"Town & Country"	4:03
5.	"Feeling"	3:27
6.	"The Way You Talk" (featuring Gotye)	2:50
7.	"With the Thought of Us"	3:46
8.	"Why So Serious?" (featuring Olivier St. Louis)	4:46
9.	"C'est La Vie"	3:31
10.	"Wren Tails"	1:34
11.	"Gasoline & Mirrors" (featuring Wax Stag)	5:43
12.	"Saint Thomas"	3:39
13.	"Light Up the Sky"	3:38

Japanese edition bonus track
No.	Title	Length
14.	"Pretty Girls"	4:45

== Charts ==
Chart	Peak position
US Top Dance/Electronic Albums (Billboard)	9
