= The Apple and the Tooth =

Studio album by Bibio
- Released: 9 November 2009
- Recorded: 2009
- Genre: Electronica
- Length: 46:40
- Label: Warp
- Producer: Stephen Wilkinson

Bibio chronology
Ambivalence Avenue (2009)	The Apple and the Tooth (2009)	Mind Bokeh (2011)

Professional ratings
Review scores
Source	Rating
AllMusic	3.5/5 stars
Pitchfork Media	6.2/10
Popmatters	7/10 stars

The Apple and the Tooth is an album by Bibio. It is his third album of 2009, and his second album on Warp Records. The release comprises four new tracks and eight remixes of tracks from Ambivalence Avenue. Remixers include Clark, Wax Stag, Eskmo, The Gentleman Losers, and Lone, as well as Bibio himself.

== Track listing ==
All tracks are written by Stephen Wilkinson

No.	Title	Length
1.	"The Apple and the Tooth"	2:18
2.	"Rotten Rudd"	2:24
3.	"Bones & Skulls"	4:09
4.	"Steal the Lamp"	2:42
5.	"S'vive (Clark remix)"	3:51
6.	"Sugarette (Wax Stag remix)"	6:19
7.	"Dwrcan (Eskmo remix)"	4:24
8.	"Lovers' Carvings (Letherette remix)"	2:47
9.	"Haikuesque (The Gentleman Losers' Whispers in the Rain mix)"	3:46
10.	"All the Flowers (Lone remix)"	4:28
11.	"Fire Ant (Keaver & Brause remix)"	5:06
12.	"The Palm of Your Wave (Bibio remix)"	4:26
Total length:		46:40
