= Epic45 =

epic45
- Genres: Indie; Post-rock
- Years active: 1995–present
- Labels: Where Are My Records; Make Mine Music; Wayside and Woodland Recordings
- Members: Rob Glover; Ben Holton; James Yates
- Website: epic45.com

epic45 are a British indie/post-rock band. Core members Rob Glover and Benjamin Holton who grew up in Wheaton Aston, Staffordshire, formed the band in 1995 when the two school friends were only 13 years old. They have released albums on various labels, including Where Are My Records, Make Mine Music, Wayback, and their own Woodland Recordings label.

== Side projects ==
Holton has released three albums under the name My Autumn Empire (The Village Compass, 2010 ii, 2012 and The Visitation, 2014). Glover also records as The Toy Library and Field Harmonics (Walls, 2013).

== Discography ==
=== Studio albums ===
- Secrets, Signs and Threats (2001)
- Reckless Engineers (2002)
- Against the Pull of Autumn (2004)
- Slides (2004)
- May Your Heart Be the Map (2007)
- Steps to Further Winter (2009)
- In All the Empty Houses (2009)
- Weathering (2011)
- Weathered (2012)
- Through Broken Summer (2018)
- Cropping The Aftermath (2020)

=== EPs ===
- England Fallen Over EP (2005)
- Drakelow EP (2006)
- Fragments #3 (2012)
- Monument EP (2014)
