= Vignetting the Compost =

Studio album by Bibio
- Released: 3 February 2009
- Genre: Folktronica
- Length: 64:52
- Label: Mush (US); And Records (Japan)
- Producer: Stephen Wilkinson

Bibio chronology
Hand Cranked (2006)	Vignetting the Compost (2009)	Ambivalence Avenue (2009)

Professional ratings
Review scores
Source	Rating
AllMusic	4/5 stars
Pitchfork Media	6.8/10

Vignetting the Compost is an album by Bibio, released on 3 February 2009 on Mush Records in the United States and on 4 March 2009 on And Records, an imprint of Youth Inc.

== Track listing ==
All tracks are written by Stephen Wilkinson

No.	Title	Length
1.	"Flesh Rots, Pip Sown"	4:24
2.	"Mr and Mrs Compost"	1:26
3.	"Everglad Everglade"	1:08
4.	"Dopplerton"	4:34
5.	"Great Are the Piths"	2:38
6.	"Odd Paws"	2:32
7.	"Under the Pier"	4:08
8.	"Weekend Wildfire"	5:09
9.	"The Clothesline and the Silver Birch"	2:04
10.	"Torn Under the Window Light"	2:06
11.	"The Ephemeral Bluebell"	5:45
12.	"Over the Far and Hills Away"	1:06
13.	"Amongst the Bark and Fungus"	6:04
14.	"Top Soil"	2:34
15.	"Thatched"	4:11
16.	"The Garden Shelter" (ends at 5:41; hidden track starts at 11:01)	15:04
Total length:		64:52

Japanese edition bonus track
No.	Title	Length
17.	"Chasing the Snowbird"	3:30
Total length:		68:22
