= Patten (musician) =

- Born: Damien Roach
- Origin: London, England
- Genres: Electronic, experimental
- Years active: 2006–present
- Labels: 555-5555, Warp Records, No Pain in Pop, Kaleidoscope
- Website: www.patttten.com

Patten (stylised in lowercase) is the pseudonym of London-based electronic experimental musician and audiovisual artist Damien Roach.

== Music ==
Patten began as an electronic music project by Roach under the pseudonym D. While running a record label called Kaleidoscope, he had released music on CD-Rs since 2006.

The first official Patten LP Glaqjo Xaacsso was released in September 2011 through the UK label No Pain in Pop.

In November 2013 Roach signed to Warp Records, releasing the Eolian Instate EP soon after in an edition of 500 12" picture discs, with artwork by frequent visual collaborator Jane Eastlight (revealed in 2022 via social media by patten to be another pseudonym).

February 2014 saw the release of the first LP for Warp, entitled Estoile Naiant. In addition to the LP, 2014 saw Roach release a number of free remixes of music by other artists on his website, called re-edits.

In the summer of 2014, Roach began to organise musical events at Power Lunches under the moniker 555-5555. The lineups featured sets from artists such as Logos, Karen Gwyer, Slackk, SFV Acid, Darkstar, Visionist, Fotomachine and Max Tundra.

In collaboration with Hisham Bharoocha, Patten contributed to Doug Aitken's "Station to Station" project, recording an EP of new music created from found sound and improvised percussion onsite at the Barbican Centre.

Furthermore, Patten has created several remixes for artists like Giorgio Moroder and Björk.

In September 2016, Patten's third album Ψ was released with the vocals of a member known as A featuring across the record.

In May 2017, Patten released Requiem, a four track digital-only EP, launched with a live audiovisual show at London's Institute of Contemporary Arts.

September 2019 saw the album Flex released on Patten's 555-5555 imprint, followed by a run of live audiovisual concerts and DJ sets across Europe.

In 2020 three Patten albums appeared in quick succession, starting with the beatless album Glow released in July during the early days of the COVID-19 pandemic. This was followed in August by Glo))), a heavy metal-inspired alternative version of the previous album. Aegis, the third album of 2020 was released in October, featuring ten tracks of experimental techno.

Fact magazine published a mini-documentary on Patten's history in August 2020.

Two EPs followed, Burner in 2021 with the track "Eat Smoke" (featuring Antipop Consortium's Beans (rapper)), and 2022's Desire Path EP, making Bleep's Tracks Of The Year with the track "Kiss U".

In January 2023, Patten announced Mirage FM, an album made using text-to-audio AI samples, due for release on April 14, 2023, via 555-5555.

== Other projects ==
In November 2017, the 555-5555 agency created a commissioned line of apparel for Dummy magazine.

In June 2018, Roach created an online discussion forum, also named 555-5555.

Roach has created several audiovisual installations. In January 2018 a Patten installation titled 3049 premiered at Tenderpixel gallery in London. The audiovisual installation "CB-MMXVIII (I’ve been thinking of giving sleeping lessons)" was commissioned and exhibited in December 2018 by Somerset House in London for the Claire Catterall curated exhibition Good Grief, on the enduring influence of Charles Schulz and Peanuts.

In 2022, Roach was commissioned by Flat Time House to compose a soundtrack for Boyle Family's 1960s film Beyond Image. The soundtrack was exhibited in a group exhibition called "Gone Fishing", alongside works by John Latham, Marlie Mul, and Boyle Family. The soundtrack was performed live by Patten at Peckham Audio in the summer of 2022.

Making creative direction and design under the moniker 555-5555 since 2015, Roach has made numerous projects including the visual world behind Dan Snaith's Jiaolong label and Daphni releases, the visual identity and design for Nathan Fake's Blizzards album, and the live visual show for Caribou's Suddenly album tour.

== Partial discography ==
=== Albums ===
- GLAQJO XAACSSO, No Pain in Pop, 2011
- Estoile Naiant, Warp, 2014. A limited number included a bonus CD of side A from the Patten cassette tape Ship of Theseus (vol ii).
- Ψ, Warp, 2016
- Flex, 555-5555, 2019
- Glow, 555-5555, 2020
- GLO))), 555-5555, 2020
- Aegis, 555-5555, 2020
- Mirage FM, 555-5555, 2023

=== EPs ===
- Eolian Instate, Warp, 2013. Limited to 500 copies.
- Hisham Bharoocha & patten: June 30th, Vinyl Factory, 2015. Limited to 300 copies.
- Requiem, Warp, 2017.
- Burner, 555-5555, 2021.
- Desire Path, 555-5555, 2022. .

=== Cassettes ===
- Ship of Theseus (Vol II), Warp Records, 2014

=== Soundtracks (released) ===
- 3049 (Original Film Soundtrack), 555-5555, 2021

=== Re-edits ===
- Re-edits vol. 3, Not on label, 2014
- Re-edits vol. 1, Not on label, 2014
- Re-edits vol. 8, Not on label, 2014
- Re-edits vol. 17, Not on label, 2014
- Re-edits vol. 2, Not on label, 2016
- Re-edits vol. 9, 555-5555, 2018
- Re-edits: 54D3, 555-5555, 2020
- Re-edits: XM45, 555-5555, 2020

=== Selected remixes ===
- My Love Is The Best, Alak, Not On Label, 2011
- Hey Sparrow, Peaking Lights, Remixes, Weird World, 2011
- Two AM, Hauschka, Salon Des Amateurs Remixes, FatCat, 2012
- Keep It Low, The Hundred In The Hands, Keep It Low, Warp, 2012
- Most Of Missing, Orphan, Re:, Kaleidoscope, 2013
- Remember, Jon Hassell, Remixes 12", All Saints, 2014
- Mandan, Harold Budd, ARemixes 12", All Saints, 2014
- Silent Ascent, Downliners Sekt, Silent Ascent Remixes, Infiné, 2014
- Exxus, Glass Animals, ZABA, Wolf Tone, 2014
- Purplehands, Kwes., ilpix., Warp, 2014
- Metal Fatigue, Jon Hassell, City: Works Of Fiction, All Saints, 2014
- Stonemilker, Björk, One Little Indian, 2015
- Delta Antliae, Georgio Moroder and Raney Shokne, Tron Run/r (OST), Sumthing Else Music Works, 2016
- Falling Into Me, Let's Eat Grandma, Transgressive, 2018
- bEra, J Colleran, Because Music, 2018

=== CD-Rs ===
- Lacuna, Not on label, 2006
- There were Horizons, Kaleidoscope, 2007
- Sketching the Tesseract, Kaleidoscope, 2008
- EDITS, No Pain In Pop, 2011
- Ship of Theseus (Vol II): Side A, Warp Records, 2014

=== Early downloads ===
- '09 tst2, Not on label, 2009
- '09 tst, Not on label, 2009

=== Other known aliases ===
- Actual Magic: Welcome to Today, Kaleidoscope, 2016
