= Evaporator (album) =

Studio album by Nathan Fake
- Released: 20 February 2026
- Recorded: 2024
- Genre: Electronic
- Length: 41:51
- Label: InFiné
- Producer: Nathan Fake

Nathan Fake chronology
Crystal Vision (2023)	Evaporator (2026)

Singles from Evaporator
- 1. "Hypercube" Released: 18 March 2025; 2. "Bialystok / The Ice House" Released: 20 November 2025; 3. "Slow Yamaha" Released: 6 January 2026

Evaporator is the seventh studio album by English electronic musician Nathan Fake. It was released on 20 February 2026 through InFiné, his first release on the label. Recorded during the summer of 2024, the album marks a shift toward a warmer, more atmospheric sound and features collaborations with Clark and Dextro. Evaporator was released twenty years after Fake's debut Drowning in a Sea of Love (2006) and received positive reviews from critics.

== Background ==
Fake recorded Evaporator during an unusually warm summer in 2024 in the United Kingdom, a period he described as particularly productive. He continued to use Cubase VST5, the same digital audio workstation he had relied on since his earliest work, alongside the Korg Prophecy synthesiser that had featured prominently on Providence (2017). Fake described the album as a deliberate move toward "airy daytime music", contrasting with the more nocturnal tone of much of his earlier output.

The album features two collaborations. "Orbiting Meadows" was co-composed with Clark, built around a microtonal piano part, and takes its title from the space cemetery in the animated series Futurama. "Baltasound" was co-composed with Dextro (Ewan Mackenzie, the drummer from Pigs Pigs Pigs Pigs Pigs Pigs Pigs), who contributed processed guitars and textures recorded during a session in Newcastle.

Some of the album's sounds originated as demos for the "Digital Memory" sample pack Fake created for Spitfire Audio's LABS series, with the track "Hypercube" released as a single in March 2025 before the album was announced. The album's cover art is the first in Fake's discography to feature his face, which Spectrum Culture noted as reflecting a "newfound openness" from the self-described shy musician.

== Critical reception ==
Professional ratings
Review scores
Source	Rating
Pitchfork	6.9/10
Sound of Violence	3.5/5 stars
Spectrum Culture	80/100
Télérama	TTT

Evaporator received positive reviews. Pitchfork gave the album 6.9 out of 10. Spectrum Culture rated the album 80 out of 100, calling it Fake's "most straight-shooting effort" since Drowning in a Sea of Love and his "most evocative and direct" work to date, noting a common thread of airiness across its varied textures and drawing comparisons to Jon Hopkins, Burial and Caribou. Writing for Cyclic Defrost, Ruth Bailey called the album a deeply focused work that reframes rather than revisits Fake's past, praising its brightness and the balance between quiet moments and more energetic passages. A Closer Listen described the album as Fake emerging with a renewed sense of purpose, noting its success in combining the ambient-electronic character of his earlier work with contemporary production. French publication Sound of Violence praised the album's oscillation between tension and release, describing it as a controlled and masterful work that balances atmospheric passages with more immediate tracks. Télérama rated the album TTT, comparing its enveloping sound to the Cure's "All Cats Are Grey" and calling it "an album for old ravers who no longer go to raves but have kept the penetrating memory of them".

== Track listing ==
All tracks are written by Nathan Fake, except where noted.

Evaporator track listing
No.	Title	Writer(s)	Length
1.	"Aiwa"		4:56
2.	"Hypercube"		4:52
3.	"Yucon"		2:49
4.	"Bialystok"		4:29
5.	"The Ice House"		1:24
6.	"Sunlight On Saturn"		3:13
7.	"You'll Find a Way"		3:15
8.	"Baltasound" (featuring Dextro)	Nathan Fake, Ewan Mackenzie	4:37
9.	"Orbiting Meadows" (featuring Clark)	Nathan Fake, Clark	2:05
10.	"Slow Yamaha"		9:00
11.	"Black Drift" (Outro)		1:11

== Personnel ==
- Nathan Fake – production, all instruments (except where noted)
- Clark – co-composition and performance on "Orbiting Meadows"
- Dextro (Ewan Mackenzie) – co-composition and performance on "Baltasound"
- Lorenzo Targhetta – mastering

== Charts ==
Chart performance for Evaporator
Chart (2026)	Peak position
UK Album Downloads (OCC)	26
