= Crystal Vision =

Studio album by Nathan Fake
- Released: 7 April 2023
- Genre: Electronic
- Length: 57:19
- Label: Cambria Instruments
- Producer: Nathan Fake

Nathan Fake chronology
Blizzards (2020)	Crystal Vision (2023)	Evaporator (2026)

Singles from Crystal Vision
- 1. "The Grass" Released: 22 February 2023; 2. "Vimana" Released: 14 March 2023

Crystal Vision is the sixth studio album by English electronic musician Nathan Fake. It was released on 7 April 2023 through Cambria Instruments, Fake's own label co-founded with Wesley Matsell. The album features collaborations with Clark and Wizard Apprentice, and was preceded by the singles "The Grass" and "Vimana". Crystal Vision received generally positive reviews from music critics.

== Background ==
Following his fifth album Blizzards (2020), which was largely recorded live in one take, Fake took a different approach for Crystal Vision, aiming for a more refined and accessible sound. He described the album as "music for music's sake – recorded without angles, agendas and themes". The album title unintentionally echoes Fleetwood Mac; Fake attributed this to a subconscious influence from his father singing their lyrics during his childhood, noting that his debut album Drowning in a Sea of Love had similarly echoed one of the band's songs.

Fake built several tracks around specific creative constraints. "Boss Core" was constructed using sounds from a Boss DR-550 drum machine, challenging himself to make the rudimentary sounds compelling. "AMEN 96" was an experiment in reworking the amen break, a staple of jungle and drum and bass. The collaboration with Wizard Apprentice on "The Grass" came about after Fake heard their track "I Am Invisible". The closing track "Outsider" features Clark.

== Critical reception ==
Professional ratings
Review scores
Source	Rating
Pitchfork	7.6/10
musicOMH	3/5 stars

Crystal Vision received generally positive reviews from music critics. Philip Sherburne of Pitchfork gave the album a 7.6, writing that while Fake pays direct homage to his inspirations, the results maintain his distinctive sound. James Sherwood of The Quietus described the album as a love letter to Fake's musical roots, praising its sense of community and connectedness. Inverted Audio called it a "return to form", noting its purposeful direction and playful approach to genre. Ben Hogwood of Arcana called it a formidable addition to Fake's discography, praising its bold colours and rewarding energy. Ben Devlin of musicOMH gave a more mixed assessment, praising tracks such as "AMEN 96" and the title track but finding that some of the album's nostalgia-driven approach occasionally faltered.

== Track listing ==
Crystal Vision track listing
No.	Title	Length
1.	"Arrival"	0:53
2.	"The Grass" (feat. Wizard Apprentice)	6:16
3.	"Vimana"	5:10
4.	"Boss Core"	7:19
5.	"Crystal Vision"	6:50
6.	"CMD"	3:14
7.	"Bibled"	8:01
8.	"Hawk"	6:31
9.	"AMEN 96"	5:24
10.	"Outsider" (feat. Clark)	7:41

== Personnel ==
- Nathan Fake – production, all instruments
- Wizard Apprentice – vocals on "The Grass"
- Clark – collaboration on "Outsider"
- Infinite Vibes – artwork
- Guy Davie – mastering at Electric Mastering
