= Creaked Records =

Swiss independent record label

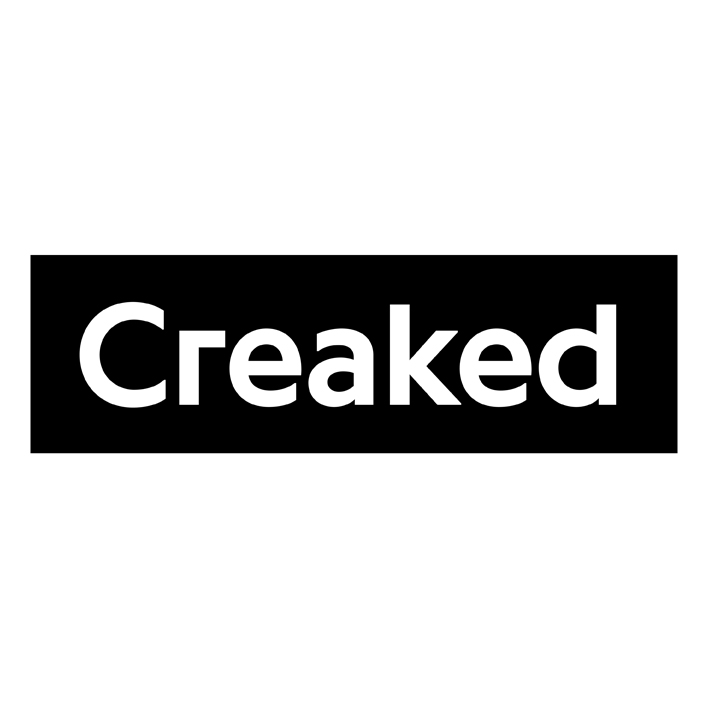
- Founded: 2004
- Founder: Léo Wannaz
- Genre: Indie pop; Experimental; Glitch; Techno; Electronic
- Country of origin: Switzerland
- Location: Lausanne
- Official website: https://www.creakedrecords.com

Creaked Records, also known as Creaked, is a Swiss independent record label based in Lausanne. Chief artists include Larytta, Starting Teeth, Consor, OY, Gaspard de La Montagne, Julien Aubert, Isolated Lines, La Vie C'est Facile, Sutekh, Verveine and My Panda Shall Fly.

== History ==
Founded in 2004, by Léo Wannaz in Lausanne, Switzerland, Creaked Records has grown from a neighborhood laboratory known for its acumen in the area of pop, experimental and techno into an internationally recognized platform for visual artists, designers and musicians.

The label has organized two largest events in its hometown, the Creaked Weekender in 2009 for its 5th birthday and the Love and 8 festival in 2012 at Le Bourg, Le Romandie, La Ruche and La Datcha.

2014 was the label's 10th anniversary. There were a bunch of new releases and signing artists, as well as two compilation albums featuring its artists: Remodeled & Reworked Vol. 1 and Remodeled & Reworked Vol. 2.

Creaked Records’ current roster is eclectic, and its alumni are many. A broad list of its label's artistry ranges from Larytta to Gaspard de La Montagne to La Vie C’est Facile. Somewhere in between or off to the side are Consor, Isolated Lines, Julien Aubert, Grace Core, Verveine or My Panda Shall Fly and Sutekh. Collaborations have included many such as OY, Venetian Snares, Dam Mantle, Nathan Fake, Opak, Scuba, Alog, Mike Slott, Starting Teeth and numerous others that gave the label increasing credibility.

== Roster ==
- All Automatic Wash
- Alog
- Bloodysnowman
- Buvette
- Consor
- Cosili
- Dam Mantle
- Gaspard de La Montagne
- Grace Core
- Gregorythme
- Isolated Lines
- Joe Galen
- Jules Chaz
- Julien Aubert
- Kylmyys
- La Vie C'est Facile
- Larytta
- Mochipet
- My Panda Shall Fly
- Opak
- OY
- pOnk
- Starting Teeth
- Sutekh
- Tidy Kid
- TUN
- Verveine
