= Sutekh =

Sutekh may refer to:

- Set (deity) or Sutekh, an ancient Egyptian deity
- Sutekh (musician), a music composer and performer of experimental electronic and techno music
- Sutekh, a recurring villain from the science fiction television series Doctor Who, first appearing in Pyramids of Mars (1975)
