= Steam Days (album) =

Studio album by Nathan Fake
- Released: 3 September 2012
- Genre: Electronic
- Length: 48:50
- Label: Border Community
- Producer: Nathan Fake

Nathan Fake chronology
Hard Islands (2009)	Steam Days (2012)	Providence (2017)

Singles from Steam Days
- 1. "Iceni Strings" Released: 2012

Steam Days is the third studio album by English electronic musician Nathan Fake. It was released on 3 September 2012 through Border Community, the label run by James Holden. The album followed extensive touring in support of his second album Hard Islands (2009), and Fake described the creative process as involving a longer gestation period and a more intuitive, isolated working method. Steam Days received generally favourable reviews, with a score of 67 out of 100 on Metacritic.

== Background ==
After touring extensively behind Hard Islands, Fake took a longer creative approach for Steam Days, with many of the album's tracks running substantially longer than those on its predecessor. He worked in isolation using simple instruments, a process he likened to a folk ethic, and cited his live performances as having made the music less rigid and more fluid. Fake noted that he avoided listening to other music while composing to prevent outside influences from affecting the work.

Several track titles reflect Fake's Norfolk roots. "Paean" derives from an anagram of his full name, shortened from the phrase "A Paean Thankful". "Iceni Strings", released as the album's lead single, references the Iceni, the ancient Celtic tribe from the region; Fake felt the track's melody evoked ancient folk music and had what he described as a tribal, campfire quality.

== Critical reception ==
Professional ratings
Aggregate scores
Source	Rating
Metacritic	67/100
Review scores
Source	Rating
Pitchfork	6.2/10
The Skinny	4/5 stars
The Line of Best Fit	6/10

Steam Days received generally favourable reviews. At Metacritic, which assigns a normalised rating out of 100 to reviews from mainstream publications, the album received an average score of 67, based on 13 reviews.

Writing for FACT, Alex Macpherson called the album Fake's most dynamic long-form work, praising the integration of organic and electronic sounds, though finding the closing tracks uneven. Resident Advisor described the album as a return to the melodic, atmospheric sound of Fake's earlier work, noting the influence of British techno and ambient house from the early to mid-1990s. The Skinny gave the album four out of five stars, highlighting its emotional depth and describing it as a journey through introspective electronic soundscapes. Exclaim! considered it Fake's strongest release, praising the synthesis of ambient textures with a progressive sound.

More mixed assessments came from Mark Pytlik of Pitchfork, who gave the album 6.2 out of 10 and characterised it as a synthesis of the melodic approach of Drowning in a Sea of Love and the harder rhythms of Hard Islands, acknowledging it as possibly Fake's most balanced work while questioning the ongoing relevance of the genre. The Line of Best Fit praised tracks such as "Iceni Strings" and "Paean" as examples of Fake's distinctive style but found the album as a whole lacking in variety. XLR8R similarly noted that while individual tracks were accomplished, the album struggled to cohere as a unified statement.

== Track listing ==
All tracks are written by Nathan Fake.

Steam Days track listing
No.	Title	Length
1.	"Paean"	3:53
2.	"Cascade Airways"	2:43
3.	"Iceni Strings"	5:29
4.	"Old Light"	3:07
5.	"Harnser"	4:32
6.	"World Of Spectrum"	3:49
7.	"Rue"	3:48
8.	"Sad Vember"	3:53
9.	"Neketona"	3:53
10.	"Glow Hole"	7:56
11.	"Warble Epics"	5:47

== Personnel ==
- Nathan Fake – production, all instruments
