= Necton =

Village in Norfolk, England

Coordinates: 52.65°N 0.775°E

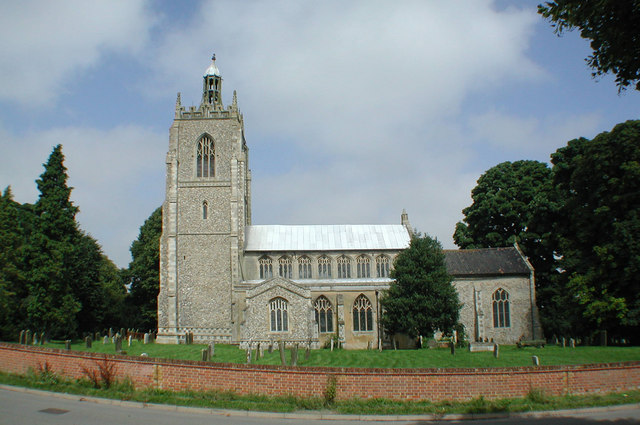
- All Saints', Necton

- Location within Norfolk
- Area: 15.48 km^{2} (5.98 sq mi)
- Population: 1,923 UK census 2011
  - Density: 124/km^{2} (320/sq mi)
- OS grid reference: TF878094
- District: Breckland
- Shire county: Norfolk
- Region: East
- Country: England
- Sovereign state: United Kingdom
- Post town: Swaffham
- Postcode district: PE37
- Dialling code: 01760
- Police: Norfolk
- Fire: Norfolk
- Ambulance: East of England
- UK Parliament: South West Norfolk

Necton is a village situated on a turning off the A47 main road between Swaffham and East Dereham in the Breckland district of Norfolk, England. As at the 2001 census it had a population of 1,865 residents and an area of 15.48 km^{2} (5.98 sq mi), increasing to a population of 1,923 at the 2011 census. It has a number of facilities including a primary school, playing field, social club, pub, post office a shop, a butcher's and an Asda Express fuel station at the top of the village along the A47.

== Correct pronunciation ==
"Nayton"

== History ==
The place name "Necton" is first attested in the Domesday Book of 1086, where it appears as Nechetuna and Neketuna. The name means "town or settlement by a neck of land" (Necton is situated at the foot of a ridge).

All Saints' church, dating from the 14th century, although its tower was rebuilt in the 19th century, is at the centre of the village in the Benefice of Necton. It is a grade I listed building. One of its main attractions is the hammerbeam and archbraced nave roof with its carved angels.

In the churchyard is a 14th-century grade II* listed table tomb reputed to be that of the Countess of Warwick.

There is an old mill dating back to 1782 that was in full working order until the 1960s. Necton tower mill had been converted into a single-storey dwelling with a flat roof by 1970, and it is presently a retail facility.

Necton Diner was a filming location for the locally-set film The Goob (2014). An electricity substation planned in the parish is seen as vital to the harnessing of offshore wind-generated power, connecting turbines in the North Sea to the National Grid.

== Notable residents ==
- Nathan Fake, electronic musician, grew up in the village.

== Gallery ==
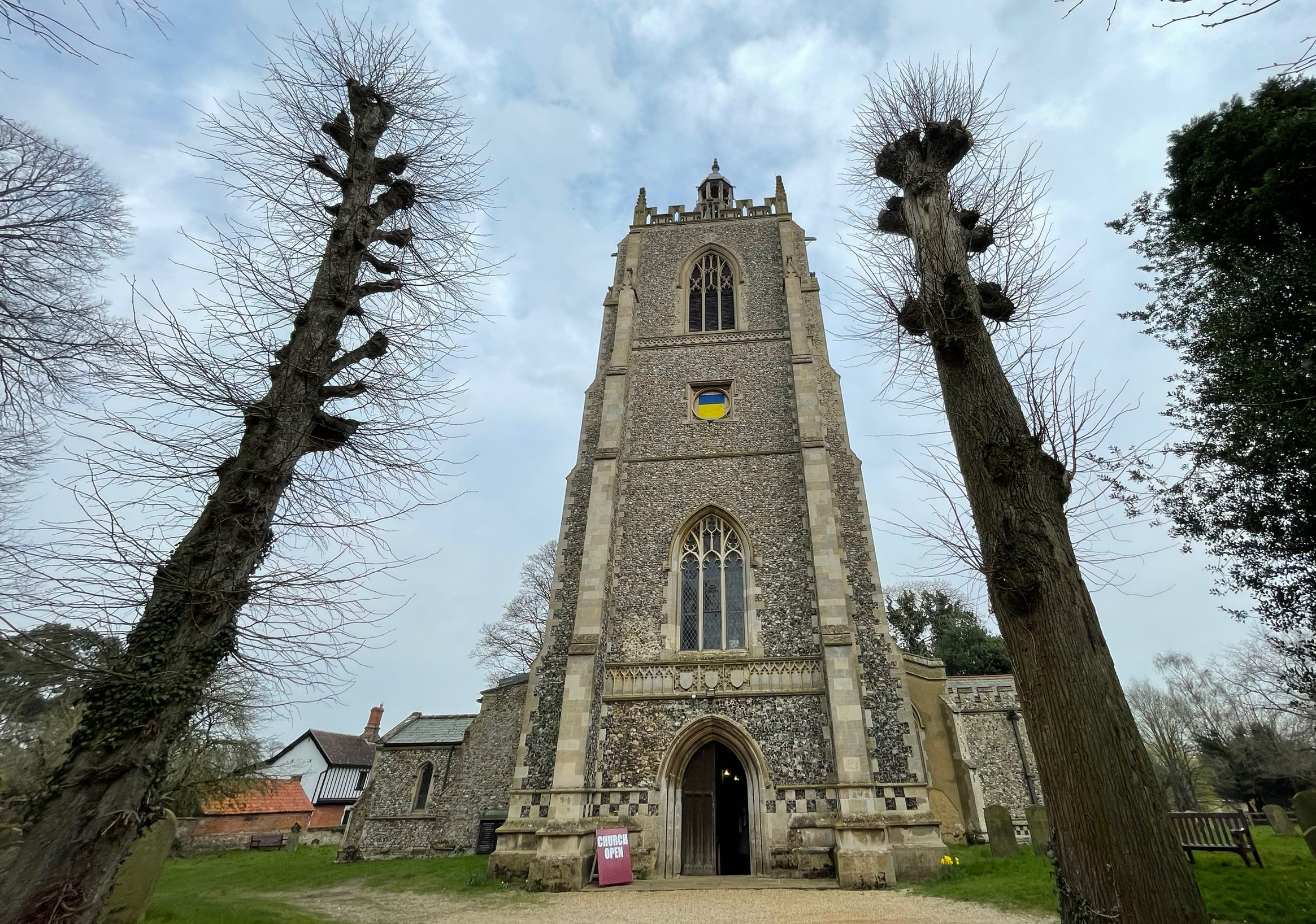
All Saints tower, Necton - without the clock, sent for repairs (2022)

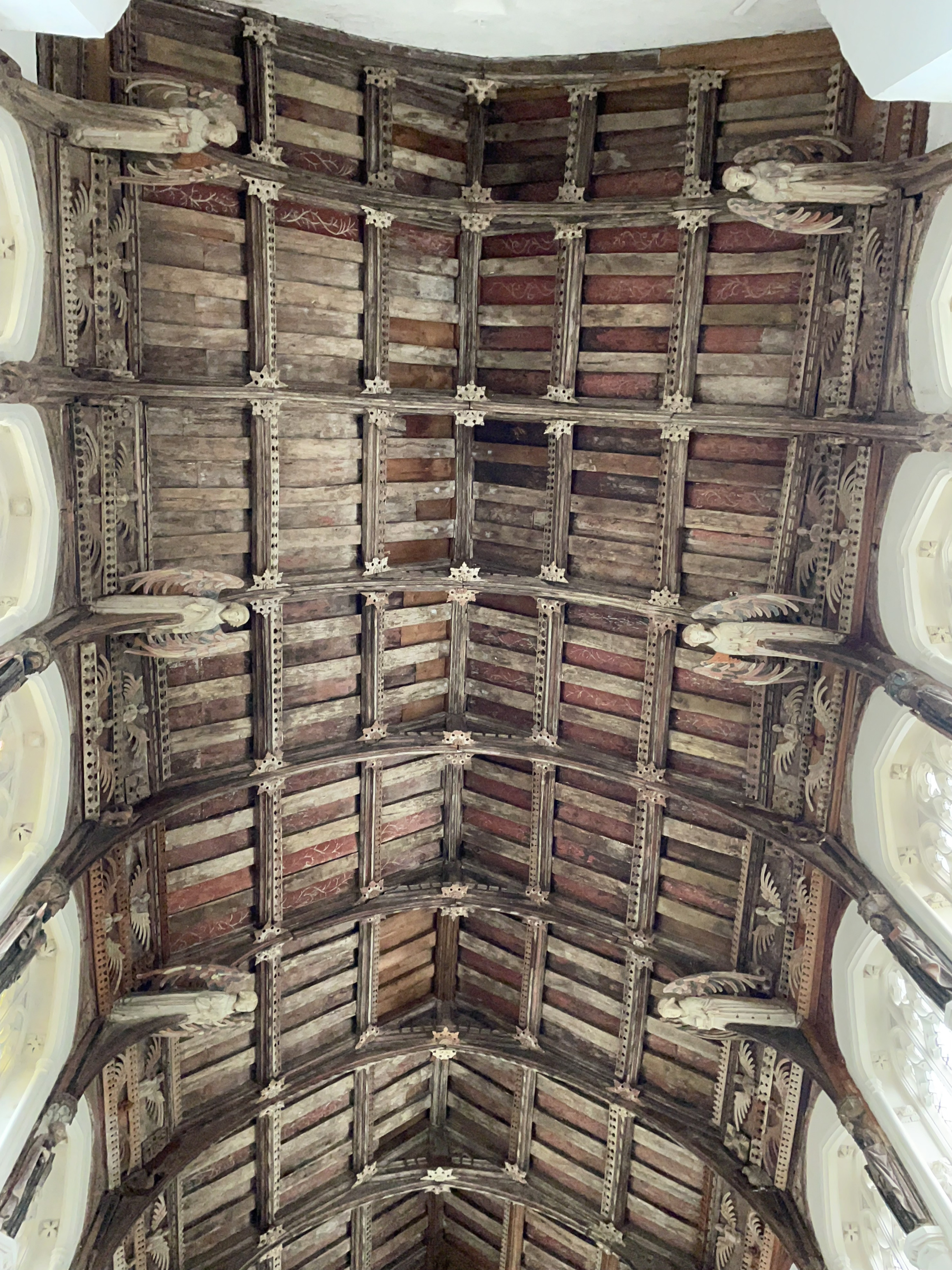
The angel roof at All Saints

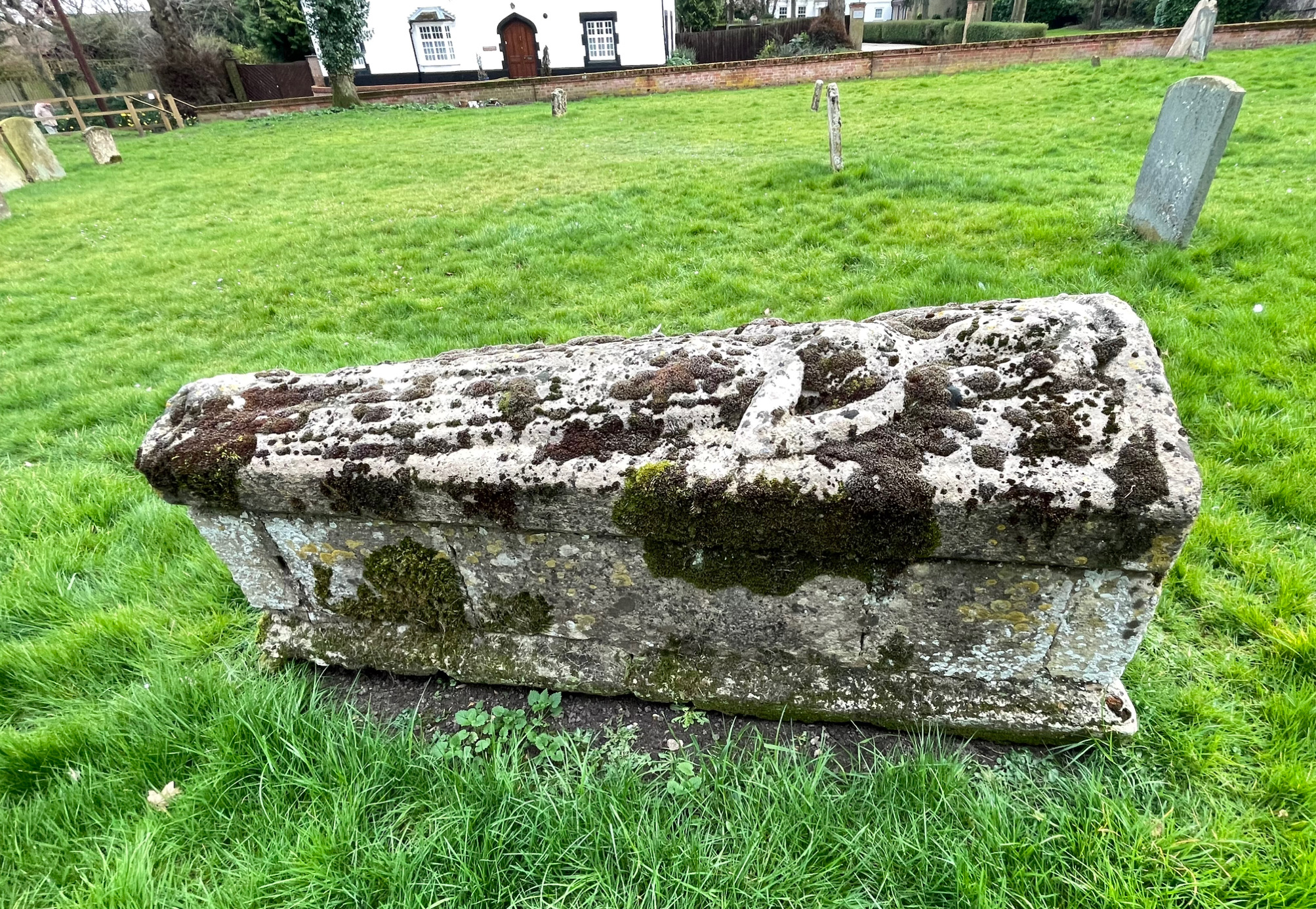
14th century table tomb
