= Estoile Naiant =

Studio album by Patten
- Released: 24 February 2014
- Genre: Experimental, electronic
- Length: 42:05
- Label: Warp Records

Patten chronology
Eolian Instate (2013)	Estoile Naiant (2014)

Professional ratings
Aggregate scores
Source	Rating
Metacritic	65/100
Review scores
Source	Rating
Sputnikmusic	4/5 stars
AllMusic	3/5 stars
MusicOMH	7/10

Estoile Naiant is an album by the electronic artist Patten. It was released in 2014 by Warp Records. The album followed the 2013 EP Eolian Instate and was the first patten LP since the 2011 record GLAQJO XAACSSO, released by No Pain in Pop.

== Track listing ==
No.	Title	Length
1.	"Gold arc"	5:17
2.	"Here always"	3:00
3.	"Drift"	4:26
4.	"Winter strobing"	5:41
5.	"Softer"	3:11
6.	"Pathways"	3:52
7.	"23-45"	4:19
8.	"Key embedded"	6:15
9.	"Agen"	4:27
10.	"LL2"	1:37
