= Nathan Fake =

English electronic music artist (born 1983)

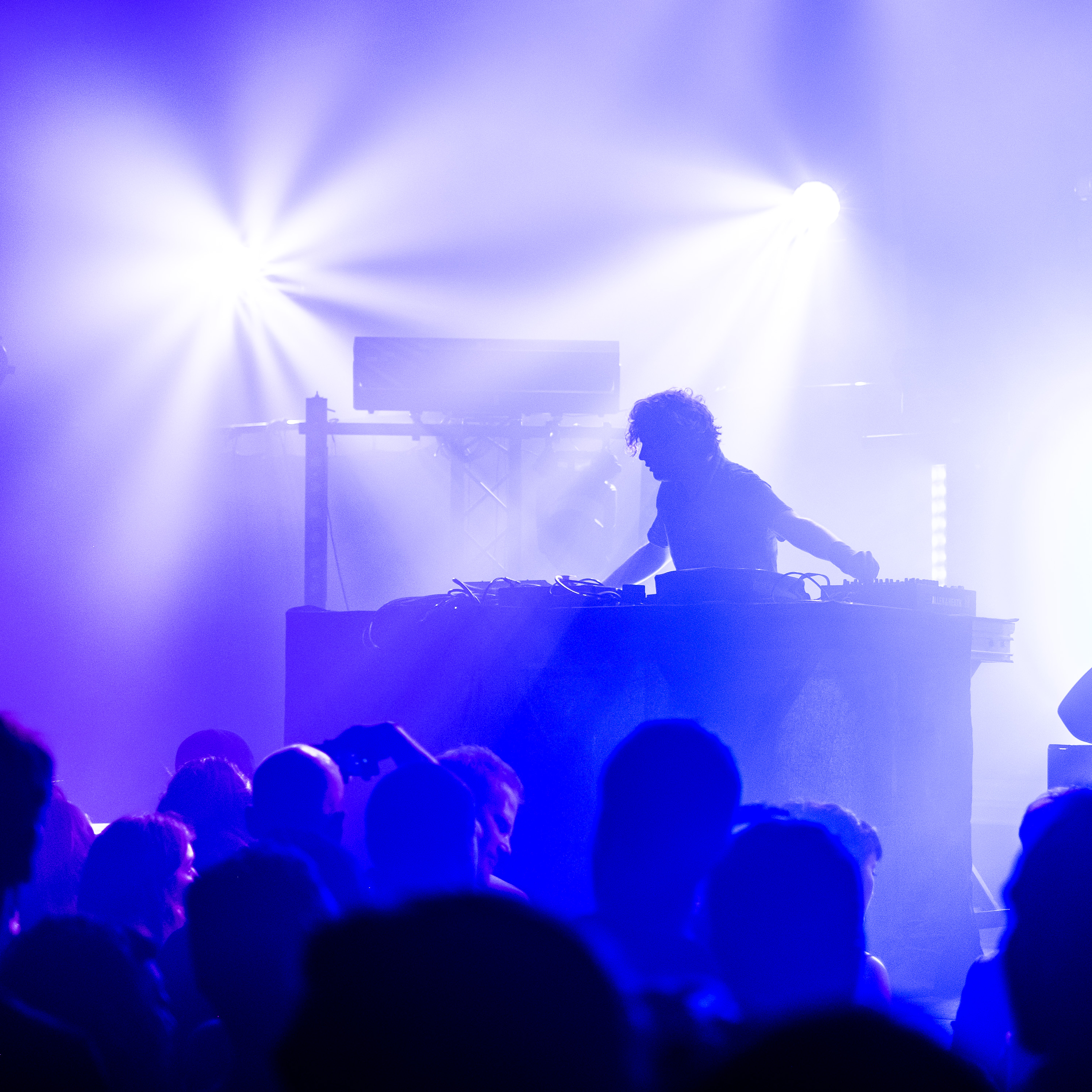
- Fake performing at La Gaîté Lyrique, Paris in 2018

Background information
- Born: 3 March 1983 (age 43); King's Lynn, Norfolk, England
- Origin: Necton, Norfolk, England
- Genres: Electronic, techno, ambient
- Occupations: Musician, producer
- Instrument: Synthesizer
- Years active: 2003–present
- Labels: Cambria Instruments, Ninja Tune, Border Community, InFiné

Nathan Fake (born 1 March 1983) is a British electronic musician. He first gained attention through releases on James Holden's Border Community label, particularly the single "The Sky Was Pink" (2004), whose remix by Holden proved influential and attracted sustained attention over two years. Fake has released seven studio albums across four labels—Border Community, Ninja Tune, his own Cambria Instruments, and InFiné—and has remixed artists including Radiohead, Jon Hopkins, and Sasha. He co-founded Cambria Instruments with Wesley Matsell in 2014. His work has been generally well received by critics, with his debut Drowning in a Sea of Love (2006) his most acclaimed release.

== Early life ==
Fake was born in King's Lynn, and grew up in the village of Necton, Norfolk, in a non-musical family with an agricultural background. He received a Casio keyboard as a childhood Christmas gift, which sparked his interest in music-making. He discovered electronic music through BBC radio as a teenager, first becoming interested in the Prodigy around the age of fourteen before developing an intense interest in Orbital, whom he listened to almost exclusively for approximately three years. He later cited Aphex Twin as a further influence, and has said that reading music magazines about the equipment used in electronic production deepened his interest in the genre. His first instrument was the piano, which he learned by memorising pieces by ear.

Fake began making music around the age of fifteen and started producing seriously at seventeen. He attended school in Swaffham, where he has said musical interests were marginalised in favour of sport. At nineteen, he enrolled at a music college in Reading, but dropped out during his second year after his music career began to take priority over coursework. During his first year at college, he emailed an unfinished track to James Holden through the Border Community website; Holden responded positively and requested a finished version, which became Fake's debut release. After a period living in London, he returned to East Anglia.

== Career ==
=== 2003–2013: Border Community ===
Fake's debut release, the Outhouse EP, appeared on Border Community in 2003. The following year, he released the single "The Sky Was Pink", which became a breakthrough for both Fake and the label. Holden's remix of the track proved unexpectedly successful, continuing to grow in popularity over two years and spawning numerous imitators. The remix's prominence complicated matters for Fake, as audiences came to expect the remix rather than his original compositions.

Fake's debut album, Drowning in a Sea of Love, was released in March 2006 as the first full-length on Border Community. It received positive reviews; Pitchfork awarded it 8.4 out of 10 and Rosie Swash of The Observer compared it to the work of Boards of Canada. Remixes of tracks from the album, particularly the FortDax and Four Tet reworkings of "You Are Here", further raised Fake's profile.

His second album, Hard Islands, followed in April 2009. Clash gave the album 8 out of 10, describing Fake as "one of the most interesting and promising electronic talents around" and praising its blend of techno, IDM, and shoegaze influences. In 2011, Fake remixed Radiohead's "Morning Mr Magpie" for the album TKOL RMX 1234567, after being approached by frontman Thom Yorke.

Fake's third and final Border Community album, Steam Days, was released in September 2012. FACT described it as his "most dynamic album-length work to date", while Resident Advisor noted a return to the "fuzzy melodies and subtle, static-laced gleam" of his earlier work.

=== 2014–2018: Cambria Instruments and Ninja Tune ===
In 2014, Fake co-founded the label Cambria Instruments with Wesley Matsell, with their inaugural release being a split single between the two artists. The Glaive EP followed on the label in 2015.

After extensive touring in support of Steam Days, Fake experienced a prolonged period of writer's block. He broke through the creative impasse after purchasing a Korg Prophecy synthesiser from the 1990s, whose limitations as a monophonic instrument forced him to approach composition more intuitively, playing melodies in real time rather than programming sequences. Fake signed to Ninja Tune through rapport developed from prior remix work, and released the singles "DEGREELESSNESS / Now We Know" and "RVK" in late 2016 and early 2017.

His fourth album, Providence, was released on Ninja Tune in March 2017. It received generally favourable reviews, with a score of 73 out of 100 on Metacritic based on ten reviews. Resident Advisor gave the album four out of five, praising it as a reinvention, and The Skinny highlighted the layered sound resulting from the Prophecy's constraints. Two remix EPs, Providence Reworks Parts I and II, followed later that year, featuring reworkings by Overmono, Konx Om Pax, and Olga Wojciechowska. The Sunder EP was released on Ninja Tune in 2018.

=== 2019–present: Independent releases ===
In 2019, Fake reissued two of his earliest EPs, Watlington Street and Dinamo, on Cambria Instruments. His fifth studio album, Blizzards, followed in April 2020; most of the album was recorded live in single takes on a stripped-back hardware setup. Resident Advisor described it as potentially "Fake's best LP yet" and his most club-friendly record, noting its "chunky breakbeats and swinging garage drums". The album was followed by the Sanxenxo EP and Blizzards Remixes in 2021.

Fake's sixth album, Crystal Vision, was released on 7 April 2023. The Quietus reviewed the album favourably, and Inverted Audio praised its range. The Guiro EP followed in October 2023. In December 2024, he released Covers (From Memory), an EP of cover versions of tracks by Slam, Orbital, and Industry Standard, recreated from memory without re-listening to the originals.

In March 2025, Fake released the single "Hypercube" on Cambria Instruments; sounds from the track formed the basis of a sample pack he created for Spitfire Audio's LABS+ platform. His seventh album, Evaporator, was released on InFiné in February 2026, his first release on the French label. Written during the summer of 2024, the album was described by Cyclic Defrost as "radiant, physical, and full of air".

=== Critical reception ===
Fake's work has received generally favourable reviews throughout his career, though critical assessments have varied between albums. His debut, Drowning in a Sea of Love, was his most acclaimed release, with Pitchfork awarding it 8.4 out of 10. His middle-period albums received more mixed responses; Hard Islands and Steam Days both received 6.2 out of 10 from Pitchfork, and Steam Days scored 67 out of 100 on Metacritic from thirteen reviews. Providence fared better, with a Metacritic score of 73 out of 100. Later work saw a critical recovery: Pitchfork gave Crystal Vision a 7.6, and Resident Advisor described Blizzards as potentially his strongest album.

Critics have consistently noted a tension in Fake's output between atmospheric, melodic composition and harder, more club-oriented material, with individual albums tending to favour one approach over the other. Reviewers have frequently situated his work within the tradition of 1990s British electronica, drawing comparisons to Boards of Canada, Orbital, and Aphex Twin. The shift in his production method around Providence — from programmed sequences to real-time performance on the Korg Prophecy — was widely noted as a turning point.

== Musical style and equipment ==
Critics have described Fake's music as blending electronica, techno, IDM, and shoegaze influences. Resident Advisor characterised the Border Community sound as "midnight bliss brand of electronica and off-kilt analogue techno", drawing on "British techno and ambient house of the early to mid-'90s". His debut album drew comparisons to Boards of Canada, while later work has incorporated elements of breakbeat and UK garage. A Closer Listen noted the continued influence of Autechre, Orbital, and Aphex Twin across his career.

Fake has cited the Korg Prophecy, a 1990s monophonic synthesizer, as a pivotal instrument, describing how its limitations forced him to compose more intuitively. Other equipment he has used includes a Roland SH-09, MC-202, and various drum machines. He has expressed a preference for "obsolete, '90s digital synths" over modular setups. He typically records synthesiser parts onto cassette tape before transferring them to computer, and uses Cubase as his primary digital audio workstation, a setup largely unchanged since his early career.

His production process has evolved over time. Earlier albums relied more on programmed sequences, while Providence was built from real-time jam sessions on the Prophecy. For Blizzards, Fake stripped his setup back further, recording most tracks live in single takes. He works entirely alone, without collaborators in the studio.

== Other work ==
=== Remix work ===
In addition to his solo releases, Fake has maintained an active career as a remixer. Beyond the Radiohead remix discussed above, he has reworked tracks for artists across a range of labels, including Jon Hopkins on Double Six Recordings, Clark on Warp Records, Dorian Concept on Ninja Tune, Irène Drésel on Room Records, Sasha on Last Night on Earth, and GoGo Penguin on Decca Records.

=== Television and media ===
Fake's track "Grandfathered" was used in a television advertisement for the Motorola Pebl phone and in Charlie Brooker's Screenwipe. His track "You Are Here" was used in the CSI: Miami episode "Miami Confidential", and the FortDax remix of the same track serves as the theme music for Newswipe with Charlie Brooker and Charlie Brooker's Weekly Wipe on BBC Four.

== Discography ==
=== Studio albums ===
Studio albums
Title	Year	Label
Drowning in a Sea of Love	2006	Border Community
Hard Islands	2009	Border Community
Steam Days	2012	Border Community
Providence	2017	Ninja Tune
Blizzards	2020	Cambria Instruments
Crystal Vision	2023	Cambria Instruments
Evaporator	2026	InFiné

=== Singles and EPs ===
Singles and EPs
Title	Year	Label
Outhouse	2003	Border Community
Watlington Street EP	2004	Saw Recordings
The Sky Was Pink	2004	Border Community
Dinamo EP	2005	Traum Schallplatten
Silent Night	2005	Border Community
Drowning in a Sea of Remixes	2006	Border Community
You Are Here	2007	Border Community
Iceni Strings	2012	Border Community
Paean	2013	Border Community
CAMBRIA01 (split with Wesley Matsell)	2014	Cambria Instruments
GLAIVE	2015	Cambria Instruments
DEGREELESSNESS / Now We Know	2016	Ninja Tune
RVK	2017	Ninja Tune
Providence Reworks – Part 1	2017	Ninja Tune
Providence Reworks – Part 2	2017	Ninja Tune
Sunder	2018	Ninja Tune
Sanxenxo	2021	Cambria Instruments
Sandstone	2021	Cambria Instruments
The Grass	2023	Cambria Instruments
Vimana	2023	Cambria Instruments
Amen 96 (Drumless Version)	2023	Cambria Instruments
Guiro EP	2023	Cambria Instruments
Outhouse 2023	2023	Cambria Instruments
Covers (From Memory)	2024	Cambria Instruments
Hypercube	2025	Cambria Instruments

=== Remixes ===
- Avus – "Real (Nathan Fake Remix)" – Border Community (2004)
- Perc – "Closer (Nathan Fake Remix)" – Premier Sounds (2004)
- DJ Remy – "Scrambled (Nathan Fake Remix)" – Additive Records (2004)
- Steve Lawler – "Out at Night (Nathan's Night In)" – Subversive Records (2004)
- Tiefschwarz – "Isst (Nathan Fake Remix)" – Fine Records (2005)
- Shocking Pinks – "Dressed To Please (Nathan Fake Remix)" – DFA Records (2008)
- Vincent Oliver – "Clouds in The Haeds (Nathan Fake Remix)" – Lo Recordings (2008)
- Starting Teeth – "Venom (Nathan Fake Remix)" – Creaked Records (2009)
- Grasscut – "Muppet (Nathan Fake Remix)" – Ninja Tune (2010)
- Jon Hopkins – "Wire (Nathan Fake Remix)" – Double Six Recordings (2010)
- Walls – "Gaberdine" – Kompakt (2010)
- PVT – "Light Up Bright Fires (Nathan Fake Remix)" – Warp Records (2010)
- Radiohead – "Morning Mr Magpie (Nathan Fake Rmx)" (2011)
- Neon Jung – "Delirium Tremens (Nathan Fake Remix)" – Magic Wire Recordings (2012)
- Clark – "Growls Garden (Nathan Fake Remix)" – Warp Records (2013)
- Dorian Concept – "Draft Culture (Nathan Fake Remix)" – Ninja Tune (2015)
- Ultraísta – "Party Line (Nathan Fake Remix)" – Partisan Records (2019)
- Dominik Eulberg – "Dreizehnspecht (Nathan Fake Remix)" – Studio !K7 (2020)
- Irène Drésel – "Chambre2 (Nathan Fake Remix)" – Room Records (2020)
- Christian Löffler – "Roth feat. Mohna (Nathan Fake Remix)" – Ki Records (2020)
- Damian Lazarus – "Into The Sun (Nathan Fake Remix)" – Crosstown Rebels (2020)
- Sophie Hutchings – "Orange Glow (Nathan Fake Remix)" – Mercury KX (2020)
- GoGo Penguin – "Open (Nathan Fake Remix)" – Decca Records France (2021)
- The Micronaut – "Archery (Nathan Fake Remix)" – Ki Records (2021)
- Field Works – "Station 5 Review (Nathan Fake Remix)" – Temporary Residence (2022)
- Tennyson – "Slow Dance (Nathan Fake Remix)" – Counter Records (2022)
- BLOODMOON, Bearcubs – "All In Place (Nathan Fake Remix)" – Eat Your Own Ears (2022)
- Paradigm Shift – "Force One (Nathan Fake Remix)" – Lone Romantic (2023)
- bdrmm – "Alps (Nathan Fake Remix)" – Rock Action Records (2024)
- Hrdvsion – "Captivated Heart (Nathan Fake Remix)" – Creaked Records (2024)
- The Ocean – "Preboreal (Nathan Fake Rework)" – Pelagic Records (2024)
- Sasha – "How to Wear Raybans Well (Nathan Fake Remix)" – Last Night on Earth (2024)
- La Pointe – "Umbra (Nathan Fake Remix)" – Secret Teachings (2025)
- C. Diab – "Lunar Barge (Nathan Fake Remix)" – Tonal Union (2025)
- Anzwart – "A step on the horizon (Nathan Fake Remix)" – Anzwart (2025)

=== Compilation appearances ===
- "The Sky Was Pink" – Fear & Loathing 2, Mixed by Luke Slater – Resist Music (2004)
- "Numb Chance" – Elektronische Musik: Interkontinental 5 – Traum Schallplatten (2006)
- "Laluna" – #savefabric – Fabric Records & Houndstooth (2016)

=== Collaborations ===
- "Lava Flow" (collaboration with Milky Globe) (2006) – LoEB
