= Eolian Instate =

EP by patten
- Released: November 25, 2013
- Genre: Experimental, Electronic
- Length: 22:07
- Label: Warp Records

Patten chronology
GLAQJO XAACSSO (2011)	Eolian Instate (2013)	Estoile Naiant (2014)

Eolian Instate is the first release by Patten following the announcement of signing to Warp Records in 2013.

The release was of 500 physical copies.

== Track listing ==
No.	Title	Length
1.	"Aviary"	3:59
2.	"Towards infinite shores"	3:23
3.	"oea/Catalogue"	6:32
4.	"Obsidian Alms (mid-saccade)"	4:00
5.	"Sixth seven"	4:13
