= Hard Islands =

Studio album by Nathan Fake
- Released: 27 April 2009
- Genre: Electronic
- Length: 33:01
- Label: Border Community
- Producer: Nathan Fake

Nathan Fake chronology
Drowning in a Sea of Love (2006)	Hard Islands (2009)	Steam Days (2012)

Hard Islands is the second studio album by English electronic musician Nathan Fake. It was released on 27 April 2009 through Border Community, the label run by James Holden. Comprising six tracks across 33 minutes, the album marked a shift toward a harder, more club-oriented sound compared to his debut Drowning in a Sea of Love (2006). Hard Islands received mixed to positive reviews from critics.

== Background ==
While Fake had gained recognition for the atmospheric, IDM-influenced sound of Drowning in a Sea of Love, his earlier EPs such as Outhouse (2003) and Dinamo (2005) had placed a greater emphasis on rhythm. On Hard Islands, he returned to that more dancefloor-oriented approach, with live performances in the intervening years pushing his sound in a harder direction. The album's six tracks move between dense, effects-laden pieces and shorter interludes, with the longest track, "Castle Rising", running close to nine minutes.

The album's packaging features photographs by Dan Tombs of the eroding Norfolk coastline, reflecting Fake's connection to the region.

== Critical reception ==
Professional ratings
Review scores
Source	Rating
Clash	8/10
Pitchfork	6.2/10
Drowned in Sound	6/10
The Line of Best Fit	5.5/10

Hard Islands received mixed to positive reviews. Clash gave the album 8 out of 10, praising Fake for developing a distinct sound that blends techno, IDM, shoegaze, and ambient influences without sounding derivative. Resident Advisor was similarly positive, describing the album as straddling the line between melodic sophistication and harder-edged experimentation, and praising the balance of restraint and intensity across the six tracks.

Drowned in Sound gave the album 6 out of 10, acknowledging the shift toward denser, more club-oriented material but finding that the heavier production came at the cost of the melodic warmth of Fake's debut. The Line of Best Fit gave a similar assessment at 5.5 out of 10, praising the energetic opening tracks but criticising the album's brevity and the unevenness of its second half. Mark Pytlik of Pitchfork rated the album 6.2 out of 10, framing it as a deliberate move away from the pastoral IDM of the debut and a return to the rhythm-focused approach of Fake's earlier EPs, but noting that the six-track running time left it feeling less than a fully assertive statement.

== Track listing ==
All tracks are written by Nathan Fake.

Hard Islands track listing
No.	Title	Length
1.	"The Turtle"	6:18
2.	"Basic Mountain"	6:13
3.	"The Curlew"	1:15
4.	"Castle Rising"	8:57
5.	"Narrier"	3:32
6.	"Fentiger"	6:46

== Personnel ==
- Nathan Fake – production, all instruments
