= Providence (album) =

Studio album by Nathan Fake
- Released: 10 March 2017
- Recorded: 2016
- Genre: Electronic
- Length: 46:57
- Label: Ninja Tune
- Producer: Nathan Fake

Nathan Fake chronology
Steam Days (2012)	Providence (2017)	Blizzards (2020)

Singles from Providence
- 1. "DEGREELESSNESS / Now We Know" Released: 2 December 2016; 2. "RVK" Released: 1 February 2017

Providence is the fourth studio album by English electronic musician Nathan Fake. It was released on 10 March 2017 through Ninja Tune, his first release on the label. The album was recorded during the first half of 2016 following a period of writer's block, and features Fake's first vocal collaborations. Providence received generally favourable reviews, with a score of 73 out of 100 on Metacritic.

== Background ==
After extensive touring in support of his third album Steam Days (2012), Fake experienced a two-year creative drought, describing it as a cycle of being unable or unwilling to make music. He broke through the block after purchasing a Korg Prophecy synthesiser from the 1990s, whose limitations as a monophonic instrument forced him to approach composition more intuitively, playing melodies in real time rather than programming sequences in a digital audio workstation. The album's title references the Prophecy's name.

Fake recorded the album through jam sessions, with synthesiser parts captured on cassette tape before being transferred to computer, a workflow that added organic texture to the sound. The album features vocal contributions from Dominic Fernow on "DEGREELESSNESS" and Raphaelle Standell-Preston of Braids on "RVK", marking Fake's first collaborations with vocalists. Fake's move to Ninja Tune came through prior remix work and rapport with the label.

== Critical reception ==
Professional ratings
Aggregate scores
Source	Rating
Metacritic	73/100
Review scores
Source	Rating
Resident Advisor	4/5 stars
The Skinny	4/5 stars
The Irish Times	3/5 stars
The Line of Best Fit	6/10

Providence received generally favourable reviews. At Metacritic, which assigns a normalised rating out of 100 to reviews from mainstream publications, the album received an average score of 73, based on 10 reviews. Resident Advisor praised the album as a reinvention, noting that Fake's confidence seemed renewed and that the record marked a more urgent and aggressive direction while retaining his distinctive identity. The Skinny highlighted the layered sound resulting from the Korg Prophecy's constraints and praised Fake's first vocal collaborations. Writing for The Irish Times, Chris Jones noted the album's move away from the dancefloor, describing it as intense and disorienting. The Line of Best Fit gave a more mixed assessment, praising the collaborative tracks but finding some of the album's compositions directionless.

== Track listing ==
All tracks are written by Nathan Fake.

Providence track listing
No.	Title	Length
1.	"feelings 1"	1:41
2.	"PROVIDENCE"	4:59
3.	"HoursDaysMonthsSeasons"	5:45
4.	"DEGREELESSNESS" (featuring Prurient)	8:07
5.	"The Equator & I"	2:24
6.	"unen"	2:04
7.	"SmallCityLights"	4:10
8.	"Radio Spiritworld"	2:36
9.	"CONNECTIVITY"	2:51
10.	"RVK" (featuring Raphaelle)	5:25
11.	"REMAIN"	3:40
12.	"feelings 2"	3:15

== Personnel ==
- Nathan Fake – production, all instruments
- Dominic Fernow – vocals on "DEGREELESSNESS"
- Raphaelle Standell-Preston – vocals on "RVK"
