= Blizzards (album) =

Studio album by Nathan Fake
- Released: 3 April 2020
- Genre: Electronic
- Length: 63:24
- Label: Cambria Instruments

Nathan Fake chronology
Providence (2017)	Blizzards (2020)	Crystal Vision (2023)

Singles from Blizzards
- 1. "Tbilisi" Released: 12 February 2020; 2. "Vectra" Released: 20 March 2020; 3. "Torch Song" Released: 24 April 2020

Blizzards is the fifth studio album by English electronic musician Nathan Fake, released on 3 April 2020 through Cambria Instruments. Fake recorded most of the album live in one take, using a stripped-back setup. The album was preceded by the singles "Tbilisi", "Vectra", and "Torch Song". Blizzards received generally favourable reviews from critics.

== Critical reception ==
Professional ratings
Aggregate scores
Source	Rating
Metacritic	79/100
Review scores
Source	Rating
AllMusic	4.5/5 stars

Blizzards received generally favourable reviews from critics. At Metacritic, which assigns a weighted average rating out of 100 to reviews from mainstream publications, the album received an average score of 79, based on 4 reviews. Paul Simpson of AllMusic rated the album 4.5 out of 5 stars, calling it Fake's "strongest album" so far. Andrew Ryce of Resident Advisor wrote favourably of the album, describing it as a return to the approach that defined Fake's earlier work. Simon Whight of Inverted Audio also reviewed the album positively, highlighting its energy and live recording approach.

== Track listing ==
All tracks are written by Nathan Fake.

Blizzards track listing
No.	Title	Length
1.	"Cry Me a Blizzard"	5:25
2.	"Tbilisi"	4:01
3.	"Pentiamonds"	5:07
4.	"Stepping Stone"	7:14
5.	"Ezekiel"	6:36
6.	"North Brink"	3:44
7.	"Vectra"	3:43
8.	"Firmament"	8:46
9.	"Torch Song"	5:25
10.	"Eris & Dysnomia"	7:37
11.	"Vitesse"	5:46
