= Irène Drésel =

French electronic music producer (born 1984)

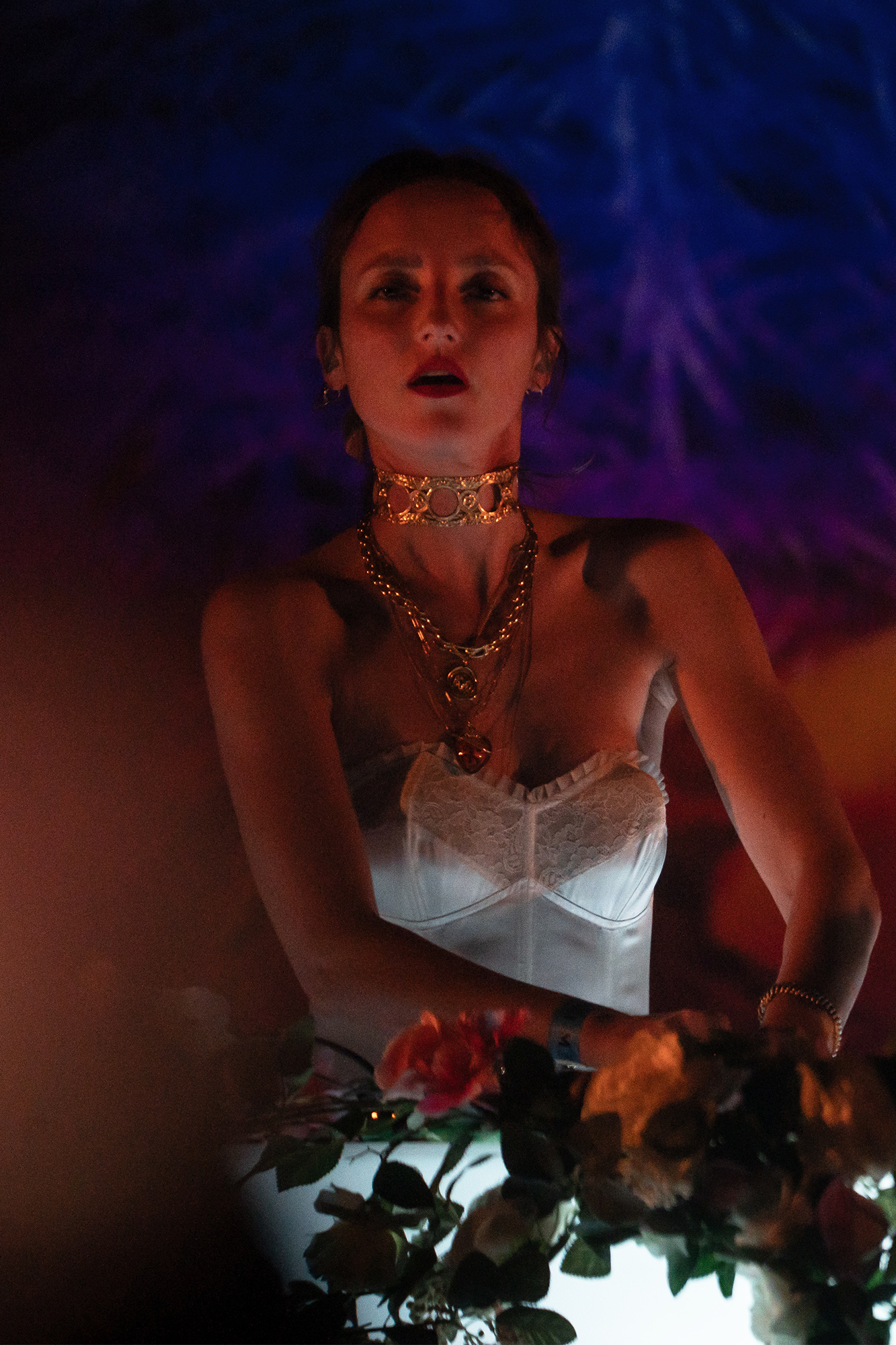
- Drésel in 2024

Background information
- Birth name: Irène Billard
- Born: 1984 (age 40–41); France
- Genres: Techno
- Occupations: Musician; record producer; DJ
- Years active: 2016–present
- Website: www.irenedresel.com

Irène Drésel (née Billard; born 1984) is a French electronic music producer.

In 2023, for her score of the film Full Time she won the César Award for Best Original Music, becoming the first woman to do so.

== Early life and education ==
Drésel was born Irène Billard and grew up in a Paris banlieue. Her father was an engineer and her mother ran a travel agency before she was born. She joined the Conservatoire de Rueil-Malmaison at the age of 7, where she studied piano for two years, music theory for five years and classical dance for ten years. She earned a baccalauréat L (littéraire) with honours. She spent a year in a preparatory class at the École d'Arts de Rueil-Malmaison after which she entered the Beaux-Arts de Paris in a dual programme with the Gobelins school. It was at this time that she rediscovered her passion for music while searching for music to accompany a video needed for her diploma. After receiving her diploma she started an "intense" six-month internship at the SAE Institute in Aubervilliers. She also worked as a visual artist in photography, video, installation and performance.

== Career ==
Borrowing her mother's maiden name, she took the stage name Irène Drésel and began composing electronic music. Her musical style is typically described as techno. Trax Magazine highlighted the melancholic melodies in her music and compared it to those released by the German music label Innervisions and that of French artist Rone. She gave her first concert on 6 April 2016, at the Silencio club in Paris.

In February 2023, she won the César Award for Best Original Music for her work on the film Full Time, her first composition for cinema. She was the seventh woman to be nominated for the award in 48 years, after Émilie Simon, Delphine Mantoulet, Béatrice Thiriet, Anne Dudley, Sophie Hunger and Fatima Al Qadiri, but the first to win. She concluded her acceptance speech by dedicating her prize to all female composers.

== Discography ==
=== Albums ===
- Hyper Cristal (2019)
- KINKY DOGMA (2021)
- Rose Fluo (2024)

=== EPs ===
- Rita (2017)
- STUPRE (2020)
- Je t'aime (2021)

== Awards and honours ==
- 2023: César Award for Best Original Music for Full Time
- 2023: Chevalier of the Ordre des Arts et des Lettres

=== Nominations ===
- 2023: Lumière Award for Best Music for Full Time
