= Sutekh (musician) =

Musician

- Origin: United States
- Genres: Electronic
- Years active: 1997–present
- Members: Seth Horvitz

Sutekh, the alias of Seth Joshua Horvitz, is a music composer and performer of experimental electronic and techno music. He has released on several international record labels such as Mille Plateaux, Plug Research, Soul Jazz, Leaf, Kit Clayton's Orthlorng Musork and his own Context Free Media.

He performed under the name Moron together with Safety Scissors, with whom he shared a flat in Oakland in 1997. Along with Kit Clayton, the three released two albums as Pigeon Funk (the second one without Safety Scissors). He has also performed and recorded under the names Rrose and Suite K.

Horvitz was born in 1973 and grew up in Venice Beach. He holds a BA in Cognitive Science from the University of California at Berkeley (1995) and an MFA in Electronic Music and Recording Media from Mills College (2010).

== Discography ==
=== Albums ===
- Periods.Make.Sense (2000), Force Inc. Music Works
- Deadpan Escapement: Reconstructed with Twerk (2000), Context Free Media
- Fell (2002), Orthlorng Musork
- Incest Live (2002), Force Inc. Music Works
- On Bach (2010), Creaked Records
