= Drowning in a Sea of Love =

Studio album by Nathan Fake
- Released: 20 March 2006
- Length: 42:07
- Label: Border Community
- Producer: Nathan Fake

Nathan Fake chronology
Drowning in a Sea of Love (2006)	Hard Islands (2009)

Singles from Drowning in a Sea of Love
- 1. "The Sky Was Pink" Released: 23 August 2004

Drowning in a Sea of Love is the debut studio album by English electronic musician Nathan Fake. It was released on 20 March 2006 through Border Community, the label founded by James Holden. It was the first album released on the Border Community label.

The album includes "The Sky Was Pink", originally released as a single in 2004, which had attracted attention partly due to Holden's remix of the track.

== Critical reception ==
Professional ratings
Review scores
Source	Rating
Pitchfork	8.4/10
AllMusic	3.5/5 stars

The album received positive reviews. Pitchfork gave the album an 8.4 out of 10. Rosie Swash of The Observer compared the album to the work of Boards of Canada.

== Track listing ==
All tracks are written by Nathan Fake.

Drowning in a Sea of Love track listing
No.	Title	Length
1.	"Stops"	4:34
2.	"Grandfathered"	3:15
3.	"Charlie's House"	5:29
4.	"Bumblechord"	3:10
5.	"Superpositions"	2:31
6.	"Bawsey"	0:58
7.	"The Sky Was Pink"	4:50
8.	"You Are Here"	4:25
9.	"Falmer"	1:46
10.	"Long Sunny"	5:20
11.	"Fell"	5:49
