= Jewel discography =

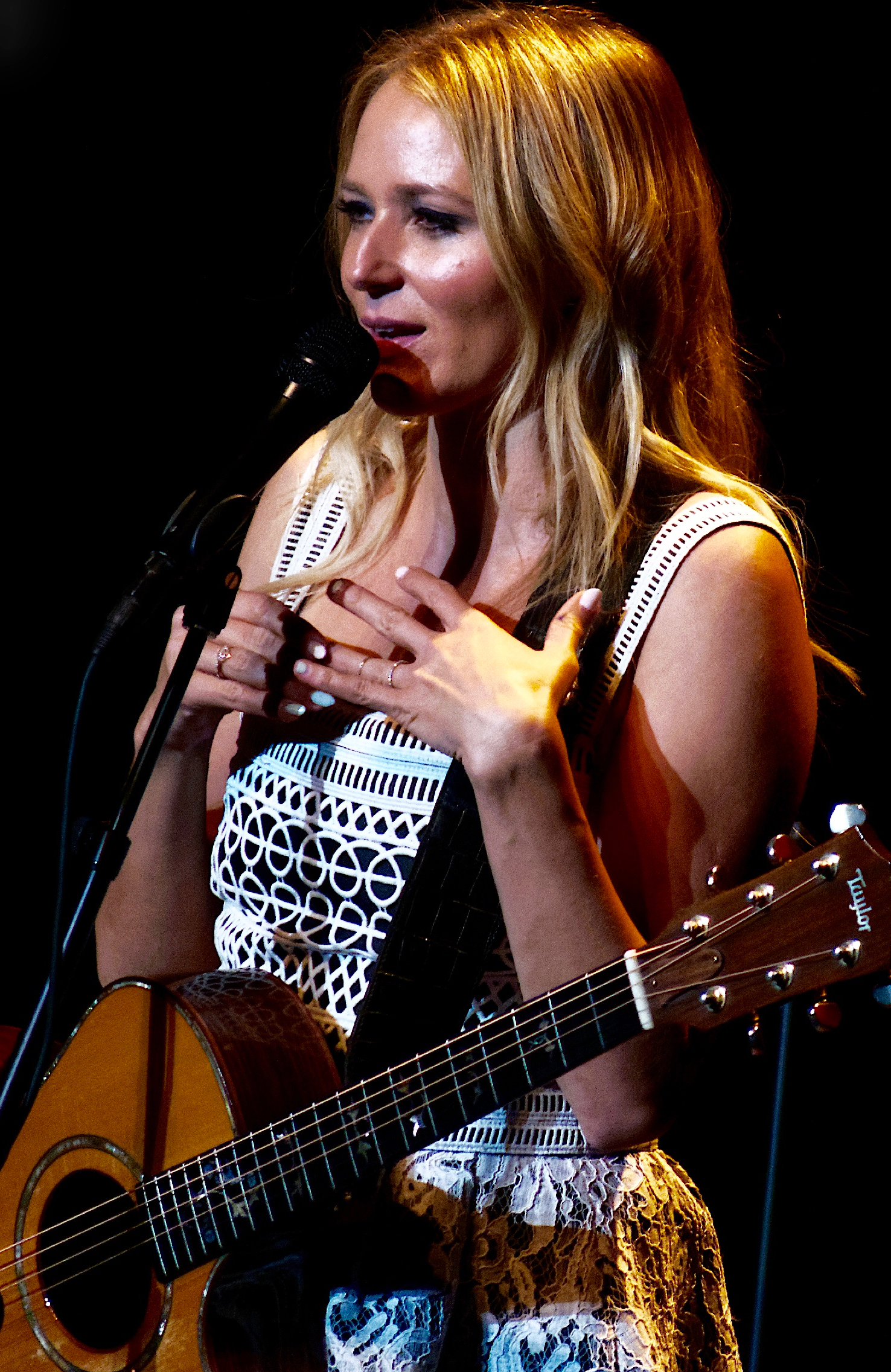
- Jewel performing in 2016
- Studio albums: 13
- Extended plays: 9
- Soundtrack albums: 8
- Live albums: 4
- Compilation albums: 4
- Tribute albums: 2
- Remix albums: 1
- Singles: 43
- Video albums: 5
- Music videos: 37
- Audiobooks: 5

The discography of Jewel, an American singer-songwriter, consists of 13 studio albums, four live albums, five compilation albums, 43 singles, nine extended plays, 37 music videos, five video albums and five spoken-word albums. She debuted in 1995 after signing with Atlantic Records.

Jewel's debut album, Pieces of You was issued in February 1995. Although it was not initially successful, the lead single, "Who Will Save Your Soul" eventually reached No. 11 on the Billboard Hot 100, pressing the album to later sell over twelve million copies. Follow-up singles "You Were Meant for Me" and "Foolish Games" both became Top 10 hits on the same Billboard chart. Her second album Spirit was released in November 1998 and was certified 4× Multi-Platinum in the United States. Its first single "Hands" reached No. 6 on the Billboard Hot 100 that year. Her 2001 release This Way was certified Platinum in the United States and produced the Top 30 hit, "Standing Still".

Her fourth album 0304 was released in June 2003 with a more pop sound. It reached No. 2 on the Billboard 200 and was certified Gold in the United States. It spawned the Top 20 single "Intuition". Both "Intuition" and its follow-up single "Stand" became number one Dance/Club hits. In May 2006, her sixth album Goodbye Alice in Wonderland was released, reaching No. 8 in the United States. Jewel released her first country album Perfectly Clear in June 2008. It reached No. 1 on the Billboard Top Country Albums chart and spawned the hit "Stronger Woman". Her subsequent album, Sweet and Wild, reached No. 3 on the Billboard Top Country Albums chart. Jewel has sold over 18.5 million records in the United States according to the Recording Industry Association of America.

== Studio albums ==
Title	Album details	Peak chart positions									Certifications (sales threshold)
Title	Album details	US	US Country	AUS	CAN	FRA	NL	NZ	SWE	UK	Certifications (sales threshold)
Pieces of You	Release date: February 28, 1995; Label: Atlantic	4	—	5	2	69	12	1	20	82	RIAA: Diamond (12× Platinum); ARIA: 6× Platinum; MC: 8× Platinum
Spirit	Release date: November 17, 1998; Label: Atlantic	3	—	5	6	52	16	4	53	54	RIAA: 4× Platinum; ARIA: 3× Platinum
This Way	Release date: November 13, 2001; Label: Atlantic	9	—	6	26	41	15	26	30	26	RIAA: Platinum; ARIA: Platinum; MC: Platinum
0304	Release date: June 3, 2003; Label: Atlantic	2	—	10	9	141	12	16	56	79	RIAA: Gold; ARIA: Gold; MC: Gold
Goodbye Alice in Wonderland	Release date: May 2, 2006; Label: Atlantic	8	—	17	—	—	33	36	42	114	
Perfectly Clear	Release date: June 3, 2008; Label: Valory Music Group	8	1	118	28	—	—	—	—	—	
Sweet and Wild	Release date: June 8, 2010; Label: Valory Music Group	11	3	179	—	—	—	—	—	—	
Picking Up the Pieces	Release date: September 11, 2015; Label: Sugar Hill	28	—	75	—	—	—	—	—	—	
Freewheelin' Woman	Released: April 15, 2022; Label: Words Matter Media	— (Note: Freewheelin' Woman did not enter the Billboard 200, but peaked at number 89 on the US Top Current Album Sales chart.)	—	—	—	—	—	—	—	—	
"—" denotes releases that did not chart

=== Holiday albums ===
Title	Album details	Peak chart positions					Certifications (sales threshold)
Title	Album details	US	US Holiday	US Indie	AUS	CAN	Certifications (sales threshold)
Joy: A Holiday Collection	Release date: November 2, 1999; Label: Atlantic Records	32	2	—	61	43	RIAA: Platinum
Let It Snow: A Holiday Collection	Release date: September 24, 2013; Label: Somerset Group	43	20	7	—	—	
"—" denotes releases that did not chart

=== Children's music albums ===
Title	Album details	Peak chart positions			Certifications (sales threshold)
Title	Album details	US	US Indie	US Kids	Certifications (sales threshold)
Lullaby	Release date: May 5, 2009; Label: Fisher-Price	117	13	1	MC: Gold
The Merry Goes 'Round	Release date: August 16, 2011; Label: Fisher-Price	—	—	—	
"—" denotes releases that did not chart

== Compilation albums ==
Title	Album details	Peak positions
Title	Album details	US
iTunes Originals	Release date: October 17, 2006; Label: Concord Music	—
Once Upon a Lullaby	Release date: 2011; Label: Fisher-Price	—
Greatest Hits	Release date: February 5, 2013; Label: Rhino Entertainment	73
The Greatest Hits Remixed	Release date: March 29, 2013; Label: Concord Music	—
The Jewel Collection (5-album box-set)	Release date: October 12, 2013; Label: Concord Music	—
"—" denotes releases that did not chart

== Live albums ==
Title	Album details
Historic Mountain Winery Saratoga, CA 06/17/04	Release date: June 17, 2004; Label: Instant Live/Atlantic
North Stage On Summerfest Grounds – Milwaukee, WI 7/10/04	Release date: July 10, 2004; Label: Instant Live/Atlantic
Morris Performing Arts Center South Bend, IN 7/13/04	Release date: July 13, 2004; Label: Instant Live/Atlantic
Live at the Inner Change (limited edition 2×LP)	Release date: November 27, 2020; Label: Craft

== Spoken-word albums ==
Title	Album details
A Night Without Armor	CD/cassette of Jewel reading her poetry book A Night Without Armor: Poems; Released: May 1, 1998; Label: Harper Audio (ISBN 978-0694520435)
Chasing Down the Dawn	2×CD/cassette of Jewel reading her book Chasing Down the Dawn: Stories from the Road; Released: October 3, 2000; Label: Harper Audio (ISBN 978-0694521517)
That's What I'd Do	Book and CD of Jewel's first children's book That's What I'd Do; story and music; Released: September 18, 2012; Label: Simon & Schuster/Paula Wiseman Books (ISBN 978-1442458130)
Sweet Dreams	Book and CD of Jewel's second children's book Sweet Dreams; story and music; Released: September 17, 2013; Label: Simon & Schuster/Paula Wiseman Books (ISBN 978-1442489318)
Never Broken: Songs Are Only Half the Story	9-CD box set/digital audio of Jewel reading her memoir Never Broken: Songs Are Only Half the Story; Released: September 15, 2015; Label: Blackstone Audio (ISBN 978-1504630283)

== Extended plays ==
Title	EP details
Queen of Hearts	Release date: December 16, 2021; Label: Words Matter Media
The Portal: A Meditative Journey	Release date: July 28, 2024; Label: Words Matter Media
Live at The Song	Release date: July 25, 2025; Label: The Song/BMG

== Singles ==
Year	Title	Peak chart positions										Certifications (sales threshold)	Album
Year	Title	US	US AC	US Adult	US Country	US Dance	AUS	CAN	NL	NZ	UK	Certifications (sales threshold)	Album
1996	"Who Will Save Your Soul"	11	29	5	—	—	27	7	—	14	52		Pieces of You
1996	"You Were Meant for Me"	2	1	1	—	—	3	2	69	22	32	RIAA: Platinum; ARIA: Platinum	Pieces of You
1997	"Foolish Games"	2	4	1	—	—	12	2	10	23	—	ARIA: Gold	Pieces of You
1997	"Morning Song"	—	—	—	—	—	—	—	—	—	—		Pieces of You
1998	"Hands"	6	7	2	—	—	25	1	35	19	41	ARIA: Gold	Spirit
1999	"Down So Long"	59	—	10	—	—	115	7	—	16	38		Spirit
1999	"Jupiter (Swallow the Moon)"	—	—	39	—	—	—	47	—	—	—		Spirit
1999	"What's Simple Is True"	—	—	—	—	—	—	—	—	—	—		Spirit
1999	"Life Uncommon"	—	—	—	—	—	—	—	—	—	—		Spirit
2001	"Standing Still"	25	19	3	—	—	32	—	68	7	83		This Way
2002	"Break Me"	—	—	28	—	—	112	—	95	47	105		This Way
2002	"This Way"	—	—	36	—	—	—	—	—	—	—		This Way
2002	"Serve the Ego"	—	—	—	—	1	—	—	—	—	197		This Way
2003	"Intuition"	20	—	5	—	1	4	34	9	17	52	ARIA: Gold	0304
2003	"Stand"	—	—	37	—	1	21	—	71	—	—		0304
2003	"2 Become 1"	—	—	33	—	—	49	—	—	—	—		0304
2006	"Again and Again"	80	37	16	—	—	38	—	—	—	196		Goodbye Alice in Wonderland
2006	"Good Day"	—	—	30	—	—	—	—	—	—	—		Goodbye Alice in Wonderland
2006	"Only One Too"	—	—	—	—	— (Note: "Only One Too" did not enter the Dance Club Songs chart, but peaked at number 12 on the Dance Singles Sales chart.)	—	—	—	—	—		Goodbye Alice in Wonderland
2007	"Stephenville, TX"	—	—	—	—	—	—	—	—	—	—		Goodbye Alice in Wonderland
2008	"Stronger Woman"	84	—	—	13	—	—	—	—	—	—		Perfectly Clear
2008	"I Do"	—	—	—	38	—	—	—	—	—	—		Perfectly Clear
2008	"Till It Feels Like Cheating"	—	—	—	57	—	—	—	—	—	—		Perfectly Clear
2009	"Somewhere Over the Rainbow"	—	—	—	—	—	—	—	—	—	—		Lullaby
2010	"The Shape of You"	—	—	—	—	—	—	—	—	—	—		Non-album single
2010	"Stay Here Forever"	—	—	—	34	—	—	—	—	—	—		Sweet and Wild
2010	"Satisfied"	—	27	—	57	—	—	—	—	—	—		Sweet and Wild
2010	"Ten"	—	—	—	51	—	—	—	—	—	—		Sweet and Wild
2013	"Two Hearts Breaking"	—	14	—	—	—	—	—	—	—	—		Greatest Hits
2014	"Sing On"	—	—	—	—	—	—	—	—	—	—		Non-album single
2015	"My Father's Daughter" (featuring Dolly Parton)	—	—	—	—	—	—	—	—	—	—		Picking Up the Pieces
2019	"No More Tears" (Theme from Lost in America)	__	__	__	__	__	__	__	__	__	__		Freewheelin' Woman
2020	"Grateful"	—	—	—	—	—	—	—	—	—	—		Freewheelin' Woman
2022	"Dancing Slow" (featuring Train)	—	—	—	—	—	—	—	—	—	—		Freewheelin' Woman
2022	"Long Way 'Round"	—	—	—	—	—	—	—	—	—	—		Freewheelin' Woman
2024	"Goddess of Love"	—	—	—	—	—	—	—	—	—	—		The Portal: A Meditative Journey
"—" denotes releases that did not chart

=== Guest singles ===
Year	Single	Artist	Peak chart positions		Album
Year	Single	Artist	US Country	CAN Country	Album
1999	"That's the Way Love Goes"	Merle Haggard	56	71	For the Record: 43 Legendary Hits
2010	"Make It Last"	Tyrese	—	—	Tyrese Gibson's Mayhem! (Comic Book #2 Single)
2012	"Alaska: The Last Frontier (Theme)"	Atz Kilcher	—	—	Alaska: The Last Frontier - The Soundtrack
2016	"Free" (& Tristan Prettyman)	Anya Marina	—	—	

=== Soundtrack singles ===
Year	Title	Album
2007	"Quest for Love"	Arthur and the Invisibles
2007	"Anyone But You" (Live)	Nashville Star, Season 5
2010	"Stay Here Forever"	Valentine's Day

== Miscellaneous ==
=== Guest appearances ===
Year	Title	Artist	Album
2015	"Dress Blues"	Zac Brown Band	Jekyll and Hyde
2016	"I Want to Be a Cowboy's Sweetheart"	Cyndi Lauper	Detour

=== Tributes ===
- "You Make Loving Fun" (Legacy: A Tribute to Fleetwood Mac's Rumours)
- "Body On Body" (Johnny Cash: Forever Words)

=== Soundtracks ===
- "All By Myself" (Clueless - Not included on soundtrack CD)
- "Emily" (The Crossing Guard)
- "Sunshine Superman" (I Shot Andy Warhol), a Donovan cover
- "Under the Water" (The Craft)
- "Have a Little Faith in Me" (Phenomenon)
- "Foolish Games (Radio Mix)" (Batman & Robin)
- "What's Simple Is True" (Ride with the Devil)
- "Angel Standing By" ("Return to Me")
- "Sweet Home Alabama" (Sweet Home Alabama)
- "Quest for Love" (Arthur and the Invisibles)
- "Stay Here Forever" (Valentine's Day)
- "Alaska: The Last Frontier Theme Song (Acoustic)" (Alaska: The Last Frontier - The Soundtrack)
- "The Story" - from the American Song Contest

=== EP promos ===
- 1994: Save the Linoleum (PRCD 5999–2)
- 1994: Shiva Diva Doo-Wop (cassette)
- 1995: You Were Meant for Me aka Phyllis Barnabee Finally Gets a Bra (PRCD 6416–2)
- 1999: Bits and Baubles (CD)
- 2006: The Best of Jewel Unedited 2006 EP (CD)
- 2010: Sweet and Mild (cardsleeve CD)

== Videography ==
=== Home videos ===
Year	Title	Formats
1999	Jewel: A Life Uncommon	VHS/DVD
1999	Woodstock '99	Broadcast/streaming
2004	Live at Humphrey's by the Bay	DVD
2006	Goodbye Alice in Wonderland Limited Edition	CD+DVD
2008	The Essential Live Songbook	DVD/Blu-ray/download/streaming

=== Music videos ===
Year	Title	Director
1996	"Who Will Save Your Soul"	Geoff Moore
1996	"You Were Meant for Me"	Lawrence Carroll
1996	"You Were Meant for Me" (Juan Patino Mix)	Sean Penn
1997	"Foolish Games"	Matthew Rolston
1998	"Hands"	Nick Brandt
1999	"Down So Long"	Lawrence Carroll
1999	"What's Simple Is True"	Matthew Rolston
1999	"Jupiter (Swallow the Moon)"	Matthew Rolston
1999	"Gloria" (Joy Enhanced CD bonus)	Unknown
2001	"Standing Still"	Darren Grant
2001	"Break Me" (This Way Enhanced CD bonus version)	Unknown
2002	"Break Me"	Mike Lipscombe
2002	"This Way"	Marcos Efron
2003	"Intuition"	Marc Klasfeld
2003	"Stand"	Chris Applebaum/Brand New School
2006	"Goodbye Alice in Wonderland"	
2006	"Again and Again"	Matthew Rolston
2006	"Good Day"	Alan Ferguson
2006	"Stephenville, TX"	Jake Maymudes
2006	"Stephenville, TX" (Alternate Versions)	Kurt Markus
2007	"Quest for Love"	Isaac Mizrahi
2007	"Go Tell It on the Mountain" (featuring Toby Keith)	Michael Salomon
2008	"Stronger Woman"	Trey Fanjoy
2008	"I Do"	Peter Zavadil
2008	"Til It Feels Like Cheating"	Peter Zavadil
2010	"Stay Here Forever"	Peter Zavadil
2010	"Satisfied"	Peter Zavadil
2010	"No Good in Goodbye"	Justin Nolan Key
2010	"Ten"	Peter Zavadil
2013	"Two Hearts Breaking"	Mark Liddell
2015	"My Father's Daughter" (featuring Dolly Parton)	Tom Campbell
2016	"Pretty Faced Fool"	Adam Jones
2018	"Body On Body"	Unknown
2019	"No More Tears"	Adam VillaSeñor
2019	"Winter Wonderland" (Lyric Video)	Yellow Mouse Studios (animation)
2022	"Dancing Slow (feat. Train)" (Lyric Video)	unknown
2022	"Alaska (Maggie Rogers cover)"	unknown
