= Greatest Hits (Jewel album) =

Greatest hits album by Jewel
- Released: February 5, 2013
- Genre: Folk-pop; pop; pop rock; dance-pop; country; country pop
- Length: 65:31
- Label: Rhino
- Producer: Jewel; Ben Keith; Steve Poltz; Patrick Leonard; Dann Huff; John Kurzweg; Greg Wells; Jason Freese; John Rich; Nathan Chapman

Jewel chronology
The Merry Goes 'Round (2011)	Greatest Hits (2013)	Let It Snow: A Holiday Collection (2013)

Professional ratings
Review scores
Source	Rating
AllMusic	4/5 stars
Slant Magazine	3.5/5 stars

Greatest Hits is the first greatest hits album by American singer-songwriter Jewel. The album was released on February 5, 2013, and features duets from Kelly Clarkson and the Pistol Annies. It also contains one new recording, "Two Hearts Breaking".

== Track listing ==
All tracks are written by Jewel Kilcher, except where noted.

No.	Title	Writer(s)	Producer(s)	Length
1.	"Who Will Save Your Soul" (from Pieces of You, 1995)		Ben Keith	4:00
2.	"You Were Meant for Me" (from Pieces of You) (album edit)	Kilcher; Steve Poltz	Keith	3:49
3.	"Foolish Games" (from Pieces of You) (radio edit)		Keith	4:03
4.	"Hands" (from Spirit, 1998)	Kilcher; Patrick Leonard	Leonard	3:54
5.	"Down So Long" (from Spirit)		Leonard	4:19
6.	"Jupiter (Swallow the Moon)" (from Spirit) (single version)		Leonard	3:42
7.	"Standing Still" (from This Way, 2001)	Kilcher; Rick Nowels	Kilcher; Dann Huff; John Kurzweg	4:30
8.	"Break Me" (from This Way) (radio remix)		Kilcher; Huff	3:58
9.	"Intuition" (from 0304, 2003)	Kilcher; Lester Mendez	Kilcher; Mendez	3:49
10.	"Good Day" (from Goodbye Alice in Wonderland, 2006) (album version)	Kilcher; Kara DioGuardi; Greg Wells	Wells	3:44
11.	"Stronger Woman" (from Perfectly Clear, 2008) (radio edit)	Kilcher; Marv Green	John Rich	3:49
12.	"Somewhere Over the Rainbow" (from Lullaby, 2009)	Harold Arlen; E.Y. Harburg	Kilcher; Jason Freese	4:25
13.	"Satisfied" (from Sweet and Wild, 2010) (radio edit)	Kilcher; Liz Rose	Nathan Chapman	4:08
14.	"You Were Meant for Me" (featuring Pistol Annies)		Kilcher; Poltz	5:25
15.	"Foolish Games" (featuring Kelly Clarkson)			4:11
16.	"Two Hearts Breaking" (new recording)			3:45

== Chart performance ==
Chart (2013)	Peak position
US Billboard 200	73
