= Jupiter (Swallow the Moon) =

1999 single by Jewel

- Standard cover art

Single by Jewel

from the album Spirit
- B-side: "Deep Water" (live); "Emily"
- Released: June 28, 1999
- Studio: Groove Masters (Santa Monica, California)
- Genre: Folk (original); pop rock (radio version)
- Length: 4:18 (album version); 3:42 (radio remix)
- Label: Atlantic
- Songwriter: Jewel Kilcher
- Producers: Patrick Leonard (album version); Lou Giordano, Jewel (radio remix)

Jewel singles chronology
"Down So Long" (1999)	"Jupiter (Swallow the Moon)" (1999)	"What's Simple Is True" (1999)

"Jupiter" is a song by American singer Jewel, released in June 1999 as the third single from her second album, Spirit (1998). For the single release, Jewel re-recorded the vocals, co-produced the song with Lou Giordano, and changed the title to "Jupiter (Swallow the Moon)". A commercial single was issued in the United States and internationally, credited as the "radio version".

The single was a minor hit in the US, peaking at number 39 on the Billboard Adult Top 40. It performed better in Canada, reaching number 47 on the RPM Top Singles chart and number 42 on the RPM Adult Contemporary chart. The music video aired on MTV, MTV2 and VH1; MTV had an episode for the video in its "Making the Video" series.

== Critical reception ==
Chuck Taylor of Billboard magazine called "Jupiter (Swallow the Moon)" "simply splendid" and described it as a "savvy, harmony-rippled pop/rock finger-snapper", going to write that the song "embodies all that fans have come to love about Jewel."

== Music video ==
A music video, directed by Matthew Rolston, was released in 1999. In the beginning of the video, a flash of pictures are shown. Jewel is seen surrounded by neon lamps dancing and later seen sitting in a neon-lit forest at the end of the video.

== Track listings ==
US maxi-CD single

1. "Jupiter (Swallow the Moon)" – 3:30
2. "Deep Water" (live) – 3:47
3. "Emily" – 3:09

Australian CD single

1. "Jupiter (Swallow the Moon)" (radio remix) – 3:42
2. "Deep Water" (live acoustic) – 3:46
3. "Jupiter" (album version) – 4:18

== Credits and personnel ==
Credits are adapted from the Spirit album booklet and the US maxi-CD single liner notes.

Studios

- Recorded at Groove Masters (Santa Monica, California)
- Mixed at Oceanway (Hollywood, California)
- Mastered at Gateway Mastering (Portland, Maine, US)

Personnel

- Jewel – writing (as Jewel Kilcher), vocals, production (radio remix)
- Jude Cole – acoustic guitar
- James Harrah – acoustic guitar
- Paul Bushnell – bass
- Patrick Leonard – B3, programming, production (album version)
- Brian MacLeod – drums
- Luis Conte – percussion
- Lou Giordano – production (radio remix)
- Kevin Killen – mixing (album version)
- Chris Lord-Alge – mixing (radio remix)
- Ross Hogarth – engineering
- Bob Ludwig – mastering

== Charts ==
Chart (1999)	Peak position
Canada Top Singles (RPM)	47
Canada Adult Contemporary (RPM)	42
US Adult Pop Airplay (Billboard)	39

== Release history ==
Region	Date	Format(s)	Label(s)	Ref(s).
United States	June 28, 1999	Adult contemporary; hot adult contemporary; modern adult contemporary radio	Atlantic	
United States	June 29, 1999	Contemporary hit radio	Atlantic	
