= Let It Snow: A Holiday Collection =

Studio album by Jewel
- Released: September 24, 2013
- Genre: Christmas
- Length: 39:44
- Label: Reflections
- Producer: Jewel; Steve Skinner; Joe Mardin; Robbie Kondor

Jewel chronology
Greatest Hits (2013)	Let It Snow: A Holiday Collection (2013)	Picking Up the Pieces (2015)

Let It Snow: A Holiday Collection is the eleventh studio album and second full-length Christmas album from Jewel, released on September 24, 2013, through Reflections Records.

== Background ==
Jewel released her first Christmas album in 1999. Joy: A Holiday Collection was a commercial success, receiving Platinum certifications. The announcement of a second Christmas album came on August 6, 2013. In an interview with The Wall Street Journal about recording another Christmas album, Jewel was quoted as saying "I wanted this record to have a resemblance to the first album. It’s a continuation of mood and spirit of that record, with the mood and feel of the album artwork with an image and tone that evokes that spirit." According to her official website, the album "features country, folk-pop roots with a classical twist."

== Production ==
Let It Snow was recorded in 2013 and produced by Jewel, along with Steve Skinner, Joe Mardin and Robbie Kondor. Included with ten traditional holiday songs are two originals recorded for the album, titled "It's Christmastime" and "Blue Crystal Glow."

== Release ==
The album was released on September 24, 2013, and made available in several editions. The Target edition contains an exclusive track, "Deck The Halls." Bed Bath & Beyond and iTunes offer the deluxe edition, which includes four additional tracks.

== Critical reception ==
Professional ratings
Review scores
Source	Rating
AllMusic	3/5 stars

Let It Snow: A Holiday Collection has received mostly positive feedback from music critics. Stephen Thomas Erlewine of AllMusic writes, "(the album) may not transcend the conventions of a Christmas album, but it also avoids the pitfalls and, on the whole, it's better than her first foray into seasonal song."

== Commercial performance ==
As of August 2015, the album has sold 41,000 copies in the United States.

== Track listing ==
No.	Title	Writer(s)	Length
1.	"Let It Snow! Let It Snow! Let It Snow!"	Sammy Cahn, Jule Styne	2:23
2.	"Have Yourself a Merry Little Christmas"	Hugh Martin, Ralph Blane	3:28
3.	"Do You Hear What I Hear?"	Noël Regney, Gloria Shayne Baker	3:22
4.	"It's Christmastime"	Jewel Kilcher	3:41
5.	"What Child Is This?"	William Chatterton Dix	3:10
6.	"Panis angelicus"		3:57
7.	"Blue Crystal Glow"	Kilcher, Joe Mardin	2:03
8.	"Sleigh Ride"	Leroy Anderson, Mitchell Parish	3:21
9.	"White Christmas" (ft. Vince Gill on guitar)	Irving Berlin	3:34
10.	"Silver Bells"	Jay Livingston, Ray Evans	3:43
11.	"The Christmas Song"	Mel Tormé	3:39
12.	"I'll Be Home for Christmas"	Kim Gannon, Walter Kent, Buck Ram	3:19
Total length:			39:44

Let It Snow: A Holiday Collection – Deluxe version (bonus tracks)
No.	Title	Writer(s)	Length
13.	"God Rest Ye Merry, Gentlemen"	Traditional	3:08
14.	"Christmas in the Country"		3:35
15.	"Angels We Have Heard on High"	Traditional	4:11
16.	"It Came Upon a Midnight Clear"	Edmund Sears	3:45
Total length:			54:23

Let It Snow: A Holiday Collection – Target version (bonus track)
No.	Title	Writer(s)	Length
13.	"Deck the Halls"	Traditional	3:35
Total length:			43:19

== Personnel ==
Credits adapted from AllMusic

Musicians

- Jewel – acoustic guitar, vocals
- Robbie Kondor – bass, bass (vocal), clapping, harmonica, keyboards, knee slaps, mandolin, penny whistle, piano, vibraphone
- Joe Mardin – bass, brushes, cymbals, drums, keyboards, sleigh bells, tambourine, background vocals
- Amie Amis – French horn
- Eliot Bailen – cello
- Sherrod Barnes – acoustic guitar
- Mallory Bennhoff – background vocals
- Emily Bindiger – choir/chorus, background vocals
- Paul Brandenburg – trumpet
- Laurent Caillat – choir/chorus
- Larry Campbell – fiddle, guitar, pedal steel guitar
- John Clark – French horn
- Nancy Danino – choir/chorus, translation
- Nick Donohue – background vocals
- Dave Eggar – cello, soloist
- Gabrielle Fink – violin
- Vince Gill – guitar, soloist
- Rachel Golub – violin
- Julie Goodale – viola
- Nikki Gregoroff – background vocals
- Rebecca Harris – violin
- Stan Harrison – clarinet, saxophone
- Richard Heckman – English horn, oboe
- Erin Hill – harp
- Alexandra Jenkins – violin
- Marco Joachim – acoustic guitar
- Birch Johnson – trombone
- Zev Katz – bass
- Dillon Kondor – guitar
- Kenny Kosek – fiddle
- Katie Kresek – violin
- Ron Lawrence – viola
- Zoë Lewis – background vocals
- Michael Londra – choir/chorus, translation, background vocals
- Pat Mangan – violin
- Trevor Neumann – flugelhorn
- Victoria Paterson – violin
- Sophie Piggott – background vocals
- Marcus Rojas – tuba
- Peter Sachon – cello
- Daniel Sadownick – djembe, shaker, triangle
- Laura Sherman – harp
- Ira Siegel – guitar
- Abi Sirota – background vocals
- Sam Skinner – guitar
- Steve Skinner – keyboards, organ, piano, sleigh bells
- Frank Vilardi – clapping, drums, knee slaps

Technical

- Jewel – arranger, executive producer, production
- Robbie Kondor – arranger, conductor, engineer, production
- Joe Mardin – arranger, engineer, mixing, production, programming, vocal arrangement
- Steve Skinner – arranger, engineer, main personnel, production, programming
- Michael O'Reilly – engineer, mixing
- Seth Glassman – engineer
- Ken Halford – engineer
- Roy Hendrickson – engineer
- Kabir Hermon – engineer
- Mike Nolan – engineer
- Matt Rausch – engineer
- Alan Silverman – mastering
- Katie Kresek – concertmaster
- Tom Chaggaris – art direction
- Virginia Davis – management
- Dave Eggar – contractor
- Russell James – photography
- Nicole Perez – publicity

== Charts ==
Chart (2014)	Peak position
US Billboard 200	43
US Top Holiday Albums (Billboard)	20
US Independent Albums (Billboard)	7
