= Down So Long =

1999 single by Jewel

- Artwork for retail UK and European releases

Single by Jewel

from the album Spirit
- B-side: "Fat Boy" (live); "I'm Sensitive" (live)
- Released: March 16, 1999
- Studio: Groove Masters (Santa Monica, California); Ocean Way Recording (Hollywood, California)
- Length: 4:19 (album version); 4:20 (radio remix)
- Label: Atlantic
- Songwriter: Jewel Kilcher
- Producer: Patrick Leonard

Jewel singles chronology
"Hands" (1998)	"Down So Long" (1999)	"Jupiter (Swallow the Moon)" (1999)

"Down So Long" is a song written by American singer Jewel and produced by Patrick Leonard for Jewel's second album, Spirit (1998). Jewel wrote the song in 1992, when she was 18 years old. This was the second single that Jewel had not re-recorded vocals for its single release. The single release received a slight change in the instrumental and was released on March 16, 1999. The song entered the top 10 on two US Billboard charts and in Canada.

== Chart performance ==
"Down So Long" peaked at number 59 on the US Billboard Hot 100 chart, as well as number 10 on the Billboard Adult Top 40 and number nine on the Billboard Triple-A chart. Internationally, "Down So Long" charted in the United Kingdom and New Zealand, reaching numbers 38 and 16, respectively. In Canada, the song reached number seven, becoming the second top-10 single from Spirit after the number-one single "Hands". It also reached number seven on Canada's Adult Contemporary chart.

== Live performances ==
"Down So Long" was performed live for the first time on Saturday Night Live on November 14, 1998. In 2023, the 25th anniversary edition of Spirit was released, which includes a live recording of Down So Long from Colegio Oficial de Medicos de Madrid in Spain in 1999.

== Track listings ==
UK CD single

1. "Down So Long"
2. "Fat Boy" (live)
3. "I'm Sensitive" (live)

European CD single

1. "Down So Long"
2. "Fat Boy" (live)

== Credits and personnel ==
Credits are adapted from the Spirit album booklet.

Studios

- Recorded at Groove Masters (Santa Monica, California) and Ocean Way Recording (Hollywood, California)
- Mixed at Ocean Way Recording (Hollywood, California)
- Mastered at Gateway Mastering (Portland, Maine, US)

Personnel

- Jewel Kilcher – writing, vocals
- Patrick Leonard – electric piano, production
- Jude Cole – acoustic guitar
- James Harrah – electric guitar
- David Channing – electric guitar
- Josh Clayton-Felt – electric guitar
- Paul Bushnell – bass
- Brian MacLeod – drums
- Luis Conte – percussion
- Ross Hogarth – engineering, mixing
- Bob Ludwig – mastering

== Charts ==
=== Weekly charts ===
Chart (1999)	Peak position
Australia (ARIA)	115
Canada Top Singles (RPM)	7
Canada Adult Contemporary (RPM)	7
New Zealand (Recorded Music NZ)	16
Scottish Singles Sales (Official Charts)	42
UK Singles (Official Charts)	38
US Billboard Hot 100	59
US Adult Alternative Airplay (Billboard)	9
US Adult Pop Airplay (Billboard)	10
US Pop Airplay (Billboard)	21

=== Year-end charts ===
Chart (1999)	Position
Canada Top Singles (RPM)	60
Canada Adult Contemporary (RPM)	63
US Adult Top 40 (Billboard)	47

== Release history ==
Region	Date	Format(s)	Label(s)	Ref.
United States	March 16, 1999	Contemporary hit radio	Atlantic	
United Kingdom	June 14, 1999	CD; cassette	Atlantic	
