= The Merry Goes 'Round =

Studio album by Jewel
- Released: September 27, 2011
- Recorded: Fall 2010–spring 2011
- Genre: Children's music; pop
- Length: 61:01
- Label: Fisher-Price

Jewel chronology
| Sweet and Wild (2010) | The Merry Goes 'Round (2011) | Greatest Hits (2013) |

The Merry Goes 'Round is the tenth studio album by American recording artist Jewel. Released on September 27, 2011 on the Fisher-Price label, The Merry Goes 'Round is the follow-up album to Lullaby, Jewel's first album of children's songs. According to Jewel, the songs are "not just for children, but also adults".

The album was released a few months after Jewel gave birth to her first child, Kase Townes Murray. Speaking of her life as a new mother, Jewel noted, "No matter how much you get in life professionally, nothing in life compares to that sheer beauty and purity of your child." The album offers a diverse set of songs, from "back porch singalongs" to jazz-based melodies to traditional folk songs.

== Reception ==
Professional ratings
Review scores
| Source | Rating |
|---|---|
| AllMusic | 3.5/5 stars |

The Merry Goes 'Round received three and a half out of five stars on the AllMusic website. James Christopher Monger described the songs as "mostly original, country-folk kids' songs that are sweet and silly enough to hold the attention of a roomful of little ones, and breezy and folksy enough to keep their parents from launching a sippy cup into the speakers".

== Track listing ==
All songs were written by Jewel and Patrick Davis except where noted.

1. "Sammy the Spider" – 4:47
2. "Supermarket Song" – 3:36
3. "Just Like Penguins Do" – 4:39
4. "Bucky the Bull" – 4:32
5. "She'll Be Coming 'Round the Mountain" (Traditional) – 2:26
6. "Sara Swan Sleepy Head" – 4:32
7. "Play Day" – 3:12
8. "Only Shadows" – 3:18
9. "Oh! Susanna" (Stephen Foster) – 2:22
10. "Give Me the Rainbow" – 4:08
11. "My Favorite Things" (Richard Rodgers, Oscar Hammerstein II) – 3:46
12. "And the Green Grass Grows All Around" (William Jerome, Harry Von Tilzer) – 4:09
13. "Snooze Button Blues" – 3:30
14. "Happy" – 3:55
15. "In My Room" – 3:55
16. "Count on Me" – 4:41

== Personnel ==
- Jewel – vocals, guitar
