= Joy: A Holiday Collection =

Studio album (Christmas) by Jewel
- Released: November 2, 1999
- Recorded: June–September 1999
- Studio: Right Track Recording (New York City): Sound on Sound (New York City)
- Genre: Christmas
- Length: 44:31
- Label: Atlantic
- Producer: Arif Mardin; Joe Mardin

Jewel chronology
| Spirit (1998) | Joy: A Holiday Collection (1999) | This Way (2001) |

Professional ratings
Review scores
| Source | Rating |
|---|---|
| AllMusic | 3/5 stars |
| Chicago Tribune | (mixed) |
| Entertainment Weekly | C+ |

Joy: A Holiday Collection is the third studio album and first Christmas album by American singer-songwriter Jewel, released on November 2, 1999, through Atlantic Records. The radio-only single, "Joy to the World", was released in November the same year. Described as "an unashamed classicist Christmas album, featuring all of the usual carols delivered with strings and choirs", the album received platinum certifications in December 1999, and has sold 1,121,000 copies as of October 2013.

== Track listing ==
| No. | Title | Writer(s) | Length |
|---|---|---|---|
| 1. | "Joy to the World" | Lowell Mason, Isaac Watts | 3:05 |
| 2. | "O Holy Night" | Adolphe Adam, John Sullivan Dwight | 3:44 |
| 3. | "Silent Night" | Franz Gruber, Joseph Mohr | 3:07 |
| 4. | "Winter Wonderland" | Felix Bernard, Richard B. Smith | 3:39 |
| 5. | "O Little Town of Bethlehem" | Phillips Brooks, Lewis Redner | 3:11 |
| 6. | "Ave Maria" | Johann Sebastian Bach, Charles Gounod | 3:44 |
| 7. | "Hark! The Herald Angels Sing" | Felix Mendelssohn, Charles Wesley | 3:21 |
| 8. | "Rudolph the Red-Nosed Reindeer" | Johnny Marks | 1:53 |
| 9. | "Face of Love" | Jewel | 3:27 |
| 10. | "Medley: Go Tell It on the Mountain/Life Uncommon/From a Distance" | Traditional, Jewel, Julie Gold | 6:31 |
| 11. | "I Wonder as I Wander" | John Jacob Niles | 1:58 |
| 12. | "Gloria" | Jewel | 2:38 |
| 13. | "Hands" (Christmas version) | Jewel, Patrick Leonard | 4:13 |
| Total length: | | | 44:31 |

Joy: A Holiday Collection – Australian and Japanese Bonus Track
| No. | Title | Length |
|---|---|---|
| 14. | "Life Uncommon (Live)" |

== Personnel ==
Credits adapted from AllMusic.

Musicians

- Jewel – vocals, harmony vocals
- Tawatha Agee – choir, chorus
- Andre Baranowski
- Terrance L. Barber Jr. – choir, chorus
- Jerry Barnes – bass guitar, choir, chorus
- Katreese Barnes – choir, chorus
- Marion Beckenstein – choir, chorus
- Peter Bliss – guitar
- Danny Blume – guitar
- Ann Ory Brown – choir, chorus
- Sophie Buskin – children's chorus
- Larry Campbell – pedal steel guitar
- Sterling Campbell – drums
- Lenedra Carroll – vocals, harmony vocals
- Vivian Cherry – choir, chorus
- Dennis Cinelli – lute
- Angela Clemmons-Patrick – choir, chorus
- Dennis Collins – choir, chorus
- Patrick Duffey – children's chorus
- Emily K. Eyre – choir, chorus
- Keith Fluitt – choir, chorus
- Gloria Gabriel – coordination
- Katie Geissinger – choir, chorus
- Diva Gray – choir, chorus
- Wayne Hankin – choir, chorus
- Netousha Harris – children's chorus
- Alexis Kaleoff – children's chorus
- Robbie Kondor – piano, keyboard
- Mary Lee Kortes – background vocals, choir, chorus
- Robbi Kumalo – choir, chorus
- Cassidy Ladden – children's chorus
- John Mahoney – keyboard
- Arif Mardin – keyboard
- Joe Mardin – keyboard, choir, chorus
- Audrey Martells – choir, chorus
- Willie Martinez – percussion
- Chieli Minucci – guitar
- Lee Musiker – keyboard
- Michael O'Reilly – guitar
- Gene Orloff – concertmaster
- Wayne Pedzwater – bass guitar
- Shawn Pelton – drums
- Janice Pendarvis – choir, chorus
- Leon Pendarvis – piano
- Russell Powell - guitar
- Sophia Ramos – background vocals, choir, chorus
- Eden Riegel – children's chorus
- Winston Roye – bass guitar
- Dakota Sanchez – children's chorus
- Marlon Saunders – choir, chorus
- Ira Siegel – guitar
- Steve Skinner – keyboard
- Allison M. Sniffin – choir, chorus
- Elizabeth Stockton
- Vaneese Thomas – choir, chorus
- Fonzi Thornton – choir, chorus
- Darryl Tookes – choir, chorus
- Christopher Trousdale – children's chorus
- Lori Ann Velez – choir, chorus
- Audrey Wheeler – choir, chorus
- James D-Train Williams – choir, chorus
- Ken Williams – choir, chorus
- Valerie Wilson – background vocals, choir, chorus
- Lisbeth Zelle – children's chorus
- Harry Zittel – children's chorus

Technical

- Jewel – vocal arrangement
- Arif Mardin – record producer, arranger, choir arrangement, conductor, orchestration, string arrangements, vocal arrangement
- Joe Mardin – arranger, choir arrangement, conductor, orchestration, production, programming, vocal arrangement
- Jerry Barnes – choir arrangement, vocal arrangement
- Katreese Barnes – choir arrangement, vocal arrangement
- Jennifer Baumann – photography
- Lenedra Carroll – vocal arrangement
- Rob Eberhardt – illustrations
- Max Feldman – assistant engineer
- Gloria Gabriel – production, production coordination
- West Kennerly – photography
- Robbie Kondor – orchestration, programming, synthesizer programming
- George Marino – mastering
- Lee Musiker – arranger
- Benjamin Niles – art direction, artwork
- Michael O'Reilly – engineer, mixing
- Gene Orloff – concertmaster
- Steve Skinner – arranger, orchestration, programming, synthesizer programming
- Jason Stasium – assistant engineer

== Chart performance ==
| Chart (1999–2000) | Peak position |
|---|---|
| Australian Albums (ARIA) | 61 |
| Japanese Albums Chart | 67 |
| US Billboard 200 | 32 |
| US Top Holiday Albums (Billboard) | 2 |
| US Top Catalog Albums (Billboard) | 5 |
| Billboard Top Internet Albums | 7 |

=== End-of-year charts ===
| Chart (2000) | Position |
|---|---|
| US Billboard 200 | 173 |

== Certifications ==
| Region | Certification | Certified units/sales |
|---|---|---|
| United States (RIAA) | Platinum | 1,121,000 |
