= Hands (Jewel song) =

1998 single by Jewel

Single by Jewel

from the album Spirit
- B-side: "Innocence Maintained"; "Enter from the East" (acoustic)
- Released: October 7, 1998
- Studio: Groove Masters (Santa Monica, California)
- Length: 3:54 (album version); 3:47 (radio edit)
- Label: Atlantic
- Composers: Jewel Kilcher; Patrick Leonard
- Lyricist: Jewel Kilcher
- Producer: Patrick Leonard

Jewel singles chronology
"Morning Song" (1998)	"Hands" (1998)	"Down So Long" (1999)

Music video
- "Hands" on YouTube

"Hands" is a song by American singer-songwriter Jewel, released as the first single from her second studio album, Spirit (1998). Jewel wrote the song following an incident in which she considered stealing a sundress after getting fired from various jobs due to kidney troubles, and she decided that her hands were better suited to writing songs than stealing clothes. Written as one of the last songs for the album, the lyrics express how the smallest decisions have the power to make change. A piano-driven ballad, the song was serviced to American radio stations on October 7, 1998, ahead of its planned release date in mid-October due to a radio leak in Dallas, Texas.

No commercial single was issued in the United States, and the singles that were issued internationally received the album version. The radio edit can be found only on promos for the single. Even without a commercial US release, the song reached number six on the Billboard Hot 100 chart, and the video peaked atop VH1's Top 20 Countdown. "Hands" also reached number one in Canada for one week and peaked within the top 30 in Australia, the Netherlands, and New Zealand. A "Christmas" version of the song appears on Joy: A Holiday Collection.

== Background ==
In 2002, Jewel elaborated on the song's origin. Before she wrote "Hands", she experienced kidney troubles that prevented her from working, and as a result, she was fired from several successive jobs, sending her into poverty. She began to shoplift food but worried she would begin to steal more expensive items. One day, she noticed a sundress in a shop window and went inside to try it on, planning to steal it. However, when she noticed the price tag, she decided against it. She explained:

I had the price tag in my hand and it was one of those moments in my life, like a lightning bolt struck me, it was $39.99 and I thought "when did I lose faith in myself? When did I start thinking that I can't earn $40 for myself?"

Jewel quickly left the store, leaving the dress behind, and began to write "Hands" soon afterwards, referring to her own hands that would function better writing songs than stealing dresses. It was one of the final tracks written and recorded for Spirit. The central lyrics that developed into the complete song were, "If you watch what your hands are doing, you can see where your life is going to go."

== Composition and lyrics ==
Ilana Kaplan of The New York Times has described "Hands" as a ballad. The album version is three minutes and fifty-four seconds long while the radio edit is three minutes and forty-seven seconds. According to the digital sheet music published at Musicnotes, the song is written in cut time (2/2) in the key of F minor with a moderate tempo of 68 beats per minute. The lyrics of "Hands" say that all people have the power to make their own decisions and change their lives for the better as long as they keep watch on what their hands are doing. It is also about how the smallest actions can cause a difference. Jewel explained, "I knew if I could tell the world, my hands are so little, how can they have impact on the world? They seem like tiny little weapons. I can't fight with despair, thoughtlessness. They're not the solution, but they are the first step forward."

== Release ==
Atlantic Records originally planned to ship "Hands" to US radio sometime in mid-October, with possible impact dates being the 12th, the 16th, or the 19th. However, KHKS—a radio station in Dallas, Texas—obtained a copy of the song and began to air it. KHKS then distributed the single to other radio stations owned by the Chancellor Media Group, and "Hands" rapidly began to spread to other stations nationwide, including 118 monitored by Billboard. Because of this leak, Atlantic decided to rush-release promotional discs and move the official radio release forward to October 7. No commercial formats were released in the US.

The first commercial single of "Hands" was issued in the United Kingdom on November 9, 1998; it was distributed across two CD singles. The first CD contains two B-sides: "Innocence Maintained" and an acoustic version of "Enter from the East", while the second CD features live versions of two previous singles by Jewel: "Who Will Save Your Soul" and "You Were Meant for Me". In Japan, a CD single with the same track listing was released on November 26, 1998. This CD was also distributed in Australia. In Germany, a different CD single was issued, containing only the acoustic version of "Enter from the East" as an extra track.

== Critical reception ==
Chuck Taylor of Billboard noted how Jewel's lyrics were "less girlish" and "creamier and more robust" than her debut efforts on "Hands" and called the track "one hell of a new single". Music Week named it the "Single of the Week" on their October 24, 1998, issue, describing the song as "delicious" and its chorus as "moving". Conversely, AllMusic reviewer Stephen Thomas Erlewine referred to the song's lyrics as "startlingly naive".

== Chart performance ==
"Hands" debuted on the US Billboard Hot 100 chart at number 24 on December 5, 1998, the same week that Billboard changed its chart rules to finally allow songs to chart even if they were not released as a commercial single. The song spent 16 weeks on the chart, peaking at number six on January 23, 1999.

== Music video ==
The music video for "Hands", directed by Nick Brandt, was filmed at the Promenade apartment complex in West Covina, California on October 11 and 12, 1998. It begins with Jewel driving along on a rainy night when she comes across emergency workers responding to a collapsed apartment building. She gets out of her car and stands with the crowd looking at the rubble and notices other onlookers walking away in horror and hopelessness. She follows others into the rubble and helps dig through the rubble for survivors, finding a man, alive, under the rubble and later three young children trapped inside a room. Throughout the whole video, she remains calm and collected, full of hope, as chaos ensues around her.

== September 11 remix ==
Right after the September 11 attacks, a DJ remixed the song which was carried on stations across the country. During the attacks, Jewel had been camping in the woods with her husband and did not hear news of the attacks until September 14, when a radio DJ dedicated "Hands" to those affected by the attacks. She spoke of this experience at a Borders concert in Ann Arbor, Michigan prior to the release of Perfectly Clear. Jewel appeared on Late Show with David Letterman one week after the incident, on September 18, 2001, and performed this song instead of the previously scheduled "Standing Still."

== Track listings ==
Australian and Japanese CD single; UK CD1

1. "Hands" – 3:47
2. "Innocence Maintained" – 4:08
3. "Enter from the East" (acoustic) – 4:01

UK CD2

1. "Hands" – 3:47
2. "Who Will Save Your Soul" (live) – 4:08
3. "You Were Meant for Me" (live) – 4:01

German CD single

1. "Hands" – 3:47
2. "Enter from the East" (acoustic) – 4:01

== Credits and personnel ==
Credits are adapted from the German CD single liner notes and the Spirit album booklet.

Studios

- Recorded and engineered at Groove Masters (Santa Monica, California)
- Mixed at Ocean Way Recording (Hollywood, California)
- Mastered at Gateway Mastering (Portland, Maine, US)

Personnel

- Jewel Kilcher – lyrics, music, vocals, backing vocals
- Patrick Leonard – music, piano and keyboards, production
- Nedra Carroll – backing vocals
- Brian MacLeod – drums and hand drum
- Luis Conte – percussion
- Paul Bushnell – bass
- Jude Cole – acoustic guitar
- James Harrah – electric guitar
- Ross Hogarth – engineering
- Bob Salcedo – engineering assistance
- Sebastian Haimerl – engineering assistance
- Kevin Killen – mixing
- John Sorenson – mix engineering assistance
- Robi Banerji – mix engineering assistance
- David Channing – technical assistance
- Bob Ludwig – mastering
- Brenda Rotheiser – art direction
- Matthew Rolston – photography

== Charts ==
=== Weekly charts ===
Chart (1998–1999)	Peak position
Australia (ARIA)	25
Canada Top Singles (RPM)	1
Canada Adult Contemporary (RPM)	1
Europe (Eurochart Hot 100)	93
France (SNEP)	96
Netherlands (Dutch Top 40)	27
Netherlands (Single Top 100)	35
New Zealand (Recorded Music NZ)	19
Scottish Singles Sales (Official Charts)	35
UK Singles (Official Charts)	41
US Billboard Hot 100	6
US Adult Alternative Airplay (Billboard)	3
US Adult Contemporary (Billboard)	7
US Adult Pop Airplay (Billboard)	2
US Pop Airplay (Billboard)	4

=== Year-end charts ===
Chart (1998)	Position
Canada Adult Contemporary (RPM)	33
US Adult Top 40 (Billboard)	68
US Mainstream Top 40 (Billboard)	96

Chart (1999)	Position
Canada Top Singles (RPM)	31
Canada Adult Contemporary (RPM)	8
US Billboard Hot 100	54
US Adult Contemporary (Billboard)	21
US Adult Top 40 (Billboard)	12
US Mainstream Top 40 (Billboard)	41
US Triple-A (Billboard)	16

== Certifications ==
Region	Certification	Certified units/sales
Australia (ARIA)	Gold	35,000^{^}
^{^} Shipments figures based on certification alone.

== Release history ==
Region	Date	Format(s)	Label(s)	Ref.
United States	October 7, 1998	Radio	Atlantic	
United Kingdom	November 9, 1998	CD	Atlantic	
Japan	November 26, 1998	CD	Atlantic; EastWest Japan	
