= Lullaby (Jewel album) =

Studio album by Jewel
- Released: May 5, 2009
- Recorded: December 2008 (over holiday season)–March 2009 Jewel's home studio
- Genre: Children's music
- Length: 58:22
- Labels: Fisher-Price; Somerset
- Producers: Jewel Kilcher; Jason Freese

Jewel chronology
Perfectly Clear (2008)	Lullaby (2009)	Sweet and Wild (2010)

Singles from Lullaby
- 1. "Somewhere Over the Rainbow" Released: 2009

Professional ratings
Review scores
Source	Rating
Allmusic	3/5 stars

Lullaby is the eighth studio album and debut children's album by American recording artist Jewel, released on May 5, 2009 by Somerset Entertainment, through Fisher-Price Records. It is her first-ever independent release. The album has sold 37,000 copies in the United States as of June 2010. This CD contains 15 tracks.

== Background ==
Produced by Jewel and recorded at the singer's home studio in Stephenville, Texas, Lullaby contains 10 self-penned songs as well as covers of popular nursery rhymes and lullabies. Jewel stated:

"This isn't just a 'kids' album, it's really a mood album—perfect to relax to at the end of a long day. It will soothe and lull children, but was also written and sung for adults to enjoy and unwind with."

== Promotion ==
In support of the album Jewel appeared on Live with Regis and Kelly, The Tonight Show with Jay Leno, Today, The Bonnie Hunt Show, and more.

== Track listing ==
1. "Raven" – 4:07
2. "All the Animals" – 2:46
3. "Sweet Dreams" – 4:16
4. "Twinkle Twinkle Little Star" – 3:04
5. "Circle Song" – 3:47
6. "The Cowboy's Lament" – 3:59
7. "Daydream Land" – 3:10
8. "Sov Gott (Sleep Well)" – 4:44
9. "Dreamer" – 4:23
10. "Forever and a Day (Always)" – 3:15
11. "Gloria" – 6:09
12. "Somewhere Over the Rainbow" – 4:25
13. "Angel Standing By" – 2:45
14. "Simple Gifts" – 2:47
15. "Brahms Lullaby" – 4:45

== Personnel ==
- Jonathan Ahrens - upright bass
- Jason Freese - accordion, mellotron, piano, triangle
- Ken Halford - acoustic guitar
- Jewel - acoustic guitar, lead vocals, background vocals
- Jonathan Yudkin - bass guitar, cello, celtic harp, charango, flute, acoustic guitar, mandolin, peruvian flute, shruti box, string arrangements, string bass, string composer, viola, violin

== Charts ==
Chart (2009)	Peak position
US Billboard 200	117
US Independent Albums	13
US Kids Albums	1

== Certifications ==
Region	Certification	Certified units/sales
Canada (Music Canada)	Gold	40,000^{^}
^{^} Shipments figures based on certification alone.
