= Standing Still (Jewel song) =

2001 single by Jewel

Single by Jewel

from the album This Way
- B-side: "Grey Matter" (live)
- Released: September 24, 2001
- Studio: Ocean Way; Emerald Entertainment; The Sound Kitchen (Nashville, Tennessee)
- Genre: Folk-pop
- Length: 4:30 (album version); 3:58 (radio edit)
- Label: Atlantic
- Composer: Jewel Kilcher
- Lyricists: Jewel Kilcher; Rick Nowels
- Producers: Jewel Kilcher; Dann Huff

Jewel singles chronology
"Life Uncommon" (1999)	"Standing Still" (2001)	"Break Me" (2002)

"Standing Still" is a song by American singer-songwriter Jewel. Recorded in Nashville, Tennessee, the song was included on her fourth studio album, This Way (2001). Jewel wrote the song sometime after the release of her previous album, Spirit, while she was taking a break from her music career. According to Jewel, the song is about stepping back to avoid stagnation from a busy career and wanting a change of scenery from fame.

"Standing Still" was released on September 24, 2001, to positive reviews and commercial success. In the United States, it peaked at number 25 on the Billboard Hot 100 in February 2002 and reached the top 10 on the Billboard Triple-A and Adult Top 40 charts. Worldwide, the single reached the top 40 in Australia, Canada, the Netherlands, and New Zealand. In New Zealand, it peaked at number seven and was the 40th-most-successful single of 2002.

== Background and release ==
Jewel revealed the meaning behind "Standing Still" backstage at the 2001 My VH1 Music Awards:

"It's about the irony of how much a person travels in my job, and how it can really cause your emotional life to stand still. Fame really tolerates a prolonged adolescence, and your fame and career can outgrow your ability to handle it. You can really spoiled, and I wanted to get away from [that] and make sure I wasn't standing still".

Jewel went on to explain that the song was inspired by her three-year hiatus from the music business following the release of Spirit (1998), during which she found it difficult to stay impassioned about her fame. Chuck Taylor of Billboard magazine summarized that the song "addresses simple desires [...] with an underlying message about taking forward steps in life", as well as "stepping out and embracing life".

Jewel recorded the song at three studios in Nashville, Tennessee: Ocean Way Nashville, Emerald Entertainment, and the Sound Kitchen. The song was serviced to American hot adult contemporary radio on September 24, 2001, and was sent to contemporary hit radio (CHR) the following day. In Australia, a CD single was released on October 22, 2001, containing live versions of "A Long Slow Slide" and "Stephenville, TX". The same disc was issued in Japan two days later, while in the United Kingdom, a CD single was released on March 11, 2002.

== Composition ==
"Standing Still" is a folk-pop song. According to the sheet music published at Musicnotes, the song is written in the key of D major and has a moderately fast tempo of 124 beats per minute, in common time. The album version of the song is four minutes and 30 seconds long.

== Critical reception ==
Taylor called "Standing Still" a "jaunty but sophisticated outing, rich in its evolving textures and guitar-fueled folk-pop base".

== Chart performance ==
"Standing Still" first charted on the US Billboard Hot 100 on November 17, 2001, debuting at number 71. After 13 weeks, on the issue of February 16, 2002, it reached its peak of number 25, and it spent a total of 20 weeks in the top 100. It charted the highest on the Billboard Adult Top 40 Tracks ranking, rising to number three on February 2, 2002, and it peaked inside the top 20 on the Billboard Triple-A and Adult Contemporary listings. In addition, it reached number 22 on the Billboard Mainstream Top 40. At the end of 2002, Billboard ranked the track at number 87 on its year-end chart. In Canada, the single reached number 12 on the Nielsen BDS CHR chart.

The song also found success internationally. In Australia, it debuted at number 39 on the ARIA Singles Chart on November 4, 2001. Two weeks later, it peaked at number 32 and spent eight more nonconsecutive weeks in the top 50. On November 18, 2001, "Standing Still" entered the New Zealand Singles Chart at number 40, reaching its peak of number seven on January 20 and February 10, 2002. It stayed on the listing for 22 weeks and went on to become New Zealand's 40th-most-successful hit of 2002. In Europe, the song peaked at number 32 on the Dutch Top 40, number 11 on Flanders' Ultratip Bubbling Under chart, and number 83 on the UK Singles Chart.

== Track listings ==
US 7-inch single

A. "Standing Still" – 4:29
B. "Grey Matter" (live) – 4:35

European, Australian, and Japanese CD single

1. "Standing Still" – 4:30
2. "A Long Slow Slide" (live) – 3:50
3. "Stephenville, TX" (live) – 4:07

== Credits and personnel ==
Credits are taken from the European CD single liner notes.

Studios

- Recorded at Ocean Way Nashville, Emerald Entertainment, and the Sound Kitchen (Nashville, Tennessee)
- Mixed at Emerald Entertainment (Nashville, Tennessee)
- Mastered at the Mastering Lab (Hollywood, California, US)

Personnel

- Jewel Kilcher – lyrics, music, vocals, production
- Rick Nowels – music
- John Willis – acoustic guitar
- Dann Huff – electric guitar, production
- Jerry McPherson – electric guitar
- Jimmie Sloas – bass
- Chris McHugh – drums
- Eric Darken – percussion
- Tim Akers – keyboards
- Jeff Balding – recording and mixing
- Doug Sax – mastering
- Robert Hadley – mastering
- Lenedra Carroll – executive production
- Ron Shapiro – executive production
- Chad Farmer – art direction and design
- Lambesis Agency – art direction and design
- Ellen von Unwerth – photography

== Charts ==
=== Weekly charts ===
Weekly chart performance for "Standing Still"
Chart (2001–2002)	Peak position
Australia (ARIA)	32
Belgium (Ultratip Bubbling Under Flanders)	11
Canada CHR (Nielsen BDS)	12
Netherlands (Dutch Top 40)	32
Netherlands (Single Top 100)	68
New Zealand (Recorded Music NZ)	7
Scottish Singles Sales (Official Charts)	100
UK Singles (Official Charts)	83
US Billboard Hot 100	25
US Adult Alternative Airplay (Billboard)	10
US Adult Contemporary (Billboard)	19
US Adult Pop Airplay (Billboard)	3
US Pop Airplay (Billboard)	22

=== Year-end charts ===
2001 year-end chart performance for "Standing Still"
Chart (2001)	Position
US Adult Top 40 (Billboard)	69

2002 year-end chart performance for "Standing Still"
Chart (2002)	Position
Canada Radio (Nielsen BDS)	34
New Zealand (RIANZ)	40
US Billboard Hot 100	87
US Adult Contemporary (Billboard)	43
US Adult Top 40 (Billboard)	8
US Mainstream Top 40 (Billboard)	72
US Triple-A (Billboard)	49

== Release history ==
Release dates and formats for "Standing Still"
Region	Date	Format(s)	Label(s)	Ref.
United States	September 24, 2001	Hot adult contemporary radio	Atlantic	
United States	September 25, 2001	Contemporary hit radio	Atlantic	
Australia	October 22, 2001	CD	Atlantic	
Japan	October 24, 2001	CD	Atlantic	
United Kingdom	March 11, 2002	CD	Atlantic	
