= Spirit (Jewel album) =

Studio album by Jewel
- Released: November 17, 1998
- Recorded: 1998
- Studios: Groove Masters (Santa Monica, California); Ocean Way (Hollywood)
- Genre: Folk rock
- Length: 54:12
- Label: Atlantic
- Producers: Peter Collins; Patrick Leonard

Jewel chronology
| Pieces of You (1995) | Spirit (1998) | Joy: A Holiday Collection (1999) |

Singles from Spirit
- 1. "Hands" Released: October 7, 1998; 2. "Down So Long" Released: March 16, 1999; 3. "Jupiter" Released: June 28, 1999; 4. "What's Simple Is True" Released: October 25, 1999; 5. "Life Uncommon" Released: April 13, 2000

Spirit is the second studio album by American singer-songwriter Jewel, released on November 17, 1998, by Atlantic Records. Singles include "Hands", "Down So Long", and a newly recorded version of "Jupiter", followed by a remix of "What's Simple Is True" to promote Jewel's debut film Ride with the Devil. In addition, a one-track CD containing a live version of "Life Uncommon" was released to music stores in hopes to raise money and awareness for Habitat for Humanity.

Spirit debuted at number three on the Billboard 200 with 368,000 copies sold in its first week. It went on to sell 3.7 million units in the United States.

== Composition ==
Jewel Kilcher began writing material for Spirit after the release of Pieces of You in 1995. In 1996, she recorded six songs with producer Peter Collins, but scrapped the tracks after singles from her debut album, Pieces of You, began to receive significant radio play.

In a 1998 interview, she divulged that the song "Fat Boy" was written about a boy she grew up with who committed suicide on her family's property in Alaska: "There was a note [he left] that said some thing along the lines of, 'Nobody will love me,.' And to know that you're not sexually attractive in our society at age thirteen or to feel that you won't ever be loved at age eighteen is just devastating." She also stated that the song "Hands" was written based on the notion of: "if I watch what my hands do, I'd have a better idea of what I was thinking, consciously or subconsciously."

== Recording ==
Spirit was recorded at Groove Masters in Santa Monica, California, and Ocean Way Recording in Hollywood. Jewel recorded the album with producer Patrick Leonard (who frequently had worked with Madonna), who added percussive undercurrents and keyboards to the guitar-based tracks.

== Reception ==
Professional ratings
Review scores
| Source | Rating |
|---|---|
| AllMusic | 3/5 stars |
| American Songwriter | 4/5 stars |
| Entertainment Weekly | B− |
| The Guardian | 3/5 stars |
| Los Angeles Times | 2/4 stars |
| NME | 1/10 |
| Q | 3/5 stars |
| Rolling Stone | 3/5 stars |
| Spin | 4/10 |
| USA Today | 3/4 stars |

David Browne of Entertainment Weekly wrote of the album: "With her dulcet voice and lulling refrains, Jewel makes the social and political ills of the world go down easy. But in doing so, she unintentionally confounds the problem, since her honeyed background-music folk makes issues of life and death appear more benign and less worrisome than they are. Jewel truly has brought topical folk songs into the modern age: She makes complacent rabble-rousers." Rolling Stone's Rob Sheffield felt that while "Jewel's sincere sentiment has its attractions in a time of irony overload", she "spends most of Spirit straining for grand meaning-of-life statements."

Jon Pareles of The New York Times compared Jewel's vocal mannerisms on the album to those of Joni Mitchell, Stevie Nicks, Michael Stipe, and Rickie Lee Jones, adding that "half the songs ... reach an otherworldly tenderness, redeeming the lyrics through the grace of the music." Wendy Brandes of CNN praised Jewel's vocals on the album, though added: "In the funky, accusatory 'Who Will Save Your Soul' on the first album, Jewel dropped to a growl to ask, 'Who will save your soul after the lies that you told, boy.' Songs in the new collection such as 'Hands' and 'Kiss the Flame' are, by contrast, pleasant folky confections that don't distinguish themselves musically or lyrically."

== Track listing ==
All tracks are written by Jewel Kilcher, except where noted.

| No. | Title | Writer(s) | Length |
|---|---|---|---|
| 1. | "Deep Water" | | 4:16 |
| 2. | "What's Simple Is True" | | 3:34 |
| 3. | "Hands" | Kilcher; Patrick Leonard | 3:54 |
| 4. | "Kiss the Flame" | | 3:17 |
| 5. | "Down So Long" | | 4:13 |
| 6. | "Innocence Maintained" | | 4:08 |
| 7. | "Jupiter" | | 4:18 |
| 8. | "Fat Boy" | | 2:54 |
| 9. | "Enter from the East" | | 4:02 |
| 10. | "Barcelona" | | 3:53 |
| 11. | "Life Uncommon" | | 4:56 |
| 12. | "Do You" | | 4:21 |
| 13. | "Absence of Fear" (hidden track: "This Little Bird") | hidden track by John D. Loudermilk | 7:25 |

Non-U.S. bonus track
| No. | Title | Length |
|---|---|---|
| 14. | "Who Will Save Your Soul" (Live) | 3:29 |

Australian bonus disc – Live in Madrid 1999
| No. | Title | Length |
|---|---|---|
| 1. | "Down So Long" | 5:24 |
| 2. | "What's Simple Is True" | 3:54 |
| 3. | "Foolish Games" | 4:34 |
| 4. | "Do You" | 4:17 |
| 5. | "Who Will Save Your Soul" | 5:05 |

25th anniversary deluxe edition bonus tracks (disc 1)
| No. | Title | Writer(s) | Length |
|---|---|---|---|
| 14. | "This Little Bird" | Loudermilk |
| 15. | "Hands" (Single remix) | Kilcher; Leonard |
| 16. | "Down So Long" (Single Remix) |
| 17. | "Jupiter" (Single - Alternate Version) |
| 18. | "What's Simple Is True" (Soundtrack Version) |
| 19. | "You Were Meant For Me" (Live 2 Meter Sessions At VARA Studio, Netherlands – October 16, 1996) | Kilcher; Steve Poltz |
| 20. | "Who Will Save Your Soul" (Live 2 Meter Sessions At VARA Studio, Netherlands – October 16, 1996) |

25th anniversary deluxe edition bonus tracks (disc 2)
| No. | Title | Writer(s) | Length |
|---|---|---|---|
| 1. | "Down So Long" (Live At Colegio Oficial de Medicos de Madrid, Spain – February 11th 1999) |
| 2. | "What's Simple Is True" (Live At Colegio Oficial de Medicos de Madrid, Spain – February 11th 1999) |
| 3. | "Foolish Games" (Live At Colegio Oficial de Medicos de Madrid, Spain – February 11th 1999) |
| 4. | "Do You" (Live At Colegio Oficial de Medicos de Madrid, Spain – February 11th 1999) |
| 5. | "Who Will Save Your Soul" (Live At Colegio Oficial de Medicos de Madrid, Spain – February 11th 1999) |
| 6. | "Innocence Maintained" (Live At Wheeler Opera House, Aspen, CO – January 22, 1999) |
| 7. | "Fat Boy" (Live At Shepherd’s Bush Empire, London, UK – November 14, 1997) |
| 8. | "Deep Water" (Live At Fox FM Studios, Melbourne, Australia – February 25, 1999) |
| 9. | "Enter From The East" (Solo Acoustic Outtake) |
| 10. | "The Sue Lee Song" (Demo) |
| 11. | "Hands" (Studio Outtake) | Kilcher; Leonard |
| 12. | "Songs of Freedom" (Studio Outtake) |
| 13. | "Last Dance Rodeo" (Home Boombox Demo) |
| 14. | "Wandering" (Demo) |
| 15. | "Gloria" (Demo) |
| 16. | "Barcelona" (Live At Reunion Arena, Dallas, TX – July 9, 1999) |
| 17. | "Down" (Live At Woodstock ’99, Rome, NY, July 25, 1999) |
| 18. | "Beeswax Operetta" (Studio Outtake) |

== Personnel ==
Musicians
- Jewel – acoustic guitar, lead vocals, background vocals, harmony vocals
- Paul Bushnell – bass guitar
- Nedra Carroll – background vocals, lead vocals (13)
- David Channing – electric guitar
- Josh Clayton-Felt – electric guitar
- Vinnie Colaiuta – drums (1, 13)
- Jude Cole – dulcimer, acoustic guitar, dobro, mandolin, background vocals
- Luis Conte – percussion
- Flea – bass guitar (10)
- James Harrah – acoustic guitar, electric guitar
- Paul Jackson Jr. – 12 string guitar
- Patrick Leonard – piano, keyboard, electric piano
- Brian MacLeod – drums (2–7, 10–12), hand drums
- Doug Pettibone – electric guitar
- Marty Rifkin – pedal steel guitar
- Cameron Stone – cello

Technical personnel

- Peter Collins – production
- Patrick Leonard – production
- Ross Hogarth – engineering, mixing
- Christopher Shaw – engineering
- Robi Banerji – assistant engineering
- David Channing – assistant engineering
- Sebastian Haimerl – assistant engineering
- Bob Salcedo – assistant engineering
- John Sorenson – assistant engineering
- Katy Teasdale – assistant engineering
- Kevin Killen – mixing
- Bob Ludwig – mastering
- Patrick Leonard – programming
- Jeremy Lubbock – string arrangements
- Edd Kolakowski – piano technician

Art personnel

- Brenda Rotheiser – art direction, design
- Jeanne Greco – artwork
- Matthew Rolston – photography
- Danny Flynn – stylist
- Chris McMillan – hair stylist
- Troy Jensen – makeup

== Charts ==
=== Weekly charts ===
Weekly chart performance for Spirit
| Chart (1998–1999) | Peak position |
|---|---|
| Australian Albums (ARIA) | 5 |
| Austrian Albums (Ö3 Austria) | 48 |
| Canada Top Albums/CDs (RPM) | 2 |
| Canadian Albums (Billboard) | 6 |
| Dutch Albums (Album Top 100) | 16 |
| European Albums (Music & Media) | 79 |
| French Albums (SNEP) | 52 |
| German Albums (Offizielle Top 100) | 42 |
| Japanese Albums (Oricon) | 35 |
| New Zealand Albums (RMNZ) | 4 |
| Scottish Albums (Official Charts) | 85 |
| Swedish Albums (Sverigetopplistan) | 53 |
| Swiss Albums (Schweizer Hitparade) | 32 |
| UK Albums (Official Charts) | 54 |
| US Billboard 200 | 3 |

=== Year-end charts ===
Year-end chart performance for Spirit
| Chart (1999) | Position |
|---|---|
| Australian Albums (ARIA) | 21 |
| Canadian Top Albums/CDs (RPM) | 53 |
| Dutch Albums (Album Top 100) | 92 |
| New Zealand Albums (RMNZ) | 24 |
| US Billboard 200 | 13 |

== Certifications ==
Certifications for Spirit
| Region | Certification | Certified units/sales |
|---|---|---|
| Australia (ARIA) | 3× Platinum | 210,000^{^} |
| Japan (RIAJ) | Gold | 100,000^{^} |
| Netherlands (NVPI) | Gold | 50,000^{^} |
| New Zealand (RMNZ) | Platinum | 15,000^{^} |
| United Kingdom (BPI) | Silver | 60,000^{^} |
| United States (RIAA) | 4× Platinum | 4,000,000^{^} |
^{^} Shipments figures based on certification alone.
