= Patrick Leonard =

American musician and producer (born 1956)

- Born: Patrick Ray Leonard; March 14, 1956 (age 70); Crystal Falls, Michigan, U.S.
- Occupations: Songwriter; keyboardist; film composer; music producer
- Spouses: Olivia d'Abo (m. 2002; div. 2012) Anna Mjöll (m. 2018)
- Website: patrickleonardmusic.com

Patrick Ray Leonard (born March 14, 1956) is an American songwriter, keyboardist, film composer, and music producer, best known for his longtime collaboration with Madonna. His work with Madonna includes her albums True Blue (1986), Who's That Girl (1987), Like a Prayer (1989), I'm Breathless (1990), and Ray of Light (1998). He scored Madonna's 2008 documentary I Am Because We Are, played keyboards with her at Live Aid (1985), and was musical director and keyboardist on The Virgin Tour (1985) and the Who's That Girl World Tour (1987).

Leonard has also worked with a wide variety of other artists including late-period Pink Floyd and solo Roger Waters, Elton John, Leonard Cohen, Bryan Ferry, Julian Lennon, Rod Stewart, Michael Jackson, Fleetwood Mac, Jeff Beck, Bryan Adams, Peter Cetera, Jewel, Blue October, Duncan Sheik, Michael W. Smith, Marianne Faithfull, and Robbie Robertson. He was half of the groups Toy Matinee with Kevin Gilbert and Third Matinee with Richard Page. He has also acted as composer for a variety of films and stage productions.

Leonard collaborated with Leonard Cohen, acting as a writer and producer for 2012's Old Ideas and 2014's Popular Problems, and co-writer, co-producer of 2016's You Want It Darker. "Nevermind", a song from Popular Problems that Leonard co-wrote and produced, was featured as the title theme for Season 2 of HBO's True Detective. Cohen remarked that Leonard "is such a magnificent composer. I don't think there's anybody working today with those kinds of skills."

In 1997, Leonard released the instrumental album Rivers on his own record label, Unitone. In 2024, he released the double album It All Comes Down to Mood on his current label, Ruudy 6 Recordings.

== Early career ==
Leonard was born on March 14, 1956, in Crystal Falls, Michigan. He entered the music business with late 1970s Chicago-based pop rock band Whisper, then later the same band membership, Trillion (name changed for legal reasons), featuring future Toto singer Dennis "Fergie" Frederiksen on lead vocals. He also had a short stint as a keyboardist with the Allman Brothers Band in 1980.

He went on to act as musical director and lead keyboardist for the Jacksons' Victory Tour in 1984.

== Influences ==
"The Lamb Lies Down on Broadway, Dark Side of the Moon, The Wall – that's what I grew up with and that's what I dreamed of doing one day," he recalled in 1992. "I was a big Gentle Giant fan. I was a huge Jethro Tull fan. But I had to feed my children and heat my house, so I wrote some songs with a little girl who became extremely popular. It's really that simple."

== Personal life ==
Leonard and Icelandic singer and songwriter Anna Mjöll were married on November 19, 2018, in Patrick's home town, Crystal Falls, Michigan. He was previously married to British actress and singer Olivia d'Abo from 2002 to 2012.

Leonard has three children: a daughter (for whom Madonna's song "Dear Jessie" was written), and two sons.

== Work in film and stage ==
=== Selected film credits ===
- Leonard composed the score for At Close Range (1986). Directed by James Foley and starring Sean Penn and Christopher Walken. He also co-wrote and produced the song "Live to Tell" by Madonna, featured heavily in the film.
- Composed score for Nothing in Common (1986). Directed by Garry Marshall and starring Tom Hanks, Jackie Gleason, and Eva Marie Saint.
- Composed score for Heart Condition (1990)
- Composed score for Timebomb (1991)
- Composed score for With Honors (1994). Directed by Alex Keshishian and starring Brendan Fraser and Joe Pesci. Co-wrote and co-produced with Madonna the U.S. No. 2 theme song I'll Remember which was nominated for a Golden Globe and a Grammy.
- Composed score for the documentary I Am Because We Are (2008). Directed by Nathan Rissman and written and produced by Madonna.
- Composed score for Triumph of the Dream (2012). A documentary by photographer and filmmaker Norman Seeff that explores the inner creative process of the scientists at work on NASA's Mars rover Mission.
- Composed score for Lullaby (2014). Directed by Andrew Levitas and starring Garrett Hedlund, Richard Jenkins, and Amy Adams.

=== Selected stage credits ===
- Leonard wrote the music for The Ten Commandments: The Musical, an adaptation of the French musical Les Dix Commandements created by Élie Chouraqui, alongside lyricist Maribeth Derry. It debuted at the Kodak Theatre on September 21, 2004, and was directed by Robert Iscove with choreography by Travis Payne and costumes by Max Azria. The original cast featured Val Kilmer, Lauren Kennedy, and Adam Lambert.
- In 2010, Leonard worked with the Martha Graham Dance Company to recompose the music for a pivotal Graham piece featured in the company's 2010 restaging of American Document. The work premiered at the Joyce Theatre on June 8, 2010.

== Selected music credits ==
With Madonna (1985-1990, 1994, 1998, 2008)

- as musical director:
  - The Virgin Tour (1985)
  - Who's That Girl World Tour (1987)
- as Co-Writer and Co-Producer:
  - From album True Blue (1986): "Live to Tell", "La Isla Bonita", "Where's the Party", "White Heat", "Love Makes the World Go Round"
  - From album Who's That Girl (1987): "Who's That Girl", "The Look of Love"
  - From album Like a Prayer (1989): "Like a Prayer", "Cherish", "Till Death Do Us Part", "Promise to Try", "Pray for Spanish Eyes", "Act of Contrition", "Dear Jessie", "Oh Father", "Supernatural"
  - From album I'm Breathless (1990): "Hanky Panky", "Cry Baby", "He's a Man", "Back in Business", "Something to Remember"
  - From album With Honors (1994): "I'll Remember"
  - From album Ray of Light (1998): "Frozen", "Nothing Really Matters", "Has to Be", "Sky Fits Heaven", "Skin"
- as Co-Producer:
  - "Open Your Heart" (1986)
  - "I'm Going Bananas" (1990)
  - "Now I'm Following You" (1990)
  - "To Have and Not to Hold" (1998)
  - "The Power of Good-Bye" (1998)
- for Music Score:
  - I Am Because We Are (2008) - Leonard scored the music for the documentary written, narrated and produced by Madonna.

With other artists

- Bryan Ferry – co-produced the album Bête Noire (1987)
- Duncan Sheik – produced the album Daylight
- Nick Kamen – co-written the song "Tell Me" with Madonna (1988)
- Anna Vissi – Apagorevmeno, written and produced songs, including the title track
- Jody Watley – "Most of All"
- Julie Brown – "Boys 'R a Drug" (1987)
- Donna De Lory – co-wrote the song "Just a Dream" with Madonna (1992)
- Pink Floyd – song "Yet Another Movie" from A Momentary Lapse of Reason (1987), co-writer and musician
- Roger Waters – album Amused to Death (1992), co-producer and musician ("The most gratifying experience I've ever had," said Leonard. "I adore Roger. I think he's brilliant." Waters remarked: "I liked the cut of his jib. Whatever Pat had done before didn't interest me. He had sat in a Chicago theatre, aged fourteen, watching Pink Floyd play Dark Side of the Moon when it was still called Eclipse. He knew all my work and I was impressed.")
- Bon Jovi – co-produced the album This Left Feels Right
- Fleetwood Mac – "Love Shines", "Heart of Stone",
- Julian Lennon – produced album, keyboards Mr. Jordan, and co-wrote the song, "Make It Up to You" (1989)
- Pat Monahan – Last of Seven
- The Williams Brothers – "Some Become Strangers" (1987)
- Carly Simon – "If It Wasn't Love" (1986)
- Boz Scaggs – "Cool Running" (1988)
- Cheap Trick – "Everybody Knows" (2009)
- Sheena Easton - "No Sound But A Heart" (1987)
- Peter Cetera – "One Good Woman"
- Lara Fabian – wrote and produced three songs for her first English-language album, Lara Fabian: "Part Of Me", "Givin' Up On You" and "Yeliel (My Angel)"
- Natalie Imbruglia – "That Day"
- Jewel – produced Spirit and co-wrote the song, "Hands"
- David Darling – "96 Years"
- Casey Stratton – produced Standing at the Edge (2004)
- Ilse DeLange – produced The Great Escape (2006)
- Elton John – The Road to El Dorado (producer and co-writer of "Someday Out Of The Blue"), Songs From The West Coast (producer)
- Laura Pausini – From the inside–(producer)
- Ken Hensley (ex–Uriah Heep) – From Time to Time (1994), keyboards on "There Comes a Time"
- Leonard Cohen – Old Ideas (2012), co-writer and musician
- Leonard Cohen – Popular Problems (2014), co-writer and producer
- Leonard Cohen – You Want It Darker (2016), co-writer, co-producer and musician
- Iris Hond - Dear World (2016), producer
- Leonard Cohen – Thanks for the Dance (2019), co-writer and musician
- Marianne Faithfull – co-wrote "Mother Wolf" on Give My Love to London with Faithfull
- Robbie Robertson – co-wrote "Skinwalker" on Music for the Native Americans with Robertson

== Collaborations ==
- I've Got the Cure - Stephanie Mills (1984)
- True Blue - Madonna (1986)
- Abstract Emotions - Randy Crawford (1986)
- Bête Noire - Bryan Ferry (1987)
- Back to Avalon - Kenny Loggins (1988)
- One More Story - Peter Cetera (1988)
- Other Roads - Boz Scaggs (1988)
- Mr. Jordan - Julian Lennon (1989)
- Like a Prayer - Madonna (1989)
- Vagabond Heart - Rod Stewart (1991)
- Amused to Death - Roger Waters (1992)
- I'll Lead You Home - Michael W. Smith (1995)
- Spirit - Jewel (1998)
- Lara Fabian - Lara Fabian (1999)
- Ronan - Ronan Keating (2000)
- Songs from the West Coast - Elton John (2001)
- Anastacia - Anastacia (2004)
- The Great Escape - Ilse DeLange (2006)
- Mind How You Go - Skye Edwards (2006)
- Taking Chances - Céline Dion (2007)
- Last Days at the Lodge - Amos Lee (2008)
- Απαγορευμένο - Άννα Βίσση (2009)
- Like a Man - Adam Cohen (2011)
- Old Ideas - Leonard Cohen (2012)
- Popular Problems - Leonard Cohen (2014)
- We Go Home - Adam Cohen (2014)
- You Want It Darker - Leonard Cohen (2016)
- Thanks for the Dance - Leonard Cohen (2019)
