= Jewel (singer) =

American musician (born 1974)

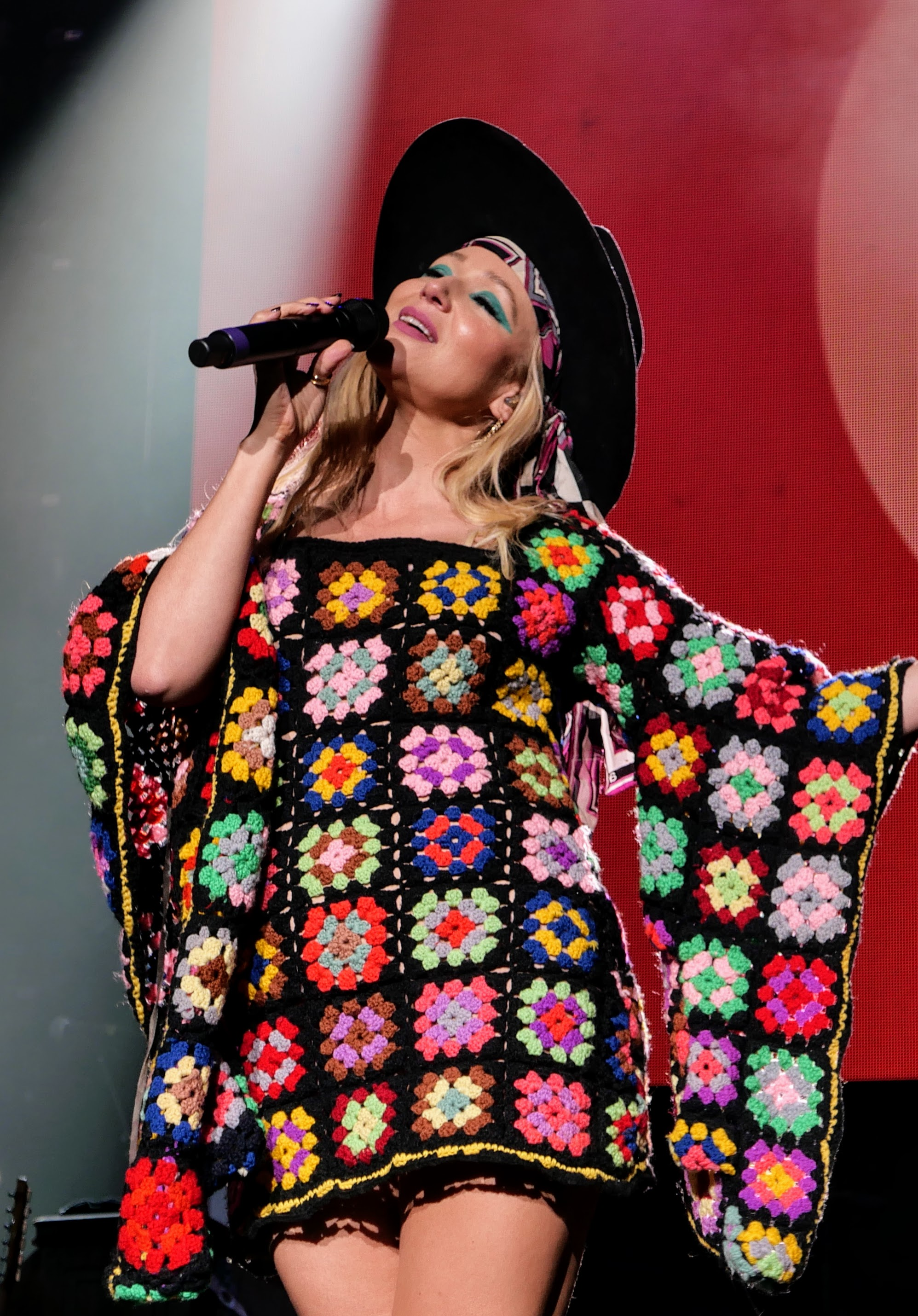
- Jewel performing in 2022
- Born: Jewel Kilcher; May 23, 1974 (age 52); Payson, Utah, U.S.
- Occupations: Singer; songwriter; poet; author; activist; actress
- Years active: 1994–present
- Spouse: Ty Murray (m. 2008; div. 2014)
- Children: 1
- Father: Atz Kilcher
- Relatives: Yule F. Kilcher (grandfather); Mossy Kilcher (aunt); Q'orianka Kilcher (first cousin once removed)
- Musical career
- Origin: Homer, Alaska, U.S.
- Genres: Pop; country; folk
- Instruments: Vocals (soprano); guitar
- Labels: Atlantic; Valory
- Website: jeweljk.com

Jewel Kilcher (born May 23, 1974) is an American singer-songwriter. She has been nominated for four Grammy Awards and has sold over 30 million albums worldwide as of 2024.

Jewel was raised near Homer, Alaska, where she grew up singing and yodeling as a musical duo with her father, Atz Kilcher, a local musician. At age fifteen, she received a partial scholarship to the Interlochen Arts Academy in Michigan, where she studied operatic voice. After graduating, she began writing and performing at clubs and coffeehouses in San Diego, California. Based on local media attention, she was signed by Atlantic Records in 1993, which released her debut album Pieces of You two years later. One of the best-selling debut albums of all time, it went 12-times platinum. The debut single from the album, "Who Will Save Your Soul", peaked at number 11 on the Billboard Hot 100. Singles "You Were Meant for Me" and "Foolish Games" reached number two on the Hot 100, and were listed on Billboard's 1997 year-end singles chart, as well as Billboard's 1998 year-end singles chart.

Jewel's second effort, Spirit, was released in 1998, followed by This Way (2001). In 2003, she released 0304, which marked a departure from her previous folk-oriented records, featuring electronic arrangements and elements of dance-pop. In 2008, she released Perfectly Clear, her first country album, which debuted atop Billboard's Top Country Albums chart and featured three singles, "Stronger Woman", "I Do", and "'Til It Feels Like Cheating". In 2009, Jewel released her first independent album, Lullaby.

In 1998, Jewel released a collection of poetry, and in the following year, she appeared in a supporting role in Ang Lee's Western film Ride with the Devil (1999) which earned her critical acclaim. In 2021, she won the sixth season of The Masked Singer as the Queen of Hearts.

== Early life ==
Jewel Kilcher was born in Payson, Utah, the second child of Atz Kilcher and Lenedra Kilcher (née Carroll). At the time of her birth, her parents had been living in Utah with her elder brother, Shane; her father was attending Brigham Young University. She is a cousin of actress Q'orianka Kilcher. Her father, originally from Alaska, was a member of the Church of Jesus Christ of Latter-day Saints, though the family stopped attending church after her parents' divorce when she was eight years old. Her paternal grandfather, Yule Kilcher, was a delegate to the Alaska constitutional convention and a state senator who settled in Alaska after emigrating from Switzerland. He was also the first recorded person to cross the Harding Icefield.

Shortly after Jewel's birth, her family relocated to Anchorage, Alaska, settling on the Kilcher family's 770-acre (310 ha) homestead. There, her younger brother Atz Jr. was born. She also has a half-brother, Nikos, who was primarily raised in Oregon by his mother, with whom her father had a brief relationship; Jewel would later become close to him in adulthood. After her parents' divorce in 1981, Jewel lived with her father near Homer, Alaska. The house she grew up in lacked indoor plumbing and had only a simple outhouse. The Kilcher family is featured on the Discovery Channel show Alaska: The Last Frontier, which chronicles their day-to-day struggles living in the Alaskan wilderness. Recalling her upbringing, she said:

"We lived far from town. We had to walk 2 miles (3.2 km) just to get to the saddle barn I was raised in... No running water, no heat—we had a coal stove and an outhouse and we mainly lived off of what we could kill or can. We picked berries and made jam. We caught fish to freeze and had gardens and cattle to live on. I rode horses every day in the summer beneath the Alaskan midnight sun. I loved it there."

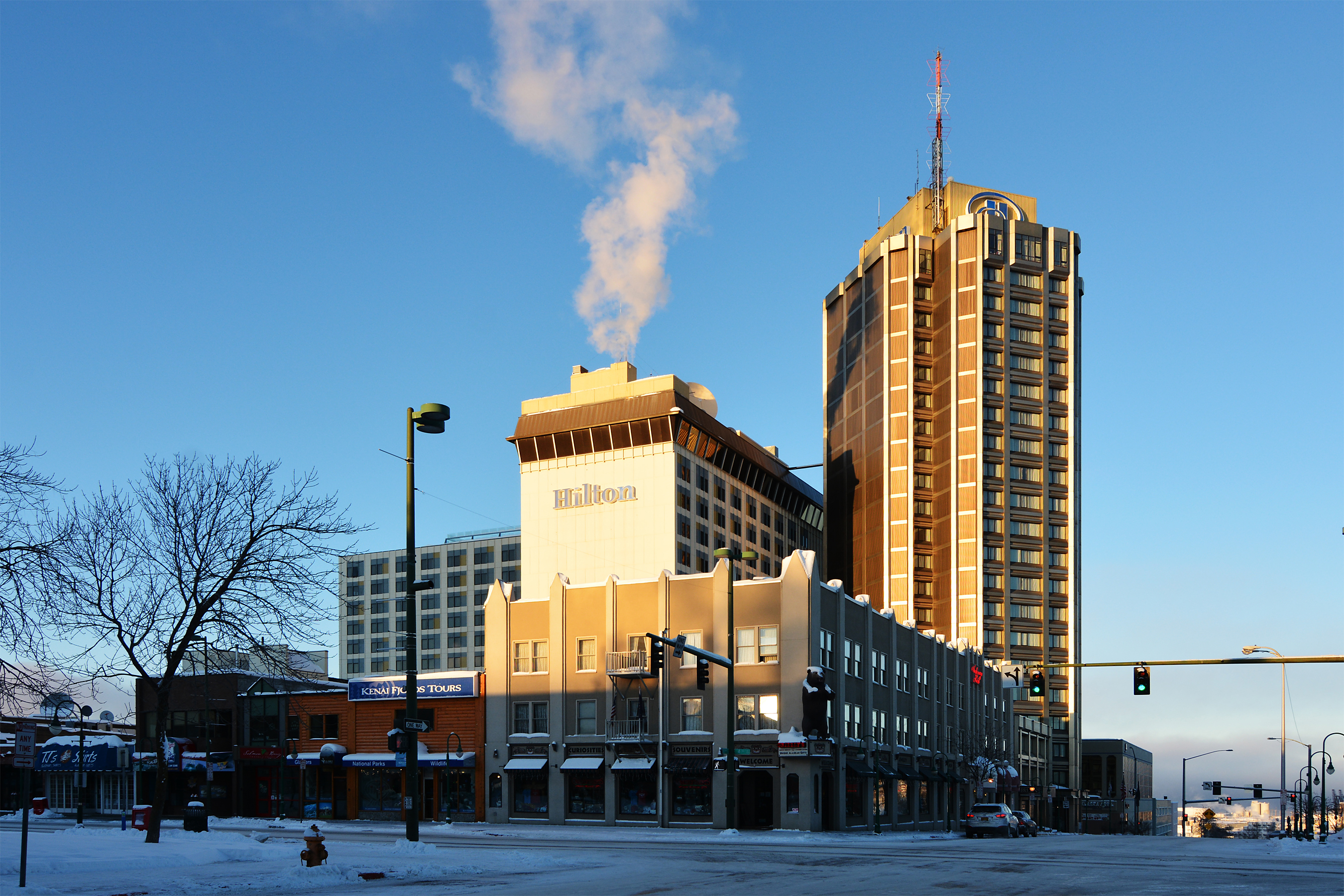
The Hilton Anchorage, where Jewel sometimes performed with her father as a child

According to Jewel, the first song she learned to sing was "Saint Louis Blues". In her youth, Jewel and her father sometimes earned a living by performing music in roadhouses and taverns as a father-daughter musical duo; they also often sang at hotels in Anchorage, including the Hotel Captain Cook and the Hilton Anchorage. It was during this time that Jewel learned to yodel from her father. She would later credit the time she spent in bars as integral to her formative years: "I saw women who would compromise themselves for compliments, for flattery; or men who would run away from themselves by drinking until they ultimately killed themselves."

At age fifteen, while working at a dance studio in Anchorage, she was referred by the studio instructor to Interlochen Arts Academy in Interlochen, Michigan, where she applied and received a partial scholarship to study operatic voice. Local businesses in her hometown of Homer donated items for auction to help allocate additional funds, and raised a total of $11,000 to pay the remainder of her first year's tuition. She subsequently relocated to Michigan to attend Interlochen, where she received classical training, and also learned to play guitar. She began writing songs on guitar at age sixteen. While in school, she would often perform live in coffeehouses. After graduating, she relocated to San Diego, California, where she worked in a coffee shop and as a phone operator at a computer warehouse.

== Music career ==
=== 1993–1997: Beginnings and Pieces of You ===
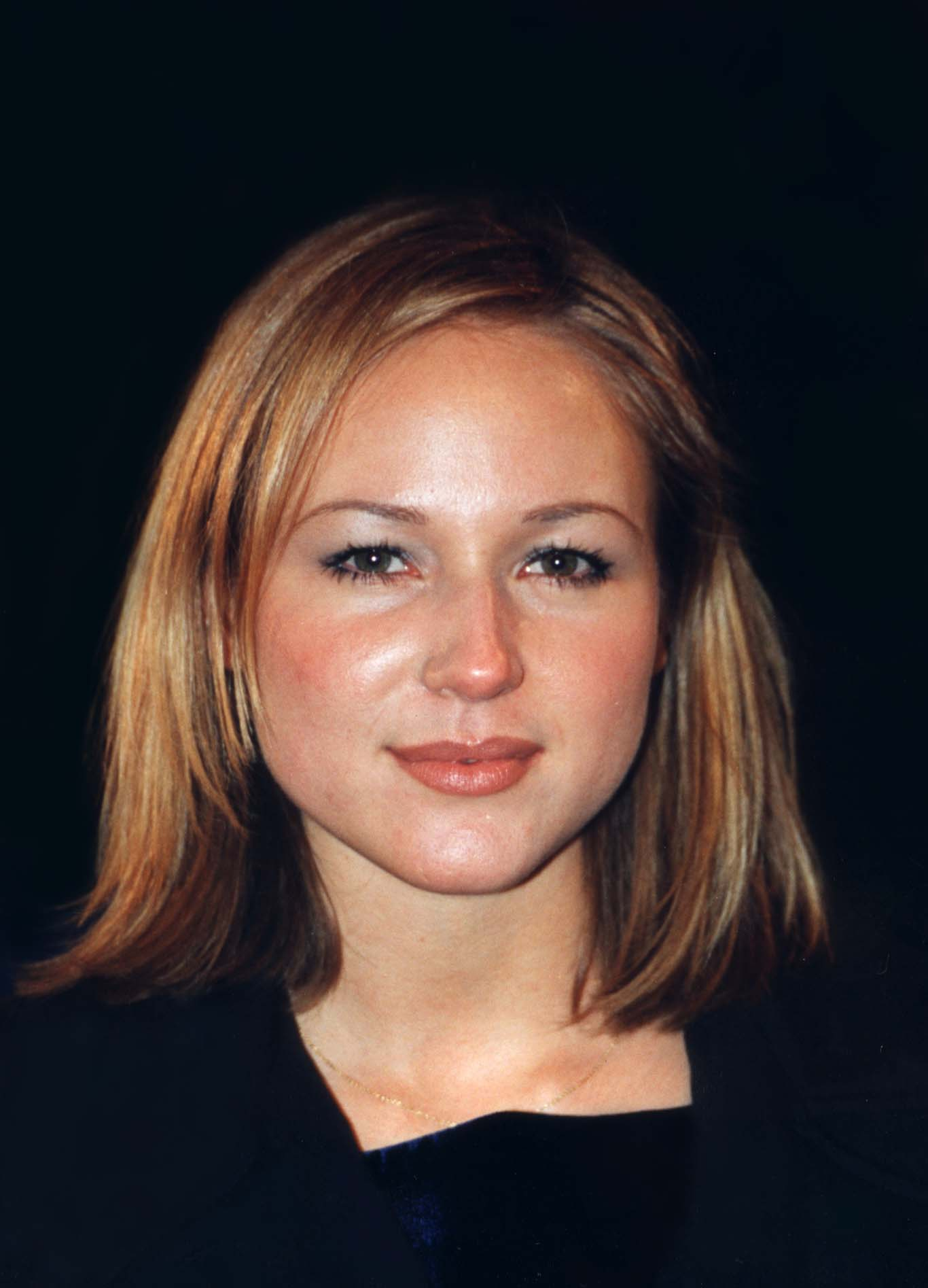
Jewel at Bill Clinton's second inauguration gala, 1997

For a time, Jewel lived in her car while traveling around the country doing street performances and small gigs, mainly in Southern California. She gained recognition by singing at the Inner Change Cafe and Java Joe's in San Diego. Her friend Steve Poltz's band, the Rugburns, played the same venues. She later collaborated with Poltz on some of her songs, including "You Were Meant for Me". (He also appeared in the song's second, better-known video.) The Rugburns opened for Jewel on her Tiny Lights tour in 1997. Poltz appeared in Jewel's band on the Spirit World Tour 1999 playing guitar.

Jewel was discovered by Inga Vainshtein in 1993 when John Hogan, lead singer from the local San Diego band Rust, whom Vainshtein was managing, called to tell her about a girl surfer who sang at a local coffee shop on Thursdays. Vainshtein drove to The Inner Change with an Atlantic Records representative, and after the show called Danny Goldberg, the head of Atlantic's West Coast operations, and asked him to pay for her demo, since at the time she was living in a van and lacked the means to record any of her own music. Vainshtein, who was a Vice President of Productions at Paramount Pictures at the time, became her manager and was instrumental in creating a major bidding war that led to her deal with Atlantic. She continued to manage Jewel for the next five years. Jewel's performances at the Inner Change led to the first of several industry award nominations for the singer. At the third annual San Diego Music Awards in 1994, she won the award for Best Acoustic.

Jewel's debut album, Pieces of You, was released in 1995 when she was 21 years old. Recorded in a studio on singer Neil Young's ranch, it included Young's backing band, the Stray Gators, who played on his Harvest and Harvest Moon albums. Part of the album was recorded live at the Inner Change Cafe in San Diego, where Jewel had risen to local fame. The album stayed on the Billboard 200 for two years, reaching number four at its peak. The album spawned the Top 10 hits "You Were Meant for Me", "Who Will Save Your Soul", and "Foolish Games". To promote the album, she toured as the opening act for Bauhaus frontman Peter Murphy on his 1995 North American tour in support of his album Cascade. Pieces of You eventually sold over 12 million copies in the United States alone.

In the late 1990s, Mike Connell created an electronic mailing list for fans, known as "Everyday Angels". Although Jewel does not subscribe to this mailing list, she maintained communication with her EDA fans. On July 18 and 19, 1996, she gave a two-day concert known as "JewelStock" at the Bearsville Theatre. Jewel allowed the concert to be taped, and fans circulated the concert without profit.

=== 1998–2002: Spirit and other ventures ===
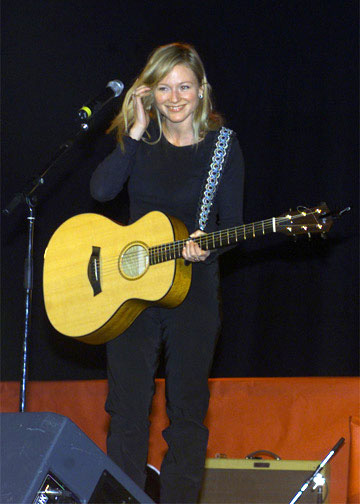
Jewel performing for U.S. troops at the Ramstein Air Base, Germany, 2000

Jewel was chosen to sing the American national anthem at the opening of Super Bowl XXXII in January 1998 in San Diego. She was introduced as "San Diego's own Jewel!" but criticized for lip syncing the anthem to a digitally-recorded track of her own voice. This was especially noticeable due to her missing her cue and not mouthing the first words. Super Bowl producers have since admitted that they attempt to have all performers pre-record their vocals. She performed "The Star-Spangled Banner" again in the 2003 NBA Finals in one of the New Jersey Nets' home games.

Jewel's second studio album, which she titled Spirit, was released on November 17, 1998. The album debuted at number 3 on the Billboard 200 with 368,000 copies sold in its first week. It eventually sold 3.7 million units in the United States. Its lead single, "Hands", peaked at number six on the Billboard Hot 100 chart. Other singles followed, including a new version of "Jupiter (Swallow the Moon)", "What's Simple Is True", which she meant to be the theme song to her upcoming movie, and the charity single "Life Uncommon". Shortly after the release of Spirit, Jewel made her acting debut playing the character Sue Lee Shelley in Ang Lee's Western film Ride with the Devil (1999), opposite Tobey Maguire. The film received mixed-positive reviews, though critic Roger Ebert praised her performance, writing: "Jewel deserves praise for, quite simply, performing her character in a convincing and unmannered way. She is an actress here, not a pop star trying out a new hobby."

In November 1999, Jewel released Joy: A Holiday Collection. The album sold over a million copies and peaked at No. 32 on the Billboard 200. She released a cover of "Joy to the World" from the album as a single. In 2000, she completed an autobiography titled Chasing Down the Dawn, a collection of diary entries and musings detailing her life growing up in Alaska, her struggle to learn her craft, and life on the road. In November 2001, her fourth studio album, This Way, was released. The album peaked at No. 9 on the Billboard 200 and sold over 1.5 million copies in the U.S. A song from the album "Standing Still" hit the Top 30. Other singles released were "Break Me", "This Way", and "Serve the Ego"; this last gave Jewel her first number one club hit. Shortly after this album's release, Jewel collaborated with country singer Garth Brooks on a cover of Ian Tyson's "Someday Soon" aboard the USS Enterprise in Norfolk, Virginia, as part of his live Coast to Coast concerts.

=== 2003–2006: 0304 and Goodbye Alice in Wonderland ===
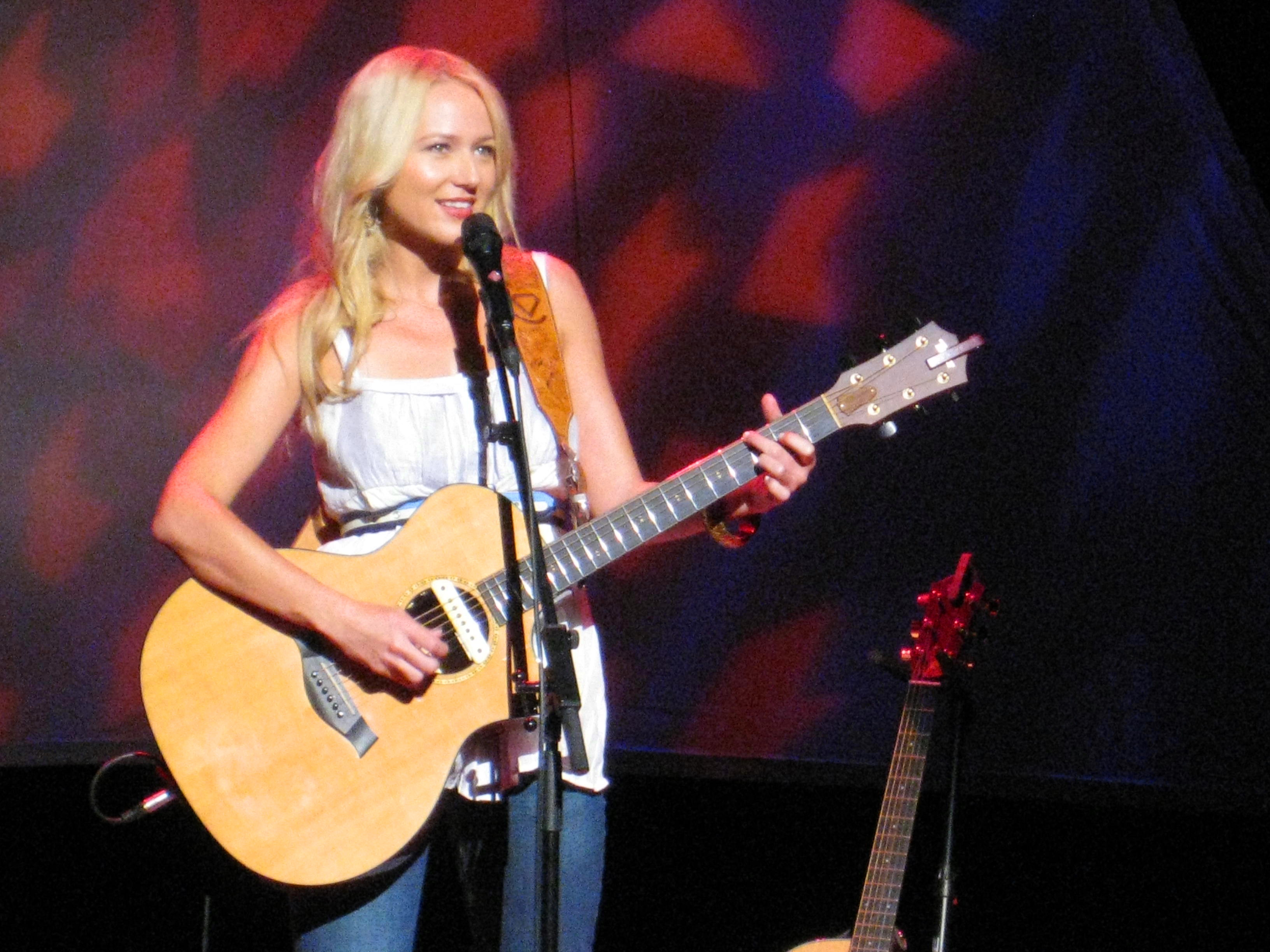
Jewel performing at The Hard Rock Casino's The Molson Theatre in B.C., in 2008

In June 2003, Jewel released her fifth studio album, titled 0304. The album was promoted by its lead single, "Intuition", which reached No. 5 on the Billboard Adult Pop Songs chart and No. 20 on the Billboard Hot 100. Within two months of its release, the album had sold over 350,000 in the United States. The shift in musical style on 0304 was noted by several critics, with People deeming it "an extreme musical makeover." In response, Jewel commented that she had been inspired to make a more upbeat-sounding record in light of the Iraq War: "I knew we were headed to war [at the time]... The music that has always done well during wartime has always been music that makes you want to escape." In his review of the album, Alexis Petridis of The Guardian wrote "It's the most dramatic image overhaul you're ever likely to see". Both "Intuition" and its follow-up single "Stand" were number one hits on the Dance Club Songs chart.

On May 2, 2006, Jewel released her sixth studio album, Goodbye Alice in Wonderland. The album debuted at No. 8 on the Billboard Albums Chart and sold 82,000 copies in its first week. The lead single "Again and Again" peaked at No. 16 on Adult Top 40 Radio. The second single "Good Day" was released to radio in late June and peaked at No. 30 on the Adult Pop Songs charts. In the album's liner notes, Jewel described Goodbye Alice in Wonderland as "the story of my life" and "the most autobiographical album I have made since Pieces of You." To promote the album, a music video for "Stephenville, TX", Jewel's next single, was shown on Yahoo! Launch. After a photo shoot at her Texas ranch, Jewel spontaneously decided to have photographer Kurt Markus shoot the music video for the song "Goodbye Alice in Wonderland".

Following this album's release, Jewel contributed the original composition "Quest for Love" for the North American version of the 2006 Luc Besson film Arthur and the Invisibles.

=== 2007–2008: Label shift and Perfectly Clear ===
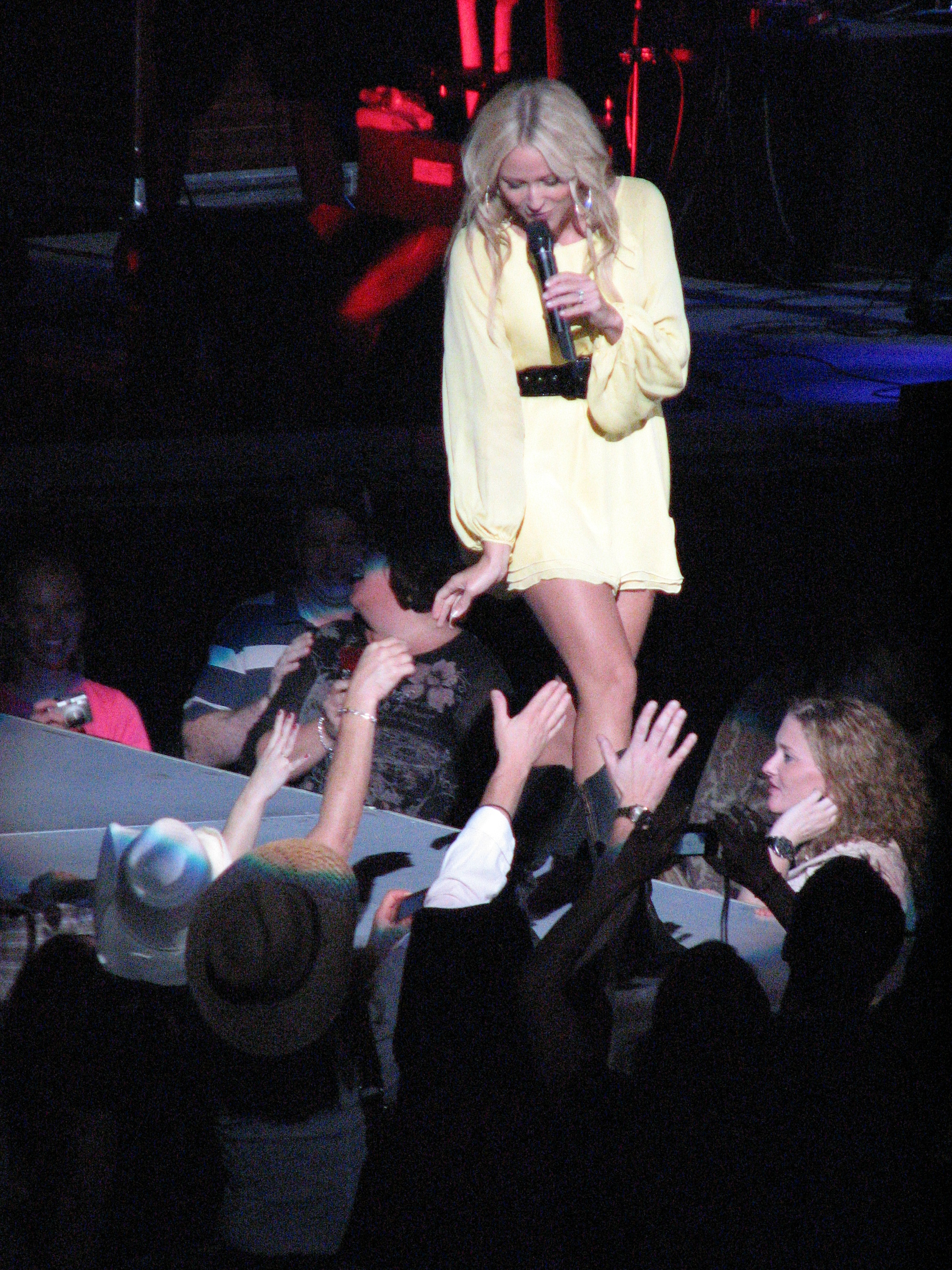
Jewel performing live in Providence, Rhode Island, 2008

In early February 2007 Jewel recorded a duet with Jason Michael Carroll, "No Good in Goodbye", that was featured on Carroll's debut CD, Waitin' in the Country. She also made a promotional appearance on the T in Boston for the Verizon Yellow Pages, playing songs on a moving subway car and then doing an hour-long acoustic concert in South Station.

In a 2007 interview with The Boston Globe, Jewel stated that she was no longer affiliated with a record label, confirming rumors that Atlantic Records had failed to renew her contract after the lackluster sales of her then-latest album. She also hinted that she would like to do a country album next. She worked with John Rich of Big & Rich fame, who said that she was "probably one of the greatest American singer-songwriters we have had." He also said that "every label in Nashville" was talking to her at the time.

In November 2007, Jewel was signed to Valory Records, a newly formed division of the independent Big Machine Records label. Her first country album, Perfectly Clear, was released on June 3, 2008, selling 48,000 units in its first week. It debuted at No. 1 on the Billboard Country Album Chart and No. 8 on the Billboard 200 Album Chart. In its second week on the charts, the album dropped to No. 25 on the Billboard 200 and No. 5 on the Country Albums chart, with estimated second week sales of 75,000 units. Jewel made her second film appearance in a cameo, appearing as herself in the comedy film Walk Hard, released in December 2007.

Approximately a month later, "Stronger Woman", the lead single from Perfectly Clear, was released to country radio on January 17, 2008, and entered the Top 20 on the Billboard Hot Country Songs charts. On April 26, 2008, it peaked at No. 13. The next single, "I Do", was released to radio on June 23, 2008. The video for the single featured her cowboy then-husband, Ty Murray. This song peaked at No. 28. Following it was "'Til It Feels Like Cheating", which peaked at No. 57. Perfectly Clear was released in Australia in late May 2009. It was then released across Europe by Humphead Records in June 2009.

=== 2009–2013: Lullaby and other releases ===
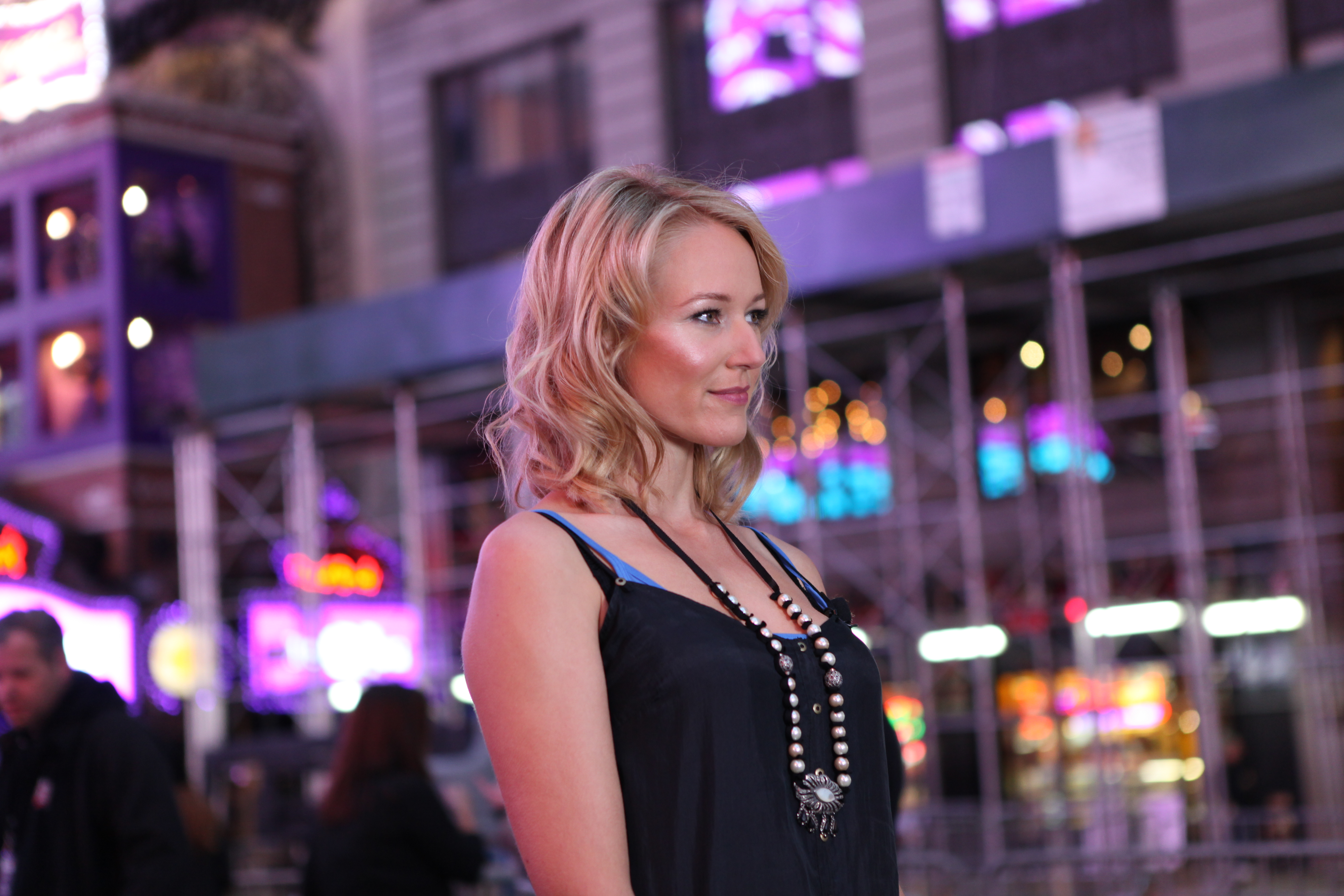
Jewel at the Yahoo! Yodel event in New York City, 2009

In early 2009, it was announced that Jewel would release a new studio album titled Lullaby, a collection of lullabies which she described as "not just for children, but also adults". Its lead single, "Somewhere Over the Rainbow", was released on iTunes on March 17, 2009. The album was released on May 5, 2009. "Somewhere Over The Rainbow" was No.1 on The Top Children's Songs the week of release. Like 2011's The Merry Goes 'Round, it is sold under the Fisher Price brand which Jewel described as "a great partnership".

Jewel also recorded the "Make It Last" with R&B singer Tyrese in conjunction with the release of his comic book Mayhem!. It was intended to be used for the soundtrack to Transformers: Revenge of the Fallen but did not appear on the final track listing.

In January 2010, Jewel released "Stay Here Forever", from the soundtrack to the film Valentine's Day. It also served as the lead-off single to Jewel's ninth studio album Sweet and Wild released on June 8, 2010. The single debuted at No. 48 on the Hot Country Songs chart and reached No. 34 in May 2010. "Satisfied" was released as the album's second single on May 17, 2010, reaching its highest peak of No. 57. On October 10, 2010, Jewel released the third single from Sweet and Wild, "Ten". It made its debut on the Hot Country Songs Chart at No. 55 on the week of October 15, 2010, and peaked at No. 51 two weeks later.

Jewel's second children's album, The Merry Goes 'Round, was released in August 2011. Like 2009's Lullaby, it is sold under the Fisher-Price brand. In June 2012, Jewel was cast in the lead role as June Carter Cash in the Lifetime original movie Ring of Fire, opposite Matt Ross. Brian Lowry of Variety commended Jewel's live singing in the film, and noted: "Jewel and Ross are convincing as the central couple, playing them over an extended span." On October 16, 2012, Jewel announced via Twitter a Greatest Hits album would be released in 2013. The album features new duets from Kelly Clarkson and the Pistol Annies. Jewel and Clarkson recorded a fresh rendition of Jewel's song "Foolish Games" while Jewel and the Pistol Annies recut "You Were Meant for Me". The Greatest Hits album was released February 5, 2013.

On August 6, 2013, Jewel announced the release of her second Christmas album, titled Let It Snow: A Holiday Collection, scheduled for release on November 12, 2013. In an interview with The Wall Street Journal, Jewel was quoted as saying "I wanted this record to have a resemblance to the first album. It's a continuation of mood and spirit of that record, with the mood and feel of the album artwork with an image and tone that evokes that spirit."

=== 2014–2018: Picking Up the Pieces ===
In February 2014, Jewel began work on her next album and confirmed that it will not be released by a major record label, and that she was producing it herself. In April 2015, she appeared as a guest musician on Blues Traveler's album Blow Up the Moon, co-writing the song "Hearts Still Awake". On June 28, she revealed in a Q&A on Facebook that her upcoming album would be released in the second week of September of that year, and would feature a folk sound recorded with a live band. On July 21, Jewel confirmed the title as Picking Up the Pieces. Picking Up the Pieces was released on September 11, 2015. Four days later, on September 15, she released her third book, a new memoir entitled Never Broken: Songs Are Only Half the Story.

In 2016, Jewel was featured in the Comedy Central Roast of Rob Lowe, having previously met the actor when she was supposed to co-star with him in The Lyon's Den. During the Roast, Jewel performed a parody of "You Were Meant for Me" claiming she was the 16-year-old caught having sex with Lowe in a 1988 videotape. Also in 2016, Jewel founded Jewel Inc., a company established to support and manage work connected to her music and media projects and her entrepreneurial activities related to wellbeing and workplace culture. Among its ventures was co-creating in partnership with Trevor Drinkwater the Wellness Your Way, Music and Wellness Festival, held originally in 2018 in Cincinnati, Ohio. In 2017, she returned to acting, starring in the Fixer Upper Mysteries on the Hallmark Channel.

=== 2019–present: The Masked Singer and Freewheelin' Woman ===
Towards the end of 2019, Jewel released a new song "No More Tears", which was written and recorded for Lost in America, a documentary about youth homelessness in America by Rotimi Rainwater. In an interview with American Songwriter, Jewel explained that, in addition to being an executive producer on the documentary, she was inspired to write the track because she was moved by the stories of the individuals featured in the film and related those to her own experiences of being homeless when she was eighteen. In the same interview, it was confirmed that "No More Tears" would also be the first track released from her upcoming album which she hoped to release sometime in 2020.

In 2021, Jewel competed in season six of The Masked Singer as "Queen of Hearts". Jewel made her way to the finals, where she was declared the winner of season six on December 16, 2021. She was rewarded the golden mask trophy after her encore performance. After her performance of "River", judge Jenny McCarthy called her the greatest artist that they've ever had on the show. Jewel and her son performed a duet of her song "Hands" on The Masked Singer Christmas Singalong, aired on Fox on December 22, 2021. Jewel subsequently released a cover EP titled Queen of Hearts containing covers of the songs she performed on The Masked Singer.

In March 2022, it was announced that Jewel would represent Alaska in the inaugural American Song Contest, set to begin later in the month. She performed "The Story" in the third episode and scored well in the public vote, but her overall score was brought down by a lower jury ranking which narrowly cost Jewel a place in the semi-finals.

Jewel's thirteenth studio album, Freewheelin' Woman, was released on April 15, 2022, via her own label, Words Matter Media. The album was co-produced by Jewel and Butch Walker and was developed with the intention for Jewel to create music that she felt connected to and excited about rather than creating in order to meet expectations.

On February 19, 2023, Jewel performed "The Star-Spangled Banner" at the NBA All-Star Game in Salt Lake City, Utah.

On May 28, 2023, Jewel performed "The Star-Spangled Banner" at the Indy 500 in Speedway, Indiana.

On April 9, 2024, Jewel joined Olivia Rodrigo to perform "You Were Meant for Me" at her fourth show at Madison Square Garden for her Guts World Tour.

== Artistry ==
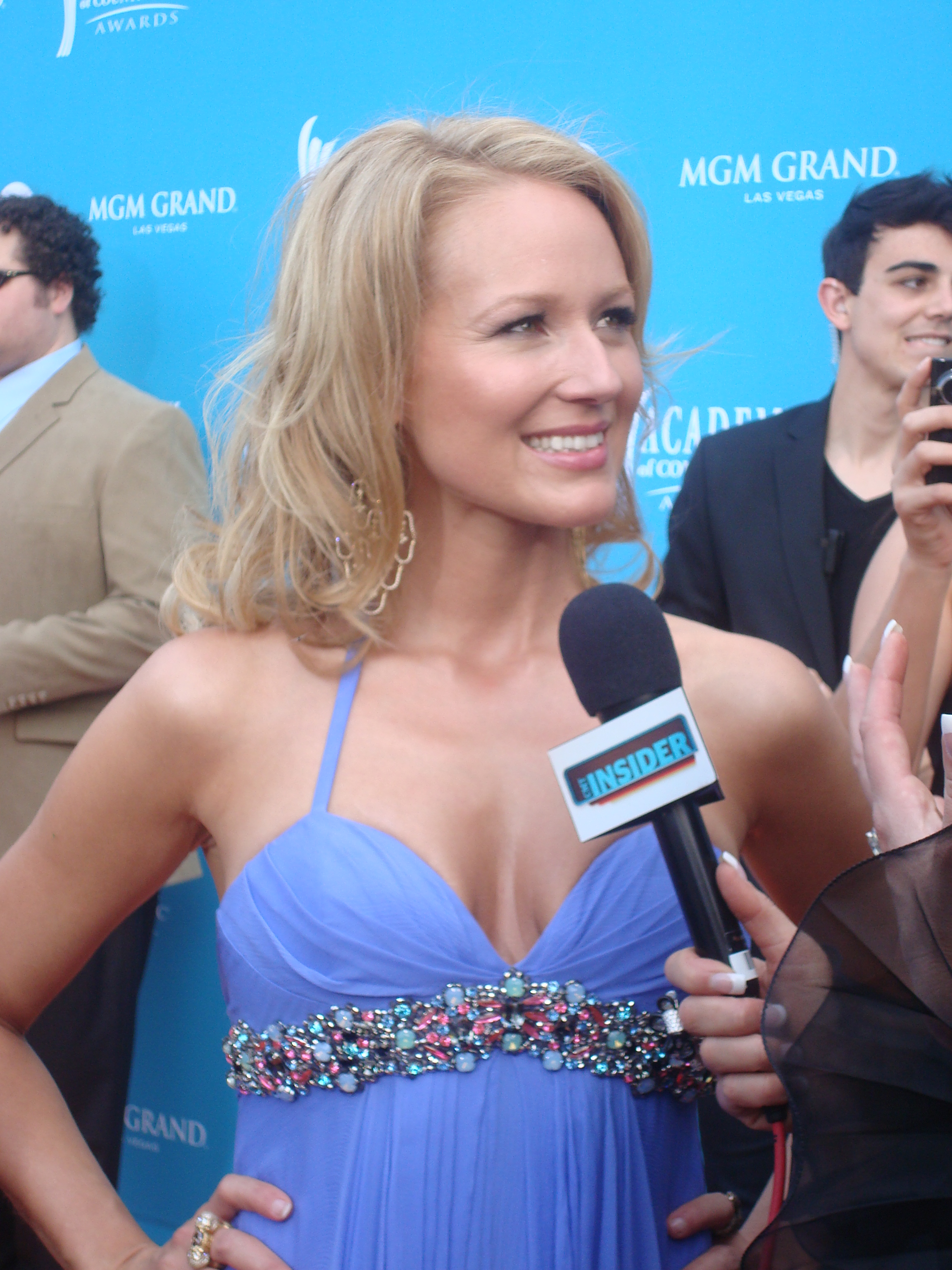
Jewel on the red carpet in 2010

Jewel is a soprano. Caitlin Gibson of The Washington Post described Jewel's vocal versatility, stating that "she can summon many voices—deep and powerful, girlish and sweet, piercing and agile." Gibson also commented about Jewel's debut; "In an era still gripped by grunge, [she] climbed to the top of the pop charts with sweet, simple folk tunes". Her fifth studio album 0304 was a departure from her previous folk rock-oriented albums and incorporates a more general pop sound. Stephen Thomas Erlewine of AllMusic wrote about 0304, describing it as "A record that (is) lyric-driven, like Cole Porter stuff, that also has a lot of swing... that combined dance, urban, and folk music. [...] [it is] an original-sounding album, something with more imagination than the average dance-pop record. Better still, it sounds more authentic (and boasts a better set of songs) than her previous records, which were either too ramshackle or too self-serious and doggedly somber to really reveal much character." Perfectly Clear (2008) was influenced by her appreciation for country music, while Picking Up The Pieces (2015) saw Jewel "going back to [her] folk/American roots that [she] began with."

Owning a wide variety of Taylor Guitars, Jewel uses a Taylor 912-C most often. Acoustic Guitar writer Jeffery Pepper Rodgers called the guitar her "steady companion". All of her guitars are strung with D'Addario products. To strum, she employs a unique self-created fingerpicking technique or a hard pick.

== Other work ==
=== Literary works ===
In 1998, Jewel published a book of poetry titled A Night Without Armor. Although it sold over 1 million copies and was a New York Times best-seller, it received mixed reviews. During an MTV interview in 1998, Kurt Loder pointed out the incorrect usage, in her book of poetry, of the word "casualty" (instead of the intended "casualness") to which Jewel responded, "You're a smartass for pointing that out. Next topic." In the fall of 1998, the poet Beau Sia composed a book-length response to A Night Without Armor that he titled A Night Without Armor II: The Revenge. The reviewer Edna Gundersen, writing in USA Today, noted, "Hers is flowery and sensitive. His is wry and absurd."

In 2000, Jewel published a biographical book called Chasing Down the Dawn. In 2012, Jewel published the children's book That's What I'd Do, illustrated by Amy June Bates. In 2013, Jewel published the children's book Sweet Dreams. In 2015, Jewel published her memoirs under the title Never Broken: Songs Are Only Half the Story.

=== Art World Projects ===
In 2024, Jewel created a museum-wide show at the Crystal Bridges Museum in Bentonville, Arkansas called The Portal: An Art Experience by Jewel. The show featured her own paintings, a special music and technology installation, and art works from the museum's collection including, Mickalene Thomas, Ruth Asawa, Julie Mehretu, and Alma Thomas. The show is organized around Jewel's idea of "Three Spheres," or realms, of human existence: the inner world, the outer world, and the unseen world.

Utilizing new technology alongside the traditional painting techniques in The Portal, Jewel choreographed a drone light show in partnership with Nova Sky Stories, which accompanies a new song. Jewel also partnered with the company Proto to present a hologram of her self welcoming visitors and performing songs.

=== Humanitarian activism ===
Jewel, alongside her mother, Lenedra J. Carroll, and her older brother, Shane, founded the nonprofit organization Higher Ground for Humanity. The organization focuses on education, sustainable improvements, and building alliances with like-minded organizations. Jewel donates a portion of her income to the organization and often holds events to benefit the organization. The organization tends to parallel Jewel's career since she provides the majority of the organization's funding. As of 2005, the activities of the organization were concluded. One early grantee was the Global Youth Action Network, which has become one of the largest youth movements around the United Nations.

In September 2006, as part of Lifetime's "Stop Breast Cancer for Life" campaign, Jewel delivered more than 12 million petition signatures to Capitol Hill, urging Congress to pass the bipartisan Breast Cancer Patient Protection Act of 2005 (S 910/HR1849). The bill would ban the practice of "drive-through" mastectomies, when women are discharged from the hospital just hours after their surgeries. Jewel served as the honorary chairperson of the 2006 Help the Homeless Walk in Washington, D.C.

In November 2008, Jewel began work on a project with several dozen singer-songwriters to write and auction their lyrics with donations benefiting her "Project Clean Water" charity. Many singers and songwriters besides herself have donated their written lyrics including Patrick Davis, Alabama's Randy Owen, John Mellencamp, Jason Mraz, Gretchen Wilson, and Marv Green. The majority of the lyrics were written on paper and signed by the songwriter, with the exception of Katy Perry's "I Kissed a Girl". Many of the artists in addition to writing and signing lyrics, drew pictures to illustrate their lyrics. The auction ran from December 1, 2008, to December 18, 2008, promoted by CMT and Virgin Music. Some of the lyrics that were up for auction included hits such as "So Small", "Foolish Games", "I'm Yours", "I Kissed a Girl", "St. Elmo's Fire (Man in Motion)", "Live Like You Were Dying", "I Don't Need a Man", "Superman (It's Not Easy)" and "Redneck Woman". The highest bought lyrics being Jewel's signature song "You Were Meant For Me" sold for US$1,505, and "Who Will Save Your Soul" and "Hands", raising more than $1,005 each. Jewel promised that all items sold by December 18 would be delivered by Christmas. After the majority of the auctions ended on December 18 two new lyrics by Craig Wiseman and Ernie Ashworth were put up for auction ending in January 2009.

In May 2013, Jewel served as ambassador for the ReThink: Why Housing Matters initiative. She was included in the initiative's public service announcement (PSA) which asked Americans to rethink their views on public housing and consider how it benefits people in their own communities.

== Personal life ==
Jewel is the daughter of Atz Kilcher, who stars in the Discovery Channel show Alaska: The Last Frontier. All three of her brothers live in Alaska.

Her first cousin once removed is actress Q'orianka Kilcher who is best known for her role as Pocahontas in The New World (2005).

Jewel has been estranged from her mother (who served as her business manager) since 2003, when Jewel accused her of stealing millions of dollars from her.

Jewel and actor Sean Penn began dating in 1995 after Penn spotted her performing on Late Night with Conan O'Brien. Penn invited Jewel to compose a song for his film The Crossing Guard and followed her on tour.

Three years later, Jewel and rodeo cowboy Ty Murray started dating, and were married in The Bahamas in 2008, after having been together for a decade. Following the birth of her son in 2011, Jewel reduced her touring and recording schedule for several years. In interviews, she has described prioritizing parenting during that period, and she has discussed how her focus on emotional wellbeing informed later public work connected to mental health. In 2014, after nearly six years of marriage, the couple divorced.

In a 2022 interview with Mental, Jewel talks about how she started having panic attacks at age sixteen. Unbeknownst to her then, she employed the principles of cognitive behavioral therapy (CBT), particularly visualization, to manage them.

Jewel has said: "I don't think I started off young as a feminist. I read a lot of books in Alaska, I was pretty isolated where I grew up, and I think that I never thought I was any different than a man; I was raised in a place where pioneer women were very strong still. They'd shoe horses and build their own homes and were very self-sufficient. It wasn't really until I've gotten older that I really became a fan of women. And a fan of what women are capable of balancing and achieving, by just being them."

On January 20, 2025, Jewel made a surprise performance, singing "Over the Rainbow" for Robert F. Kennedy Jr. and Cheryl Hines at the Make America Healthy Again (MAHA) Inauguration Ball held during the second inauguration of Donald Trump, father of her close friend Ivanka Trump. She later apologized and expressed her support for the LGBTQIA+ community.

== Accolades ==
| Year | Award | Work | Category | Result | Ref. |
|---|---|---|---|---|---|
| 1994 | San Diego Music Awards | Herself | Best Acoustic | Won | |
| 1995 | San Diego Music Awards | Herself | Best Acoustic | Won | |
| 1995 | San Diego Music Awards | Herself | Artist of the Year | Won | |
| 1995 | San Diego Music Awards | Pieces of You | Album of the Year | Won | |
| 1996 | San Diego Music Awards | Herself | Artist of the Year | Won | |
| 1996 | MTV Video Music Awards | "Who Will Save Your Soul" | Best Female Video | Nominated | |
| 1996 | MTV Video Music Awards | "Who Will Save Your Soul" | Best New Artist | Nominated | |
| 1997 | ASCAP Pop Music Awards | "Who Will Save Your Soul" | Most Performed Song | Won | |
| 1997 | Grammy Award | "Who Will Save Your Soul" | Best Female Pop Vocal Performance | Nominated | |
| 1997 | Grammy Award | Herself | Best New Artist | Nominated | |
| 1997 | American Music Awards | Herself | Favorite Pop/Rock New Artist | Won | |
| 1997 | GAFFA Awards (Denmark) | Herself | Best Foreign New Act | Nominated | |
| 1997 | Pollstar Concert Industry Awards | Herself | Best New Artist Tour | Nominated | |
| 1997 | Billboard Music Award | Herself | Top Artist | Nominated | |
| 1997 | Billboard Music Award | Herself | Top Hot 100 Artist | Nominated | |
| 1997 | Billboard Music Award | Herself | Top Hot 100 Artist – Female | Nominated | |
| 1997 | Billboard Music Award | Herself | Top Pop Artist | Nominated | |
| 1997 | Billboard Music Award | Herself | Top Pop Artist – Female | Nominated | |
| 1997 | Billboard Music Award | Herself | Top Billboard 200 Albums Artist | Nominated | |
| 1997 | Billboard Music Award | Herself | Top Billboard 200 Albums Artist – Female | Nominated | |
| 1997 | Billboard Music Award | Herself | Top Adult Contemporary Artist | Nominated | |
| 1997 | Billboard Music Award | Herself | Top Adult Top 40 Artist | Won | |
| 1997 | Billboard Music Award | Pieces of You | Top Billboard 200 Album | Nominated | |
| 1997 | Billboard Music Award | "Foolish Games" | Top Soundtrack Single | Nominated | |
| 1997 | Billboard Music Award | "You Were Meant for Me" | Top Hot 100 Song | Nominated | |
| 1997 | Billboard Music Award | "You Were Meant for Me" | Top Hot 100 Airplay Track | Nominated | |
| 1997 | Billboard Music Award | "You Were Meant for Me" | Top Adult Contemporary Single | Nominated | |
| 1997 | Billboard Music Award | "You Were Meant for Me" | Top Adult Top 40 Track | Nominated | |
| 1997 | MTV Video Music Award | "You Were Meant for Me" | Video of the Year | Nominated | |
| 1997 | MTV Video Music Award | "You Were Meant for Me" | Viewer's Choice | Nominated | |
| 1997 | MTV Video Music Award | "You Were Meant for Me" | Best Female Video | Won | |
| 1997 | Billboard Music Video Awards | "You Were Meant for Me" | FAN.tastic Award | Nominated | |
| 1997 | Billboard Music Video Awards | "Foolish Games" | Best New Artist Clip (Jazz/AC) | Won | |
| 1997 | VH1 Vogue Fashion Awards | "Foolish Games" | Most Fashionable Video | Nominated | |
| 1997 | Online Film & Television Association | "Foolish Games" | Best Adapted Song | Nominated | |
| 1998 | Grammy Award | "Foolish Games" | Best Female Pop Vocal Performance | Nominated | |
| 1998 | NARM Awards | Pieces of You | Best Selling Alternative Album | Won | |
| 1998 | American Music Awards | Pieces of You | Favorite Pop/Rock Album | Nominated | |
| 1998 | American Music Awards | Herself | Favorite Female Pop/Rock Artist | Nominated | |
| 1998 | APRA Music Awards | "You Were Meant for Me" | Most Performed Foreign Work | Nominated | |
| 1998 | Online Music Awards | Herself | Best Female Singer | Won | |
| 1998 | Blockbuster Entertainment Awards | Pieces of You | Favorite CD | Won | |
| 1999 | Blockbuster Entertainment Awards | Herself | Favorite Female Artist | Won | |
| 1999 | Governor's Awards | Herself | Songwriting Award | Won | |
| 1999 | Glamour Awards | Herself | Woman of the Year | Won | |
| 1999 | Audie Awards | A Night Without Armor | Best Spoken Word Album | Won | |
| 1999 | ASCAP Pop Music Awards | "Foolish Games" | Most Performed Songs | Won | |
| 1999 | ASCAP Pop Music Awards | "You Were Meant for Me" | Most Performed Songs | Won | |
| 1999 | BMI Pop Awards | "You Were Meant for Me" | Award-Winning Song | Won | |
| 1999 | Billboard Music Video Awards | "Hands" | Best Jazz/AC Clip | Won | |
| 2000 | California Music Awards | Herself | Outstanding Female Vocalist | Nominated | |
| 2000 | Online Music Awards | Herself | Favorite Tattooed Artist | Nominated | |
| 2002 | MVPA Awards | "Standing Still" | Best Adult Contemporary Video | Won | |
| 2002 | MVPA Awards | "Standing Still" | Best Direction of a Female Artist | Nominated | |
| 2003 | Radio Music Awards | Herself | Favorite Female Artist—Modern Rock | Won | |
| 2003 | Radio Music Awards | "Intuition" | Best Hook Up Song | Nominated | |
| 2003 | Regis & Kelly Awards | Herself | Favorite Musical Guest | Won | |
| 2004 | ASCAP Pop Music Awards | "Intuition" | Most Performed Song | Won | |
| 2004 | BDSCertified Spin Awards | "Standing Still" | 300,000 Spins | Won | |
| 2004 | Groovevolt Music and Fashion Awards | "Leave the Lights On" | Best Pop Deep Cut | Nominated | |
| 2011 | American Country Awards | Herself | Female Artist of the Year | Nominated | |
| 2011 | Grammy Awards | "Satisfied" | Best Female Country Vocal Performance | Nominated | |
| 2014 | Prism Awards | "Ring of Fire" | Performance in a TV Movie or Miniseries | Nominated | |

== Tours ==
- 1997: Tiny Lights Tour
- 1997: Papillion Tour
- 1999: Spirit World Tour
- 2002: This Way World Tour
- 2002: New Wild West Acoustic Tour
- 2003-04: 0304 Acoustic Tour
- 2005: Tour For No Reason
- 2008: Goodbye Alice In Wonderland Tour
- 2009: Perfectly Clear Acoustic Tour
- 2009: Lullaby Acoustic Tour
- 2010: Star Light Café Tour
- 2013: Greatest Hits Tour
- 2016: Picking Up the Pieces Tour
- 2017, 2018: Handmade Holiday Tour

Co-headlining

- 1997: Lilith Fair (with various artists)

Opening act

- 1995 Opening act for Peter Murphy
- 2006: Something to Be Tour (for Rob Thomas)
- 2008: Paisley Party Tour (for Brad Paisley)
- 2022: AM Gold Tour (for Train)

Cancelled

- 2003: 0304 World Tour

== Discography ==
- Pieces of You (1995)
- Spirit (1998)
- Joy: A Holiday Collection (1999)
- This Way (2001)
- 0304 (2003)
- Goodbye Alice in Wonderland (2006)
- Perfectly Clear (2008)
- Lullaby (2009)
- Sweet and Wild (2010)
- The Merry Goes 'Round (2011)
- Let It Snow: A Holiday Collection (2013)
- Picking Up the Pieces (2015)
- Freewheelin' Woman (2022)

== Videography ==
| Video | Year | Notes |
|---|---|---|
| Jewel: A Life Uncommon | 1999 | An intimate documentary on VHS and DVD featuring live performances and candid interviews. |
| Live at Humphrey's By The Bay | 2004 | Filmed during two sold-out performances in 2002 at the San Diego venue. Bonus features include interviews, live footage from her This Way Tour, and a photo gallery. Available only on DVD. |
| Jewel: The Essential Live Songbook | 2008 | This DVD/Blu-ray home video combines two concerts that were broadcast in 2007 for the television program Soundstage (at the Rialto Theatre including some numbers with orchestra, and the Meyerson Symphony Center); and four songs from Red Rocks. Bonus features are an interview and music video. The concerts are also available separately for streaming. |

== Filmography ==
Film and television
| Year | Title | Role | Notes |
|---|---|---|---|
| 1995 | The Wizard of Oz in Concert: Dreams Come True | Dorothy Gale | Television concert special |
| 1999 | Ride with the Devil | Sue Lee Shelley | |
| 2002 | The Rutles 2: Can't Buy Me Lunch | Herself (as Jewel) | Television film |
| 2003 | The Lyon's Den | Jennifer Matthews | 1 episode |
| 2006 | The Young and the Restless | Herself | 1 episode |
| 2006 | Men in Trees | Herself | 1 episode |
| 2006 | Las Vegas | Herself | 1 episode |
| 2006 | 7th Heaven | Herself | 1 episode |
| 2007 | Walk Hard: The Dewey Cox Story | Herself | |
| 2007–2008 | Nashville Star | Herself / Judge | 10 episodes |
| 2008 | CSI: Crime Scene Investigation | Herself | Season 8 episode: Bull |
| 2009 | Dancing with the Stars | Herself / Various | 9 episodes |
| 2011 | The Incurables | Herself / Host | 13 episodes |
| 2011 | Platinum Hit | Herself / Host | 10 episodes |
| 2012 | The Voice | Herself / Adviser | 4 episodes |
| 2013 | Ring of Fire | June Carter Cash | Television film |
| 2014 | Dora the Explorer | Cheshire Cat | 1 episode; voice role |
| 2015 | Axe Cop | Tear Sparrow | 1 episode |
| 2015 | Our Journey Home | Narrator | Documentary film |
| 2016 | Holiday Homecoming with Jewel | Herself | |
| 2016 | Comedy Central Roast of Rob Lowe | Herself | TV special |
| 2016–2017 | Alaska: The Last Frontier | Herself | 6 episodes |
| 2017 | Lost in America | Herself | Documentary film |
| 2017 | Sandy Wexler | Testimonial (as Jewel) | |
| 2017 | Framed for Murder: A Fixer Upper Mystery | Shannon Hughes | Television film (Hallmark Movies & Mysteries) |
| 2017 | Concrete Evidence: A Fixer Upper Mystery | Shannon Hughes | Television film (Hallmark Movies & Mysteries) |
| 2018 | Deadly Deed: A Fixer Upper Mystery | Shannon Hughes | Television film (Hallmark Movies & Mysteries) |
| 2018 | Shimmer and Shine | Misha | 2 episodes; voice role |
| 2018 | Undercover Boss | Herself | 1 episode |
| 2021–2024 | The Masked Singer | Queen Of Hearts | 12 episodes; Contestant and winner on season 6 (2021), Performer (2023) and Masked Ambassador (2024) |
| 2022 | I Can See Your Voice | Herself | Guest Panelist and Performer; 1 episode |
| 2022 | American Song Contest | Herself | Contestant representing Alaska; 1 episode |
| 2025 | Lilith Fair: Building a Mystery | Herself | Documentary film |

=== Other credits ===
| Year | Title | Role | Notes |
|---|---|---|---|
| 2017 | Framed for Murder: A Fixer Upper Mystery | Executive producer | Television film (Hallmark Movies & Mysteries) |
| 2017 | Concrete Evidence: A Fixer Upper Mystery | Executive producer | Television film (Hallmark Movies & Mysteries) |
| 2018 | Deadly Deed: A Fixer Upper Mystery | Executive producer | Television film (Hallmark Movies & Mysteries) |
| 2018 | Lost in America | Executive producer | Documentary film |
| 2020 | The Mindfulness Movement | Executive producer | Documentary film |

== Works cited ==
- Atkinson, Brian T. (2011). I'll Be Here in the Morning: The Songwriting Legacy of Townes Van Zandt. Texas A&M University Press. ISBN 978-1-603-44526-9.
- DeMain, Bill (2004). In Their Own Words: Songwriters Talk about the Creative Process. Prager. ISBN 978-0-275-98402-1.
- Kilcher, Jewel (2016). Never Broken: Songs Are Only Half the Story. Penguin. ISBN 978-0-399-18572-4.
- McFarland, P. J. (1998). Angel Standing By: The Story of Jewel. St. Martin's Griffin. ISBN 978-0-312-19827-5.
