= 2 Become 1 (Jewel song) =

Single by Jewel

from the album 0304
- B-side: "Sweet Temptation"
- Released: December 16, 2003
- Studio: Conway Studios, Hollywood, California
- Genre: Pop rock
- Length: 4:40 (album version)
- Label: Atlantic
- Songwriters: Jewel Kilcher; Guy Chambers
- Producers: Jewel Kilcher; Lester Mendez

Jewel singles chronology
"Stand" (2003)	"2 Become 1" (2003)	"Again and Again" (2006)

"2 Become 1" is a song by American pop singer–songwriter Jewel from her fifth studio album, 0304 (2003). Written by Jewel and Guy Chambers and produced by Jewel and Lester Mendez (who co-wrote and co-produced 0304's two previous singles, "Intuition" and "Stand"), the song was released as the album's third and final single in December 2003. It failed to chart on the Billboard Hot 100 and all other Billboard charts except for the Hot Adult Top 40 Tracks, where it peaked at number 33 in late January 2004. The single also charted moderately in Australia at number 49.

In 2008 the song was re-recorded and retitled "Two Become One" for Jewel's country album, Perfectly Clear, produced by John Rich.

== Background and writing ==
"2 Become 1" was co-written by Guy Chambers who is best known for his songwriting partnership with Robbie Williams and produced by Kilcher and Lester Mendez. The song later appeared on her sixth album "Perfectly Clear" (2008) in a new country version that was re-titled, "Two Become One".

On the song, Jewel is concentrating on only the moment she's having with her lover and not the entire relationship. In the first verse, she sings, "don’t move/this mood is a painting." In a part of the lyric, she sings that "I watch you while you are sleeping/Messy hair, chest bare, moonlight on your skin/I want to breathe you in."

== Critical reception ==
While being a single from "0304", the song received positive reviews. "Traveling to the Heart" wrote a positive review, writing that "Jewel is genuine and open throughout. Finally, she sounds relaxed and not as uptight as she has in her previous singles." The article also said that "It’s an uptempo ballad with a romantic, tender feel. Although the music arrangement sounds like a peppier Sarah McLachlan song, it’s a major improvement over her last efforts." Ron Slomowicz from About.com wrote that the song evokes "retro-Jewel".

== Single information ==
The single received no form of editing or remixing for its American release. An Australian commercial single was released with the track labelled as the 'radio edit', but this is just the 4:40 album version.

== Music video ==
"2 Become 1" is the second single by Jewel not to have a music video as well as her first single released within the U.S. without a video (the first was 1997's "Morning Song", not released in the U.S.). However, some music video stations played a live version of the song featuring footage from concerts.

== Track listings and formats ==
U.S. CD single

1. "2 Become 1" – 4:40
2. "Sweet Temptation" – 4:10

Australian CD single

1. "2 Become 1" (Radio Edit) – 4:40
2. "Stand" (Mike Rizzo Remix)
3. "Intuition" (Ford's Extended Mix)

== Charts ==
Chart (2004)	Peak position
Australia (ARIA)	49
US Adult Pop Airplay (Billboard)	33
