= Fragile Heart =

Fragile Heart may refer to:

- "Fragile Heart", a 2000 song by Yolanda Adams
- "Fragile Heart", a 2000 song by Westlife
- "Fragile Heart" (Jewel song), a 2003 song by Jewel
- The Fragile Heart, a 1996 television drama written by Paula Milne
