= Stay Here Forever =

Single by Jewel

from the album Sweet and Wild and Valentine's Day
- Released: January 19, 2010
- Studio: Aimeeland Studios (Brentwood, TN); The Jewel Box (Stephensville, TX); Blackbird Studio (Nashville, TN)
- Genre: Country
- Length: 2:59
- Label: Valory
- Songwriters: Jewel Kilcher, Dallas Davidson, Bobby Pinson
- Producer: Nathan Chapman

Jewel singles chronology
"Somewhere Over the Rainbow" (2009)	"Stay Here Forever" (2010)	"Satisfied" (2010)

Music video
- "Stay Here Forever" at CMT.com

"Stay Here Forever" is a song written by Jewel, Dallas Davidson, and Bobby Pinson and recorded by American recording artist Jewel. It was released to country radio in January 2010 and as a music download on February 9, 2010, and serves as the lead song for the movie Valentine's Day, as well as the lead-off single to Jewel's second country album, Sweet and Wild, which was released on June 8, 2010, via Valory Music Group. The song is Jewel's first chart single on the country charts since "Till It Feels Like Cheating," which peaked at number 57 in November 2008.

== Content ==
"Stay Here Forever" is a country ballad, backed primarily by percussion with occasional fiddle fills. The song's female narrator describes the feelings of being in love and lists several ideas of places to go and things to do with her lover. In assuring him that she's OK with anything as long as she spends it with him, she concludes that they don't have to go anywhere, and can simply "stay here forever."

== Critical reception ==
Jonathan Keefe from Slant Magazine said that the song "lacks a strong hook and instead tries to coast by on empty clichés like 'This feels so right/It can't be wrong.' The song's relative simplicity is really all it has going for it, but it's a fair sight better than some of the album's other love songs." Matt Bjorke of Roughstock gave the song a positive review, highlighting that the "vocal is completely chock full-o-charm," and drawing comparisons to fellow country artist Pam Tillis. Leeann Ward of Country Universe rated the song a C, referring to the song as "embarrassing" for an artist "once applauded for her introspective songs and uniquely intriguing voice." Having been produced by Taylor Swift's producer Nathan Chapman, stating that it "sounds as though it is purposely reaching to be like a Swift song, but still manages to miss the mark by not sounding nearly as credible." Juli Thanki of Engine 145 gave the song a thumbs down, described it as "exactly how you’d expect a song from a romantic comedy to sound: an inoffensive distraction while it’s on, but quickly forgotten." She elaborated on this, saying that the vocal performance and melody were "largely unmemorable" and not up to par with Jewel's previous releases (including her last Top 40 country hit "I Do").

== Music video ==
The music video, which was directed by Peter Zavadil, was filmed in January 2010 and premiered on CMT on February 1, 2010. In the video, Jewel portrays a florist in a floral shop arranging flowers, while performing the song. Throughout a second version of the video, scenes of the various couples in the movie Valentine's Day are shown between shots of Jewel, who puts on a little makeup and removes her jacket before turning out the shop lights and heading out.

== Track listing ==
US Promo

1. Stay Here Forever (radio edit)
2. Stay Here Forever (soundtrack version)

"Stay Here Forever" is the ninth single that Jewel has re-recorded vocals for. This is the first single where the instrumental arrangement remains the same, however the vocals are slightly different on both versions. The 'radio edit' is available on the album "Sweet & Wild" while the 'soundtrack version' appears on the "Valentine's Day" soundtrack.

== Chart performance ==
"Stay Here Forever" debuted at number 58 on the U.S. Billboard Hot Country Songs chart for the week of January 30, 2010. In its fifth week on the chart it entered the Top 40, her first since "I Do" reached number 38 in June 2008. After 14 weeks on the chart, the song reached a peak of number 34 for the week of May 1, 2010.

Chart (2010)	Peak Position
US Hot Country Songs (Billboard)	34
