= Perfectly Clear =

Studio album by Jewel
- Released: June 3, 2008
- Recorded: Late 2006 – early 2008
- Genre: Country
- Length: 40:45
- Label: Valory
- Producer: Jewel; John Rich

Jewel chronology
Goodbye Alice in Wonderland (2006)	Perfectly Clear (2008)	Lullaby (2009)

Singles from Perfectly Clear
- 1. "Stronger Woman" Released: February 11, 2008; 2. "I Do" Released: June 23, 2008; 3. "Till It Feels Like Cheating" Released: October 27, 2008

Professional ratings
Aggregate scores
Source	Rating
Metacritic	69/100
Review scores
Source	Rating
About.com	4.5/5 stars
AllMusic	3/5 stars
Billboard	positive
Entertainment Weekly	B+
Los Angeles Times	2.5/4 stars
The New York Times	positive
Rolling Stone	2.5/5 stars
Slant Magazine	3.5/5 stars
USA Today	3/4 stars

Perfectly Clear is the seventh studio album recorded by American singer Jewel. Her first album of country music, it was released on Valory Records (an imprint of Big Machine Records) on June 3, 2008.

== Album description ==
The album is composed of a mixture of new and old fan-favorite songs, although only one of the songs had previously appeared on one of her albums. "2 Become 1", from 0304 appeared in a new country version that was re-titled, "Two Become One". Its lead single, "Stronger Woman", peaked at #13 on the Billboard Hot Country Songs chart. John Rich, one half of the country rock duo Big & Rich, produced the album.

"I Do", was released to country radio on June 23, 2008 as the album's second single, which peaked in the Top 40. "Till It Feels Like Cheating" was released on October 27, 2008 as the third single, but only stayed on the charts for one week debuting and peaking at #57. Perfectly Clear debuted at #8 on the Billboard 200 with 48,000 copies. The album was released in Australia on May 29, 2009. It was released across Europe in June 2009. The European edition also includes the video for the first single "Stronger Woman". As of June 2010, the album has sold 370,000 copies worldwide, including 240,000 in the U.S.

== Critical reception ==
The album received generally favorable reviews. Rolling Stone magazine gave a mixed review, giving the album 2.5 stars out of 5. The reviewer said that "Jewel doesn't call upon the gritty storytelling of a real Nashville star […] the album is overcrowded by placid soft-rock tunes like "Two Become One" and "Anyone But You" with schmaltzy choruses and flavorless piano-laden verses." Allmusic gave a mixed review too, giving the album 3 stars out of 5. The reviewer also criticized Rich's production and the "poppy, simple songs about relationships […] but it does mean it feels more like the Jewel that everybody came to love back in 1995[.]"

A positive review came from Entertainment Weekly, which received the album well, calling Jewel an "earnest storyteller", and Billboard magazine, which said that the album "is not only persuasive, but down-home, old-school country." The New York Times gave the album an ambivalent review, saying that Jewel's voice was "sharp [and] assured" but criticizing the production.

== Track listing ==
No.	Title	Writer(s)	Length
1.	"Stronger Woman"	Jewel Kilcher, Marv Green	4:02
2.	"I Do"	Kilcher	4:04
3.	"Love Is a Garden"	Kilcher, Shaye Smith	3:48
4.	"Rosey and Mick"	Kilcher	3:36
5.	"Anyone but You"	Kilcher, Wynn Varble	3:55
6.	"Thump Thump"	Kilcher	3:57
7.	"Two Become One"	Kilcher, Guy Chambers	3:44
8.	"Till It Feels Like Cheating"	Lisa Carver, Liz Rose	4:00
9.	"Everything Reminds Me of You"	Kilcher, Joe Firstman	3:15
10.	"Loved by You (Cowboy Waltz)"	Kilcher	3:28
11.	"Perfectly Clear"	Kilcher	2:56

== Personnel ==
- Jewel – vocals, acoustic guitar
- Jason Freese – Wurlitzer electric piano, Mellotron, Hammond B3 organ, strings (1)
- Mike Rojas – acoustic piano, Wurlitzer electric piano, accordion, Hammond B3 organ
- Danny Rader – acoustic guitars, hi-string guitar, bouzouki
- Adam Shoenfeld – electric guitars
- Mike Johnson – steel guitar
- Jonathan Yudkin – banjo, bouzouki, dulcimer, fiddle, mandolin, viola
- Mike Brignardello – bass guitar
- Ethan Pilzer – bass guitar
- Glenn Worf – bass guitar
- Steve Brewster – drums
- Eric Darken – percussion
- John Rich – harmony vocals (2, 7)
- Wes Hightower – harmony vocals (4, 5)
- Liana Manis – harmony vocals (4, 5)

=== Production ===
- Jewel – producer
- John Rich – producer
- Bart Pursley – recording
- Steve Beers – recording assistant (1)
- Lowell Reynolds – recording assistant
- Paul Hart – additional engineer
- Vance Powell – additional engineer
- Christopher Rowe – mixing
- Sean Truskowski – mix assistant
- Hank Williams – mastering at MasterMix (Nashville, Tennessee)
- Bethany Newman – art direction, design
- Joshua Sage Newman – art direction, design
- Kurt Markus – photography

== Charts ==
=== Weekly charts ===
Chart (2008)	Peak position
Australian Albums (ARIA)	118
Australian Country Albums (ARIA)	7
UK Country Albums (OCC)	8
US Billboard 200	8
US Top Country Albums (Billboard)	1

=== Year-end charts ===
Chart (2008)	Position
US Top Country Albums (Billboard)	37

=== Singles ===
Year	Single	Chart positions		
Year	Single	US Country	US	US Pop
2008	"Stronger Woman"	13	84	95
2008	"I Do"	38	—	—
2008	"Till It Feels Like Cheating"	57	—	—

== Release history ==
Country	Date
United States	June 3, 2008
Canada	June 3, 2008
Australia	May 29, 2009
Austria	June 3, 2009
Germany	June 3, 2009
United Kingdom	June 22, 2009
Spain	June 22, 2009
Denmark	June 22, 2009
