= Again and Again (Jewel song) =

Single by Jewel

from the album Goodbye Alice in Wonderland
- B-side: Long Slow Side [Live Acoustic Version]”; “Foolish Games [Live Acoustic Version]
- Released: February 1, 2006
- Genre: pop rock; folk; folk rock
- Length: 3:45
- Label: Atlantic
- Songwriters: Jewel Kilcher; John Shanks
- Producer: Rob Cavallo

Jewel singles chronology
"2 Become 1" (2004)	"Again and Again" (2006)	"Good Day" (2006)

"Again and Again" is the lead single taken from Jewel's fifth studio album, Goodbye Alice in Wonderland. Written by Jewel and John Shanks and produced by Rob Cavallo, the song was Jewel's fifth single released to airways that did not receive any form of remixing. A radio version was released on a 1 track European promo CD which simply sped up the tempo of the song (the same thing was done for the radio edit of "2 Become 1".)

The single eventually became the most added song to AC radio stations in the US. However, as the lead single from the album, it didn't do as well as her previous lead singles ("Who Will Save Your Soul", Hands", "Standing Still" and "Intuition").

== Critical reception ==
Stephen Thomas Erlewine from Allmusic described the song as one of her best pop songs and picked it as one of the album's best tracks. Preston Jones from Slant Magazine wrote that the track is a slick, radio-ready ditty as vacuous as it is catchy." Catie James from Blogcritics wrote that the track has "addictive cadence".

== Music video ==
The music video was officially released to television around March 2006. The video was directed by Matthew Rolston, and featured Jewel walking around a farm house and a plantation. While relatively plotless, the end of the video shows Jewel finding the man she sings about in the song, played by then-husband, rodeo star Ty Murray.

== Commercial release ==
"Again and Again" received no commercial release within the US besides a promotional single (those are not available for purchase). A digital download single wasn't even released in the US for purchase, which even contributed to the lower chart position on the Billboard Hot 100 Singles Charts. However, international singles were issued. For the international release of the CD Single, a different single cover was used. The cover shown above is the cover for the US release of the Promotional Single.

US Promotional Single

1. Again and Again [Album Version]

International CD Single

1. Again and Again [Album Version]
2. Long Slow Slide [Live Acoustic Version]
3. Foolish Games [Live Acoustic Version]

== Chart performance ==
Chart (2006)	Peak Position
Australia (ARIA)	38
Canada Hot AC (Radio & Records)	22
UK Singles (Official Charts Company)	196
US Billboard Hot 100	80
US Adult Contemporary (Billboard)	37
US Adult Pop Airplay (Billboard)	16
US Digital Song Sales (Billboard)	53
US Pop 100	61
