= Satisfied (Jewel song) =

Single by Jewel

from the album Sweet and Wild
- Released: May 17, 2010
- Studio: Aimeeland Studios (Brentwood, TN); The Jewel Box (Stephensville, TX)
- Genre: Country
- Length: 4:09 (album version); 3:41 (radio edit)
- Label: Valory Music Group
- Songwriters: Jewel, Liz Rose
- Producer: Nathan Chapman

Jewel singles chronology
"Stay Here Forever" (2010)	"Satisfied" (2010)	"Ten" (2010)

Music video
- "Satisfied" at CMT.com

"Satisfied" is a song performed by American recording artist Jewel, taken from her second country album, Sweet and Wild. It was released in May 2010, as the second single from the album, which was released on June 8, 2010, via Valory Music Group. Written by Jewel herself and Liz Rose and produced by Nathan Chapman, the song is a country ballad, that advises people to declare for the one their love. It received favorable reviews from music critics and received a Grammy Nomination on the Best Country Vocal Performance, Female. The song was a very minor hit on the Country Songs chart, but it charted better on the Adult contemporary charts.

== Background ==
Backed by shakers and a piano melody, Jewel sings about "Letting someone know you love them, while you can." She said on her website: "Hands down my favorite message on the album. This is up there with 'Hands,' and 'Life Uncommon' for me. I really believe we don't always know what it takes to be happy and satisfied. Sometimes it's simpler than we know: finding those you love and letting them know you do. To me that is the definition of the word. My favorite spot is the bridge 'horses are built to run, the sun was meant to shine above, flowers were made to bloom, and then there's us - we were born to love.'" Jewel told The Tennessean about the inspiration for the song: "My husband (Ty Murray) and I have talked a lot about what is happiness and what makes a person happy. It's funny because I feel like we all are interested in happiness, but I feel like very few of us sit down to actually see how much we're doing in our day lends to our happiness. It also seems like when you're a kid you have all these goals about what you want your life to become. Now when you accomplish those goals, you have to re-evaluate and see if they are making you happy because what makes a person feel satisfied might be different than what you thought."

== Reception ==
Jim Malec of The 9513.com gave the song a thumbs down, referring to it as compromised by a "body of experience subliminally pushing her to conform, to polish, to rein in her songwriting’s farthest-straying loose ends." Although, he spoke positively of the song's vocal performance and melody, but concluded that the song was "so far removed from anything musically related to “country” that it would sound tame and out of place even in the current format." Country Week review, said that: "the ballad “Satisfied” imparts wisdom with heartfelt emotion. Though her classy, docile voice may be overshadowed by more theatrical singers in country music, Jewel's gems neatly toe the line between art and commerce". The song was nominated for "Best Country Vocal Performance by Female" at the 53rd Grammy Awards, Jewel's first Grammy nomination since 1998.

== Music video ==
The music video, which was directed by Peter Zavadil, premiered on CMT on May 17, 2010. In the video, Jewel performs the song on the stage of empty War Memorial Auditorium in Nashville, Tennessee. As the video progresses, people begin to enter the auditorium, and gradually become happier after listening to the song's uplifting message.

== Chart performance ==
"Satisfied" debuted at number 59 on the U.S. Billboard Hot Country Songs chart for the week of June 19, 2010, and reached a peak position of number 57 in its second chart week.

Chart (2010)	Peak Position
US Hot Country Songs (Billboard)	57
US Adult Contemporary (Billboard)	27
