= Sweet and Wild =

Studio album by Jewel
- Released: June 8, 2010
- Recorded: 2009–2010
- Studio: Aimeeland Studio (Brentwood, Tennessee); Pain In The Art Studio, Dogwood Studio, Jane's Place, Blackbird Studios and Sound Stage Studios (Nashville, Tennessee); The Jewel Box (Stephenville, Texas)
- Genre: Country
- Length: 39:27
- Label: Valory Music Group
- Producer: Jewel; Nathan Chapman

Jewel chronology
Lullaby (2009)	Sweet and Wild (2010)	The Merry Goes 'Round (2011)

Alternative cover
- Deluxe edition cover

Singles from Sweet and Wild
- 1. "Stay Here Forever" Released: January 19, 2010; 2. "Satisfied" Released: May 17, 2010; 3. "Ten" Released: September 13, 2010

Sweet and Wild is the ninth studio album by American recording artist Jewel. It was released on June 8, 2010, through Valory Music Group as her second country album with the label. The song "Stay Here Forever" was released as a single from the soundtrack of Valentine's Day and as the lead-off single to the album. It was a minor Top 30 hit on the U.S. Billboard Hot Country Songs chart. The album's second single, "Satisfied", was released on May 17, 2010, and debuted at #59 on the U.S. Billboard Hot Country Songs chart for the week of June 19, 2010. The album debuted at number eleven on the Billboard 200, with sales of 32,000 copies.

== About the album ==
Jewel is maintaining her country roots as she returns to the format with her second follow-up album, Sweet and Wild. The album, written and produced by Jewel, was released on June 8. The first single, "Stay Here Forever," has been embraced by critics and the video is a success on CMT and GAC.

"The theme of this album is finding what's true about you and your life, and defending it and valuing it above all else," said Jewel. "My newest country album will share so many of my personal feelings of love and happiness that I have written into the songs," said Jewel, who married her longtime boyfriend Ty Murray in the summer of 2008. Jewel will also embark on a tour sponsored by Country Financial to support Sweet and Wild.

== Track listing ==
The official track listing was announced on Amazon.com.

No.	Title	Writer(s)	Length
1.	"No Good in Goodbye"	Jewel Kilcher	3:24
2.	"I Love You Forever"	Jewel, Rick Nowels	4:25
3.	"Fading"	Kilcher	3:35
4.	"What You Are"	Kilcher, Dave Berg	3:40
5.	"Bad as It Gets"	Michael Mobley, Rachel Proctor	3:54
6.	"Summer Home in Your Arms"	Kilcher	2:55
7.	"Stay Here Forever"	Kilcher, Dallas Davidson, Bobby Pinson	3:00
8.	"No More Heartaches"	Kilcher	2:49
9.	"One True Thing"	Kilcher, Brett James	4:14
10.	"Ten"	Kilcher, Berg	3:25
11.	"Satisfied"	Kilcher, Liz Rose	4:09
12.	"Angel Needs a Ride" (iTunes)" (bonus track)

=== Deluxe edition ===
The album's deluxe edition is a 2 disc package that includes the standard album, and an album with the original live acoustic versions of the tracks.

==== Disc 1 ====
1. "No Good in Goodbye"
2. "I Love You Forever"
3. "Fading"
4. "What You Are"
5. "Bad as It Gets"
6. "Summer Home in Your Arms"
7. "Stay Here Forever"
8. "No More Heartaches"
9. "One True Thing"
10. "Ten"
11. "Satisfied"

==== Disc 2 ====
1. "No Good in Goodbye" (acoustic)
2. "I Love You Forever" (acoustic)
3. Fading" (acoustic)
4. "What You Are" (acoustic)
5. "Bad as It Gets" (acoustic)
6. "Summer Home in Your Arms" (acoustic)
7. "Stay Here Forever" (acoustic)
8. "No More Heartaches" (acoustic)
9. "One True Thing" (acoustic)
10. "Ten" (acoustic)
11. "Satisfied" (acoustic)
12. "Angel Needs a Ride" (iTunes pre-order track)

== Personnel ==
- Jewel – vocals, backing vocals, acoustic guitar
- Tim Lauer – acoustic piano, Rhodes electric piano, synthesizers, accordion, Hammond B3 organ, flute
- Nathan Chapman – keyboards, acoustic guitar, classical guitar, electric guitars, steel guitar, percussion, harmony vocals
- Ilya Toshinsky – keyboards, acoustic piano, synthesizers, programming, acoustic guitar, hi-string acoustic guitar, banjo, mandolin, percussion
- Ken Halford – acoustic piano, acoustic guitar
- Jason Freese – Mellotron, glockenspiel
- Mike Johnson – steel guitar
- Tim Marks – bass guitar
- Jimmie Lee Sloas – bass guitar
- Nick Buda – drums
- Eric Darken – percussion
- Stuart Duncan – fiddle
- Jonathan Yudkin – strings, string arrangements

=== Production ===
- Scott Borschetta – executive producer
- Jewel – producer
- Nathan Chapman – producer, mixing (1–6, 8–11)
- Chad Carlson – recording (1–6, 8–11)
- Justin Niebank – recording (7), mixing (7)
- Chuck Ainlay – mixing (7)
- David Bryant – recording assistant (1–6, 8–11)
- Matt Rausch – assistant engineer (1–6, 8–11)
- Drew Bollman – recording assistant (7), mix assistant (7)
- Ken Halford – additional recording, additional engineer (1–6, 8–11)
- Dan Hansen – additional recording (1, 3–6, 8–10)
- Jeremy Hunter – additional recording (1, 2, 4, 10, 11), additional engineer (3, 5, 6, 8, 9, 11)
- Eric Darken – additional recording (6, 8)
- Neal Cappelino – additional engineer (1–6, 8–11)
- Brian David Willis – additional engineer (1–6, 8–11)
- Jim Cooley – mix assistant (7)
- Hank Williams – mastering at MasterMix (Nashville, Tennessee)
- Jason Campbell – production coordinator
- Whitney Sutton – copy coordinator
- Emily Mueller – production manager
- Ron Roark – graphic design
- Lynda Churilla – photography
- Sam Leonardi – hair stylist
- Jenna Anton – make-up
- Elise Wilson – wardrobe

== Critical reception ==
Professional ratings
Review scores
Source	Rating
AllMusic	4/5 stars
Entertainment Weekly	B−
Slant Magazine	2/5 stars
The Boston Globe	(mixed)
Engine 145	3/5 stars

Upon its release, Sweet and Wild received generally positive reviews from most music critics. At Metacritic, which assigns a normalized rating out of 100 to reviews from mainstream critics, the album received a better than average score of 62, based on 6 reviews, which indicates "generally favorable reviews". Stephen Thomas Erlewine from AllMusic gave the album 4 out of 5 stars, saying that "She’s saved here--on both the produced main album and its bare-bones acoustic cousin on the deluxe version, which isn’t as different as it might initially appear--by her essential sweetness, which shines through in her melody and mellow moods that aren’t sullied by a hint of wildness". The Slant Magazine review says that "While "Perfectly Clear" suggested that she has the potential to make a great country album, but the uneven Sweet and Wild certainly isn't it". The Boston Globe review noted that "Jewel offers basic country tropes both musical (twanging Telecasters, whining fiddles, banjoes bubbling underneath the surface, train-track rhythms) and lyrical (with references to both Wal-Mart and a dying soldier imparting wisdom) in the hopes of rousing the market base she first courted on 2008’s Perfectly Clear". Greg Kot from Entertainment Weekly gave a B- evaluation, saying that "The pedal steel and fiddle sound like add-ons designed to get her played on country radio, and a few of the melodies could've been hijacked from a Nashville jingles factory. But there's some moving midlife melancholy beneath the surface, especially on the startling 'Fading'".

== Singles ==
The song "Stay Here Forever" was released as a single from the soundtrack of Valentine's Day and as the lead-off single to the album. It was a minor Top 40 hit on the U.S. Billboard Hot Country Songs chart, reaching a peak of #34 on the chart. The album's second single, "Satisfied", was released on May 17, 2010, and debuted at #59 on the U.S. Billboard Hot Country Songs chart for the week of June 19, 2010. "Ten" was released as the album's third single on September 13, 2010, and debuted at #55 for the week of October 16, 2010.

== Notes ==
Jewel previously recorded a duet with Jason Michael Carroll on his first album Waitin' in the Country called "No Good in Goodbye". It is a completely different song from the one featured on this album.

The album's fourth track "What You Are" was chosen to be part of the runway-soundtrack for the 2010 Victoria's Secret Fashion Show.

== Chart performance ==
Due to digital pre-orders of the album, it debuted one week before official release at #64 on the Billboard Top Country Albums chart. On the Billboard 200, the album debuted at #11 as well as #3 on the Billboard Top Country Albums chart, with sales of 32,000 copies in its first week. As of November 2010, the album has sold 76,907 copies in the U.S.

Chart (2010)	Peak position
Australian Albums (ARIA)	179
UK Country Albums Chart	3
UK Independent Albums Chart	39
US Billboard 200	11
US Billboard Top Country Albums	3

=== Year-end charts ===
Chart (2010)	Position
US Billboard Top Country Albums	51
