= Stronger Woman =

Single by Jewel

from the album Perfectly Clear
- B-side: "Do You Believe Me Now" (Jimmy Wayne)
- Released: February 11, 2008 (U.S.)
- Recorded: 2007
- Genre: Country; country pop
- Length: 4:02 (Album Version); 3:49 (Single Version)
- Label: Valory
- Songwriters: Jewel Kilcher; Marv Green
- Producer: John Rich

Jewel singles chronology
"Quest for Love" (2007)	"Stronger Woman" (2008)	"I Do" (2008)

"Stronger Woman" is a song written by Marv Green and co-written and recorded by American recording artist Jewel. Her first release to country radio, it is also the first single from her album Perfectly Clear (2008), which was produced by John Rich of the country duo Big & Rich and released on the Valory imprint of Big Machine Records. "Stronger Woman" reached number 13 on both the Billboard Country Airplay and Hot Country Songs charts respectively. It also peaked at number 84 on the Hot 100 chart.

The single was released to iTunes exclusively on February 5, and officially sent to US radio on February 11, 2008. In late January, in its first week of unofficial release, Stronger Woman entered the Billboard Hot Country Songs chart at number 50.

== Critical reception ==
AllMusic's Stephen Thomas Erlewine chose it as a highlight from Perfectly Clear. Mandi Bierly of Entertainment Weekly called it "unremarkable radio fare."

== Music video ==
The video was filmed in Nashville, and on March 9, 2008 it made its debut on PerezHilton.com.

== Chart performance ==
On the week of February 23, 2008, "Stronger Woman" debuted at number 96 on the Billboard Hot 100, but left the next week. It reappeared on the week of April 5 at number 93, and peaked at number 84 the week of April 19, staying on the chart for ten weeks.

Chart (2008)	Peak position
US Billboard Hot 100	84
US Hot Country Songs (Billboard)	13
US Radio Songs (Billboard)	64

=== Year-end charts ===
Chart (2008)	Position
US Country Songs (Billboard)	59
