= Voodoo (Oh Land song) =

Single by Oh Land

from the album Oh Land
- Released: 1 April 2011
- Recorded: 2010
- Studio: Mr. Dan's (Streatham); Metropolis Studios (London)
- Genre: Synth-pop
- Length: 2:51
- Label: Fake Diamond; A:larm Music
- Songwriter(s): Nanna Øland Fabricius; Dan Carey
- Producer(s): Dan Carey

Oh Land singles chronology
"Wolf & I" (2011)	"Voodoo" (2011)	"White Nights" (2011)

"Voodoo" is a song by Danish singer-songwriter Oh Land from her second studio album Oh Land (2011). It was released digitally as the album's third single on 1 April 2011 by Fake Diamond Records and A:larm Music, exclusively in the United Kingdom. Nanna Øland Fabricius wrote the track in collaboration with its producer Dan Carey. A synth-pop song, it features spoken verses and a repetitive refrain where she sings "it's voodoo you do".

The single received a mixed reception from music critics who highlighted her genre combinations but downplayed the lyrics. A music video was not created for the single, but the singer performed it live on several occasions, like at the Heaven nightclub in London in February 2012. The performance was compared to ones by both Rihanna and Robyn.

== Background and composition ==
"Voodoo" is from Oh Land's second studio and first major-label album, Oh Land (2011). The record's third single overall, "Voodoo" was released as a digital download on 1 April 2011 by Fake Diamonds Records and A:larm Music. The download was made available exclusively in the United Kingdom and features the album version of "Voodoo". The song was written by both Oh Land and Dan Carey; the latter musician also solely produced "Voodoo". It was recorded in 2010 at Carey's home studios in Streatham while mixing occurred at Metropolis Studios in London.

"Voodoo" is a synth-pop song that lasts two minutes and fifty-one seconds. According to AllMusic's Andrew Leahey, the composition consists of Oh Land "layering spoken word verses over disco beats". Kim Skotte from Politiken felt the song was close to resembling teen pop music, whereas a critic for Billboard described it as a "quickie synth-pop" track. During the chorus, Oh Land repeats the same line consisting of "It's voodoo you do". John Calvert from Drowned in Sound jokingly suggested that the refrain originated from Reeves and Mortimer's comedy acts.

== Critical response ==
"Voodoo" divided music critics. Michael Jose Gonzalez, a writer for Gaffa, was appreciative that the singer chose not to follow the trends in the music industry and described the song as irresistible pop. Leahey from AllMusic felt that Oh Land's combination of spoken verses and disco worked together well. However, Sal Cinquemani from Slant Magazine found the track to be generic: "while a song like 'Voodoo' could break Oh Land to a wider pop audience, it isn’t anything Little Boots or La Roux aren’t already doing." Several reviewers were more critical of the song's lyrics. Drowned in Sound's John Calvert called the "vocal hook [among] the year's most irksome". Fraser McAlpine of BBC Music predicted that the refrain was bound "to get under a lot more skins that it is welcome to"; he also said that it "treads the same line between inspired and irritating as Marina and the Diamonds".

== Live performance ==
A music video for "Voodoo" was not created, but Oh Land has performed the song on several occasions, including at the Heaven nightclub in London in February 2012. During the event she sang every song from Oh Land with the exception of "Helicopter". The performance was compared to similar ones by Rihanna, but Tyler Kieron from The Arts Desk insisted that it was more along the lines of Robyn.

== Credits and personnel ==
Credits and personnel adapted from Oh Land liner notes.

Recording

- Recorded at Mr. Dan's Streathem (Streatham)
- Mixed at Metropolis Studios (London)

Personnel

- Nanna Øland Fabricius – vocals, lyrics, instruments
- Adam Ayan – mastering
- Ben Baptie – assistant mixing
- Dan Carey – production, lyrics, instruments, engineering
- Tom Elmhirst – mixing
- Jimmy Harry – lyrics
- Alexis Smith – engineering

== Release history ==
Region	Date	Format	Label
United Kingdom	1 April 2011	Digital download	Fake Diamond Records; A:larm Music
