= This Way (Jewel song) =

Single by Jewel

from the album This Way
- Released: June 12, 2002
- Genre: Pop
- Length: 4:16 (Album Version); 4:08 (Radio Remix)
- Label: Atlantic
- Songwriters: Jewel Kilcher; Rick Nowels
- Producers: Radio Remix: Jewel Kilcher; Dann Huff; John Shanks; Album Version: Jewel Kilcher; Dann Huff

Jewel singles chronology
"Break Me" (2002)	"This Way" (2002)	"Serve the Ego" (2002)

"This Way" is the title track and third single from American musician Jewel's fourth studio album, This Way (2001).

== Song information and chart performance ==
Like the majority of her singles, Atlantic Records requested Jewel to re-record "This Way" with a more pop overtone. The "Album Version" of the song proved too acoustic-sounding and downtempo for mainstream radio. The "Radio Remix" contained more percussion, background vocals, and an uptempo guitar arrangement.

The song spent four weeks in Billboard's Adult Pop Song chart and peaked at #36 in August 2002.

The song also appears in the soundtrack of the movie Enough, starring Jennifer Lopez.

== Music video ==
A music video featuring audio from the Radio Remix was shot for the song in 2002 and directed by Marcos Efron. Efron got the chance to direct the video through a competition run by Jewel's Soul City Cafe organization. The music video never aired in North America, though it was played in South America, Europe, Asia, and Australia.

== Track listing ==
=== Promotional US 5" CD single ===
1. This Way (Radio Remix) – 4:08
2. This Way (Album Version) – 4:16

== Official versions ==
- Album Version – 4:16
- Radio Remix – 4:08

== Chart positions ==
Chart (2001)	Peak position
US Adult Pop Airplay (Billboard)	36
