= Break Me =

Single by Jewel

from the album This Way
- Released: January 27, 2002
- Recorded: 2001
- Genre: Pop
- Length: 4:04 (Album Version); 3:58 (Radio Remix)
- Label: Atlantic
- Songwriter: Kilcher
- Producer: Atlantic

Jewel singles chronology
"Standing Still" (2001)	"Break Me" (2002)	"This Way" (2002)

"Break Me" is the second single by the singer Jewel, released from her 2001 album This Way. It was a minor hit on the New Zealand and Dutch singles chart, peaking at numbers 47 and 95, respectively. It reached number 28 on the Billboard Adult Top 40 chart in the U.S., and hit number 105 in the UK.

The video for the single, directed by Mike Lipscombe, featured special effects and was based on the war on terror in Afghanistan. It was played heavily on VH1 during the spring and summer of 2002.

Like the majority of Jewel's singles, "Break Me" was re-worked for radio release. The "Radio Remix" contained new vocals and arrangement.

== Chart positions ==
Chart (2001)	Peak position
Australia (ARIA)	112
Netherlands (Single Top 100)	95
New Zealand (Recorded Music NZ)	47
UK Singles (Official Charts Company)	103
US Adult Pop Airplay (Billboard)	28
