= It's About You =

- Theatrical release poster
- Directed by: Ian Markus; Kurt Markus
- Written by: Kurt Markus
- Starring: John Mellencamp
- Narrated by: Kurt Markus
- Production company: Little b Pictures
- Distributed by: MPI Media Group
- Release date: January 4, 2012
- Running time: 86 Minutes
- Country: United States
- Language: English

It's About You is a 2012 music documentary film directed by father and son duo Ian & Kurt Markus. The films focus regards John Mellencamp's 2009 tour with Bob Dylan and Willie Nelson, and the recording of his new album in the month and a half of the tour.

The film was shot entirely in the Super 8 format.

== Production ==
Prior to filming, Kurt Markus and Mellencamp had been friends for twenty years. The two had shared a vision of the decline of small-town American life, shown when the tour drives through towns like Littlefield, Texas. Neither Kurt Markus, Ian Markus, Willie Nelson, or Bob Dylan appear on screen; there is no interview with Mellencamp.

Kurt Markus, who narrates the film, summed up the film:

I think the music really isn’t about me. Yes I’m the filter, I tried to provide a context to really listen to John’s music. In that sense I’m the background and John is the heart and soul of it with his music.

== Release ==
The film premiered on March 12, 2011 at the South by Southwest film festival. It released in theatres on 4 January 2012.

== Critical reception ==
The film opened to mixed-to-positive reviews from critics. It has a current 'rotten' rating of 57% on Rotten Tomatoes. On Metacritic, the film has a rating of 55 based on 11 critic reviews, indicating mixed or average reviews.
