= Lester Mendez =

Cuban musician, composer, and producer

- Origin: Havana, Cuba
- Occupations: Producer; songwriter; composer; arranger; audio engineer
- Instruments: Piano; keyboards; synthesizers; modular synthesizers; drums; programming; percussion

Lester Mendez is a multi-platinum, Grammy Award-winning record producer, songwriter and composer. His production/writing credits include a multitude of successful hits with Shakira, Jewel, Nelly Furtado, Jessica Simpson, Enrique Iglesias, and others.

== Career ==
Starting out professionally as a session musician and programmer, he worked on a variety of music and genres, including Hip hop, Miami bass, Freestyle music, House music / Deep house, World music, Pop music and Latin pop. Mendez's keyboard, programming, arranging, and remixing credits include artists such as: Jimmy Page, David Coverdale, David Byrne, Spice Girls, Pet Shop Boys, Grace Jones, PM Dawn, Bee Gees, Jennifer Lopez, Ricky Martin, Babyface, Martika, Chris de Burgh, Johnny Mathis, Will Smith, Collective Soul, Angélique Kidjo, Byron Stingily, Exposé, Paris by Air, Gloria Estefan, Chynna Phillips, Regina Belle, Gerald Alston, Phyllis Hyman, Jaydee, Haddaway, Deep Forest, Lonnie Gordon, Cerrone, Jimmy "Bo" Horne, Murk (band), Funky Green Dogs, Qkumba Zoo, Wubble-U, Nuclear Valdez, Afro-Rican, Lulu, the seminal freestyle band Will To Power (band), and many others.

His early production / songwriting career saw him working with Chris Blackwell's Island Records artists Grace Jones, Angélique Kidjo, Baaba Maal, Dominican-born rapper Mangu (rapper), and others.

As his career continued to grow as a producer & songwriter, he went on to work with a number of artists, including: Carlos Santana, Jason Mraz, Josh Groban, Dido, Sia, Nelly Furtado, Shakira, Seal, Donna Summer, Anastacia, Ricky Martin, Enrique Iglesias, Sean Paul, Jem, Kerli, Oh land, Ladyhawke, Mike Posner, Sam Sparro, Mr Little Jeans, Adam Lambert, PlayRadioPlay!, Tarkan, Mark Feehily, Skylar Stecker, Rittz, She Is We, Leigh Nash and others. Most recently, he founded a project called Gemini Rising, in which he writes and produces all the music. Fellow collaborators on the project are Fiora (musician) and Tensnake. He also produced and co-wrote all 10 songs on the debut album by Claude Fontaine, a project he co-developed and co-conceived with Claude. The album was released on Innovative Leisure Records in the spring of 2019. In 2024, Claude Fontaine released her follow up to her debut, entitled "La Mer" on Innovative Leisure Records. It was entirely produced, arranged and co-written by him. Also in 2024, he co-wrote on Niko Rubio's "Mar y Tierra" EP, and produced and arranged the entire EP. In 2025, he continues his work with Niko Rubio, producing and co-writing the singles "Ring, Ring" and "Quisiera Saber".

== Awards ==
Award	Year	Category	Work	Result	Ref(s)
Grammy Awards	2006	Best Latin Rock or Alternative Album	Fijación Oral, Vol. 1	Won	
Latin Grammy Awards	2006	Album of the Year	Fijación Oral, Vol. 1	Won	
Latin Grammy Awards	2006	Best Female Pop Vocal Album	Fijación Oral, Vol. 1	Won	
Latin Grammy Awards	2006	Record of the Year	"La Tortura"	Won	
Latin Grammy Awards	2011	Album of the Year	Sale el Sol	Nominated	

== Discography (select) ==
Artist	Song	Album	Producer	Co-Writer
Niko Rubio	dream	Late Night Swim	×	x
Niko Rubio	tokyo	Late Night Swim	×	x
Niko Rubio	Mine	Sunday Girl EP	×	
Niko Rubio	Savior Complex	Sunday Girl EP	×	
Niko Rubio	Pink Starburst	Sunday Girl EP	×	
Niko Rubio	Baby	Ring Ring EP	×	×
Niko Rubio	No Lo Volvere Hacer	Ring Ring EP	×	
Niko Rubio	Quisiera Saber	Ring Ring EP	×	×
Niko Rubio	Ring Ring	Ring Ring EP	×	×
Claude Fontaine	Vaqueiro	La Mer	×	×
Claude Fontaine	Love The Way You Love	La Mer	×	×
Claude Fontaine	Green Ivy Tapestry	La Mer	×	×
Claude Fontaine	Laissez-Moi L'aimer	La Mer	×	×
Claude Fontaine	Concho Do Mar	La Mer	×	×
Claude Fontaine	Lovers Vow	La Mer	×	×
Claude Fontaine	Camacari	La Mer	×	×
Claude Fontaine	Small Hours	La Mer	×	×
Claude Fontaine	Reliquia	La Mer	×	×
Claude Fontaine	Marmalade Haze	La Mer	×	×
Claude Fontaine	Kissing The Sun	La Mer	×	×
Claude Fontaine	Chuva De Verao	La Mer	×	×
Niko Rubio	Feliz Por Conocerte	Mar y Tierra EP	×	
Niko Rubio	30 Mil Pies	Mar y Tierra EP	×	×
Niko Rubio	Sirena (feat. Cuco)	Mar y Tierra EP	×	×
Niko Rubio	Besito	Mar y Tierra EP	×	×
Loyal Lobos	Una Bitch	Single	Co-Producer	
Loyal Lobos	Pienso En Ti	Single	Co-Producer	
Loyal Lobos	Si Tu No Esta Aqui	Single	Co-Producer	
Haley Reinhart	Off The Ground	Off The Ground - Single		×
Tensnake	Nightshift (feat. Fiora)	L.A.	Co-Producer	×
Coco Morier	After Hours	After Hours - Single	×	×
Gemini Rising	Best Case Life	Best Case Life	×	×
Gemini Rising	Speed Of Sound	Best Case Life	×	×
Gemini Rising	Sunrise Boulevard	Best Case Life	×	×
Gemini Rising	Just Because	Best Case Life	×	×
Gemini Rising	After The Rain	Best Case Life	×	×
Gemini Rising	Orbit	Best Case Life	×	×
Gemini Rising	Morph	Best Case Life	×	×
Gemini Rising	Stars Come To An End	Best Case Life	×	×
Gemini Rising	Close Enough To Breathe	Best Case Life	×	×
Gemini Rising	The Future	Best Case Life	×	×
Gemini Rising	Tangy	Best Case Life	×	×
Gemini Rising	Nightsky	Best Case Life	×	×
Gemini Rising	Let It Go By	Best Case Life	×	×
Claude Fontaine	Cry For Another	Claude Fontaine	×	×
Claude Fontaine	Hot Tears	Claude Fontaine	×	×
Claude Fontaine	Little Sister	Claude Fontaine	×	×
Claude Fontaine	Love Street	Claude Fontaine	×	×
Claude Fontaine	Play By Play	Claude Fontaine	×	×
Claude Fontaine	Pretending He Was You	Claude Fontaine	×	×
Claude Fontaine	I'll Play The Fool	Claude Fontaine	×	×
Claude Fontaine	Strings Of Your Guitar	Claude Fontaine	×	×
Claude Fontaine	Footprints In The Sand	Claude Fontaine	×	×
Claude Fontaine	Our Last Goodbye	Claude Fontaine	×	×
Josh Groban	Musica Del Corazon	Bridges	×	×
Delhia De France	Waterfalls	Moirai EP	Co-Producer	×
Tensnake	Hello?	Hello - Single	Co-Producer	×
Gemini Rising	Best Case Life	Gemini Rising-EP	×	×
Gemini Rising	Sunrise Boulevard	Gemini Rising-EP	×	×
Gemini Rising	Stellaris	Gemini Rising-EP	×	×
Gemini Rising	Better Days	Gemini Rising-EP	×	×
Svala	Paper	Eurovision Song Contest 2017	×	×
Skylar Stecker	Everlasting	This is me	×	×
Kerli	Feral Hearts	Deepest Roots	×	×
Kerli	Walking on Air	Love is Dead	×	×
Kerli	Hurt Me	Love is Dead	×	×
She is We	Blue	War	×	×
Marcus Feehily	Find My Way	Fire	×	×
Coco Morier	No Pressure	Dreamer	×	×
Coco Morier	Dreamer	Dreamer	×	×
Coco Morier	World on Fire	Dreamer	×	×
Coco Morier	No Stranger(To Love)	Dreamer	×	×
Coco Morier	Walking In Our Sleep	Dreamer	×	×
Coco Morier	All Cats Are Grey	Dreamer	×	×
Coco Morier	Blood Moon	Dreamer	×	×
Dido	Stoned	Life For Rent		×
Dido	Just Say Yes	Girl Who Got Away		×
Santana	Saideira feat. Samuel Rosa	Corazón	×	
Santana	La Flaca feat. Juanes	Corazón	×	
Santana	Mal Bicho feat. Los Fabulosos Cadillacs	Corazón	×	
Santana	Iron Lion Zion feat. Ziggy Marley & ChocQuibTown	Corazón	×	
Santana	Una Noche en Nápoles feat. Lila Downs, Niña Pastori & Soledad	Corazón	×	
Santana	Margarita feat. Romeo Santos	Corazón	×	
Santana	Feel It Coming Back feat. Diego Torres	Corazón	×	
Santana	Amor Correspondido feat. Diego Torres	Corazón	×	
Santana	Cry Baby Cry feat. Joss Stone & Sean Paul	All That I Am	×	×
Santana	Brown Skin Girl feat. Bo Bice	All That I Am	×	
Santana	I Am Somebody feat. Will.I.AM	All That I Am	×	
Santana	Amore (Sexo) feat. Macy Gray	Shaman	×	×
Santana	Satellite feat. Marc Anthony	Shaman	×	×
Santana	Why Don't You & I feat. Chad Kroeger	Shaman	×	
Santana	You Are My Kind feat. Seal	Shaman	×	
Shakira	Antes De Las Seis	Sale El Sol	×	×
Shakira	Lo Que Más	Sale El Sol	×	
Shakira	Illegal feat. Carlos Santana	Oral Fixation, Vol.2	×	×
Shakira	Don't Bother	Oral Fixation, Vol.2	×	
Shakira	How Do You Do	Oral Fixation, Vol.2	×	
Shakira	Dreams For Plans	Oral Fixation, Vol.2	×	
Shakira	Your Embrace	Oral Fixation, Vol.2	×	
Shakira	Costume For A Clown	Oral Fixation, Vol.2	×	
Shakira	Timor	Oral Fixation, Vol.2	×	
Shakira	La Tortura feat Alejandro Sanz	Fijación Oral, Vol.1	×	
Shakira	La Pared	Fijación Oral, Vol.1	×	×
Shakira	No feat Gustavo Cerati	Fijación Oral, Vol.1	×	×
Shakira	Obtener Un Si	Fijación Oral, Vol.1	×	×
Shakira	Escondite Inglés	Fijación Oral, Vol.1	×	
Shakira	Las de la Intuición	Fijación Oral, Vol.1	×	
Shakira	Dia De Enero	Fijación Oral, Vol.1	×	
Shakira	Lo Imprescindible	Fijación Oral, Vol.1	×	×
Shakira	Underneath Your Clothes	Laundry Service	×	×
Shakira	Objection (Tango)	Laundry Service	×	×
Shakira	Rules	Laundry Service	×	×
Shakira	Ready For The Good Times	Laundry Service	×	×
Shakira	The One	Laundry Service	×	
Shakira	Fool	Laundry Service	×	
Shakira	Te Dejo Madrid	Laundry Service	×	
Shakira	Octavo Día	Dónde Están los Ladrones?	×	×
Shakira	Ciega, Sordomuda	Dónde Están los Ladrones?	×	
Shakira	Tú	Dónde Están los Ladrones?	×	
Shakira	Moscas En La Casa	Dónde Están los Ladrones?	×	
Shakira	Que Vuelvas	Dónde Están los Ladrones?	×	
Sean Paul	Cry Baby Cry feat. Joss Stone & Sean Paul	The Trinity	×	×
Nelly Furtado	Más	Mi Plan	×	×
Nelly Furtado	Como Lluvia feat. Juan Luis Guerra	Mi Plan	×	×
Nelly Furtado	Silencio feat. Josh Groban	Mi Plan	×	×
Nelly Furtado	Vacación	Mi Plan	×	×
Nelly Furtado	Te Busqué feat. Juanes	Loose	×	×
Nelly Furtado	Undercover	Loose	×	×
Nelly Furtado	What I Wanted	Loose	×	×
Nelly Furtado	For Sure	Loose	×	×
Nelly Furtado	Stars	The Best of Nelly Furtado	×	×
Enrique Iglesias	Sad Eyes	Enrique	×	
Enrique Iglesias	"Quizás" (Enrique Iglesias song)	Quizás	×	×
Enrique Iglesias	Para Qué la Vida	Quizás	×	×
Enrique Iglesias	Mentiroso	Quizás	×	
Josh Groban	Un Alma Mas feat Arturo Sandoval	All That Echoes	×	×
Josh Groban	E Ti Prometerro feat Laura Pausini	All That Echoes	×	×
Josh Groban	False Alarms	All That Echoes		×
Josh Groban	Voce Existe Em Mi	Illuminations		×
Sam Sparro	Return To Paradise	Return To Paradise	×	×
Adam Lambert	Broken English	Trespassing	×	×
Adam Lambert	Shady feat Nile Rodgers & Sam Sparro	Trespassing	×	×
Donna Summer	Be Myself Again	Crayons	×	×
PlayRadioPlay!	Loco Motion	Texas	×	
PlayRadioPlay!	Madi	Texas	×	
PlayRadioPlay!	Pirate & Princess	Texas	×	
PlayRadioPlay!	See U Soon	Texas	×	
PlayRadioPlay!	Tooth Decay	Texas	×	
PlayRadioPlay!	Attendance	Texas	×	
PlayRadioPlay!	Texas	Texas	×	
Jason Mraz	Mr.Curiosity	Mr. A–Z		×
Madi Diaz	Ghost Rider	Phantom	×	×
Jewel	Forever and a Day (Always)	Lullaby		×
Jewel	Drive To You	Goodbye Alice In Wonderland		×
Jewel	Stand	0304	×	×
Jewel	Run 2 U	0304	×	×
Jewel	Intuition	0304	×	×
Jewel	Leave The Lights On	0304	×	×
Jewel	2 Find You	0304	×	×
Jewel	Fragile Heart	0304	×	
Jewel	Doin' Fine	0304	×	×
Jewel	2 Become 1	0304	×	
Jewel	Haunted	0304	×	×
Jewel	Sweet Temptation	0304	×	
Jewel	Yes U Can	0304	×	
Jewel	U & Me=Love	0304	×	×
Jewel	America	0304	×	×
Jewel	Becoming	0304	×	×
Rittz	Switch Lanes feat Mike Posner	The Life and Times of Jonny Valiant	×	×
Oh land	Helicopter	Oh land	×	×
Ladyhawke	Human	Anxiety		×
Mr Little Jeans	Back To You	Pocketknife	×	×
Mr Little Jeans	Far From Home	Pocketknife	×	×
Katie Noonan	Sweet One feat. Sia	Emperor's Box		×
Lamya	Black Mona Lisa - Single Mix	Learning from Falling	×	
Anastacia	You'll Be Fine	Heavy Rotation	×	×
Anastacia	Naughty	Heavy Rotation	×	×
Anastacia	Same Song	Heavy Rotation	×	
Anastacia	All Fall Down	Heavy Rotation	×	
Anastacia	The Way I See It	Heavy Rotation	×	
Wyclef Jean	Three Nights In Rio feat. Carlos Santana	The Preacher's Son	×	
Mýa	Do You Only Want To Dance	Dirty Dancing : Havana Nights	×	×
Jem	It's Amazing	Down To Earth	×	×
Jem	I Want You To	Down To Earth	×	×
Jem	I Always Knew	Down To Earth	×	×
Jem	On Top OF The World	Down To Earth	×	×
Jem	Once in Every Lifetime	Eragon	×	×
Jeffree Star	Get Physical	Beauty Killer	×	×
Jeffree Star	Gorgeous	Beauty Killer	×	×
Jeffree Star	Kiss it Better	Single	×	×
Jessica Simpson	A Public Affair	A Public Affair	×	×
Jessica Simpson	The Lover In Me	A Public Affair	×	
Jessica Simpson	Let Him Fly	A Public Affair	×	
Paulina Rubio	Algo De Ti	Gran City Pop	×	
Paulina Rubio	A Contra Luz	Gran City Pop	×	
Paulina Rubio	Escaleras De Arena	Gran City Pop	×	
Angelique Kidjo	Fifa	Fifa		×
Angelique Kidjo	Akwaba	Fifa		×
Baaba Maal	Yele ( Hamady Bogle)	Single	×	
