= Goodbye Alice in Wonderland =

Studio album by Jewel
- Released: May 2, 2006
- Recorded: El Dorado Studios (Burbank, California); Ocean Way Recording and Capitol Studios (Hollywood, California)
- Genres: Pop; pop rock; folk; folk rock
- Length: 54:36
- Labels: Atlantic; Warner Bros.
- Producers: Rob Cavallo; Jewel

Jewel chronology
0304 (2003)	Goodbye Alice in Wonderland (2006)	Perfectly Clear (2008)

Singles from Goodbye Alice in Wonderland
- 1. "Again and Again" Released: February 1, 2006; 2. "Good Day" Released: July 31, 2006; 3. "Only One Too" Released: January 2, 2007

Goodbye Alice in Wonderland is the sixth studio album by singer-songwriter Jewel, released on May 2, 2006, through Atlantic Records. The album marks a return to her musical roots after 0304, and trying to write an autobiographical album like she did with Pieces of You. The album was written in the form of a novel with each track representing a chapter. Singles released from the album were "Again and Again", "Good Day", and "Stephenville, TX".

The album made its debut at No. 8 on the Billboard 200, with sales of 82,000 copies its first week, and became Jewel's fifth top 10 album in the United States. It has sold 377,000 copies in the U.S. as of June 2010.

== Background ==
After exploring dance-pop on 2003's 0304, Jewel made a return to form with "Goodbye Alice in Wonderland". Jewel said the album was "the most autobiographical album" she made since Pieces of You. Each song was recorded as a live performance, with only percussion overdubbed.

Atlantic Records opted not to renew her contract at the end of 2006, and Goodbye Alice in Wonderland would be her final album of new material with them.

=== Songs ===
"It tells the story of my life from Alaska to being homeless to that little bottle that said 'Drink me,' which was my career,".

— Jewel says about the album.

The first song and lead single "Again and Again" is a "slick, radio-ready ditty as vacuous as it is catchy", according to Slant's Preston Jones. "Long Slow Slide" shows a sensitive folkie side. "Growing up is not an absence of dreaming," she states on the title track "Goodbye Alice in Wonderland". Slant's Preston Jones wrote that it "feels naggingly familiar, as though Jewel mined her back catalog to rework a lesser-known song." The fourth track and second single "Good Day" opens with her standing in front of her fridge at midnight, drawling: "I might make a wish – if I believed in that shit." On the fifth track "Satellite", written when she was 18, she notes that "the Pope," "rock and roll," "Valium," even "Miss Cleo" can't fix her broken heart.

The sixth track "Only One Too" was released as the third single of the album and a remixes EP was released on October 10, 2006, featuring 5 remixes. "Fragile Heart" is originally featured on 0304. While the musical arrangement was more pop oriented in the original release, the new version leans more folk.

== Critical reception ==
Professional ratings
Aggregate scores
Source	Rating
Metacritic	(57/100)
Review scores
Source	Rating
Allmusic	4.5/5 stars
Amazon.com	(favorable)
Entertainment Weekly	B
The Guardian	3/5 stars
The Observer	3/5 stars
Paste Magazine	2.5/5 stars
Rolling Stone	2/5 stars
Slant Magazine	2/5 stars
Stylus Magazine	C

At Metacritic, which assigns a normalized rating out of 100 given to reviews from mainstream critics, the album received an average score of 57, based on 18 reviews, which indicates "mixed or average reviews". Allmusic's editor Stephen Thomas Erlewine gave to the album 4.5 out of 5 stars, writing that the album "may have an entirely different feel and intent than its glitzy predecessor, but like 0304 (2003), it is proof that even if Jewel doesn't have as high a profile, or perhaps as large an audience, as she did in 1996, she's a better songwriter and record-maker than she was at the outset of her career." Gordon Agar from Observer Music Monthly wrote that the producer Rob Cavallo added "a colourful Lilith to Jewel's often shrill soprano" and called the album "lovely." While Caroline Sullivan from The Guardian called the album "A surprisingly substantial return." Kathleen C. Fennessy from Amazon wrote that "maturity has granted Jewel, now in her early 30s, greater perspective and a sense of humor missing from her more earnest early work."

Catie James from Blogcritics wrote a mixed review, writing that "the problem with Alice is a case of the music overwhelming the lyrics in most of the album’s songs." Edd Hurt from Paste Magazine gave to the album 2.5 out of 5 stars, stating that "Jewel never appears to be going through the motions—her grasp of pop form is as compelling as her voice, which shades from callow to knowing to heroic with her unique, troubled aplomb." In contrast, Ayo Jegede from Stylus Magazine wrote "we find Jewel going through the motions rather than providing us with a noteworthy movement and in the end these songs here are less artistic pronouncements and more the conclusion of a specific product line." Preston Jones from Slant Magazine wrote "while Goodbye Alice In Wonderland is a return to form for Jewel, said form is bland, mostly colorless, and devoid of any truly memorable cuts." Christian Hoard from Rolling Stone wrote "it might keep Jewel on the charts, but its bright come-ons sound both overdone and undercooked."

== Commercial performance ==
Goodbye Alice in Wonderland debuted at number eight on the Billboard 200 with first-week sales of 82,000 copies, continuing a string of top ten releases, only broken by her ninth studio album Sweet and Wild (2010). It has sold 377,000 copies in the U.S. as of June 2010.

== Track listing ==
All tracks are written by Jewel Kilcher, with co-writers as noted.

No.	Title	Writer(s)	Length
1.	"Again and Again"	John Shanks	3:57
2.	"Long Slow Slide"		3:48
3.	"Goodbye Alice in Wonderland"		5:55
4.	"Good Day"	Greg Wells; Kara DioGuardi	3:46
5.	"Satellite"		5:05
6.	"Only One Too"	John Shanks	3:04
7.	"Words Get in the Way"		3:58
8.	"Drive to You"	Lester Mendez	4:14
9.	"Last Dance Rodeo"		6:16
10.	"Fragile Heart"	Anthony Bell	3:21
11.	"Stephenville, TX"		3:56
12.	"Where You Are"		3:28
13.	"1000 Miles Away"		3:48
Total length:			54:36

iTunes bonus tracks

14. "1000 Miles Away" (acoustic live) – 3:45
15. "Interview" – 3:29

Bonus tracks

14. "Satellite" (live acoustic version) – available with iTunes pre-order
15. "1000 Miles Away" (live acoustic version) – available on UK iTunes when full album is purchased

International bonus tracks

16. "A Long Slow Slide" (acoustic version)
17. "Foolish Games" (live)

=== Two-disc set ===
A two-disc set of the album was released by Target Corporation which included a DVD.

DVD track listing:

1. The Making of the "Again and Again" Video
2. The Making of the Album
3. "Goodbye Alice in Wonderland" video

== Personnel ==
- Jewel – all vocals, acoustic guitar
- Jamie Muhoberac – keyboards, acoustic piano
- Tim Pierce – guitars
- Greg Suran – guitars
- Rob Cavallo – additional guitars
- Paul Bushnell – bass
- John Pierce – additional bass
- Dorian Crozier – drums, programming
- Luis Conte – percussion
- David Campbell – horn arrangements (3, 4, 9), string arrangements (3, 4)

=== Production ===
- Rob Cavallo – producer
- Jewel – producer
- Doug McKean – recording
- Dan Chase – additional engineer
- Allen Sides – additional engineer (3, 4, 9)
- Greg Burns – second engineer
- Brian Cometa – second engineer
- Jimmy Hoyson – second engineer
- Chris Steffan – second engineer
- Brian Vibberts – second engineer
- Chris Lord-Alge – mixing at Resonate Music (Burbank, California)
- Keith Armstrong – second mix engineer
- Dmtar Krnjaic – second mix engineer
- Matt Beckley – additional Pro Tools
- Ted Jensen – mastering at Sterling Sound (New York, NY)
- Cheryl Jenets – production coordinator
- Sara Cumings – art direction, design
- Jeri Heiden – art direction, design, additional photography
- Kurt Markus – photography
- Irving Azoff – management

== Charts ==
=== Album ===
Chart (2006)	Peak position
Australian Albums (ARIA)	17
Dutch Albums (Album Top 100)	33
Japan Oricon Albums Chart	58
Italian Albums Chart	94
New Zealand RIANZ Albums Chart	36
Swedish Albums Chart	42
Swiss Albums Chart	34
UK Albums Chart	114
US Billboard 200	8
US Top Rock Albums (Billboard)	4

=== Singles ===
Year	Single	Chart	Peak position
2006	"Again and Again"	Australian Singles Chart	38
2006	"Again and Again"	US Adult Contemporary	37
2006	"Again and Again"	US Adult Top 40	16
2006	"Again and Again"	US Billboard Hot 100	80
2006	"Again and Again"	US Pop 100	61
2006	"Good Day"	US Adult Top 40	30
2007	"Only One Too"	US Adult Top 40	34
2007	"Only One Too"	US Hot Dance Club Play	12

== Certifications ==
Region	Certification	Certified units/sales
United States	—	377,000
