= Wolf & I =

Single by Oh Land

from the album Oh Land
- Released: 13 March 2011
- Recorded: 2010
- Studio: Mr. Dan's (Streatham)
- Genre: Trip hop; R&B
- Length: 4:37
- Label: RCA
- Songwriter(s): Nanna Øland Fabricius; Owen Beverly
- Producer(s): Dan Carey

Oh Land singles chronology
"Sun of a Gun" (2010)	"Wolf & I" (2011)	"Voodoo" (2011)

"Wolf & I" is a song recorded by Danish recording artist Oh Land, taken from her self-titled second studio album Oh Land (2011). It was released as the album's second single on 13 March 2011 by RCA Records, with the recording being issued as a CD single, featuring two other singles from the eponymous album. The song is a trip hop and R&B composition that serves as an "introductory single" for her career. The track was written by Nanna Øland Fabricius and Owen Beverly, with Dan Carey solely producing it.

The single received generally favourable reviews from music critics, who called it one of the highlights on the parent album. Other critics found it to be "dreamy" and "sweet". Commercially, "Wolf & I" did not peak on any record chart. A music video was not filmed for the single, but a live video of Oh Land performing the song was released onto her official YouTube account on 20 October 2010 in support of her album. Another rendition of the single was sung live at Heaven in London, and received positive feedback from reviewers.

== Background and composition ==
"Wolf & I" is a trip hop and R&B song that lasts four minutes and thirty-seven seconds. Written by Nanna Øland Fabricius and Owen Beverly, Dan Carey served as the song's executive producer. Lyrically, "Wolf & I" compares finding love to a wolf pack. John Calvert, writing for Drowned in Sound, stated that "it's the type of erotic fairytale Flo Welch would sell her kneecaps for". Furthermore, Calvert claimed that "the sexy beast is [...] a sneaky diversion from [the] album". Along the same line, a critic from Billboard thought that it belonged on the soundtrack for True Blood. The single was released as a CD single on 13 March 2011 in the United States by Fake Diamond Records and RCA Records. It was intended to serve as an "introductory single" for Oh Land.

Sal Cinquemani from Slant Magazine compared "Wolf & I" to the work of Björk, and claimed it was influenced by the trip-hop genre. Along the same line, Fraser McAlpine from the BBC found similarities to the music of Welch and Katy B, calling it "part airy myth and part earthy bass throb". A reviewer for Mixtape Muse described the recording as "cinematic without losing its heart in the expansive sound", while Andrew Hannah from The Line of Best Fit labelled it as "a sultry R&B groove jam". Michael Jose Gonzalez, a writer for Gaffa, stated Oh Land was "not afraid to flirt with great drama", adding that she "adds melancholy gravity" to the track.

== Critical reception ==
"Wolf & I" received generally positive reviews from music critics. Calvert stated that "Wolf & I" created an "early promise" for Oh Land's image. However, in Calvert's review of the parent album, he considered it the only notable work on the effort, claiming it "continues to dazzle". Similarly, DeShaun Zollicoffer of GeekRevolt labelled it a "stand out track". Kieron Tyler of The Arts Desk called the recording a "sweet confection that ought to prove irresistible". A critic from Mixtape Muse applauded the single for "cast[ing] a dreamy atmosphere", in addition to it being "filled with a sense of discovery". The Line of Best Fit's Hannah opined that "Wolf & I" put the record "back on track" following album songs "Voodoo" and "Lean". Henrik Queitsch from Ekstra Bladet highlighted the track, claiming that the rest of the songs "do not reach the level" of "Wolf & I" and "Rainbow". In a mixed review, Cinquemani from Slant Magazine stated that "however well executive [it] may be, [it] end[s] up sounding derivative".

== Promotion ==
Unlike Oh Land's previous single, "Sun of a Gun", a music video was not created for "Wolf & I". However, a live performance of the track was uploaded onto Oh Land's official YouTube channel on 20 October 2010, in order to support the release of Oh Land. During the rendition, she performs in a dark room full of balloons, where she plays the keyboards along with a drummer. In addition, she sang the song live on several occasions, including in February 2012 at the Heaven nightclub in London. The blogger behind Alfitude.com applauded her appearance, stating that "she drove everyone wild with her tribal beats and cute Danish voice". Additionally, Tyler applauded Oh Land for "sh[ining]" during the act.

== Track listing ==
- US Promo CD
1. "Wolf & I" – 4:37
2. "White Nights" – 3:45
3. "White Nights (Twin Shadow Remix)" – 4:09
4. "Sun of a Gun" – 3:25
5. "Sun of a Gun (Yuksek Remix)" – 4:26
6. "Sun of a Gun (Savage Skulls Remix)" – 4:37

== Credits and personnel ==
Credits and personnel adapted from the liner notes of Oh Land.

Recording

- Recorded and mixed at Mr. Dan's Streathem (Streatham)

Personnel

- Nanna Øland Fabricius – vocals, lyrics, instruments
- Owen Beverly – lyrics
- Dan Carey – production, engineering
- Alexis Smith – mixing

== Release history ==
Release dates and formats for "Wolf & I"
Region	Date	Format	Label(s)	Ref.
United States	11 March 2011	CD	Fake Diamond; RCA	
