= Ten (song) =

Single by Jewel

from the album Sweet and Wild
- Released: September 13, 2010
- Studio: Aimeeland Studios (Brentwood, TN); The Jewel Box (Stephensville, TX); Pain in the Art Studios (Nashville, TN); Dogwood Studios (Nashville, TN)
- Genre: Country
- Length: 3:25
- Label: Valory Music Group
- Songwriters: Jewel, Dave Berg
- Producer: Nathan Chapman

Jewel singles chronology
| "Satisfied" (2010) | "Ten" (2010) | "Two Hearts Breaking" (2013) |

"Ten" is a song co-written and recorded by American recording artist Jewel. It was released in September 2010, and serves as the third single from her second country album, Sweet and Wild, which was released on June 8, 2010 via Valory Music Group.

== Background ==
Jewel said on her website that she wrote this song after an argument with her husband, nine-time world champion pro rodeo cowboy, Ty Murray. She explained: "I'm probably the only nerd that gets a chuckle from this, but what the heck. This is one of my favorite story lyrics. I wrote it after Ty and I got in a big fight one day. I was so mad; I had to count to ten before I totally lost it. Love is a peculiar thing - it can inspire the best and the worst feeling because we let someone in so close to us. But the reward is so great too, that always keeping that perspective is key, no matter how intense a fleeting fight can be. I wrote this song as a sort of 'count to ten' experience that can help ease you out of bad feelings, and even remind you to be thankful for their best qualities too. I like the opening line 'whoever said love is easy, must have never been in love' - I think everyone can relate!".

== Reception ==
Sara Henderson from AOL Music said: "With a twangy, guitar-plucking melody, Jewel admits love's journey is no easy task; despite occasional conflicts, she says sometimes the best resolution is to step back and reflect: "It's hard to see just what you have, when you're seeing red / And it's easy to do something that you know you both will regret / Better stop, think, count to ten before I leave." Entertainment Focus said that: "Ten is a close runner-up for favourite track as Jewel sings her way through an argument with a lover. As she counts to ten she’s forgotten what she was arguing about and highlights the often unnecessary conflict that can bog down a relationship".

== Music video ==
The music video was released in October 2010. It was directed by Peter Zavadil. It first shows Jewel in a bedroom with 2 beds. One is for her, and one is for her ex. Later on, she has a dream that she is in a boxing match, with a big red heart with hands as her co-player, and a very strict black coach. In the end, the heart and Jewel hug, and it goes back to the bedroom, where her ex makes up with her, and becomes her friend again. The bedroom scenes are in color, while the boxing scenes are in black-and-white.

== Chart performance ==
The single debuted at number 59 in September, and peaked at number 51 in its third chart week.

| Chart (2010) | Peak Position |
|---|---|
| US Hot Country Songs (Billboard) | 51 |
