= Stand (Jewel song) =

2003 single by Jewel

- US and European CD single cover

Single by Jewel

from the album 0304
- B-side: "Leave the Lights On"
- Released: September 2, 2003
- Studio: Conway (Hollywood, California)
- Length: 3:15
- Label: Atlantic
- Songwriters: Jewel Kilcher; Lester Mendez
- Producers: Lester Mendez; Jewel Kilcher

Jewel singles chronology
| "Intuition" (2003) | "Stand" (2003) | "2 Become 1" (2003) |

"Stand" is a song by American singer Jewel from her fifth studio album, 0304 (2003). Written and produced by Jewel and Lester Mendez, the song was released as the album's second single on September 2, 2003. "Stand" did not enter the Billboard Hot 100, instead reaching number 16 on the Billboard Hot 100 Singles Sales chart, while becoming Jewel's third consecutive number-one song on the Billboard Dance Club Play chart.

== Background and writing ==
"Stand" was written and produced by Kilcher and Lester Mendez.

== Critical reception ==
Todd Burns of Stylus Magazine wrote, "['Stand'] is a strong first song and while the lyrics are vaguely suspect, they can be ignored in favor of the driving beat."

== Commercial release ==
The single edit saw no alteration from its original version. However, it was listed as Single Mix on some promotional singles, which is no different from the album version.

"Stand" was released in two formats in the United States; the CD single contains "Stand" and the 0304 track "Leave the Lights On" as its B-side, while the CD maxi single contains the song's club mixes. Both singles contained two different covers. International releases of the single received the title track and a few club mixes for its final release.

== Music video ==
The music video for "Stand" was directed by Chris Applebaum. It shows Jewel and some of the events described throughout the song's lyrics.

== Track listings ==
- US CD single
1. "Stand" – 3:10
2. "Leave the Lights On" – 3:22
- US maxi-CD single
1. "Stand" (Markus Schulz club mix) – 6:49
2. "Stand" (Mike Rizzo remix) – 8:04
3. "Stand" (The Scumfrog extended re-hash) – 7:40
4. "Stand" (Boris & Beck club mix) – 6:29
5. "Stand" (Bastone & Burnz club mix) – 7:12
6. "Stand" (Markus Schulz Coldharbour mix) – 9:51
7. "Stand" (Bastone & Burnz Del Moody mix) – 5:24
8. "Stand" (Bastone & Burnz Drum N Bass mix) – 5:35
- European CD single
1. "Stand" (album version)
2. "Stand" (The Scumfrog Extended re-hash mix)
- Australian CD single
1. "Stand" (album version)
2. "Stand" (Markus Schulz club mix)
3. "Stand" (The Scumfrog Extended re-hash mix)

== Charts ==
| Chart (2003–2004) | Peak position |
|---|---|
| Australia (ARIA) | 21 |
| Netherlands (Dutch Top 40 Tipparade) | 4 |
| Netherlands (Single Top 100) | 71 |
| US Hot Singles Sales (Billboard) | 16 |
| US Adult Pop Airplay (Billboard) | 37 |
| US Dance Club Songs (Billboard) | 1 |

== Release history ==
| Region | Date | Format(s) | Label(s) | Ref. |
|---|---|---|---|---|
| United States | September 2, 2003 | Contemporary hit; hot adult contemporary radio | Atlantic | |
| Australia | October 27, 2003 | CD | Atlantic | |

== See also ==
- List of number-one dance singles of 2003 (U.S.)
