= 0304 =

2003 studio album by Jewel

Studio album by Jewel
- Released: June 3, 2003
- Studio: Conway (Hollywood, California)
- Genre: Dance-pop; electronic pop
- Length: 53:25
- Label: Atlantic
- Producer: Lester A. Mendez; Jewel Kilcher

Jewel chronology
This Way (2001)	0304 (2003)	Goodbye Alice in Wonderland (2006)

Alternative cover
- European cover

Singles from 0304
- 1. "Intuition" Released: April 7, 2003; 2. "Stand" Released: September 2, 2003; 3. "2 Become 1" Released: December 16, 2003

0304 is the fifth studio album by American singer Jewel, released on June 3, 2003, by Atlantic Records. Inspired by Jewel's sudden success topping the US Billboard Hot Dance Club Play chart in early November 2002 with a remix of "Serve the Ego", the final single from her previous album This Way, the album is a radical departure from her previous folk-oriented musical efforts and is instead more pop and dance-focused.

0304 produced three singles. The lead single "Intuition", a top 20 hit on the US Billboard Hot 100, topped the Dance Club Songs chart, as did the album's second single "Stand". Its third single, "2 Become 1", was less successful, peaking at 33 on the Adult Top 40 chart.

== Background ==
Within the booklet to 0304, Jewel includes a note to her fans, explaining, "This record may seem different to you. To me, it's closer to what has been in my head for years. I wanted to make a record that was a modern interpretation of big band music. A record that was lyric-driven, like Cole Porter stuff, that also had a lot of swing. And a lot of it is thanks to Lester (Mendez), because when I told him I wanted to make a record that combined dance, urban, and folk music, he didn't look at me like I was crazy. I loved making this record, and it's the first record I enjoy listening to. It's fun! I hope you all love it. I hope it makes you feel young and sexy and smart." For the album, Jewel teamed with producers Lester Mendez (Shakira, Enrique Iglesias) and Rick Nowels (Madonna).

== Critical reception ==
Professional ratings
Aggregate scores
Source	Rating
Metacritic	63/100
Review scores
Source	Rating
About.com	4/5 stars
AllMusic	4.5/5 stars
Blender	3/5 stars
Entertainment Weekly	B−
The Guardian	2/5 stars
Q	3.5/5 stars
Rolling Stone	3/5 stars
Slant Magazine	3.5/5 stars
Stylus Magazine	C
Uncut	4/5 stars

0304 received generally positive reviews from music critics. At Metacritic, which assigns a normalized rating out of 100 to reviews from mainstream publications, the album received an average score of 63, based on nine reviews. Stephen Thomas Erlewine from AllMusic stated that "it's the first album of hers that's a sheer pleasure to hear", while noting that "[she] includes a note to her fans, explaining, 'This album may seem different to you,' which is putting it mildly", to convey the surprising, yet pleasing modern sound, and that "she puts herself out on the line more than she ever has, and she's come up with her best record, with her best set of songs and best music yet." Ron Slomowicz from About.com declared that "the album is balanced by dance pop that you would expect to hear on a Britney album." Sal Cinquemani from Slant Magazine was also positive, writing that "the album is more pop than electronica, but it also presents one of the most startling—yet oddly fitting—transformations in pop history" and also comparing the album to Madonna's Ray of Light (1998) and American Life (2003). Barry Walters from Rolling Stone agreed with Cinquemani, describing the album as "essentially a wanna-be version of Madonna's American Life" and noting that "she's found herself an artificial flavor that tastes good." A positive review also came from Uncut, who wrote that "the tunes are stunning, her voice has never sounded better and she makes serious points few others would dare in a pop context." Brian Hiatt from Entertainment Weekly opined that the "unexpected dance-pop vibrancy makes it Jewel's best album."

The album also received some mixed reviews, with some critics criticizing the change of style adopted on the album. Alexis Petridis from The Guardian wrote, "Like Robbie Williams's Escapology, 0304 virtually knocks itself out in its attempts to win over the US public", while commenting that she looks "desperate" and "uncomfortable" on the album. Darryl Sterdan from Jam! said that the album "isn't going to save her soul—or anyone else's." Caroline Bansal from musicOMH described the album as "an enjoyable 54 minutes of pop, full of catchy, chirpy songs, proving Jewel's ear candy as well as eye candy credentials. The album could be the soundtrack of a summer's day at the beach, or for getting ready for a girly night out."

== Commercial performance ==
0304 became the highest-debuting album of Jewel's career, entering the Billboard 200 at number two (behind Metallica's St. Anger) with 144,000 copies sold in its first week. It earned a gold certification from Recording Industry Association of America (RIAA) on July 14, 2003, one month and 11 days after its release, and had sold over 771,000 copies in the United States as of June 2010.

== Track listing ==
All lyrics are written by Jewel Kilcher; all music is composed by Kilcher and Lester Mendez, except where noted.

No.	Title	Music	Length
1.	"Stand"		3:13
2.	"Run 2 U"		3:38
3.	"Intuition"		3:49
4.	"Leave the Lights On"		3:22
5.	"2 Find U"		3:16
6.	"Fragile Heart"	Kilcher; Anthony Bell	3:33
7.	"Doin' Fine"		3:14
8.	"2 Become 1"	Kilcher; Guy Chambers	4:40
9.	"Haunted"		4:52
10.	"Sweet Temptation"	Kilcher; Rick Nowels	4:09
11.	"Yes U Can"	Kilcher; Nowels	4:01
12.	"U & Me = Love"		3:36
13.	"America"		3:40
14.	"Becoming"		4:22

Australian and Japanese edition bonus track
No.	Title	Length
15.	"Intuition" (Ford's Radio Mix)	4:15

European edition bonus tracks
No.	Title	Length
15.	"Intuition" (Todd Terry In-House Mix)	5:41
16.	"Intuition" (video)

Australian Tour Edition bonus disc
No.	Title	Length
1.	"Intuition" (live from Sessions@AOL)	3:28
2.	"Standing Still" (live from Sessions@AOL)	4:05
3.	"Leave the Lights On" (live from Sessions@AOL)	3:22
4.	"Stand" (live from LAUNCH.com)	3:27
5.	"2 Become 1" (live from LAUNCH.com)	7:28
6.	"Intuition" (video – international version)
7.	"Stand" (video)

Notes

- The UK edition has the same cover art as that of the edition released in the rest of Europe but is otherwise identical to the main release.

== Personnel ==
Credits adapted from the liner notes of 0304.

=== Musicians ===
- Jewel – vocals
- Rusty Anderson – electric guitar
- David Levita – electric guitar (tracks 1, 2, 4–14)
- Mark Oakley – acoustic guitar
- Paul Bushnell – bass (tracks 1, 3–14)
- Lester A. Mendez – keyboards, arrangement (all tracks); claps (tracks 3, 11)
- Abe Laboriel Jr. – snare drum (tracks 1, 2); claps (tracks 3, 11); drums (tracks 4–14); percussion (tracks 4–8, 10–14)
- Mike Bolger – accordion (track 3); trumpet, trombone (track 4)
- Greg Collins – claps (tracks 3, 11)
- Patrick Warren – Chamberlin (tracks 4, 6, 9, 14); piano (track 8)
- Lisa Germano – violin, backing vocals (track 6)
- Havana Hustlers – programming

=== Technical ===
- Lester A. Mendez – production
- Jewel Kilcher – production
- Lenedra Carroll – executive production
- Ron Shapiro – executive production
- Evan Lamberg – executive production
- Greg Collins – engineering
- Clif Norrell – additional engineering
- Ryan Freeland – additional engineering
- Andrew Scheps – additional engineering
- Carlos Paucar – additional engineering
- John Morrical – engineering assistance
- Seth Waldmann – engineering assistance
- Serban Ghenea – mixing
- John Hanes – additional Pro Tools engineering
- Tim Roberts – mix engineering assistance
- Chris Gehringer – mastering
- Will Quinnell – mastering engineering assistance
- Becky Scott – production coordination

=== Artwork ===
- Richard Bates – art direction
- Greenberg Kingsley – design
- Peter Robathan – photography

== Charts ==
=== Weekly charts ===
Weekly chart performance for 0304
Chart (2003)	Peak position
Australian Albums (ARIA)	10
Austrian Albums (Ö3 Austria)	74
Canadian Albums (Billboard)	9
Dutch Albums (Album Top 100)	12
French Albums (SNEP)	141
German Albums (Offizielle Top 100)	33
New Zealand Albums (RMNZ)	16
Norwegian Albums (VG-lista)	39
Scottish Albums (OCC)	80
Swedish Albums (Sverigetopplistan)	56
Swiss Albums (Schweizer Hitparade)	45
UK Albums (OCC)	79
US Billboard 200	2

=== Year-end charts ===
Year-end chart performance for 0304
Chart (2003)	Position
US Billboard 200	110

== Certifications ==
Certifications for 0304
Region	Certification	Certified units/sales
Australia (ARIA)	Gold	35,000^{^}
Canada (Music Canada)	Gold	50,000^{^}
United States (RIAA)	Gold	771,000
^{^} Shipments figures based on certification alone.

== Release history ==
Release history for 0304
Region	Date	Edition	Label	Ref.
United States	June 3, 2003	Standard	Atlantic	
Japan	June 11, 2003	Standard	Warner	
Australia	June 23, 2003	Standard	Warner	
Germany	September 1, 2003	Standard	Warner	
United Kingdom	September 1, 2003	Standard	Atlantic	
Australia	February 9, 2004	Tour Edition	Warner	
