= Good Day (Jewel song) =

2006 single by Jewel

Single by Jewel

from the album Goodbye Alice in Wonderland
- Released: July 31, 2006
- Genre: Folk-pop
- Length: 3:44
- Label: Atlantic
- Songwriters: Jewel Kilcher; Kara DioGuardi; Greg Wells
- Producer: Greg Wells

Jewel singles chronology
"Again and Again" (2006)	"Good Day" (2006)	"Only One Two" (2007)

"Good Day" is a song by the American recording artist Jewel. It was released as the second single from her sixth studio album, Goodbye Alice in Wonderland. The song was written by Jewel, Kara DioGuardi and co-written and produced by Greg Wells.

== Background and composition ==
"Good Day" is a midtempo soft ballad, written by Kilcher, Kara DioGuardi and Greg Wells and produced by Wells. The song opens with her standing in front of her fridge at midnight, drawling: "I might make a wish – if I believed in that shit."

== Critical reception ==
Caroline Sullivan from The Guardian wrote that in the song "some of Jewel's twittery soul-searching has been replaced by healthy cynicism." Catie James from Blogcritics wrote that the track has "a playful, no nonsense attitude".

== Music video ==
The video for the song is another allusion to the film The Wizard of Oz (In Goodbye Alice in Wonderland, Jewel mentions the "Goodbye yellow brick road"). The inside of the house is black and white, and outside is colorful. The pathway is made of yellow bricks. Similar to the story, the world outside of the house is originally a much nicer place, but slowly becomes less dreamlike and more cruel. Including children chasing Jewel wearing monster masks, a married man lusting after other women, a young girl being taunted for dropping her ice cream cone, parents scolding their children and an elderly gardener being revealed to be an alcoholic.

== In popular culture ==
The song was used in the Las Vegas season 4 episode "Father of the Bride Redux" as well as the 7th Heaven season 11 premiere "Turn, Turn, Turn".

== Chart performance ==
Chart (2006)	Peak Position
US Adult Pop Airplay (Billboard)	30
