= Oh Land (album) =

Studio album by Oh Land
- Released: 14 March 2011
- Recorded: 2009–2010
- Studio: Mr. Dan's Streathem (Streatham); Premier Recording Studio (New York City); Secret Frequency Studio (Los Angeles)
- Genre: Club; dance; electropop
- Length: 39:53
- Label: Fake Diamond; Epic; A:larm Music
- Producer: Dan Carey; Dave McCracken; Lester Mendez; Kristian Leth; Fridolin Nordsø

Oh Land chronology
Fauna (2008)	Oh Land (2011)	Wish Bone (2013)

Singles from Oh Land
- 1. "Sun of a Gun" Released: 4 October 2010; 2. "Wolf & I" Released: 13 March 2011; 3. "Voodoo" Released: 1 April 2011; 4. "White Nights" Released: 22 May 2011

Oh Land is the second studio album by Danish singer Oh Land, released on 14 March 2011 by Fake Diamond Records, Epic Records, and A:larm Music. Before moving to Brooklyn in 2010, she met with a representative from Epic Records at a SXSW event and was eventually signed to the label in 2009. She began working on the album, collaborating with musicians like Jimmy Harry, Dan Carey, and Lester Mendez. A digital extended play titled Oh Land EP was released in October 2010, featuring five songs that would later appear on the parent album.

The album was produced by Carey, Mendez, Dave McCracken, Kristian Leth, and Fridolin Nordsø. Oh Land covers various genres, such as club, dance, and electropop music. Other influences for the singer included disco and synth-pop. The album received generally positive reviews from music critics; positive comments were aimed at Oh Land's style and her decision to sing the music of several genres. More negative feedback called the songs forgettable and too similar to other artists in the industry. The album was reissued in Denmark on 5 December 2011 and featured five previously unreleased bonus tracks.

Five singles were released from the album, including lead single "Sun of a Gun" which charted in five countries. "White Nights" and "Speak Out Now" both charted within the top 20 in Denmark and were certified gold for sales of over 10,000 copies each. "Wolf & I" and "Voodoo" were released exclusively in the United States and United Kingdom, respectively. Promotional single "We Turn It Up" was sent out for airplay rotation in Denmark. The album itself entered the charts in Denmark and the United States, becoming certified platinum in the former country by IFPI Denmark for sales upwards of 20,000 physical copies. In the latter, it entered the lower regions on the Billboard 200, Top Alternative Albums and Top Rock Albums charts.

== Background ==
In November 2008, Oh Land released her debut album,Fauna, which was entirely self-produced and released by Fake Diamond Records. To promote the record, she booked several live events around the United States. At the 2009 SXSW event, she met a representative from Epic Records and signed with them. Following the encounter, she moved to Brooklyn to begin recording new material for her second album. Recording sessions for the project took place throughout 2009 and 2010 at various studios: Mr. Dan's Streathem in Streatham, Premier Recording Studio in New York City, and Secret Frequency Studio in Los Angeles. On 19 October 2010, Epic Records released a digital extended play titled Oh Land EP which features five tracks from the parent album ("Sun of a Gun", "White Nights", "We Turn It Up", "Rainbow", and "Wolf & I"). It was later released in Canada on 8 February 2011.

The standard edition of Oh Land was released firstly in Denmark on 14 March 2011. The following day, it was released in the United States and Canada. It was not released in other European territories until later in the year. A reissued version of Oh Land was distributed exclusively in Denmark on 5 December and featured three previously unreleased bonus tracks ("Speak Out Now", "Twist", and "En Linedanser"), the official music video for "White Nights", and a live performance recording of "We Turn It Up".

== Composition and lyrics ==
According to Andrew Leahey of AllMusic, Oh Land is a combination of "club, dance, and nocturnal electro-pop". The album opens with "Perfection", which was co-written and produced by Dan Carey. It features "dreamy violin-laden confessions" and was called a "take on Misery-era Blonde Redhead" by Drowned in Sound's John Calvert. "Break the Chain" references the singer's back injury following a dancing accident, where she refuses doctor's orders by continuing to pursue her dreams; it contains dubstep and flamenco "undertones" in addition to shackle sound effects. "Sun of a Gun" uses a metaphor regarding the orbit of the sun to describe being in love with someone who is "destructive" and "dangerous". The song's Europop sound was compared to the works of Kylie Minogue and Goldfrapp. The fourth track and third single, "Voodoo", is a synth-pop track that has Oh Land performing a "spoken word verse over disco beats". BBC Music's Fraser McAlpine wrote that the track's style was similar to the work of Marina and the Diamonds. He also compared the album's fifth track, "Lean", to Massive Attack's "Teardrop" (1998). "Lean" and "Wolf & I" are trip hop tracks, with the latter being described as dramatic by Gaffa's Michael Jose Gonzalez.

"Human", the album's seventh track, is an emo-disco barnstormer" that sounds Robyn-esque. Barry Walters from Spin stated that the song "violates just as many grammar rules as the Killers". "White Nights" is the fourth single and is lyrically about dreaming. As described by Leahey from AllMusic, the track blends Motown, synth-pop, and Tropicália into one song. "Helicopter" is the ninth track and is a collaboration between Oh Land and songwriter/producer Lester Mendez. It is reminiscent of Feist's work and features "skittish electronics and dubby beats". The following track is "We Turn It Up", which McAlpine considered "perky enough to have served as a replacement for that Shakira World Cup song". It was also described as a "silly kiss-off party song". The album closes with "Rainbow", which John Calvert felt was influenced by Oh Land's decision to move to Brooklyn.

== Promotion ==
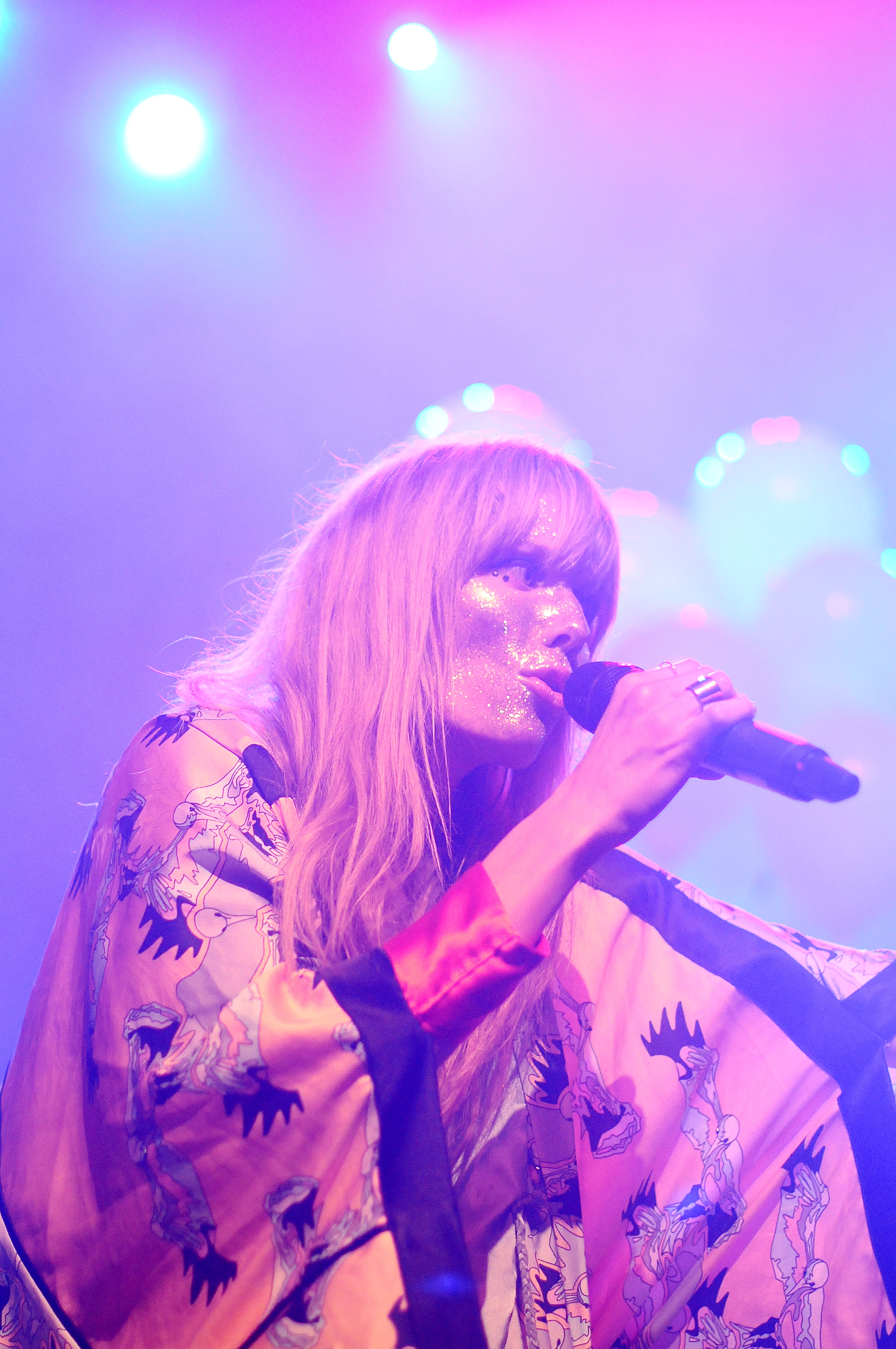
Oh Land performing live in Los Angeles in 2011.

In May 2011, A:larm Music released an EP titled Live Sessions containing live versions of "Sun of a Gun", "Voodoo", and "Wolf & I", in addition to a cover of "White Winter Hymnal" by Fleet Foxes. That same year, a promotional CD single for "We Turn It Up" was distributed to radio stations throughout Denmark. From the Danish deluxe edition of Oh Land, bonus track "Speak Out Now" was released as a single and then used as the opening and closing theme song to the Danish TV series Rita, which debuted in 2012. "Twist" was featured on the official soundtrack to the 2011 film Abduction. She also sang "Sun of a Gun" on several occasions, including on Jimmy Kimmel Live! and at a Billboard promotional effort, both in 2011, and at three nightclub shows throughout New York City, immediately following the single's initial release.

Oh Land also released a series of promotional music videos for several of the songs on her Vevo account. The video for "Rainbow" was released on 16 June 2011 and directed by Eske Kath. Live promotional videos were produced for "Wolf & I", "Sun of a Gun", "White Nights", and "Perfection". Other videos displayed Oh Land performing "Lean" with a string quartet, playing "Break the Chain" with several trash cans, and performing "Perfection" with an all-girls chorus. On 24 February 2012, the singer performed various songs from the album live at the Heaven nightclub in London.

=== Singles ===
"Sun of a Gun" was released as the album's lead single on 4 October 2010. An accompanying music video, directed by production company ThirtyTwo, was released onto her Vevo account on 19 October. The single charted in five countries, including Austria, Belgium, Denmark, and Germany. It also peaked at number 12 on Billboard's Dance Club Songs chart in the United States. Unlike "Sun of a Gun", the succeeding two singles did not chart. "Wolf & I" served as the second single and was distributed by RCA Records as a CD single in the United States on 13 March 2011. A live rendition of the song was used as the music video and featured Oh Land singing in a room filled with balloons. The album's third single, "Voodoo", was released digitally in the United Kingdom on 1 April 2011.

"White Nights" is the fourth single from Oh Land. A digital EP with four versions of the track was released on 22 May 2011 in Germany. The official music video displays Oh Land in a "two-sided dream world" and was released on 9 August 2011. It was successful in Denmark where it peaked at number thirteen and became her first top twenty single. It was later certified gold in that same country for physical sales upwards of 10,000 copies. "Speak Out Now" is the album's fifth and final single and was used as a bonus track on the Danish deluxe edition. It also was commercially successful, reaching number four in Denmark and becoming her highest entry on the chart. On Denmark's digital component chart compiled by Billboard, it likewise peaked at number four. Like "White Nights", it was also certified gold in her home country.

== Critical reception ==
Professional ratings
Aggregate scores
Source	Rating
Metacritic	62/100
Review scores
Source	Rating
AllMusic	3.5/5 stars
BBC Music	mixed
Berlingske	5/6 stars
Billboard	positive
Drowned in Sound	5/10
Ekstra Bladet	5/6 stars
Gaffa	5/6 stars
Politiken	4/6 stars
Slant Magazine	3.5/5 stars
Spin	7/10

Oh Land received generally positive reviews from music critics. At Metacritic, which assigns a weighted mean rating out of 100 to reviews from mainstream critics, the album received an average score of 62, based on seven reviews. Barry Walters of Spin wrote, "This stunning Dane's synths-plus-strings slant on singer-songwriter lovesickness offers refinement over innovation, yet Nanna Øland Fabricius beguiles with a gently insistent presence." Kerri Mason of Billboard opined that Oh Land "might have made the year's first great left-field pop album", praising the songs as "endlessly catchy" and concluding that "the tilting scales of light and dark give the collection a definite creep factor and a clever complexity." AllMusic's Andrew Leahey described the album as an "'anything goes' mix" of multiple genres, adding that Oh Land "doesn't rewrite the rule book as much as join the ranks of La Roux, Little Boots, and Janelle Monáe. But that doesn't keep her debut album from churning out a number of intelligent club anthems".

In a mixed review, Slant Magazine's Sal Cinquemani expressed that Oh Land's "cinematic arrangements bring Janelle Monáe's ambitious approach to pop music to mind, but tracks like 'Wolf & I' and 'Lean' draw a bit too heavily from the trip-hop playbook [...] and, however well-excecuted [sic] they may be, end up sounding derivative." Similarly, Fraser McAlpine of BBC Music felt that "there's a bit of an identity void at the heart of the thing, a lack of personality. It might just be that Oh Land is more skilled at getting songs to sound current than she is at expressing herself." Drowned in Sound's John Calvert called the album "hip, diverse and always vibrant", but also branded it "pretty forgettable". Calvert pointed out the production work of Dave McCracken and Dan Carey, noting the album "inhabits a tepid middle ground between the two extremes—offering neither gilded Scandi chart-pop (Robyn, Annie) or the artistic mettle of Scandi indie bands, most of whom are able to turn out sublime pop anyway."

== Commercial performance ==
Oh Land debuted on the Danish Albums chart at number 32 on 18 March 2011. It peaked at number five the following week and spent a total of four weeks within the top ten. It reappeared at number five on 15 July 2011 and charted for 50 non-consecutive weeks. The album was certified platinum by IFPI Denmark on 11 December 2012, signifying sales upwards of 20,000 copies. It also entered the year-end charts for both 2011 and 2012, landing at positions 31 and 50, respectively. Oh Land became the singer's first and only album to chart on the Billboard 200 chart in the United States, where it peaked at number 184. It entered the Top Current Albums chart, where it was the 157th best selling album of the week. In the same country, Oh Land also entered the Top Alternative Albums and Top Rock Albums charts, where the album peaked at numbers 24 and 43, respectively.

== Track listing ==
Oh Land – Standard edition
No.	Title	Writer(s)	Producer	Length
1.	"Perfection"	Nanna Øland Fabricius; Dan Carey	Carey	4:59
2.	"Break the Chain"	Fabricius; Dave McCracken	McCracken	3:17
3.	"Sun of a Gun"	Fabricius; Jimmy Harry	McCracken	3:25
4.	"Voodoo"	Fabricius; Carey	Carey	2:51
5.	"Lean"	Fabricius; Carey	Carey	3:28
6.	"Wolf & I"	Fabricius; Owen Beverly	Carey	4:37
7.	"Human"	Fabricius; E. Kidd Bogart	Carey	4:08
8.	"White Nights"	Fabricius; McCracken	McCracken	3:45
9.	"Helicopter"	Fabricius; Lester Mendez	Mendez	3:31
10.	"We Turn It Up"	Fabricius; McCracken; Brian Fallon	McCracken	2:31
11.	"Rainbow"	Fabricius; McCracken	McCracken	3:21
Total length:				39:53

Oh Land – Digital edition bonus videos (except Nordic countries)
No.	Title	Length
12.	"Sun of a Gun" (music video)	3:23
13.	"Sun of a Gun" (live)	3:20
14.	"White Nights" (live)	3:42
15.	"Wolf & I" (live)	5:04
16.	"Perfection" (live)	4:43
Total length:		60:05

Oh Land – Denmark deluxe edition bonus tracks
No.	Title	Writer(s)	Producer	Length
12.	"Speak Out Now"	Fabricius; Kristian Leth; Fridolin Nordsø	Leth; Nordsø	3:28
13.	"Twist"	Fabricius; Ryan Breen	Carey	2:52
14.	"En Linedanser"	Fabricius		3:38
15.	"White Nights" (music video)			4:06
16.	"We Turn It Up" (live)			3:36
Total length:				57:33

Oh Land EP – United States CD edition
No.	Title	Writer(s)	Producer	Length
1.	"Sun of a Gun"	Fabricius; Harry	McCracken	3:25
2.	"White Nights"	Fabricius; McCracken	McCracken	3:45
3.	"Rainbow"	Fabricius; McCracken	McCracken	3:21
4.	"Wolf & I"	Fabricius; Beverly	Carey	4:37
5.	"Sun of a Gun" (Yuksek Remix)	Fabricius; Harry	McCracken	4:26
6.	"Sun of a Gun" (Savage Skulls Remix)	Fabricius; Harry	McCracken	4:37
Total length:				24:11

Oh Land EP – United States digital edition
No.	Title	Writer(s)	Producer	Length
1.	"Sun of a Gun"	Fabricius; Harry	McCracken	3:25
2.	"White Nights"	Fabricius; McCracken	McCracken	3:45
3.	"Rainbow"	Fabricius; McCracken	McCracken	3:20
4.	"Wolf & I"	Fabricius; Beverly	Carey	4:35
Total length:				15:05

Oh Land EP – Canada digital edition
No.	Title	Writer(s)	Producer	Length
1.	"Sun of a Gun"	Fabricius; Harry	McCracken	3:25
2.	"White Nights"	Fabricius; McCracken	McCracken	3:45
3.	"We Turn It Up"	Fabricius; McCracken; Fallon	McCracken	2:30
4.	"Rainbow"	Fabricius; McCracken	McCracken	3:21
5.	"Wolf & I"	Fabricius; Beverly	Carey	4:35
Total length:				17:36

== Personnel ==
Credits adapted from the liner notes of Oh Land.

- Oh Land – vocals, choir, choir arrangement, vocal arrangement (all tracks); string arrangements (tracks 1, 5); instrumentation (tracks 2–8, 10, 11)
- Jonathan Adelman – booking
- Adam Ayan – mastering (track 4)
- Ben Baptie – mixing assistance (track 4)
- Angus Baskerville – booking
- Charlie Bisharat – violin (track 9)
- Dan Carey – engineering, production (tracks 1, 4–7); mixing (tracks 1, 5, 6); string arrangements (tracks 1, 5); instrumentation (tracks 4–7)
- Marty Diamond – booking
- Isabella Dunn – cello (tracks 1, 5, 7)
- Jason Edwards – booking
- Tom Elmhirst – mixing (track 4)
- Robbie Fimmano – photography
- Serban Ghenea – mixing (tracks 3, 7, 8, 10)
- John Hanes – mixing assistance (tracks 3, 7, 8, 10)
- Mikkel Hess – drum performance (tracks 2, 3, 8, 10, 11)
- Todd Interland – management
- Eske Kath – artwork
- Jesper Kemp – booking
- Farra Mathews – A&R, management
- Dave McCracken – instrumentation, production (tracks 2, 3, 8, 10, 11)
- Lester Mendez – engineering, keyboards, piano, production, programming, string arrangements (track 9)
- NR2154 – art direction, design
- Joel Numa – engineering (track 9)
- John O'Mahony – mixing (tracks 2, 9, 11)
- Stella Page – violin (tracks 1, 5, 7)
- Antonia Pagulatos – violin (tracks 1, 5, 7)
- Mike Pagulatos – viola (tracks 1, 5, 7)
- Sophie Rivlin – cello (track 7)
- Andros Rodriguez – engineering (tracks 2, 3, 8, 10, 11)
- Alexis Smith – engineering (tracks 1, 4–7); mixing assistance (tracks 1, 5, 6)
- Cameron Stone – cello (track 9)
- Max de Wardener – string arrangements and conducting (track 7)

== Charts ==
=== Weekly charts ===
Weekly chart performance for Oh Land
Chart (2011)	Peak position
Danish Albums (Hitlisten)	5
US Billboard 200	184
US Heatseekers Albums (Billboard)	5
US Top Alternative Albums (Billboard)	24
US Top Rock Albums (Billboard)	43

=== Year-end charts ===
2011 year-end chart performance for Oh Land
Chart (2011)	Position
Danish Albums (Hitlisten)	31

2012 year-end chart performance for Oh Land
Chart (2012)	Position
Danish Albums (Hitlisten)	50

== Certifications ==
Certifications for Oh Land
Region	Certification	Certified units/sales
Denmark (IFPI Danmark)	Platinum	20,000^{^}
^{^} Shipments figures based on certification alone.

== Release history ==
Region	Date	Format(s)	Edition	Label	Ref.
Denmark	14 March 2011	CD; LP; digital download	Standard	Fake Diamond; A:larm	
United States	15 March 2011	CD; digital download	Standard	Epic	
Canada	15 March 2011	Digital download	Standard	Sony	
Canada	24 May 2011	CD	Standard	Sony	
France	6 June 2011	CD	Standard	Sony	
France	13 June 2011	Digital download	Standard	Sony	
Poland	13 June 2011	CD	Standard	Sony	
United Kingdom	13 June 2011	Digital download	Standard	Epic	
Germany	5 August 2011	CD; digital download	Standard	Sony	
Italy	25 October 2011	CD; digital download	Standard	Sony	
United Kingdom	21 November 2011	CD	Standard	RCA	
Denmark	5 December 2011	CD; digital download	Deluxe	Fake Diamond; A:larm	
