= Kurt Markus =

American photographer, cinematographer, screenwriter (1947–2022)

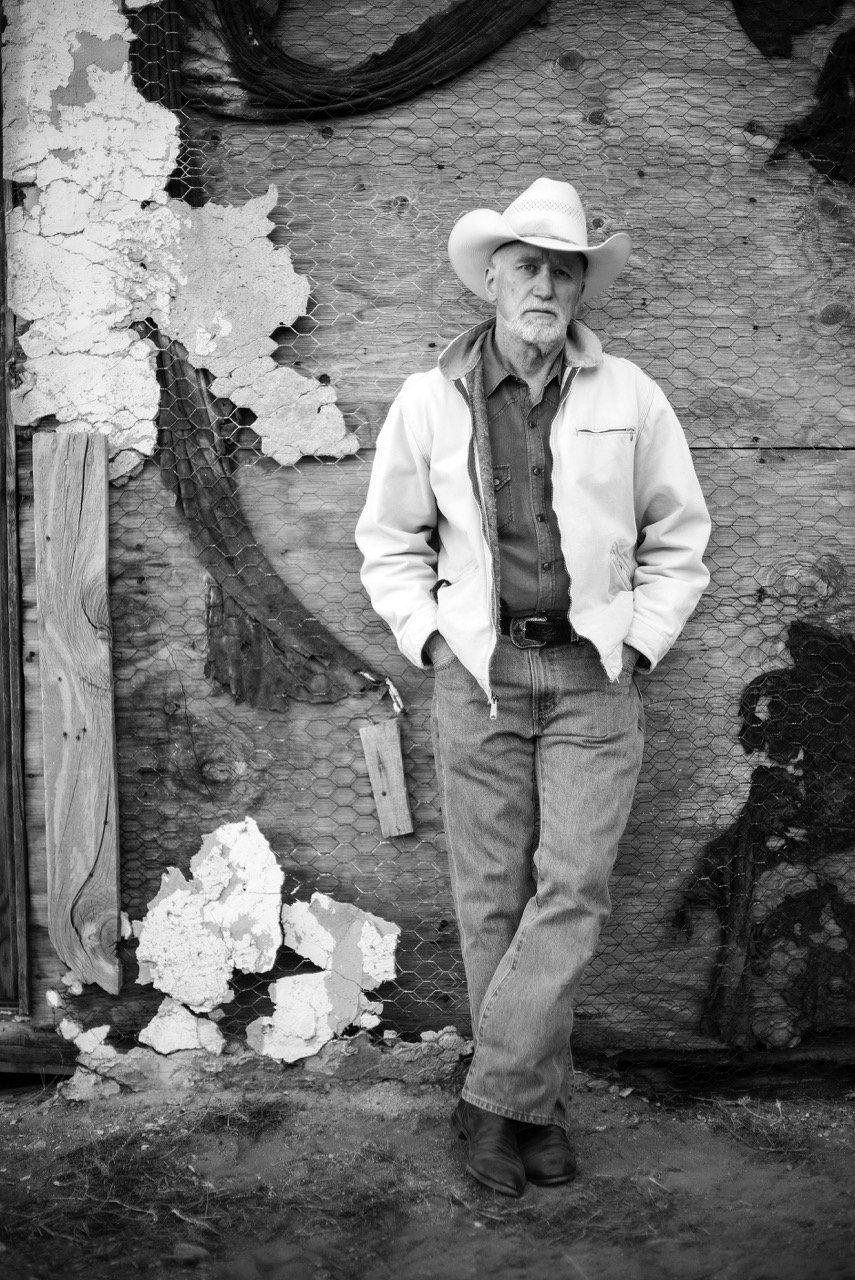
Kurt Markus

Kurt Markus (April 6, 1947 – June 12, 2022) was an American photographer, cinematographer and screenwriter.

Born in rural Montana and self-taught, Markus was a nationally and internationally published photographer. He won major awards for his editorial, advertising, and personal work. His photographs are critically renowned.

== Early life ==
Kurt Michael Markus was born the eldest child of Raymond Markus and Juanita (Johnson) Markus in Whitefish, Montana, on April 6, 1947.

== Career ==
Markus's personal work began with a focus on American West cowboys, which is perhaps his most-acclaimed subject to this day. "His timeless photographs explore the rugged yet romantic spirit of the cowboy...Markus reveals an era that is all but forgotten today. In his photography, Markus documents a life style of solitude and difficulty, yet to the viewers, a sense of romance; a hard life of plain food, plain surroundings, horses, and exposure to the elements, and yet a simple life free of inherent stress... [He is] a truly amazing photographer of the fashion and travel industry".

Since then, he lived various lives as a photographer, making his mark in landscape, figure study, celebrity, fashion, sports, travel, and more. "Whatever the theme, he is most known for his sense of realism and his decidedly direct and not the least bit artificial approach". Although most of his career was devoted to photography, he also created music videos and films.

In 1994, Markus was one of five photographers to participate in a special 25th-anniversary edition of Rolling Stone magazine presenting the living legends of rock-n-roll. In 1999, Markus won a Life magazine Alfred Eisenstaedt Photography Award for his Rolling Stone "Sports Hall of Fame" shots of triathlete Peter Kotland.

In 2003, Markus filmed a music video and photographed the album art for Tori Amos's Scarlet's Walk. "Tori felt that Kurt's love for America went hand-in-hand with the theme."

In 2006, Markus filmed Jewel's music video Goodbye Alice in Wonderland spontaneously, after a photo shoot at her Texas ranch. "The homegrown clip beautifully reflects both the song's organic, intimate sound and its powerfully autobiographical story." Markus shot the video entirely with a classic Super 8 camera.

The New Yorker magazine praised Markus's photographs in the Staley-Wise exhibition America the Beautiful (March 6 – May 9, 2009). "If anyone steals the show, it's Kurt Markus, whose six photographs (many of cowboys) are quietly, unfailingly artful".

In 2009, David Roberts published The Last of His Kind, a biography about mountaineer Bradford Washburn. The biography features Markus's portrait of Washburn at age 93. Roberts says, "Kurt Markus's deft profile of Brad in 'Outside' remains the definitive assessment of Washburn as a master photographer."

On July 2, 2009, Markus again set out with the classic Super 8 camera. This time with his son, Ian Markus, to create a documentary film of John Mellencamp's 2009 summer tour and recording called It's About You. While Kurt shot in 8mm, his son and assisting cameraman, Ian Markus, filmed digitally and captured sound. The film is undergoing production. Markus's approach will "capture the unrefined truth of his experience with Mellencamp."

In 2010, Markus wrote a screenplay, Deep Six. It won the Los Angeles Cinema Awards' "Merit Award" and the Los Angeles Movie Awards' "Honorable Mention".

In his book Buckaroo, Markus reflects on himself and his profession, saying this.

I was not born to ranching. I was born a daydreamer, and I know of no slot for one of those on any ranch. At times I am saddened that I am not what I photograph. Always the observer, seldom the participant, what I am made of remains unanswered. My distance protects me, physically and emotionally; from getting as busted up as I ought to sometimes. Which is why you're not going to get the whole truth from me. I have entered into an unspoken, unwritten and generally inscrutable pact with the people I have photographed and lived among: if I promise not to tell all I know about them, they will do the same for me. In most cases, I have more to hide. My consolation is a simple-heartedness I would not exchange. The greenest cowboy alive has my respect, and I have no problem whatsoever photographing people who are possessed with the determination to do what I cannot. The awful truth is that I love all of cowboying, even when everything has gone wrong and it's not looking to get any better. Sometimes I especially like it that way.

"When asked his idea of beauty, Markus says, 'A two-page spread, either in a magazine or in a book. On one page, great writing, presented in a beautiful typeface, classically designed, on the opposite, a memorable photograph. It doesn't get any more beautiful than that.' About his work, Markus says, 'I have been lucky in my work. I consider it a gift to have found photography and made my life in it. If I reflect for a moment on the people I've met and the places I've been, the memory gives me both satisfaction and energy. More than ever I am eager to do the work I love.

== Personal life ==
His first marriage to Debra Jean Spencer, with whom he had a daughter, Jade, ended in 1980.

Markus lived in Kalispell, Montana, with his wife Maria Donoghue whom he married in 1983.

His sons, Weston and Ian, have both assisted him on major shoots and are continuing along their own paths in film and photography.

=== Death ===
He died at his home in Santa Fe, New Mexico, on June 12, 2022, at the age of 75. He suffered from Parkinson’s disease and Lewy body dementia prior to his death.

== See also ==
- List of American artists
- List of American writers
- List of photographers
- List of people from Montana
- List of people from New Mexico
