= This Way (Jewel album) =

2001 studio album by Jewel

Studio album by Jewel
- Released: November 13, 2001
- Recorded: November 2000 – August 2001
- Studios: Emerald Entertainment and Ocean Way Nashville (Nashville, Tennessee); Sound Kitchen (Franklin, Tennessee)
- Genres: Pop rock; folk
- Length: 58:42
- Label: Atlantic
- Producers: Jewel; Dann Huff

Jewel chronology
| Joy: A Holiday Collection (1999) | This Way (2001) | 0304 (2003) |

Singles from This Way
- 1. "Standing Still" Released: October 2, 2001; 2. "Break Me" Released: January 27, 2002; 3. "This Way" Released: June 12, 2002; 4. "Serve the Ego" Released: September 24, 2002

Professional ratings
Aggregate scores
| Source | Rating |
|---|---|
| Metacritic | 59/100 |
Review scores
| Source | Rating |
| AllMusic | 4/5 stars |
| Blender | 2/5 stars |
| Entertainment Weekly | C− |
| New York Post | 4/4 stars |
| Rolling Stone | 3.5/5 stars |
| Slant Magazine | 3/5 stars |
| USA Today | 3/4 stars |

This Way is the fourth studio album by American singer-songwriter Jewel, released on November 13, 2001, by Atlantic Records. Jewel was looking for a raw, live-sounding album, leading her to be involved in the album's production. The album spawned the singles "Standing Still" and "Break Me", as well as the title track, which was also featured on the soundtrack to the film Life or Something Like It. The final single, "Serve the Ego", was remixed by Hani Num and Mike Rizzo and topped the US Hot Dance Club Play chart. The album debuted at number nine on the US Billboard 200 with first-week sales of 140,000 units. The album was certified platinum by the Recording Industry Association of America (RIAA) on December 17, 2001, and as of June 2010, it had sold over 1.5 million copies in the United States. This Way reached number six in Australia and has since been certified platinum by the Australian Recording Industry Association (ARIA).

== Track listing ==
All tracks are written by Jewel Kilcher, except where noted.

| No. | Title | Writer(s) | Length |
|---|---|---|---|
| 1. | "Standing Still" | Kilcher; Rick Nowels | 4:30 |
| 2. | "Jesus Loves You" | | 3:20 |
| 3. | "Everybody Needs Someone Sometime" | | 4:08 |
| 4. | "Break Me" | | 4:04 |
| 5. | "Do You Want to Play?" | | 2:55 |
| 6. | "Till We Run Out of Road" | Kilcher; Ty Murray | 4:45 |
| 7. | "Serve the Ego" | Kilcher; Cesar Lemos; Itaal Shur | 4:57 |
| 8. | "This Way" | Kilcher; Nowels | 4:16 |
| 9. | "Cleveland" | | 4:09 |
| 10. | "I Won't Walk Away" | Kilcher; Nowels | 4:45 |
| 11. | "Love Me, Just Leave Me Alone" | | 3:47 |
| 12. | "The New Wild West" | | 4:47 |
| Total length: | | | 50:23 |

Bonus Tracks (Recorded Live)
| No. | Title | Length |
|---|---|---|
| 13. | "Grey Matter" | 4:35 |
| 14. | "Sometimes It Be That Way" | 3:41 |
| Total length: | | 59:55 |

Additional Bonus Track (Recorded Live)
| No. | Title | Length |
|---|---|---|
| 15. | "A Long Slow Slide" | 3:37 |
| Total length: | | 62:16 |

== Personnel ==
=== Musicians ===
- Jewel – all vocals
- Tim Akers – keyboards (1–10, 12)
- Tedd T. – programming (1, 8)
- Steve Nathan – keyboards (2, 7, 9, 11), acoustic piano (10)
- David Huff – programming (8)
- Dann Huff – electric guitar
- Russell Powell - acoustic guitar
- Jerry McPherson – electric guitar (1, 2, 6–10)
- John Willis – acoustic guitar (1, 4, 6, 8, 10)
- B. James Lowry – acoustic guitar (2, 3, 5, 7, 9, 12)
- Kenny Greenberg – electric guitar (2, 5, 11)
- J. T. Corenflos – electric guitar (3)
- Gordon Kennedy – electric guitar (5, 11, 12)
- Paul Franklin – steel guitar (6)
- Dan Dugmore – steel guitar (9)
- Jimmie Lee Sloas – bass (1–3, 5, 7–10, 12)
- Jackie Street – bass (4, 6)
- Craig Young – bass (11)
- Chris McHugh – drums (1, 3, 8, 9, 11)
- Steve Brewster – drums (2, 4–7, 10, 12)
- Wayne Rodrigues – drum programming (12)
- Eric Darken – percussion (1, 2, 6–8, 10–12)
- Jonathan Yudkin – fiddle (6), mandolin (12), cello (12)
- George Tidwell – trumpet (10)
- Mark Goldenberg – additional arrangements (2)
- Bekka Bramlett – backing vocals (3)
- Gene Miller – backing vocals (3, 6)
- Chris Rodriguez – backing vocals (3)
- Lisa Cochran – backing vocals (6)

The Nashville String Machine (Tracks 4 & 10)

- Ronn Huff – arrangements and conductor
- Carl Gorodetzky – contractor
- David Angell, Monisa Angell, Janet Askey, Beth Beeson, Lynn Bloom, Bruce Christensen, Conni Ellisor, Carl Gorodetzky, Gerald Greer, Anthony LaMarchina, Lee Larrison, Bob Mason, Cate Myer, Kathryn Plummer, Pamela Sixfin, Calvin Smith, Roger Spencer, Julie Tanner, Alan Umstead, Catherine Umstead, Gary Vanosdale, Mary Kathryn Vanosdale, Glenn Wanner, Karen Winkelmann and Joy Worland – string players

=== Production ===
- Lenedra Carroll – executive producer
- Ron Shapiro – executive producer, A&R
- Gloria Gabriel – A&R
- Jewel – producer
- Dann Huff – producer
- Jeff Balding – recording, mixing
- David Bryant – assistant engineer
- Jed Hackett – assistant engineer
- Robert Hadley – mastering
- Doug Sax – mastering
- The Mastering Lab (Hollywood, California) – mastering location
- Mike "Frog" Griffith – production coordinator
- Chad Farmer – art direction, design
- Ellen Von Unwerth – photography
- Fred Hyser – studio intern

== Charts ==
=== Weekly charts ===
Weekly chart performance for This Way
| Chart (2001–2002) | Peak position |
|---|---|
| Australian Albums (ARIA) | 6 |
| Austrian Albums (Ö3 Austria) | 35 |
| Canadian Albums (Nielsen SoundScan) | 21 |
| Dutch Albums (Album Top 100) | 15 |
| European Albums (Music & Media) | 19 |
| French Albums (SNEP) | 41 |
| German Albums (Offizielle Top 100) | 13 |
| Irish Albums (IRMA) | 12 |
| Japanese Albums (Oricon) | 28 |
| New Zealand Albums (RMNZ) | 26 |
| Norwegian Albums (VG-lista) | 29 |
| Scottish Albums (Official Charts) | 37 |
| Swedish Albums (Sverigetopplistan) | 30 |
| Swiss Albums (Schweizer Hitparade) | 14 |
| UK Albums (Official Charts) | 34 |
| US Billboard 200 | 9 |

=== Year-end charts ===
2001 year-end chart performance for This Way
| Chart (2001) | Position |
|---|---|
| Canadian Albums (Nielsen SoundScan) | 149 |

2002 year-end chart performance for This Way
| Chart (2002) | Position |
|---|---|
| Canadian Albums (Nielsen SoundScan) | 178 |
| US Billboard 200 | 42 |

== Certifications ==
Certifications for This Way
| Region | Certification | Certified units/sales |
|---|---|---|
| Australia (ARIA) | Platinum | 70,000^{^} |
| Canada (Music Canada) | Platinum | 100,000^{^} |
| South Africa (RISA) | Gold | 25,000^{*} |
| United States (RIAA) | Platinum | 1,578,000 |
^{*} Sales figures based on certification alone.^{^} Shipments figures based on certification alone.
