= I Do (Jewel song) =

Single by Jewel

from the album Perfectly Clear
- B-side: "Do You Believe Me Now" (Jimmy Wayne)
- Released: June 23, 2008
- Genre: Country
- Length: 3:20 (Radio Edit); 4:04 (Album Version)
- Label: Valory
- Songwriter: Jewel Kilcher
- Producers: Jewel; John Rich

Jewel singles chronology
"Stronger Woman" (2008)	"I Do" (2008)	"Till It Feels Like Cheating" (2008)

Music video
- "I Do" at CMT.com

"I Do" is a song written and recorded by American recording artist Jewel. It was released in June 2008 as the second single her album Perfectly Clear. The song was Jewel's second Top 40 country hit, although it was less-successful than its predecessor, reaching a peak of number 38 after a short chart run.

== Content ==
"I Do" is a mid-tempo love song backed primarily with percussion and features steel guitar and string fills, and an electric guitar bridge. The narrator describes a love that is troublesome and with barriers that need to be overcome: "Well, our hearts are locked inside an iron box / We're both too afraid to reveal our most tender parts, oh."

== Official versions ==
- "I Do" (Album version) - 4:04
- "I Do" (Radio edit) - 3:20

== Critical reception ==
SFGate recommended "I Do" as one of the best tracks in a review of Perfectly Clear (alongside "Everything Reminds Me of You" and "Till It Feels Like Cheating"). "[They] have a distinct and believable point of view, and the arrangements merge modern Nashville gloss with an acoustic base that works with Jewel's idiosyncratic, breathy voice. Also, her typical lyrical slant — taking a positive yet earthy look at everyday life — fits country music as snugly as two Lego blocks locking together." Hip Online's review of the album, was less favorable, "[It is] pretty, unremarkable. It goes from a total country song like “Stronger Woman” to a folksy track like this is really startling."

== Music video ==
A music video was released for the song, directed by Peter Zavadil. The video begins with Jewel in a car in the parking lot of a restaurant. She steps out of the car walks into the restaurant, approaching real-life husband, Ty Murray. They leave the restaurant and get into separate cars, before speeding down the highway toward each other. They crash and are then shown together in a field of flowers.

== Chart performance ==
"I Do" debuted at number 60 on the Billboard Hot Country Songs chart in July. After 9 weeks on the chart, it reached a peak of number 38.

Chart (2008)	Peak Position
US Hot Country Songs (Billboard)	38
