= Serve the Ego =

Single by Jewel

from the album This Way
- Released: September 24, 2002
- Genre: Pop; folk; (original/album version)
- Length: 4:58
- Label: Atlantic
- Songwriters: Jewel Kilcher; Cesar Lemos; Itaal Shur
- Producer: Atlantic

Jewel singles chronology
"This Way" (2002)	"Serve the Ego" (2002)	"Intuition" (2003)

"Serve the Ego" is a song by Jewel, released on September 24, 2002, as the fourth single from her album This Way. Unlike previous singles released by Jewel, it was her first to be released with numerous club remixes. The song earned Jewel a number-one single on the Billboard Club and Dance and Singles Sales charts in the United States.

== Track listing ==
These are the formats and track listings of major single releases of Serve the Ego.

- US promo 12" single

A1. "Serve the Ego" (Album Edit)
A2. "Serve the Ego" (Mike Rizzo Radio Edit)
A3. "Serve the Ego" (Wayne Rodriguez Radio Edit)
B1. "Serve the Ego" (Mike Rizzo Club Mix)
B2. "Serve the Ego" (Wayne Rodriguez Club Mix)

- US promo CD single
1. "Serve the Ego" (Mike Rizzo Radio Edit)
2. "Serve the Ego" (Wayne Rodriguez Radio Edit)
3. "Serve the Ego" (Album Edit)
- US CD Maxi-single and US 12" single
1. "Serve the Ego" (Hani Num Club Mix)
2. "Serve the Ego" (Mike Rizzo Club Mix)
3. "Serve the Ego" (Wayne Rodriguez Club Mix)
4. "Serve the Ego" (Gabriel & Dresden Club Mix)
5. "Serve the Ego" (Hani Num Dub)
6. "Serve the Ego" (Wayne Rodriguez Dub Mix)
7. "Serve the Ego" (Mike Rizzo Dub Mix)
8. "Serve the Ego" (Gabriel & Dresden Flashback)
- UK 12" single
1. "Serve the Ego" (Hani Num Club Mix)
2. "Serve the Ego" (Gabriel & Dresden Club Mix)

== Charts ==
Chart (2002)	Peak position
UK Singles (Official Charts Company)	197
US Dance Club Songs (Billboard)	1

== See also ==
- List of number-one dance singles of 2002 (U.S.)
