= Intuition (Jewel song) =

2003 single by Jewel

- US CD single cover

Single by Jewel

from the album 0304
- B-side: "Standing Still" (live acoustic)
- Released: April 7, 2003
- Studio: Conway (Hollywood, California)
- Genre: Dance-pop
- Length: 3:49
- Label: Atlantic
- Songwriters: Jewel Kilcher; Lester Mendez
- Producers: Lester Mendez; Jewel Kilcher

Jewel singles chronology
"Serve the Ego" (2002)	"Intuition" (2003)	"Stand" (2003)

"Intuition" is a song by American singer Jewel from her fifth studio album, 0304 (2003). The song was written and produced by Jewel and Lester Mendez. It was released on April 7, 2003, as the album's lead single. Following the club success of "Serve the Ego", Jewel shifted to a more pop-oriented sound with the release of "Intuition". The song, which strays from her usual folk style with simple acoustic guitar instrumentation, starts off with a French accordion and then experiments with dance-oriented beats with subtle urban influences, using synthesizers. The song's lyrics contain a number of references to popular culture, including namechecking celebrities such as singer and actress Jennifer Lopez, model Kate Moss, actor Charlie Sheen, magazines, film culture, and commercialism.

"Intuition" achieved moderate success in the United States, reaching number 20 on the Billboard Hot 100. However, Jewel was criticized for abandoning her traditional folk style in exchange for a new pop sound. After the song was licensed to promote Schick Intuition razors, Rob Walker argued in Slate magazine that she had "[written] a song that tells us all to resist the total marketing mentality...and then [licensed] that song to a consumer products company for a huge sales campaign."

== Background and writing ==
Inspired by the sudden success of scoring a number-one single on the US Billboard Hot Dance Club Play chart with "Serve the Ego"—the final single from her previous album, This Way—in early November 2002, Jewel decided to make a radical departure from her previous folk-oriented musical efforts and recorded a dance album.

"Intuition" was written and produced by Kilcher and Lester Mendez. It features accordions and dance beats, while she urges listeners to follow their hearts but then taunts, "Sell your sin/Just cash in." In another part of the lyrics, she tries to make sense of her own situation on Intuition: "I'm just a simple girl in a hi-tech digital world... in a world of postmodern fad, what was good now is bad."

The song's usage in a $70 million advertising campaign for Schick razors drew controversy due to the song's message of anti-consumerism. Jewel later noted that the song came about in a "not ideal way" which was "the worst of what the music business is", when her label and her then-management got her involved in the Schick campaign. As part of the deal, Jewel had to write a song titled "Intuition" which was to serve as her first single from 0304, although Schick remarked that the song having the same name as its razor was merely "serendipitous". Jewel felt that the creation process for the song was "inorganic" and that it was hard to make the song authentic, but that she did not feel like "the song was a sell-out" and that she is proud of the song. Jewel attributed changes in the music business and an overall decline in music sales for the necessity of commercial product sponsoring to have a music video produced.

== Critical reception ==
The song received mostly positive reviews from contemporary music critics. Todd Burns from Stylus Magazine wrote that the track is "one of the better singles of the year (2003), Jewel's vamps up the scale demand to be imitated whether lovingly or hatefully. Either way, you're singing along, which is exactly the point."

== Versions and commercial performance ==
The final release of the single saw no alteration from the album version. Radio stations, however, did receive a radio edit of the song, only deleting one repeated chorus verse from the ending of the song cutting it down to three minutes and 13 seconds. Commercial singles were released within the US and internationally. In the US there was a CD single and a CD maxi single release, the former contains "Intuition" and "Standing Still" (Live Acoustic Version) while the latter contains club mixes only. The single reached number 20 on the Billboard Hot 100, while topping the Hot Dance Club Play chart for one week.

== Music video ==
A shot from the "Intuition" music video, which shows Jewel pretending to star in a commercial

The music video for "Intuition", directed by Marc Klasfeld, was filmed on March 26, 2003, mainly in home-video quality but would switch to spoofs of commercials (such as Sprite, Levi's, Nike, and Corona) and female pop stars, with sensationalist images in high quality. The original video was later censored, after a lawsuit by Nike for using the swoosh symbol without permission. In part of the video, a fake TRL ticker-tape reads "Jewel's music sounds much better now that she's dancing!" Jewel noted that the video was supposed to be "ironic and funny", but she felt that the video was misunderstood and that "nobody got it."

== Track listings ==
- US CD single
1. "Intuition" – 3:53
2. "Standing Still" (live acoustic version) – 4:56
- US maxi-CD single
1. "Intuition" (Todd Terry In-House mix) – 5:41
2. "Intuition" (Gabriel & Dresden Hi-Tek Digital mix) – 10:50
3. "Intuition" (Markus Schulz Coldharbor mix) – 10:21
4. "Intuition" (Ford's extended mix) – 7:17
5. "Intuition" (Tee's Freeze mix) – 5:39
6. "Intuition" (Gabriel & Dresden rhythm club mix) – 8:17
7. "Intuition" (Tee's Kat mix) – 6:10
8. "Intuition" (Gabriel & Dresden Lo-Tek Analog dub) – 10:30
9. Making of "Intuition" music video
- Australian CD single
1. "Intuition" (album version)
2. "Intuition" (Gabriel & Dresden Hi-Tek digital mix)
3. "Intuition" (Tee's Kat dub)
4. "Intuition" (Markus Schulz club mix)
- UK CD single
1. "Intuition" (album version)
2. "Intuition" (Todd Terry In-House mix)
3. "Intuition" (Ford's radio mix)
4. "Intuition" (Tee's Kat dub)
5. "Intuition" (video)
- European CD single
1. "Intuition" (album version)
2. "Intuition" (Ford's radio mix)
- European maxi-CD single
1. "Intuition" (album version)
2. "Intuition" (Ford's radio mix)
3. "Intuition" (Tee's Kat dub)
4. "Intuition" (Markus Schulz club mix)

== Charts ==
=== Weekly charts ===
Chart (2003)	Peak position
Australia (ARIA)	4
Belgium (Ultratip Bubbling Under Flanders)	2
Europe (Eurochart Hot 100)	27
Germany (GfK)	77
Netherlands (Dutch Top 40)	5
Netherlands (Single Top 100)	9
New Zealand (Recorded Music NZ)	17
Romania (Romanian Top 100)	15
Scotland Singles (Official Charts)	50
Spain (Promusicae)	17
Switzerland (Schweizer Hitparade)	87
UK Singles (Official Charts)	52
US Billboard Hot 100	20
US Adult Pop Airplay (Billboard)	5
US Dance Club Songs (Billboard) Remixes	1
US Dance Singles Sales (Billboard) Remixes	2
US Dance/Mix Show Airplay (Billboard)	9
US Pop Airplay (Billboard)	7

=== Year-end charts ===
Chart (2003)	Position
Australia (ARIA)	43
Netherlands (Dutch Top 40)	53
US Billboard Hot 100	73
US Adult Top 40 (Billboard)	18
US Dance Club Play (Billboard)	25
US Dance Singles Sales (Billboard)	14
US Mainstream Top 40 (Billboard)	39

== Certifications ==
Region	Certification	Certified units/sales
Australia (ARIA)	Gold	35,000^{^}
^{^} Shipments figures based on certification alone.

== Release history ==
Region	Date	Format(s)	Label(s)	Ref.
United States	April 7, 2003	Contemporary hit; hot AC; triple A radio	Atlantic	
Australia	May 26, 2003	CD	Atlantic	
United Kingdom	August 18, 2003	CD	Atlantic	

== See also ==
- List of number-one dance singles of 2003 (U.S.)
