= Spin the Wheel =

Spin the Wheel may refer to:

- Spin the Wheel (game show), a 2019 American game show
- Spin the Wheel (album), by Bellefire, 2004
  - "Spin the Wheel" (song), the title song
- "Spin the Wheel", a song by the Blackeyed Susans from Spin the Bottle, 1997

== See also ==
- Spin the Wheel, Make the Deal, a professional wrestling match type
