= Ilusión (Edurne album) =

Studio album by Edurne
- Released: June 19, 2007
- Genre: Pop
- Label: Epic, Sony BMG
- Producer: Gustav Efraimsson; David Ferrero; Forty4s; Jesper Jakobsson; Fredrik Larsson; Pätrik Ohlsson; Play Production; Graeme Pleeth; Harry Sommerdahl; Mauri Stern; Fredrik Thomander

Edurne chronology
Edurne (2006)	Ilusión (2007)	Première (2008)

Singles from Ilusión
- 1. "Ven por mí" Released: June 2007; 2. "Fue para los dos" Released: November 2007

Ilusión is a 2007 album by Edurne. It reached No. 13 on the Spanish albums chart.

== Track listing ==
No.	Title	Writer(s)	Producer	Length
1.	"No quiero más" (I Don't Want Love)	Victoria Horn, George Nakas, Klas Wahl, Carlos Izaga (adaptation)	Forty4s	3:22
2.	"Sin control" (Life Goes On)	Mia Bergström, Tobias Gustavsson, Fredrik Thomander, Anders Wikström, Gabriel Oré (adaptation)	Thomander	3:46
3.	"Ven por mí" (Come with Me)	Ben Copland, Lisa Lindebergh, Jimmy Monell, Lucas Álvarez de Toledo (adaptation)	David Ferrero	4:21
4.	"No mirar atrás" (Dance With Me)	Terri Bjerre, Johan Bobäck, Joachim Nilsson, Dolo Beltrán (adaptation)	Gustav Efraimsson	3:01
5.	"Ilusión" (Glow)	Jade Ell, Christian Lindberg, Ivar Lisinski, Florian Richter, Ernesto García (adaptation)	Graeme Pleeth, Mauri Stern	3:26
6.	"Fue para los dos" (Brief and Beautiful)	Harry Sommerdahl, Hanne Sørvaag, Izaga (adaptation)	Sommerdahl	3:43
7.	"Los ángeles también pecan" (Venus in Your Hand)	Cutfather, Jay Jay, Engelina Larsen, Adam Powers, Andrés Alcaraz, David López, Diego Vanegas (adaptation)	Pleeth, Stern	3:04
8.	"Hoy voy a estallar" (Come On Over Boy)	Cecilia Gärding, Fredrik Larsson, Beltrán (adaptation)	F. Larsson	3:53
9.	"Aquí se terminó" (Never Forever)	Johan Fransson, Tim Larsson, Tobias Lundgren, Andy Simon, Edurne García Almagro (adaptation)	Play Production	3:35
10.	"Algo cambió" (Still Not Sorry)	George Samuelson, Álvarez de Toledo (adaptation)	Pleeth, Stern	3:33
11.	"Si me dejas en paz" (This Beat Is Mine)	Sofia Berntson, Mary Anne Morgan, Fredrik Rogberg, Álvarez de Toledo (adaptation)	Pleeth, Stern	3:41
12.	"Lo que sientes" (Perfect Bliss)	Jörgen Elofsson, Phil Thornalley, Ernesto García (adaptation)	Jesper Jakobsson, Patrik Ohlsson	3:43
