= Say Something Anyway =

Single by Bellefire

from the album Spin the Wheel
- B-side: "Say Something Anyway (re-mix)"
- Released: April 2004
- Recorded: 2004
- Genre: Pop
- Length: 3:15
- Label: EastWest Records
- Songwriter(s): Jörgen Elofsson; Mathias Venge; Peter Wennerberg
- Producer(s): Jörgen Elofsson; Mathias Venge

Bellefire singles chronology
"All I Want Is You" (2002)	"Say Something Anyway" (2004)	"You Were Meant for Me" (2004)

"Say Something Anyway" was the Irish girl group Bellefire's first single release of their comeback as a 3-piece, after being signed by WEA. It is also included on their album Spin the Wheel. This single received quite a lot of airplay in Ireland (peaking at #5), as well as the United Kingdom (#26 chart peak). During several episodes of a few hit British sitcoms, such as Coronation Street & Emmerdale, Say Something Anyway can clearly be heard in the background during scenes in public buildings, such as pubs and diners.

== Track listing ==
1. "Say Something Anyway"
2. "Say Something Anyway (Bimbo Jones re-mix)"

== Video ==
The video was shot in Cuba and was directed by Andy Hylton. It features the girls in numerous shots around the capital, from driving the signature vehicle of the Spin The Wheel album to singing by a Cuban manor house. It also features three Cuban men, who the girls meet on their way around the city. Their truck has broken down, and they flag the girls down for some oil and invaluable motor expertise. These boys then take the girls around the city in a tour, stopping at the end of a song to enjoy the warmth of a camp fire.
