= No Quiero Más =

Single by Edurne

from the album Ilusión
- Released: April 5, 2007 (SPA - TV)
- Recorded: 2007
- Genre: Pop/Dance
- Length: 3:30

Edurne singles chronology
"Te Falta Veneno" (2006)	"No Quiero Más" (2007)	"Ven Por Mí" (2007)

"No Quiero Más" (English: I Don't Want More) was scheduled to be the first official single from Edurne's second upcoming album by Sony BMG Spain. The single was changed instead of "Ven por mi" which became finally the first single. Nonetheless, the single was premiered on March 25 in a TeleTaxi special Concerts Day "Can Zam 2007".

On April 5, Edurne performed also "No Quiero Más" in a special OT TV Show by Telecinco.

== Charts ==
Chart	Peak position	
Spain Hot 100	Nielsen Spain SoundScan	85
