= Foolish Games =

1997 single by Jewel

Single by Jewel

from the album Pieces of You and Batman & Robin
- A-side: "You Were Meant for Me" (US only)
- B-side: "Angel Needs a Ride"; "Everything Breaks"
- Released: July 8, 1997
- Genre: Pop
- Length: 5:39 (album version); 4:02 (radio edit)
- Label: Atlantic
- Songwriter: Jewel Kilcher
- Producer: Peter Collins

Jewel singles chronology
"You Were Meant for Me" (1996)	"Foolish Games" (1997)	"Morning Song" (1998)

Music video
- "Foolish Games" on YouTube

"Foolish Games" is a song by American singer-songwriter Jewel from her debut studio album, Pieces of You (1995). It was also the third single to be lifted from the Batman & Robin motion-picture soundtrack. Jewel re-recorded the single for the soundtrack to produce a more radio-friendly version, similar to her other singles "Who Will Save Your Soul" and "You Were Meant for Me". This version is shorter than the album version by one verse. The song details the frustration and agony of knowing that the intensity of one's love is not reciprocated by one's lover.

"Foolish Games" was never released as a physical single in the United States, but it appeared as the B-side on the "You Were Meant for Me" single, which peaked at number two on the Billboard Hot 100 in April 1997. Radio stations soon shifted airplay focus to "Foolish Games", and because of chart rules in place at the time, "Foolish Games" became the new A-side. Following a re-release of the single in October 1997, "Foolish Games" / "You Were Meant for Me" returned to the top 10 of the Hot 100, reaching number seven. Because of the manner in which it charted, Billboard lists "Foolish Games" as having a number-two peak despite the song never actually reaching that position on its own.

At the end of 1997, "Foolish Games" / "You Were Meant for Me" was listed as the second-best performing single of the year. It is ranked at number 20 on Billboard's All Time Top 100 and held the Guinness World Record for the longest chart run of a single, 65 weeks, but this achievement has since been surpassed multiple times. Jewel was also nominated for Grammy Award for Best Female Pop Vocal Performance for "Foolish Games". The song was included on Jewel's Greatest Hits as a duet with Kelly Clarkson.

== Release ==
"Foolish Games" was never released commercially in the United States. Instead, when previous single "You Were Meant for Me" was descending the Billboard Hot 100, radio stations flipped the single and began playing its B-side: "Foolish Games". Because of Billboard's chart rules regarding airplay, "Foolish Games" was eventually listed as the single's A-side. The single was removed from retail in July, but frequent airplay allowed it to continue charting. The single was resent to retail outlets on October 7, 1997, and it rebounded to number seven on the Hot 100 in early November.

== Critical reception ==
Stephen Thomas Erlewine from AllMusic described the song as "superior". Chuck Taylor from Billboard stated that it is the "quintessential musical moment" of the Pieces of You album. He wrote that "the vocally sweeping ballad offers the richest arrangement among her hits, with lyrics that affectingly express the emotional descent of a woman whose love is unappreciated, perhaps even unseen, by her object of affection". The magazine also noted that "this piano-anchored ballad places the singer/songwriter in a setting that is almost orchestral and far more lush than those of her previous hits". A reviewer from The Daily Vault said "Foolish Games" "works because of the wailing chorus both tired and yearning".

David Browne from Entertainment Weekly compared Jewel to British singer Kate Bush on the track, in his review. Australian music channel Max placed the song at number 503 in their list of "1000 Greatest Songs of All Time" in 2011. British magazine Music Week wrote, "This 22-year-old Alaskan singer-songwriter has a voice that simply demands your attention and this song of emotional entanglement complements it wonderfully. A gem." Ed Masley from Pittsburgh Post-Gazette described it as an "emotional ballad" with a "chilling climax". Sal Cinquemani from Slant called it "a female-centric take" on Leonard Cohen's "Famous Blue Raincoat", and noted that "Foolish Games" "remains one of the great pop songs of the '90s, buoyed by the singer's impeccably wrenching vocal performance".

== Music video ==
The accompanying music video for "Foolish Games" was directed by American artist, photographer, director, and creative director Matthew Rolston. It is almost colorless and features Jewel performing the song in a pale and barren landscape. Some scenes also feature her riding a horse.

== Track listings ==
- UK, European, and Australian CD single
1. "Foolish Games" (radio edit) – 4:00
2. "Angel Needs a Ride" – 4:17
3. "Everything Breaks" – 3:21
- UK cassette single
1. "Foolish Games"
2. "Angel Needs a Ride"

== Charts ==
=== Weekly charts ===
Chart (1997)	Peak position
Australia (ARIA)	12
Belgium (Ultratip Bubbling Under Flanders)	8
Canada Top Singles (RPM)	2
Canada Adult Contemporary (RPM)	1
Netherlands (Dutch Top 40)	9
Netherlands (Single Top 100)	10
New Zealand (Recorded Music NZ)	23
US Billboard Hot 100 with "You Were Meant for Me"	2
US Adult Contemporary (Billboard)	4
US Adult Pop Airplay (Billboard)	1
US Pop Airplay (Billboard)	1
US Rhythmic Airplay (Billboard)	30

=== Year-end charts ===
Chart (1997)	Position
Australia (ARIA)	47
Canada Adult Contemporary (RPM)	20
Netherlands (Single Top 100)	95
US Billboard Hot 100	2
US Adult Top 40 (Billboard)	12
US Top 40/Mainstream (Billboard)	17

Chart (1998)	Position
Netherlands (Dutch Top 40)	63
Netherlands (Single Top 100)	40
US Billboard Hot 100	87
US Adult Top 40 (Billboard)	64
US Mainstream Top 40 (Billboard)	81

=== Decade-end charts ===
Chart (1990–1999)	Position
US Billboard Hot 100	67

=== All-time charts ===
Chart (1958–2018)	Position
US Billboard Hot 100	20

== Certifications ==
Region	Certification	Certified units/sales
Australia (ARIA)	Gold	35,000^{^}
^{^} Shipments figures based on certification alone.

== Release history ==
Region	Date	Format(s)	Label(s)	Ref.
United States	July 8, 1997	Contemporary hit radio	Atlantic	
United Kingdom	January 19, 1998	CD; cassette	Atlantic	
