= Need to Be Next to You =

2000 single by Leigh Nash

Single by Leigh Nash

from the album Bounce: Music from and Inspired by the Miramax Motion Picture
- Released: 2000
- Genre: Pop
- Length: 3:43
- Label: Miramax; EastWest; The Engine Entertainment
- Songwriter: Diane Warren
- Producer: Matt Serletic

Leigh Nash singles chronology
"Need to Be Next to You" (2000)	"My Idea of Heaven" (2006)

Music video
- "Need to Be Next to You" on YouTube

"Need to Be Next to You" is a song by American singer and songwriter Leigh Nash. It was released in 2000 on Miramax Records, East West Records, and The Engine Entertainment as the artist's debut solo single. It was released as part and as well as the opening track from the film soundtrack album Bounce: Music from and Inspired by the Miramax Motion Picture (2000) to accompany the Bounce film. It is a pop song that was written by Diane Warren and produced by Matt Serletic.

== Track listing ==
Germany CD single
No.	Title	Length
1.	"Need to Be Next to You" (radio edit)
2.	"Need to Be Next to You" (movie mix)

UK promo CD single
No.	Title	Length
1.	"Need to Be Next to You" (radio edit)

All tracks are written by Diane Warren, except for "Walking with Strangers" which was jointly composed by Katisse Buckingham, Marilyn Scott and Terri Lyne Carrington.

Europe CD maxi single
No.	Title	Vocals	Length
1.	"Need to Be Next to You" (radio edit)	Leigh Nash	3:42
2.	"Need to Be Next to You" (movie mix)	Nash	4:55
3.	"Walking with Strangers"	Marilyn Scott	4:52

Video
No.	Title	Writer(s)	Length
1.	"Need to Be Next to You"	Diane Warren

== Charts ==
Chart performance for "Need to Be Next to You"
Chart (2000–2001)	Peak position
Australia (ARIA)	94
US Billboard Hot Adult Top 40 Tracks	23
US Billboard Hot Adult Contemporary Tracks	21

== Cover versions ==
- American country music singer Sara Evans covered this song on her 2003 album Restless.
- Irish girl group Bellefire covered it on their 2004 album Spin the Wheel, under the title "I Need to Be Next to You".
- South African singer Nádine released a cover on her 2007 album As Jy Wonder and also released it as a single.
