= Spin the Wheel (album) =

- Standard album cover

Studio album by Bellefire
- Released: 2004 (Note: The official release of the album is unknown. Source(s) have cited the album's Asian release as being July, while the Japanese edition was released on August 18. Other sources on websites have stated the release date of September and October, and according to music platform's Apple Music and Spotify album release date states November 19.)
- Genre: Pop
- Length: 55:47
- Label: EastWest Records
- Producer: Brian Rawling; Graham Stack; Jörgen Elofsson; Mathias Venge; Matthew Gerard; David James; Alan Ross; Denis Woods; Quizlarossi; Waermo&Englof

Bellefire chronology
After the Rain (2001)	Spin the Wheel (2004)

Alternative cover

Spin the Wheel is the second studio album by the Irish girl group Bellefire. It was released in Asia around July 2004, and the singles garnered high radio airplay and chart positioning. This led to the band touring Southeast Asian countries including the Philippines, Malaysia, Thailand, and Hong Kong. Although the band enjoyed some success in Europe with their singles, they parted ways with their record label EastWest before the album was scheduled for release there.

The album features many covers of famous songs like "You Were Meant for Me", the hit originally performed by Jewel, and "Need to Be Next to You", penned by Diane Warren and sung by Leigh Nash, lead vocalist of Sixpence None the Richer, for the film Bounce. Also included is a cover of Mark Wills' "What Hurts the Most", which was later covered by Jo O'Meara and Rascal Flatts.

== Track listing ==
No.	Title	Length
1.	"Say Something Anyway"
2.	"You Were Meant for Me"
3.	"Spin the Wheel"
4.	"What Hurts the Most"
5.	"Nobody Loves me Like You Do"
6.	"Damn"
7.	"Pieces of You"
8.	"Sold Out"
9.	"Can't Cry Hard Enough"
10.	"Need to Be Next to You"
11.	"Stay"
12.	"I'll Never Get Over You (Getting Over Me)"
13.	"Don't Know Why"

=== Bonus tracks and video CD ===
==== UK edition ====
14. "Nothing at All"

==== Japanese edition ====
14. "Not Letting Go"
15. "To Be with You"

==== Thailand special edition ====
14. "Not Letting Go"
15. "To Be with You"
16. "Spin the Wheel (Groovefinder Edit)"
17. "Say Something Anyway (Bimbo Jones Remix)"

===== Bonus VCD =====
- "Say Something Anyway" (Video)
- "Spin the Wheel" (Video)
- "You Were Meant for Me" (Video)
- E.P.K. (Documentary Video)
- Photo Gallery
