= All I Want Is You (U2 song) =

1989 single by U2

Single by U2

from the album Rattle and Hum
- Released: 12 June 1989
- Studio: A&M (Los Angeles)
- Genre: Rock
- Length: 6:30 (album version); 4:14 (single version)
- Label: Island
- Composer: U2
- Lyricist: Bono
- Producer: Jimmy Iovine

U2 singles chronology
"When Love Comes to Town" (1989)	"All I Want Is You" (1989)	"The Fly" (1991)

Music video
- "All I Want Is You" on YouTube

"All I Want Is You" is a song by Irish rock band U2. It is the final track on their 1988 album, Rattle and Hum, and was released as its fourth and final single on 12 June 1989. It also appears in the Rattle and Hum film, playing over the closing credits.

== History ==
"All I Want Is You" was released in the UK as a single on 12 June 1989. The B-side featured covers of The Righteous Brothers' "Unchained Melody", and a cover of Love Affair's "Everlasting Love". It reached number 4 in the UK charts and number 2 in Australia, number 12 on the Dutch Top 40, but only reached number 67 and number 83 in the Canadian and American charts, respectively. "Everlasting Love" reached number 10 in the Dutch Charts, in January 1990.

It appeared on the soundtrack for the 1994 film Reality Bites. The popularity of the song in the film led to a re-release in 1994 where it reached number 38 in the U.S. Top 40 Mainstream charts. The single was rereleased in the Netherlands with "Everlasting Love" now being the A-side. In 2004, it was ranked number 9 in Entertainment Weekly's list of "The 50 Greatest Love Songs".

String arrangements on the song are by Van Dyke Parks. Benmont Tench is credited for keyboards, though he said in an interview in The Boston Globe in 2014: "I couldn't figure out what to play because the song seemed complete, and eventually the Edge said, 'Why don't you play this little figure?' and it's in there somewhere buried in the mix and as a result everyone always credits me with having played with U2."

It is also featured during an episode of Hindsight and the final scenes of the 2011 film Contagion. The song "October" appears on the compilation album The Best of 1980–1990 as a hidden track encoded within the track for "All I Want Is You" following about a minute of silence.

== Music video ==
Director Meiert Avis shot the promotional video in the town of Ostia, outside Rome on 18 April 1989. Written by Barry Devlin, the video takes an unusual cinematic approach to the song, with U2 band members making only brief cameo appearances. The video tells the story of a person with dwarfism, played by Paolo Risi, who falls in love with a trapeze artist, played by Paola Rinaldi, one of whom apparently dies towards the end. While there is disagreement amongst fans about exactly who has died, The Edge was quoted as saying it is the trapeze artist who dies.

The video pays homage to Fellini, who was shooting his last movie, La voce della luna, only a few miles away from the U2 set, and also to Tod Browning's 1932 film Freaks.

== Live performances ==
"All I Want Is You" was played at almost every date of 1989's Lovetown Tour, occasionally segueing into "Bad", with which it shares considerable musical similarity. It has since been featured in some capacity at every subsequent tour until the Joshua Tree Tours 2017 and 2019. On the Zoo TV Tour in 1992 and 1993, it was usually merely a snippet at the end of "Bad," but occasionally Bono would perform a solo abbreviated version. The version played on 1997's PopMart Tour was much more complete, and subsequent live performances have been of the entire song. During its performance on 2001's Elevation Tour, it would segue into "Where the Streets Have No Name". Another version was eventually played on their Vertigo Tour, in the usual place of "Miracle Drug". The song also closed some shows of the 4th leg, in South America, and finally closed the tour in Honolulu, on 9 December 2006. "All I Want Is You" has also seen occasional appearances on the U2 360° Tour. At the 2 July 2011 show in Nashville, Bono invited a blind fan onstage to play "All I Want Is You" on guitar for his wife after normal set closer "Moment of Surrender". After the song, Bono gave the fan his Gretsch Irish Falcon guitar. The song was played six times on the Innocence + Experience Tour. The song was not played on the Joshua Tree Tours 2017 and 2019 or the Experience + Innocence Tour in 2018, but was played at a promotional appearance in 2017 for the Songs of Experience album, and featured an orchestra for the first time. It was also played at 37 of the 40 concerts from the band's 2023–2024 residency U2:UV Achtung Baby Live at Sphere. Performances on video are also included on PopMart: Live from Mexico City, U2 Go Home: Live from Slane Castle, Ireland, and Vertigo 05: Live from Milan.

== Track listings ==
The first track on all versions of the single is an edited version of "All I Want Is You". "Unchained Melody" was featured on the 7", 12" and CD versions of the single, and the full version of "All I Want Is You" was only featured on the CD versions of the single.

No.	Title	Writer(s)	Producer	Length
1.	"All I Want Is You" (Single version)	Bono (words), U2 (music)	Jimmy Iovine	4:14
2.	"Unchained Melody"	North, Zarrett [sic]	U2	4:52
3.	"Everlasting Love"	Mac Gayden, Buzz Cason	U2	3:20
4.	"All I Want Is You" (Album version)	Bono (words), U2 (music)	Jimmy Iovine	6:30

== Personnel ==
U2

- Bono – vocals, guitar
- The Edge – guitar
- Adam Clayton – bass guitar
- Larry Mullen Jr. – drums

Additional performers

- Van Dyke Parks – string arrangement
- Benmont Tench – keyboards

Technical personnel

- Jimmy Iovine – production
- David Tickle – recording, mixing
- Rob Jacobs – mixing

== Chart positions ==
"All I Want Is You"

Chart (1989)	Peak position
Australian ARIA Chart	2
Canada RPM Top 100 Singles	67
Netherlands (Dutch Top 40)	12
Netherlands (Single Top 100)	12
Finland (Suomen virallinen lista)	8
Irish Singles Chart	1
Italy (Musica e Dischi)	8
New Zealand Singles Chart	2
UK Singles Chart	4
US Billboard Hot 100	83
US Album Rock Tracks	13

Chart (1994)	Peak position
US Pop Airplay (Billboard)	38

"Everlasting Love"

Chart (1989–90)	Peak position
Netherlands (Dutch Top 40)	10
Netherlands (Single Top 100)	10
US Alternative Airplay (Billboard)	11

== Certifications ==
Certifications for "All I Want Is You"
Region	Certification	Certified units/sales
New Zealand (RMNZ)	Platinum	30,000^{‡}
United Kingdom (BPI) Sales since 2004	Silver	200,000^{‡}
^{‡} Sales+streaming figures based on certification alone.

== Bellefire version ==
"All I Want Is You"

Single by Bellefire

from the album After the Rain
- Released: April 2002
- Length: 3:33
- Label: Virgin
- Composer: U2
- Lyricist: Bono
- Producers: Richard "Biff" Stannard; Julian Gallagher

Bellefire singles chronology
"Buzzstyle (Find My Way)" (2001)	"All I Want Is You" (2002)	"Say Something Anyway" (2004)

"All I Want Is You" was covered by Irish girl group Bellefire for their debut album, After the Rain (2001). It reached number five in Ireland and number 18 in the UK.

=== Music video ===
The video depicts Bellefire walking near a beach and a group of six male equestrians playing polocrosse on the beach; in the second verse the girls watch them playing. During the third verse one of the polocrosse players throws the ball to another player but his aim is off and it lands at where the girls are sitting, Cathy picks it up and they playfully throw the ball to each other before the polocrosse players get it back. Soon afterwards, they leave the beach.

=== Track listing ===
No.	Title	Length
1.	"All I Want Is You"	3:40
2.	"Find My Way"	4:05
3.	"Each Step That I Take"

An enhanced version of the CD contains the video for "All I Want Is You".

=== Weekly charts ===
Chart (2002)	Peak position
Europe (Eurochart Hot 100)	65
Ireland (IRMA)	5
Netherlands (Single Top 100)	88
Switzerland (Schweizer Hitparade)	76
UK Singles (Official Charts)	18

=== Year-end charts ===
Chart (2002)	Position
Ireland (IRMA)	47

== Brian McFadden version ==
"All I Want is You"

Single by Brian McFadden featuring Ronan Keating

from the album The Irish Connection
- Released: February 25, 2013
- Genre: Pop rock
- Length: 3:53
- Label: BMF, Island
- Songwriters: U2 (music); Bono (lyrics)

Brian McFadden singles chronology
"Come Party / That's How Life Goes" (2011)	"All I Want is You" (2013)	"Time to Save Our Love" (2013)

Ronan Keating singles chronology
"Wasted Light" (2012)	"All I Want is You" (2013)

"All I Want Is You" was covered by Brian McFadden, an Irish musician formerly of Westlife, for his album The Irish Connection. The song features guest vocals from Ronan Keating, frontman of fellow Irish boyband Boyzone. It was released as a single on 25 February 2013.

=== Music video ===
The accompanying music video sees McFadden performing the track during a UK tour earlier this year. The video did not feature Ronan Keating.

== See also ==
- List of covers of U2 songs – All I Want Is You
