= Pieces of You =

Studio album by Jewel
- Released: February 28, 1995
- Studios: The Innerchange (San Diego, California); Broken Arrow Ranch (Redwood City, California)
- Genres: Folk; folk rock
- Length: 58:31
- Label: Atlantic
- Producer: Ben Keith

Jewel chronology
| Pieces of You (1995) | Spirit (1998) |

Singles from Pieces of You
- 1. "Who Will Save Your Soul" Released: April 23, 1996; 2. "You Were Meant for Me" Released: October 15, 1996; 3. "Foolish Games" Released: July 8, 1997; 4. "Morning Song" Released: January 9, 1998

Pieces of You is the debut studio album by American singer-songwriter Jewel, released on February 28, 1995, by Atlantic Records. It was produced by Ben Keith, who has also produced works for artists such as Neil Young and Patsy Cline. Featuring acoustic guitar-based songs written when Jewel was a teenager, the album is composed of both live recordings from 1994 at the Innerchange, a coffeehouse in San Diego, and studio recordings completed at Neil Young's personal studio in Redwood City, California.

After its release in February 1995, the album initially failed to chart. Two years later, in 1997, Bob Dylan invited Jewel to tour with him as his opening act, which gave the album widespread public exposure. The single "Who Will Save Your Soul" eventually received airplay, and the album peaked at number four on the US Billboard 200, almost exactly two years after its release. Other hits included were "Foolish Games" and "You Were Meant for Me", as well as the UK single "Morning Song". After two years, the album was re-released featuring the re-recorded versions of "You Were Meant for Me" and "Foolish Games". Despite a mixed critical response, the album is listed at number 64 of the "Definitive 200" by the Rock and Roll Hall of Fame.

Pieces of You was certified 12-times platinum by the Recording Industry Association of America (RIAA) on January 30, 2006, denoting shipments in excess of 12 million copies in the United States. As of June 2010, the album had sold over 7.3 million copies in the US, becoming one of the best-selling debut albums of all time.

On September 28, 2020, Jewel announced that the album would be re-released in celebration of the 25th anniversary of the album's release. It was released through Craft Recordings in multiple formats including the original album remastered, alongside a four-disc box set containing B-sides, demos, outtakes, and live performances of the album's songs.

== Background ==
The bulk of the songs featured on Pieces of You were written by Jewel between the ages of 16 and 19; she has said that "Who Will Save Your Soul" specifically was written while she was busking during a hitchhiking trip she took by herself over spring break from the Interlochen Center for the Arts, where she had been studying on a vocal scholarship.

While living in San Diego, California, Jewel managed to amass a local following while performing in coffee houses and local bars, which resulted in a bootleg being broadcast on 91X FM. Jewel then became subject of a bidding war between labels, eventually signing with Atlantic Records.

== Recording ==
Several tracks on Pieces of You were recorded live in 1994 at the Innerchange, a San Diego coffeehouse where Jewel was a regular performer. The remainder of the album was recorded in Neil Young's studio at Broken Arrow Ranch in Redwood City, California, under the supervision of producer Ben Keith. Jewel told Time about the recording process:

"[...] Typically I've had difficulty in the studio. I don't sing as raw, it's just a bit more tame. I'm a live singer who's always fed off the energy of the audience. In a studio, you're just looking at a wall—it feels very odd to me. I've been a live performer since I was six years old. The reason I recorded the album live with the band was so that I could play guitar, which I usually never do in the studio, while I sing at the same time. The band was accustomed to following singer-songwriters and feeling for me slowing down and speeding up. It has a real ebb and a flow and a naturalness that didn't inhibit my singing or performance."

In her 2015 memoir, Never Broken: Songs Are Only Half the Story, Jewel described Pieces of You as "imperfect, full of mistakes and guitar flubs", but also "honest".

== Reception ==
Professional ratings
Review scores
| Source | Rating |
|---|---|
| AllMusic | 4/5 stars |
| Entertainment Weekly | C+ |
| Q | 4/5 stars |
| The Rolling Stone Album Guide | 3/5 stars |
| The Village Voice | C− |

Upon its initial release in 1995, the album received little attention, after which Jewel was invited to tour as the opener for Bob Dylan, which helped garner more public attention. Two of the album's singles were re-recorded for a 1997 re-release of the album.

David Browne of Entertainment Weekly gave the album a negative review upon its 1997 re-release, noting, "Pieces of You remains a wimpily produced batch of songs – so ineffectual that both 'Who Will Save Your Soul?' and 'You Were Meant for Me' had to be rerecorded for release as singles. It's best considered as a guided tour through three decades of female folk-pop styles," comparing it negatively to Joni Mitchell and Kate Bush. Robert Christgau of The Village Voice also gave the album a starkly negative review, writing: "With the possible exception of Saint Joan, who at least had some stature, this is the bad folkie joke to end all bad folkie jokes."

Sara Sytsma of AllMusic gave the album a positive review, calling it "a charming collection of light alternative folk-rock from the teenage singer/songwriter. Her songs are occasionally naive, but her melodies can usually save her lyrics." In his review for AllMusic, Stephen Thomas Erlewine wrote: "Pieces of You is a charming debut that is somewhat undone by its own naïveté. Jewel has a rich voice and an innocent, beguiling charm that makes 'Who Will Save Your Soul,' 'I'm Sensitive,' and 'You Were Meant for Me' – songs with slight, simple lyrics and catchy, sweet melodies – quite endearing; they sound like a high-school diary brought to life. [...] Pieces of You has enough charm to make it an ingratiating debut, even if the album doesn't quite fulfill Jewel's potential."

== Track listing ==
All tracks are written by Jewel Kilcher, except where noted.

Original release
| No. | Title | Writer(s) | Length |
|---|---|---|---|
| 1. | "Who Will Save Your Soul" | | 4:00 |
| 2. | "Pieces of You" | | 4:15 |
| 3. | "Little Sister" | | 2:29 |
| 4. | "Foolish Games" | | 5:39 |
| 5. | "Near You Always" | | 3:08 |
| 6. | "Painters" | | 6:43 |
| 7. | "Morning Song" | | 3:35 |
| 8. | "Adrian" | Kilcher; Steve Poltz | 7:02 |
| 9. | "I'm Sensitive" | | 2:54 |
| 10. | "You Were Meant for Me" | Kilcher; Poltz | 4:13 |
| 11. | "Don't" | | 3:34 |
| 12. | "Daddy" | | 3:49 |
| 13. | "Angel Standing By" | | 2:38 |
| 14. | "Amen" | | 4:32 |
| Total length: | | | 58:31 |

Deluxe edition and 25th anniversary limited edition box set bonus tracks (disc 1)
| No. | Title | Writer(s) | Length |
|---|---|---|---|
| 15. | "You Were Meant for Me" (Album Edit) | Kilcher; Poltz | 3:48 |
| 16. | "Foolish Games" (Radio Edit) | | 4:02 |
| 17. | "Morning Song" (Radio Mix) | | 3:34 |
| 18. | "Angel Needs a Ride" | | 4:16 |
| 19. | "Everything Breaks" | | 3:17 |

Deluxe edition bonus tracks (disc 2)
| No. | Title | Writer(s) | Length |
|---|---|---|---|
| 1. | "1000 Miles Away" (Live) | | 4:08 |
| 2. | "She Cries" (Live) | | 4:40 |
| 3. | "Pointer" (Demo) | | 5:45 |
| 4. | "My Own Private God's Give to Women" | | 3:47 |
| 5. | "Race Car Driver" | | 4:50 |
| 6. | "Flower" (Live) | | 3:35 |
| 7. | "I'm Sensitive" (Live) | | 4:05 |
| 8. | "You Were Meant For Me" (Juan Patiño Version) | Kilcher; Poltz | 3:08 |
| 9. | "Cold Song" | | 1:02 |
| 10. | "Rocker Girl" | | 1:44 |
| 11. | "Emily" | | 3:10 |
| 12. | "Dance Between Two Women" | | 4:07 |
| 13. | "Quiet Warrior" | | 4:07 |
| 14. | "Walk Away" (Outtake) | | 3:38 |
| 15. | "See Sassy Wake Up" (Outtake) | | 3:01 |
| 16. | "Foolish Games" (No String Overdubs) | | 5:39 |
| 17. | "Angels Need A Ride" (Outtake) | | 5:39 |
| 18. | "Flower" (Outtake) | | 4:02 |
| 19. | "Race Car Driver" (Outtake) | | 4:56 |
| 20. | "Who Will Save Your Soul" (Unedited Master Take) | | 5:03 |

25th anniversary limited edition box set bonus tracks (disc 2)
| No. | Title | Writer(s) | Length |
|---|---|---|---|
| 1. | "Who Will Save Your Soul" (Demo) | | 3:08 |
| 2. | "Pieces of You" (Demo) | | 3:31 |
| 3. | "Little Sister" (Demo) | | 1:55 |
| 4. | "Foolish Games" (Demo) | | 6:09 |
| 5. | "Adrian" (Demo) | Kilcher; Poltz | 6:58 |
| 6. | "You Were Meant for Me" (Demo) | Kilcher; Poltz | 4:05 |
| 7. | "Near You Always" (Demo) | | 2:52 |
| 8. | "Painters" (Demo) | | 5:45 |
| 9. | "Don't" (Demo) | | 3:43 |
| 10. | "Daddy" (Demo) | | 3:54 |
| 11. | "Angel Standing" (Demo) | | 2:12 |
| 12. | "Amen" (Demo) | | 5:14 |
| 13. | "See Sassy Wake Up" (Demo) | | 2:58 |
| 14. | "His Pleasure Is My Pain" (Demo) | | 4:30 |
| 15. | "Down So Long" (Demo) | | 4:45 |
| 16. | "Sometimes It Be That Way" (Demo) | | 5:20 |
| 17. | "Nicotine Love" (Demo) | | 6:09 |
| 18. | "Tiny Love Spaces" (Demo) | | 4:13 |

25th anniversary limited edition box set bonus tracks (disc 3)
| No. | Title | Writer(s) | Length |
|---|---|---|---|
| 1. | "1000 Miles Away" (Live) | | 4:08 |
| 2. | "She Cries" (Live) | | 4:40 |
| 3. | "My Own Private God's Give to Women" (Live) | | 3:47 |
| 4. | "Race Car Driver" | | 4:50 |
| 5. | "Flower" (Live) | | 3:35 |
| 6. | "I'm Sensitive" (Live) | | 4:05 |
| 7. | "You Were Meant For Me" (Juan Patiño Version) | Kilcher; Poltz | 3:08 |
| 8. | "Cold Song" | | 1:02 |
| 9. | "Rocker Girl" | | 1:44 |
| 10. | "Emily" | | 3:10 |
| 11. | "Dance Between Two Women" | | 4:07 |
| 12. | "Quiet Warrior" | | 4:07 |
| 13. | "Walk Away" (Outtake) | | 3:38 |
| 14. | "See Sassy Wake Up" (Outtake) | | 3:01 |
| 15. | "Foolish Games" (No String Overdubs) | | 5:39 |
| 16. | "Angels Need A Ride" (Outtake) | | 5:39 |
| 17. | "Flower" (Outtake) | | 4:02 |
| 18. | "Race Car Driver" (Outtake) | | 4:56 |
| 19. | "Who Will Save Your Soul" (Unedited Master Take) | | 5:03 |
| 20. | "So Gott" (Live) | | 2:46 |

25th anniversary limited edition box set bonus tracks (disc 4)
| No. | Title | Length |
|---|---|---|
| 1. | "Who Will Save Your Soul" (Live) | 6:14 |
| 2. | "Pieces of You" (Live) | 4:04 |
| 3. | "Little Sister" (Live) | 2:34 |
| 4. | "Near You Always" (Live) | 3:40 |
| 5. | "Painters" (Live) | 7:17 |
| 6. | "Morning Song" (Live) | 5:32 |
| 7. | "Adrian" (Live) | 8:00 |
| 8. | "I'm Sensitive" (Live) | 3:08 |
| 9. | "Don't" (Live) | 4:04 |
| 10. | "Daddy" (Live) | 5:44 |
| 11. | "Angel Standing" (Live) | 4:27 |
| 12. | "Amen" (Live) | 4:52 |
| 13. | "Foolish Games" (Piano Demo) | 5:59 |
| 14. | "Quiet Warrior" (Live) | 6:53 |
| 15. | "Chime Bells (The Yodeling Song)" (Live) | 2:45 |

LP reissue bonus tracks (vinyl 2 side d)
| No. | Title | Length |
|---|---|---|
| 1. | "Emily" | 3:15 |
| 2. | "Rocker Girl" | 1:44 |
| 3. | "Everything Breaks" | 3:21 |
| 4. | "Cold Song" | 1:03 |
| 5. | "Angel Needs A Ride" | 4:17 |

== Personnel ==
Musicians

- Jewel Kilcher – vocals, guitar
- Robbie Buchanan – piano
- Oscar Butterworth – drums
- Charlotte Caffey – piano
- Tim Drummond – bass
- Mark Howard – bass
- Craig Young – bass
- Spooner Oldham – keyboards
- Kristin Wilkinson – strings

Technical personnel

- Ben Keith – production
- Tim Mulligan – production
- John Nowland – production
- John Dixon – engineering assistance
- John Hausmann – engineering assistance
- Gene Eichelberger – mixing
- Tim Mulligan – mixing
- John Nowland – mixing
- Joe Baldrige – mixing
- Tim Mulligan – mastering
- Jenny Price – A&R
- Gena Maria Rankins – production coordination
- Tim Mulligan – digital editing
- Charlotte Caffey – arrangements
- Jewel Kilcher – arrangements

Art personnel

- John Codling – art direction
- Hugh Hales-Tooke – photography

== Charts ==
=== Weekly charts ===
Weekly chart performance for Pieces of You
| Chart (1997–1998) | Peak position |
|---|---|
| Australian Albums (ARIA) | 5 |
| Austrian Albums (Ö3 Austria) | 30 |
| Belgian Albums (Ultratop Flanders) | 49 |
| Canada Top Albums/CDs (RPM) | 2 |
| Canadian Albums (Billboard) | 2 |
| Dutch Albums (Album Top 100) | 12 |
| European Albums (Music & Media) | 42 |
| French Albums (SNEP) | 69 |
| German Albums (Offizielle Top 100) | 19 |
| New Zealand Albums (RMNZ) | 1 |
| Norwegian Albums (VG-lista) | 5 |
| Spanish Albums (AFYVE) | 23 |
| Swedish Albums (Sverigetopplistan) | 20 |
| UK Albums (Official Charts) | 82 |
| US Billboard 200 | 4 |
| US Top Catalog Albums (Billboard) | 4 |

=== Year-end charts ===
1996 year-end chart performance for Pieces of You
| Chart (1996) | Position |
|---|---|
| US Billboard 200 | 58 |

1997 year-end chart performance for Pieces of You
| Chart (1997) | Position |
|---|---|
| Australian Albums (ARIA) | 7 |
| New Zealand Albums (RMNZ) | 4 |
| US Billboard 200 | 5 |

1998 year-end chart performance for Pieces of You
| Chart (1998) | Position |
|---|---|
| Australian Albums (ARIA) | 41 |
| Dutch Albums (Album Top 100) | 38 |
| US Billboard 200 | 63 |

=== Decade-end charts ===
Decade-end chart performance for Pieces of You
| Chart (1990–1999) | Position |
|---|---|
| US Billboard 200 | 35 |

== Certifications and sales ==
Certifications and sales for Pieces of You
| Region | Certification | Certified units/sales |
|---|---|---|
| Australia (ARIA) | 6× Platinum | 420,000^{^} |
| Canada (Music Canada) | 8× Platinum | 800,000^{^} |
| Japan | — | 60,000 |
| Netherlands (NVPI) | Platinum | 100,000^{^} |
| New Zealand (RMNZ) | Platinum | 15,000^{^} |
| Norway (IFPI Norway) | Gold | 25,000^{*} |
| Spain (Promusicae) | Gold | 50,000^{^} |
| United Kingdom (BPI) | Gold | 100,000^{^} |
| United States (RIAA) | 12× Platinum | 8,753,000 (Note: As of June 2010, Pieces of You had sold 7,353,000 copies in the United States according to Nielsen SoundScan, with an additional 1.4 million sold at BMG Music Club. Nielsen SoundScan does not count albums sold through clubs like the BMG Music Service, which were significantly popular in the 1990s.) |
Summaries
| Worldwide | — | 12,000,000 |
^{*} Sales figures based on certification alone.^{^} Shipments figures based on certification alone.

== See also ==
- List of best-selling albums in the United States
