= After the Rain (Bellefire album) =

Studio album by Bellefire
- Released: October 2001 (JP); 27 April 2004 (EU)
- Genre: Pop
- Length: 56:47
- Label: Toshiba EMI Japan
- Producers: Paul Staveley O'Duffy; Richard Stannard; Julian Gallagher; Steve Kipner; Andrew Frampton; Jörgen Elofsson; Mathias Venge; Evan Rogers; Carl Sturken; Trevor Steel; John Holliday; David Eriksen; Denis Woods; Rhett Lawrence

Bellefire chronology
After the Rain (2001)	Spin the Wheel (2004)

After the Rain is the debut studio album by Irish girl group Bellefire, released in 2001. It was prevented from being widely released in 2002 by Virgin Records's sudden decision to axe the group. This was in spite of the recent success of their single "All I Want Is You". By that time, the album had only been released in Japan.

The album achieved some success in Japan and spawned the 3 singles, "Perfect Bliss", "Buzzstyle (Find My Way)" and "All I Want Is You".

Although not received outside Japan, the European version of the album was to include new tracks.

== Track listing ==
No.	Title	Length
1.	"Perfect Bliss"
2.	"I Wish I Could But I Can't"
3.	"Anywhere Anytime"
4.	"Buzzstyle (Find My Way)"
5.	"Surrender"
6.	"Get You Out Of My Mind"
7.	"I Can Make You Fall In Love Again"
8.	"All the Money in the World"
9.	"Don't Let Me Down"
10.	"The Flame"
11.	"If Living is Without You"
12.	"Each Step That I Take"
13.	"Tell Me Now"
14.	"All I Want Is You"

== Other ==
Bellefire co-wrote 4 of the tracks on the album: Find My Way, Surrender, Don't Let Me Down and If Living Is Without You.

Upon European promotion, Bellefire would regularly perform the track Surrender.

Several songs were recorded for the European release of the album. Confirmed songs:

1. "Got Me by the Heart"
2. "I Hope You Dance"
3. "Light My Fire/ Superstar"
4. "Turnaround"
5. "Don't Leave the Light On"
6. "For You" (rumoured)

"I Hope You Dance" is a cover of the Lee Ann Womack song. The band stated that the song was very uptempo and included wah-wah guitars. The song was later recorded by Ronan Keating.

"Light My Fire/Superstar" was their own acapella harmony version of Lauryn Hill's song, 'Superstar'. Both "Light My Fire /Superstar" and "I Hope You Dance" were both performed live at Leicester Square in April 2002. Turnaround was recorded by Westlife and is the title track of their album.
