= Bellefire =

Irish girl group

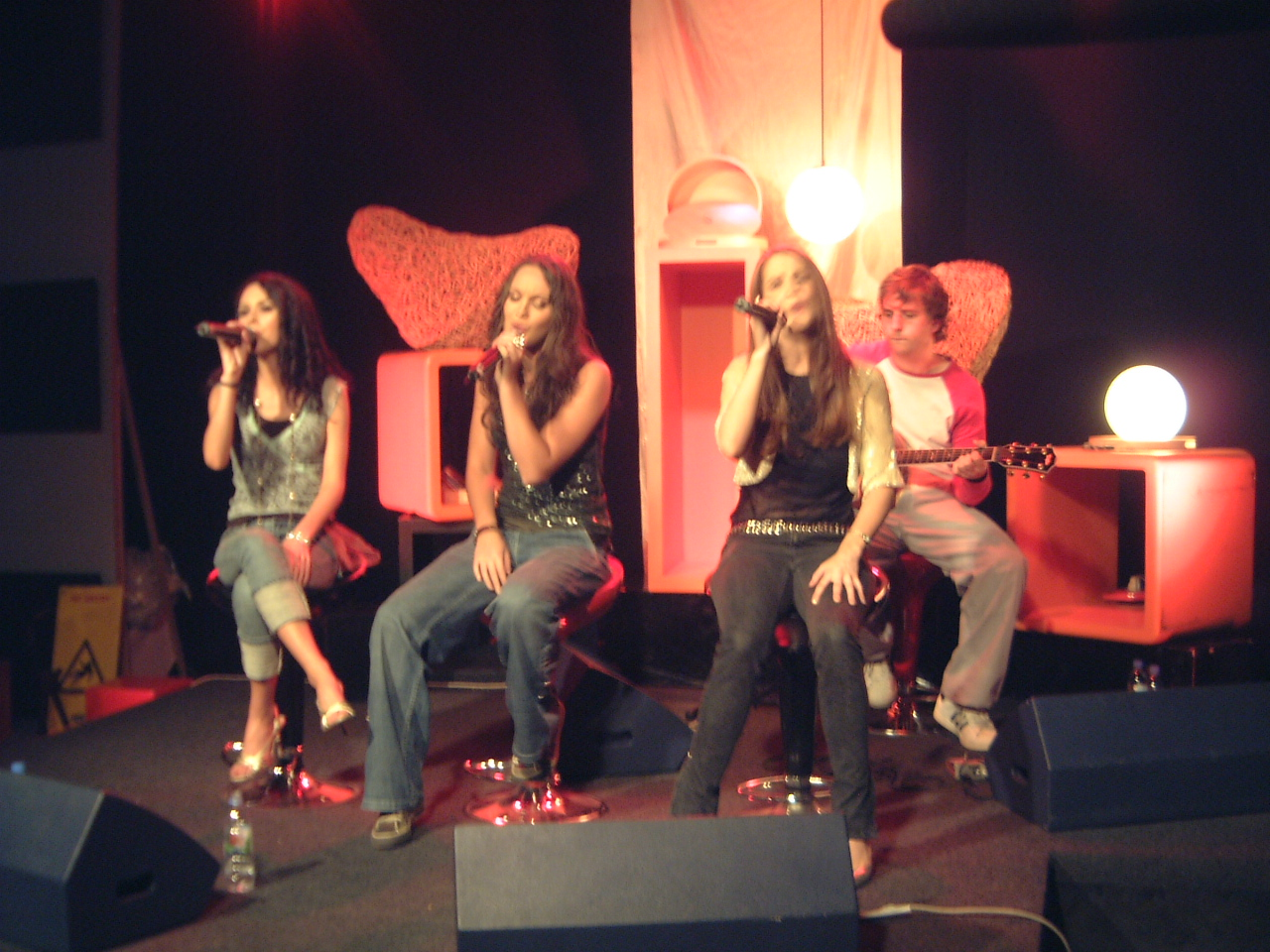

Background information
- Also known as: Chit Chat
- Origin: Ireland
- Genre: Pop
- Years active: 1999–2004
- Labels: Virgin Records (2000–2002); East West Records (WEA) (2003); Atlantic Records (2004)
- Members: Kelly Kilfeather; Cathy Newell; Ciara Newell; Tara Lee; Paula O'Neill
- Website: BellefireMusic.com

Bellefire were an Irish girl group, best known for their 2002 cover of the U2 song "All I Want Is You". The original line-up consisted of Kelly Kilfeather (born 23 March 1979), Tara Lee (born 25 July 1982), Cathy Newell (born 14 July 1982) and Ciara Newell (born 7 July 1983). Tara Lee left the group in 2002. They mostly performed pop and adult contemporary music. Outside Southeast Asia and their native Ireland, they have received minimal recognition, although they did experience minor success in the United Kingdom with their singles.

== History ==
They first formed in 1999 (see 1999 in music), at an audition organised by Louis Walsh and John Reynolds, the management team behind Boyzone. Walsh and Reynolds' goal was to form a male/female mixed group. According to the Irish Independent, Walsh was disappointed with the standard of male entrants and opted to sign a girl group instead. The intention was to aim towards "a more mature niche in the pop market" than what was becoming the norm for vocal groups at the time. The line-up was chosen with the inclusion of a fifth member called Paula O'Neill. They performed for the first time under the name 'Chit Chat' as a support act to Boyzone's Point Depot concerts in January 2000, after Paula O'Neill left the group. The four remaining members signed a recording contract with Virgin Records as 'Bellefire' later that year.

Their first single, "Perfect Bliss" was released in June 2001 and reached No.2 in the Irish charts earning double platinum certification and No.18 in the UK. It also began to pick up heavy airplay in Japan reaching the top spot of the Japanese international music charts with the girls jetting off to Japan for a 3 month promotional tour. During this time, they finished recording their debut album 'After The Rain' which was released exclusively in Japan in October of 2001. To promote the album, they collaborated with Japanese artist Hitomi Yaida; re-writing English lyrics for Yaida's hit song Buzzstyle which they performed with her on Japanese TV & in a televised concert. They subsequently released Buzzstyle (Find My Way) as a double A-Side single with their cover of U2's 'All I Want Is You' in the Japanese market.

After a short break, Bellefire turned their attention back to the European market and recorded a new music in Ireland for their 2nd European single "All I Want Is You". The track received a lot of airplay and got them a performance slot on Top of the Pops as well as being Radio 2's Single of the Week. The single went onto reach No.5 in Ireland and No.18 in the UK. While en route to record their performance for Top of the Pops, the group were informed that they were being dropped by their record company. Changes at Virgin meant new management at the label who had not worked with the band before, decided that Bellefire along with many other artists on the label were to be dropped. Shortly after this news, Tara decided to leave the group and the remaining members decided to continue on as a trio. The European version of their album contained several new songs including 'Got Me By The Heart', 'Turnaround' and 'I Hope You Dance' and remains officially unreleased. Each of these songs found new life in later years with other artists such as Westlife and Ronan Keating. Undeterred, Ciara, Cathy and Kelly continued as Bellefire, signing a new record deal with WEA in 2003 and moved their base to London. They subsequently recorded a new album entitled Spin the Wheel.

Their first single as a trio was "Say Something Anyway" with the music video shot in Cuba. The single went onto peak at No.5 in Ireland and No.26 in the UK. The planned follow-up single was to be "You Were Meant for Me", a cover of the Jewel track with the music video shot in Miami. However the single was shelved with no explanation given. Bellefire spent the summer of 2004 promoting their new music and album release around the UK at various festivals, but due to the album and single being continually pushed back, the summer promotion did little to boost their reputation and sales. 6 months after the release of Say Something Anyway, the girls finally released a follow-up single, the title track "Spin the Wheel" in October 2004. The track failed to make the top 20 in Ireland and missed the top 40 entirely in the UK. Bellefire once again concentrated on the Asian market, where "Say Something Anyway" was reaching the top of the charts in countries such as Thailand, Malaysia, Indonesia and The Philippines. They completed their tour of Southeast Asia and released their album there. The UK release of the Spin the Wheel album and a third single was pushed back several times until it was eventually cancelled.

After the non-release of the "Spin the Wheel" album in the UK, Bellefire and Atlantic Records parted company, and the group went their separate ways.

Ciara Newell was credited as a backing vocalist for Blue member Lee Ryan's solo album in 2005, and also performed on the soundtrack for RTÉ drama, Showbands. In 2010, she was involved with the Irish language television station, TG4, where she worked as a judge on the 4th series of its flagship talent show, Glas Vegas. The series began airing on TG4 in early 2010. Ciara now works at Universal Music Group in London as a Song plugger.

Cathy Newell was a judge on the 2005 Irish television show Star Stream Final.

Kelly Kilfeather began working with independent studio Little Tardis but no material ever materialised from these sessions.

Paula O'Neill, who departed the group before they became known as Bellefire, is now a wedding singer. She appeared as a contestant on episode five of the third series of reality talent show The Voice of Ireland which aired on 2 February 2014. Paula performed a Pink song Who Knew in front of judges, Dolores O'Riordan, Kian Egan, Jamelia and Bressie. However, none of the 4 judges turned their chair for her.

In January 2017, 3 tracks from the band's unreleased debut album were leaked onto the Internet.

== Discography ==
=== Albums ===
Year	Album details
2001	After the Rain: Released: October 2001 (Japan); Label: Toshiba EMI Japan
2004	Spin the Wheel: Released: July 2004; Label: EastWest Records

=== Singles ===
Year	Title	Chart positions				Album
Year	Title	IRE	NL	SWI	UK	Album
2001	"Perfect Bliss"	2	—	34	18	After the Rain
2001	"Buzzstyle (Find My Way)" ^{A}	—	—	—	—	After the Rain
2002	"All I Want Is You"	5	88	76	18	After the Rain
2004	"Say Something Anyway"	5	—	—	26	Spin the Wheel
2004	"You Were Meant for Me" ^{B}	—	—	—	—	Spin the Wheel
2004	"Spin the Wheel"	21	—	—	67	Spin the Wheel

Notes

- ^{A} Song was exclusively released in Japan only.
- ^{B} European release of the song was cancelled, but it was released in Asia.

== Unreleased songs ==
A list of known unreleased songs

- "Got Me by the Heart"
- "I Hope You Dance"
- "Turnaround"
- "Light My Fire"
- "Don't Leave The Light On"
- "For You" (rumour)
