= Despierta =

2006 song performed by Edurne

Single by Edurne

from the album Edurne
- Released: 2006
- Genre: Pop, rock
- Length: 3:03
- Label: Sony BMG
- Songwriters: Adam Alvermark, Gustav Efraimsson, Andreas Karlgård
- Producer: Adam Alvermark

Edurne singles chronology
"Despierta" (2006)	"Amores Dormidos" (2006)

"Despierta" (English: Wake Up) was the first single from Edurne's debut album, Edurne. Gustav Efraimsson, a Swedish songwriter/producer, co-wrote the song. The original title is "Erase delete be gone now" (listen song). The song was a huge success on radios while the CD Maxi single peaked at number 5 in the Spanish charts and sold more than 5,000 copies.

== Track listing ==
1. "Despierta" (Album Version) - 2:58
2. "Despierta" (David Penn Remix) (Radio Edit) - 3:24
3. "Despierta" (Caimillu Remix) - 3:56
4. "Despierta" (David Penn Remix) (Extended) - 6:39

== Charts ==
Chart (2005/2006)	Peak Position
Promusicae Top 20 Singles (Spain)	5
Cadena 100 (Spain)	13
Los40 (Spain)	30

Promusicae Top 20 Singles (Spain)
Week	1	2	3	4
Chart position	5	7	14	out

Cadena 100 (Spain)
Week	1	2	3	4	5	6	7	8	9	10	11	12	13	14	15	16	17	18	19
Chart position	40	40	42	40	39	36	36	34	28	22	19	17	13	28	28	27	24	39	out

Los40 (Spain)
Week	1	2	3	4
Chart position	30	34	34	out
