= Spin the Wheel (song) =

2004 single by Bellefire

Single by Bellefire

from the album Spin the Wheel
- B-side: "Not Letting Go"
- Released: October 2004
- Recorded: 2004
- Genre: Pop
- Length: 3:11
- Label: EastWest Records
- Songwriters: Boyowa "Yoyo" Olugbo; Henry Binns; Tina Dickow
- Producer: Boo Dan Production

Bellefire singles chronology
| "You Were Meant for Me" (2004) | "Spin the Wheel" (2004) |

"Spin the Wheel" is a single by the Irish girl group Bellefire. It is the title track from their second album.

== Track listing - CD1 ==
1. "Spin the Wheel"
2. "Not Letting Go" (Non-album track)

== Track listing - CD2 ==
1. "Spin the Wheel"
2. "Spin the Wheel" (Groovefinder edit)
3. "All I Want Is You" (Live acoustic)

CD2 also includes the video for "Spin the Wheel", plus a 'Behind the Scenes' documentary about the making of the video.

== Charts ==
| Chart (2004) | Peak position |
|---|---|
| Ireland (IRMA) | 21 |
| UK Singles (Official Charts) | 67 |
