= Geoff Moore (photographer) =

American photographer

Geoff Moore (born November 17, 1970, in Pasadena, California) is an American photographer and director based in Los Angeles, California. He has become known for creating classic cinematic imagery with contemporary innovation. He has directed and photographed ad campaigns for Coach, T-Mobile, Facebook, Diesel, among many others. He has photographed for magazines such as GQ Magazine, Elle Magazine, and Playboy, and shot such celebrities as Norman Reedus, Red Hot Chili Peppers, Heidi Klum, Aaron Paul, and fellow Los Angeles artist Alex Prager. He has also directed numerous music videos for such artists as Jewel and The Cardigans.

Moore's latest fine art show "California Dreamin' " took place at House Of Fangs Gallery on Melrose St. in Los Angeles and featured 55 black and white images. His last show "Endoresement" at KM Fine Arts in West Hollywood was called a "Best in the Art World" by Artnet, with worldwide press from magazines such as Esquire, Another, I-D, Interview, Vice, and others. Moore's fine art work was also recently featured amongst the likes of Damien Hirst, Richard Prince, William Eggleston, Jeff Koons, Ed Ruscha, and others in a show curated by Flea, the Gagosian Gallery, and DLK at a show benefiting Flea's (The Red Hot Chili Peppers) music foundation the Silverlake Conservatory Of Music (2014 thru 2019). Early 2015 his work was showcased at Art CoIogne by Kaune Sposnik Gallery (Germany). Moore's work has three times been chosen by American Photo as a "Photo of the Year" to be a part of their prestigious permanent archive (Alex Prager/2012, Val Keil for Playboy/2013, Sara Cummings/Serengeti Eyewear 2019). In 2011, Moore was featured in a massive outdoor art show in Hollywood with artist Alex Prager, curated by the Lucie Foundation, called "Facing West- Fashion in the Land of Celluloid." Qvest Magazine of Germany recently did a 16-page spread and "conversation" with Moore and Prager. A self-taught visual artist, Moore regularly shoots many of the top faces in pop culture, advertisements, as well as his award-winning fine art.

== Exhibitions ==
- " California Dreamin' " - House Of Fangs, Los Angeles. Feb. (2020)
- Art Basel Miami - KM Fine Arts (2017)
- Art Basel Miami - KM Fine Arts (2016)
- "ENDORSEMENT – The UNSEEN COBAIN Photos"- KM Fine Arts – Los Angeles, CA (2016)
- Silverlake Conservatory of Music group show curated by Gagosian Gallery and Flea w/ Jeff Koons, Damien Hirst, Richard Prince, Ed Ruscha, Dana Louise Kirkpatrick – Los Angeles (2015 thru 2022)
- Art Cologne – Kaune, Posnik, Spohr Gallery, Germany (2015)
- Silverlake Conservatory of Music Group show w/ Damien Hirst, William Eggleston, Inez and Vinoodh, Richard Prince, Shepard Fairey – Ron Burkle Estate – Beverly Hills, CA (2014)
- "Facing West – Fashion in the Land of Celluloid" w/ Alex Prager. Curated by the Lucie Foundation and Jessie Cowan, Hollywood, CA
- "Intersecting Viewpoints" – Fluxco Gallery w/ Patrick Hoelck and others. – Los Angeles
- "Fovea" Group Show Fluxco Gallery – Los Angeles, CA
- MTV Group Show Pacific Design Center – West Hollywood, CA
- MTV/MVPA Group Show Pacific Design Center – West Hollywood, CA
- "Skatistan" Group Benefit Show – Nomad Gallery – Los Angeles, CA

== Notable videos ==
=== Commercials ===
- Diesel
- Converse
- Levis
- T-Mobile

=== Music ===
- "Lovefool"-The Cardigans.
- "Name"-Goo Goo Dolls.
- "Who Will Save Your Soul"-Jewel.
- "Strangers"- Sean and Zander
- "Retablo" – Sean and Zander
- "Book and a Cover" – Suzanne Vega
- "Zip Gun Bop" – Royal Crown Revue
- "Leave It Alone"- NOFX
- "Take On Me" – Reel Big Fish
- "Hey Leonardo (She Likes Me For Me)" – Blessid Union of Souls

== Recognition ==
Twice nominated as Director of The Year at the Billboard and MVPA Awards by the age 25.

=== Photography ===
- American Photo – "Photo of the Year" (2012).
- American Photo – "Photo of the Year" (2013)
- American Photo – "Photo of the Year" (2019)

=== Directing ===
- MTV Video Music Awards – Best Female Video nominee – "Who Will Save Your Soul"-Jewel (1996)
- MTV Video Music Awards – Best New Artist nominee-"Who Will Save Your Soul"-Jewel (1996)
- Rock Video of the Year MVPA Awards nominee – "Get 'em Outta Here" – Sprung Monkey Hollywood records
- Video of the Year MTV Europe Awards nominee – "Lovefool" -The Cardigans – Mercury records
- Director Of The Year nominee – MVPA Awards – Jewel "Who Will Save Your Soul" (1996)

== Press ==
1. Rolling Stone Kurt Cobain's Personal Archive: See Intimate Photos From New Exhibit
2. AnOther Mag Kurt Cobain's Secret Treasures Laid Bare
3. ArtNews Net The Best and Worst of the Art World This Week in One Minute
4. HYPEBEAST These Photos of Kurt Cobain's Personal Treasures Are Intimate and Haunting
5. W Magazine See the Unseen Kurt Cobain
6. Slate Magazine The Things Kurt Cobain Left Behind
7. V Magazine KURT COBAIN ARCHIVE IMAGES TO SHOW IN NEW EXHIBIT
8. Huffington Post Kurt Cobain to John Baldessari: Exhibitions to Check Out in L.A. This February
9. VICE I-D New Kurt Cobain Photo Exhibit Takes A Look into His Personal World
10. Esquire 10 'Unseen' Photos of Kurt Cobain's Personal Possessions
11. ArtNet News See Kurt Cobain's Most-Prized Possessions in New Show at KM Fine Arts
12. LA Weekly Geoff Moore's Photos of Kurt Cobain's Stuff Will Give You Goosebumps
13. Yahoo Music Endorsement: The Unseen Cobain Photos
14. L'Oeil de la Photographie Los Angeles: Charles R. Cross, Cobain Unseen
15. The Wild Magazine "WILD PROFILE: GEOFF FOR PREZ!", October 27, 2011
16. Dazed and Confused Magazine "Alex Prager shot by Geoff Moore", 2013
17. Superlative Conspiracy "Superlative Conspiracy No.4", Fall 2012
18. Superlative Conspiracy "Superlative Conspiracy No.5!", 2012
19. WeSC WeSC: Footwear Campaign, Spring 2013
20. Entertainment Weekly"Jewel's 'Pieces of You': How the 'Who Will Save Your Soul' video ended up in the bathroom", February 23, 2015
21. Anthony Kiedis Attends Geoff Moore Art Show "Anthony Kiedis at Photography Display", March 7, 2015
22. Silverlake Conservatory Benefit, Appleford, Steve – November 3, 2014
23. FLAUNT Magazine "ALEX AND VANESSA PRAGER: Film by Geoff Moore" September 7, 2013
24. FLAUNT Magazine "ALEX AND VANESSA PRAGER: That Which Is Intuited, That Which Is Self-Evident" Photographer, September 4, 2013
25. Juxtapoz Magazine, "Vanessa Prager", March 2015
26. Qvest Magazine "MAGAZINE # 56", Summer 2013
27. AI-AP American Photo: Photo of the Year Permanent Collection, 2012
28. AI-AP American Photo: Photo of the Year Permanent Collection, 2013
29. AI-AP American Photo: Photo of the Year Permanent Collection, 2019
30. "California Dreamin'" / Geoff Moore – Trendland 2019
