= Edurne =

Spanish singer (born 1985)

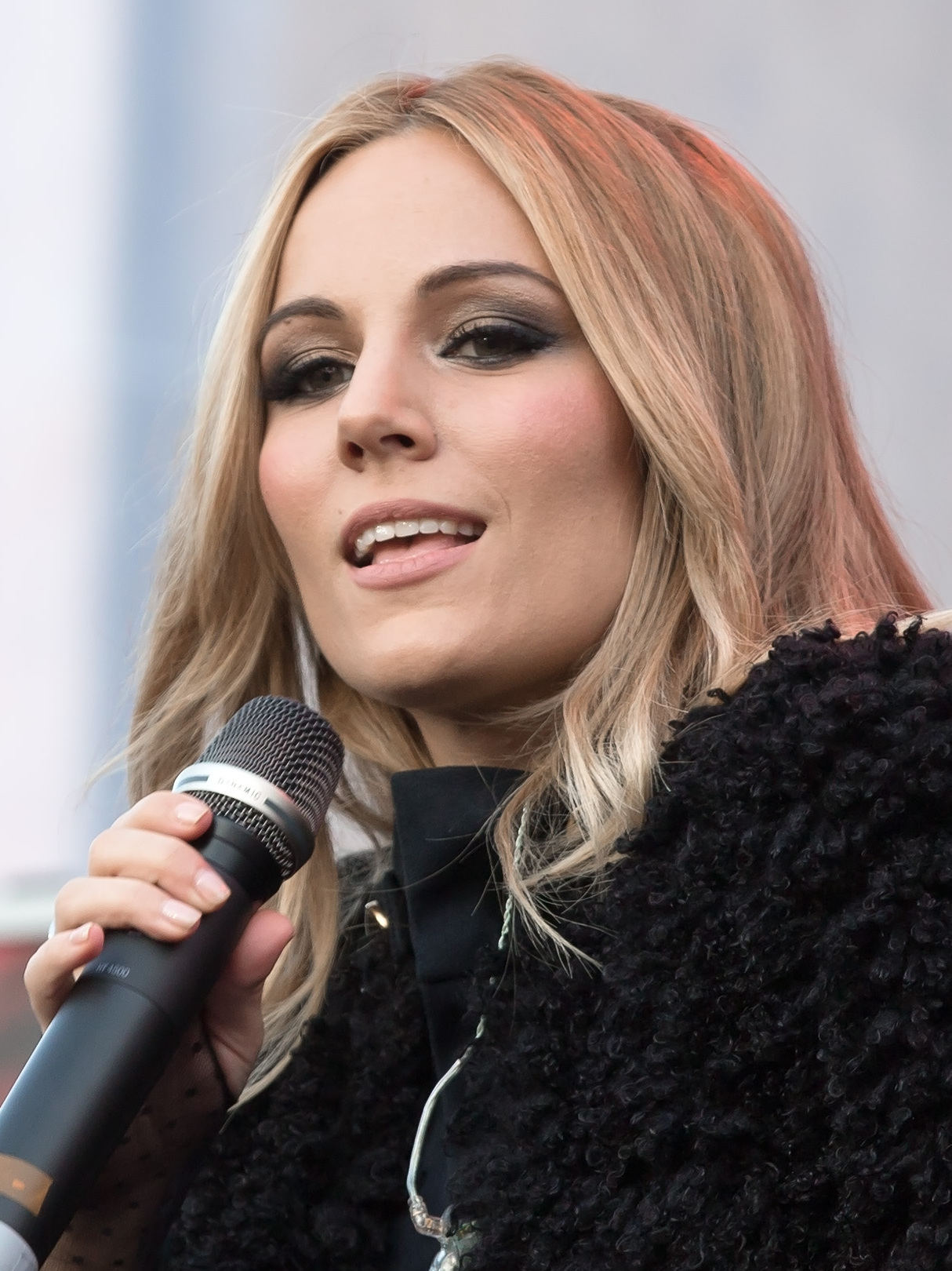
- Edurne in 2015
- Born: Edurne García Almagro; 22 December 1985 (age 40); Madrid, Spain
- Occupations: Singer; actress; TV personality; model
- Years active: 2005–present
- Spouse: David de Gea (m. 2023)
- Children: 1
- Musical career
- Genres: pop; rock; electropop; synthpop; dance; dance-pop
- Website: edurnity.com

Edurne García Almagro (Spanish pronunciation: [eˈðuɾne ɣaɾˈθia alˈmaɣɾo]; born 22 December 1985), known mononymously as Edurne, is a Spanish singer, actress, and television presenter. She rose to fame in late 2005 when she took part in the Spanish casting show Operación Triunfo on Telecinco and finished in sixth place in 2006. She represented Spain in the Eurovision Song Contest 2015 with the song "Amanecer" where she finished in 21st place.

== Biography ==
=== Early life ===
Edurne García Almagro was born on 22 December 1985 in the capital of Madrid, Spain. She started attending auditions as a child. At the age of 9, she became a member of the children's music group Trastos. She also had a child's minor roles in Spanish TV series like Hospital central (2002) or Ana y los 7 (2003). In late 2005, Edurne auditioned for the fourth series of Operación Triunfo, where she was selected by the show's jury. She was eliminated in the 12th live show, finishing in sixth place in early 2006.

=== Career ===
Edurne embarked on a music career with Sony BMG Spain and released her first studio album, called Edurne in 2006, which spawns the single "Despierta" that debuted in the fifth position on the Spanish Singles Charts, "Amores Dormidos", and "Te Falta Veneno", which were the soundtrack for the Spanish telenovela Yo soy bea and both reached the top twenty in Edurne's native country. 2007 saw the release of Edurne's second studio album, called Ilusión, which produced two singles. "Ven Por Mí" reached, as the album's lead single, the top twenty in the Spanish Dance iTunes Chart. Edurne released her third album Première on 4 June 2008, with the lead single being "Un Poco de Amor" (Spanish version of Queen's "Somebody to Love)". "Sigo Enamorada de Ti" (Spanish version of "Hopelessly Devoted To You") and "Tú serás para mí" (Spanish version of "You're The One That I Want") were the following singles.

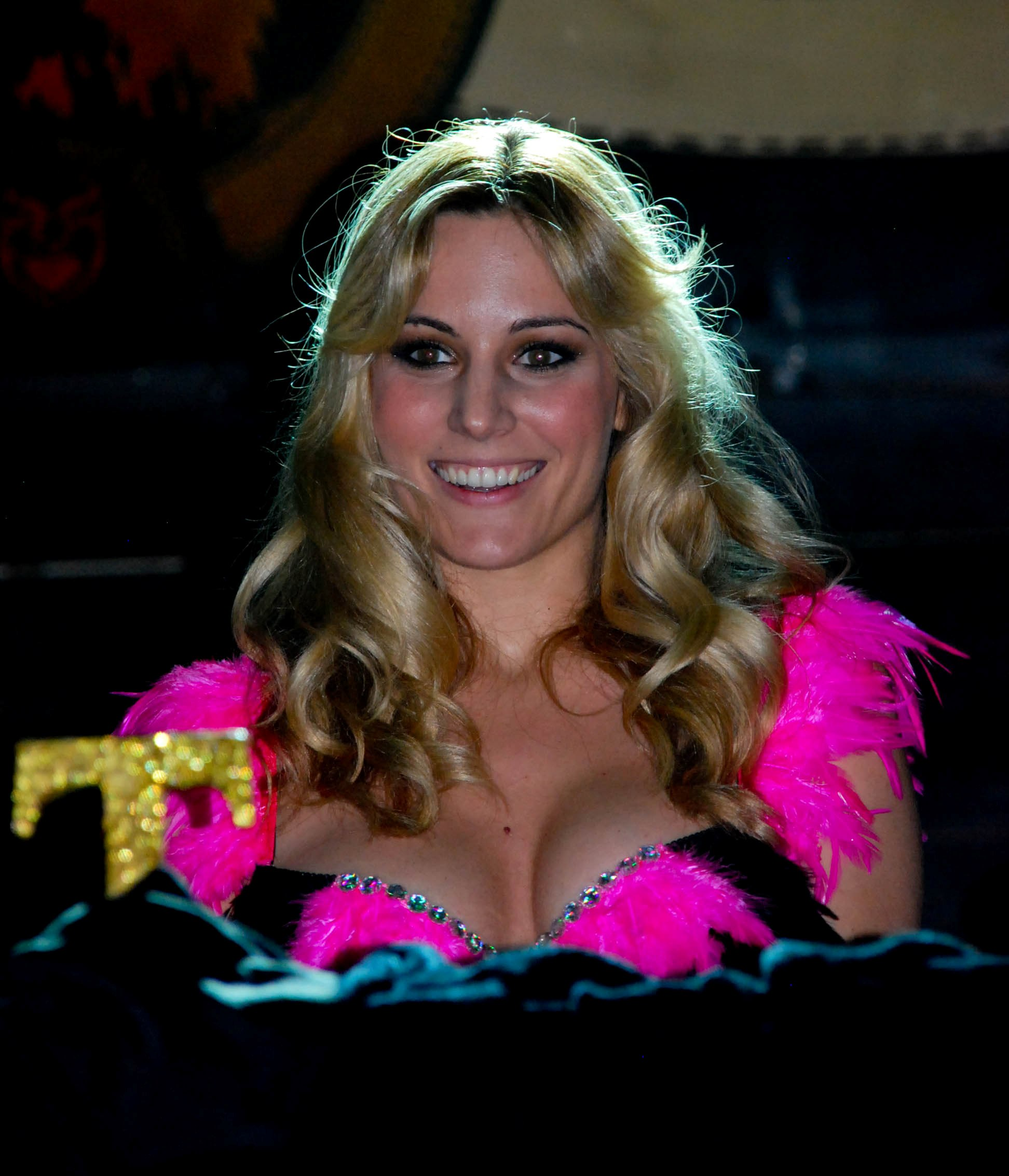
Edurne performing with Spanish DJ Brian Cross in Granada

Both are songs from Grease, because of Edurne's role as "Sandy" in the stage production Grease, El Musical de tu Vida from 2007 to 2013.

Edurne's fourth studio album Nueva Piel was released in 2010. It produced the two singles "Soy Como Soy" and "Oigo Mi Corazón"; both achieved moderate success on the Spanish charts. Edurne joined the cast of ¡Más Que Baile!, the Spanish version of Strictly Come Dancing, where she took second place in the final.

Edurne released her fifth studio album Climax on 24 September 2013, with the lead single "Pretty Boy", which went straight to number thirty-three on Del 40 al 1 chart, a hit list on the most important Spanish music radio Los 40 Principales. "Pankiller" was selected to be the second single and the music video became popular very fast in social networks because of the comparisons with US popstars Rihanna, Lady Gaga, and Madonna. In 2013, Edurne joined the cast of the third season of Tu Cara Me Suena, a Spanish show where celebrities impersonate singers for charity, where she also was proclaimed the winner with 60% of popular votes with her Christina Aguilera impersonation and her song "Hurt" in the show's finale. From June to December 2014, Edurne presented the comedy show Todo va bien, along with Xavi Rodríguez, on Cuatro.

On 14 January 2015, TVE announced the internal selection of Edurne to represent Spain in the Eurovision Song Contest 2015 with the song "Amanecer". In the final of the contest, which took place in Vienna on 23 May 2015, the song finished 21st overall out of 27, scoring 15 points. "Amanecer" is included in Edurne's sixth studio album Adrenalina, which was released on 16 June 2015. Adrenalina debuted at number six on the Spanish Albums Chart is 5 August 2015, it was announced Edurne would be joining Got Talent España (Spanish version of Got Talent) as one of the four judges.

In September 2016, Edurne recorded and released a video of the song "Taste the Feeling", a Coca-Cola campaign for the Spanish-speaking world.

On 31 October 2018, it was announced Edurne would be joining the cast of the daytime soap opera Servir y Proteger.

On 24 April 2019, Edurne released her first single in four years, titled "Demasiado Tarde", which features Carlos Baute and precedes her seventh studio album.

In September 2019, it was announced Edurne would be joining the talent show Idol Kids (part of the Idols franchise) as one of the three judges.

In 2025, Edurne became a coach on the tenth season of La Voz Kids. She returned for the eleventh season in 2026.

== Personal life ==
Edurne has been in a relationship with Spanish football goalkeeper David de Gea since 2010, with whom she had her daughter Yanay on 4 March 2021. On 1 July 2023, the couple married in Menorca.

== Awards ==
During her music career Edurne has earned one 40 Principales Award nomination.

== Discography ==
=== Studio albums ===
Title	Details	Peak chart positions	Certifications
Title	Details	SPA	Certifications
Edurne	Released: 21 March 2006; Formats: CD, digital download; Label: Sony BMG	3	SPA: Platinum
Ilusión	Released: 19 June 2007; Formats: CD, digital download; Label: Sony BMG	13	
Première	Released: 3 June 2008; Formats: CD, digital download; Label: Sony BMG	39	
Nueva piel	Released: 23 March 2010; Formats: CD, digital download; Label: Sony Music	16	
Climax	Released: 23 September 2013; Formats: CD, digital download; Label: Sony Music	22	
Adrenalina	Released: 16 June 2015; Formats: CD, digital download; Label: Sony Music	6	
Catarsis	Released: 23 June 2020; Formats: CD, digital download; Label: Sony Music	3	
Navidad Junto a Ti	Released: 21 November 2025; Formats: digital download; Label: Must! Production		

=== Other albums ===
- BSO Grease, el musical de tu vida (2008)
- BSO Grease, el musical (2011)

=== Singles ===
==== As lead artist ====
Title	Year	Peak chart positions	Album
Title	Year	SPA	Album
"Despierta"	2006	5	Edurne
"Amores Dormidos"	2006	—	Edurne
"Te Falta Veneno"	2006	—	Edurne
"No Quiero Más"	2007	—	Ilusión
"Ven Por Mí"	2007	—	Ilusión
"Fue Para Los Dos"	2007	—	Ilusión
"Un Poco de Amor"	2008	—	Première
"Sigo Enamorada de Ti"	2008	—	Première
"Tú Serás Para Mí" (featuring Carlos Solano)	2009	—	Première
"Soy CSoy"	2010	—	Nueva Piel
"Oigo Mi Corazón"	2011	—	Nueva Piel
"Pretty Boy"	2013	—	Climax
"Painkiller"	2014	—	Climax
"Amanecer"	2015	20	Adrenalina
"Basta"	2015	—	Adrenalina
"Demasiado Tarde" (featuring Carlos Baute)	2019	—	Catarsis
"Tal Vez"	2020	—	Catarsis
"Como tú"	2020	—	Catarsis
"Yanay"	2021	—	Non-album single
"Va Por Ti"	2024	—	Non-album single
"Mirame"	2024	—	Non-album single
"La Playlist"	2024	—	Non-album single
"Baila con el Viento"	2025	—	Non-album single
"Todo Me Recuerda a Ti"	2025	—	Non-album single
"Blanca Navidad" (with Pastora Soler)	2025	—	Non-album single
"No se Me da Bien Odiarte" (with Leire Martinez])	2025	—	Non-album single
"—" denotes a single that did not chart or was not released.

==== As featured artist ====
Title	Year	Peak chart positions	Album
Title	Year	SPA	Album
"Don't Tell Me Tonight" (Cameron Cartio featuring Edurne)	2006	—	Borderless
"Colgando en tus manos" (José Mota featuring Edurne)	2010	—	Voces X1Fin: Juntos Por Mali
"25 De Diciembre" (David de Gea featuring Edurne)	2010	—	Los Sims 3 Solidarios
"Por El Mar" (Miguel Costas featuring Edurne)	2011	—	Costas is Back
"Que Güeno Que Estoy" (Mojinos Escozíos featuring Edurne)	2011	—	Mená chatruá
"More Than A Lover" (Brian Cross featuring Edurne)	2012	—	Non-album single
"Hand on Heart" (Olly Murs featuring Edurne)	2013	46	Right Place Right Time
"Jaque al rey" (Belén Aguilera featuring Edurne)	2019	—	Non-album single
"—" denotes a single that did not chart or was not released.

=== Promotional singles ===
Title	Year	Album
"Fiesta"	2010	Pocoyó
"¡Bienvenidos Al Mundo De Pocoyó!"	2010	Pocoyó
"Nuestro Primer Día"	2012	Non-album single
"Soñar"	2015	Cinderella (Original Motion Picture Soundtrack) (Spanish edition) / Adrenalina
"Jaque al Rey" (with Belén Aguilera)	2019	Catarsis
"No Vives por Mí"	2019	Catarsis
"Despiértame Cuando Te Vayas"	2020	Catarsis
"Lo Que Perdí al Perderte"	2020	Catarsis
"No Te Lo Mereces"	2020	Catarsis
"Fugitiva"	2020	Catarsis
"Siempre Es Navidad Junto a Ti"	2020	Non-album single

== Tours ==
=== Solo tours ===
- 2006: Tour Edurne
- 2007: Tour Ilusión
- 2008: Mini Tour Première
- 2010: Tour Nueva Piel
- 2014: Painkiller Tour
- 2015–16: Adrenalina Tour

=== Joint tours ===
- 2005: Tour Operación Triunfo
- 2008: Grease, el musical de tu vida
- 2011: Tour PopStars
- 2011–13: Grease, el musical
- 2013: 40 Hot Mix Road Show

== Filmography ==
=== Film ===
Year	Title	Role	Notes
2008	Cruce	Laura	Shortfilm
2011	Muchas vidas: El viaje del vidrio	Edurne	Shortfilm
2012	Está en tu mano: Cruz Roja y Vichy	Edurne	Shortfilm
2025	McMansion	Herself	

=== Television ===
Year	Title	Role	Notes
2002	Hospital Central	Marga	1 episode
2003	Ana y los 7	Rebeca	4 episodes
2005	Operación Triunfo	as herself	Contestant
2006	Cambio de clase	as herself	1 episode
2006	Cruz y Raya/Juan y José show	as herself	Host; Sketch De vez en cuando la vida
2007	Edurne y sus bichos	as herself	Presenter; 2 seasons
2008	Es bello vivir: Especial Nochevieja	Nurse	Sketch
2009	Con el vértigo en los talones: Especial Nochevieja	Marta Sánchez	Sketch
2010	¡Más que baile!	as herself	Contestant/Runner-up
2010	Invasores	as herself	Invader; guest artist
2010	La hora de José Mota	Águila Rosa	Sketch, parody of Águila Roja
2011	Se lo que hicisteis...	as herself	Guest artist; She worked in a Lip Dub for episode 1,000
2013/2014	Tu cara me suena	as herself	1st season (guest) and 3rd season (contestant/winner)
2014	Todo va bien	as herself	Host, 110 episodes
2015	Eurovision Song Contest 2015	as herself	Spain's representative
2015	Gym Tony	Leyre	1 episode
2015	¡Un, Dos, Chef!	as herself	Guest, 1 episode
2016	Objetivo Eurovisión	as herself	Judge and guest performer
2016–2023	Got Talent España	as herself	Judge
2019	La que se avecina	Waitress	1 episode
2019	Servir y proteger	Sara Barrios	Regular role; 140 episodes
2020	Idol Kids	as herself	Judge
2020–present	Fam Jam ¡Baila en familia!	as herself	Host
2025–present	La Voz Kids	as herself	Coach

== Awards and nominations ==
Year	Category	Award	Result
2006	Premio Naranja de la Sierra a la música	Naranja-Limón Awards	Won
2006	Best New Artist	Principales Awards	Nominated
2006	"Tanga" Girl of the Year (Chica Tanga Girl)	Evax Awards	Won
2008	Nacionales de la Música	Garamond Awards	Won
2008	Best Female Pop Singer	Cosmopolitan Awards	Nominated
2010	Singer of the Year	Must! Awards	Nominated
2011	Best Video for "Oigo mi corazón"	Must! Awards	Won
2011	Best Artist	Must! Awards	Nominated
2014	Female Voice of the year	Propolis Awards	Won

Preceded by Ruth Lorenzo with "Dancing in the Rain"	Spain in the Eurovision Song Contest; 2015	Succeeded by Barei with "Say Yay!"
