= Perfect Bliss =

2001 single by Bellefire

Single by Bellefire

from the album After the Rain
- Released: 2 July 2001 (UK)
- Studio: Shane Songs (Stockholm, Sweden)
- Length: 3:38
- Label: Virgin
- Songwriters: Jörgen Elofsson; Phil Thornalley
- Producers: Jörgen Elofsson; Mathias Venge

Bellefire singles chronology
"Perfect Bliss" (2001)	"Buzzstyle (Find My Way)" (2002)

Alternative cover
- Japanese release cover artwork

"Perfect Bliss" is the debut single of Irish girl group Bellefire, released as the lead single from their first album, After the Rain (2001). Issued in 2001, the song peaked at number two on the Irish Singles Chart in June of the same year, ending the year as Ireland's 23rd-best-performing single. On 2 July 2001, "Perfect Bliss" was released in the United Kingdom, reaching number 18 on the UK Singles Chart.

== Music video ==
The music video for "Perfect Bliss" was directed by Greg Masuak with post-production from Chris Dean and Justin Mullender.

== Track listings ==
UK HDCD single

1. "Perfect Bliss" – 3:38
2. "Don't Let Me Down" – 4:25
3. "Dancing Inside" – 3:50
4. "Perfect Bliss" (video)

UK cassette single and Japanese CD single

1. "Perfect Bliss" – 3:38
2. "Don't Let Me Down" – 4:25
3. "Dancing Inside" – 3:50

European CD single

1. "Perfect Bliss" – 3:38
2. "Don't Let Me Down" – 4:25

== Credits and personnel ==
Credits are lifted from the UK CD single liner notes and the After the Rain album booklet.

Studios

- Recorded at Shane Songs Studios (Stockholm, Sweden)
- Strings recorded at Polar Studios (Stockholm, Sweden)
- Mixed in 2001 at Mono Music Studios (Stockholm, Sweden)

Personnel

- Jörgen Elofsson – writing, keyboards, programming, production, arrangement
- Phil Thornalley – writing
- Bellefire – vocals
- Jeanette Olsson – additional backing vocals
- Mathias Venge – guitars, programming, production, arrangement
- Stockholm Session Strings – strings
- Ulf Janssen – string arrangement
- Henrik Janssen – string arrangement
- Håkan Wollgård – recording (strings)
- Bernard Löhr – mixing

== Charts ==
=== Weekly charts ===
Weekly chart performance for "Perfect Bliss"
Chart (2001)	Peak position
Belgium (Ultratop 50 Flanders)	23
Europe (Eurochart Hot 100)	62
Ireland (IRMA)	2
Scottish Singles Sales (Official Charts)	9
Switzerland (Schweizer Hitparade)	34
UK Singles (Official Charts)	18

=== Year-end charts ===
Year-end chart performance for "Perfect Bliss"
Chart (2001)	Position
Ireland (IRMA)	23

== Release history ==
Release history and formats for "Perfect Bliss"
Region	Date	Format(s)	Label(s)	Ref.
Ireland	2001	CD; cassette	Virgin	
United Kingdom	2 July 2001	CD; cassette	Virgin	
Japan	8 August 2001	CD	Virgin	
