= Bounce (film) =

2000 film by Don Roos

- Theatrical release poster
- Directed by: Don Roos
- Written by: Don Roos
- Produced by: Michael Besman, Steve Golin
- Starring: Ben Affleck; Gwyneth Paltrow; Joe Morton; Natasha Henstridge; Tony Goldwyn; Johnny Galecki; David Paymer; Alex D. Linz; Jennifer Grey
- Cinematography: Robert Elswit
- Edited by: David Codron
- Music by: Mychael Danna
- Distributed by: Miramax Films
- Release date: November 17, 2000
- Running time: 106 minutes
- Country: United States
- Language: English
- Budget: $35 million
- Box office: $53.4 million

Bounce is a 2000 American romantic drama film directed by Don Roos, and starring Ben Affleck and Gwyneth Paltrow.

== Plot ==
In Chicago's O'Hare airport, advertising executive Buddy Amaral is delayed by a snow storm for a return flight to Los Angeles, on the same airline he has just signed as a big client. He meets writer Greg Janello, and when his flight resumes boarding, Buddy gives his ticket to Greg so he can get home to his wife and sons, eight-year-old Scott and four-year-old Joey.

Buddy convinces his friend and airline employee Janice Guerrero to allow Greg to take his place on the flight. While spending the night with fellow stranded passenger Mimi, he sees on television that the flight crashed. He has Janice check into the computer system to change his for Greg's name on the passenger manifest.

Greg's wife Abby is awakened by news of the crash, and for many hours is torn between hope and despair, clinging to the belief that Greg would still arrive on the later flight on which he was originally booked, until his death is confirmed.

Once back in Los Angeles, the airline dictates that Buddy run a series of innocuous ads to ameliorate the tragic consequences of the crash, which win a Clio Award. Plagued with guilt, Buddy makes a drunken scene at the awards show, and begins a stint in Alcoholics Anonymous. One of the steps in recovery is to make up for past misdeeds, so Buddy seeks out Abby, a budding realtor, giving her a tip on a commercial office building that Jim, Buddy's partner and boss, has put a bid on. In return, Abby treats Buddy to a night at Dodger Stadium. Their relationship blossoms, even as Buddy does not tell her about being indirectly responsible for Greg's death.

When the airline settles with Greg's estate, Abby next wants to put her boys on an aircraft to Palm Springs to get over their fear of flying. Buddy asks to go along with them, and soon develops a strong bond with the two boys. On the return trip, Buddy says he has a secret he will reveal the next day.

It all comes apart when Mimi shows up, with a video of Greg and Buddy having a drink in the airport bar. Abby is devastated by Buddy lying to her and demands that he leave her home and her life - though also demands that he say goodbye to the boys. Buddy comes back the next day and talks to Scott, who is afraid that his father died trying to get home for a Boy Scouts Christmas tree outing. Abby harbors the same guilt for pressuring Greg to come home on the fateful flight.

The victims' families sue the airline for damages, and Janice's role is revealed when Buddy is called to testify. As Abby watches on television, Buddy explains that he gave his ticket to Greg and did not take Greg's in exchange. In coercing Janice to change the roster, the airline's security procedures were compromised, which gets her fired. Buddy is excused by the judge, but still feels guilty.

Buddy resigns from his firm, having compromised his client, the airline. Abby comes by to tell him that his talk with Scott had helped them both. Buddy, sensing that Abby is about to leave, asks her to help him rent his beachfront home or put it up for sale. As Buddy starts to talk about his plans, Abby realizes she can forgive him.

== Cast ==
- Ben Affleck as Buddy Amaral
- Gwyneth Paltrow as Abby Janello
- Joe Morton as Jim Willer
- Natasha Henstridge as Mimi Prager
- Tony Goldwyn as Greg Janello
- Johnny Galecki as Seth
- Alex D. Linz as Scott Janello
- David Dorfman as Joey Janello
- Jennifer Grey as Janice Guerrero
- Caroline Aaron as Donna
- Edward Edwards as Ron Wachter
- Lisa Joyner as T.V. Announcer
- Juan Garcia as Kevin Walters
- David St. James as Judge
- David Paymer as Prosecuting Attorney Mandel (uncredited)

== Production ==
Bounce began development under Steve Golin at Propaganda Films (a PolyGram Filmed Entertainment subsidiary). Paltrow and Affleck had both previously starred in Shakespeare in Love and had dated on-and-off. Affleck thought he was too young for the part, but Paltrow convinced to take the role, encouraging him to take it as an opportunity to do something different from his earlier screen roles. Los Angeles Center Studios was used to shoot on location in downtown Los Angeles, standing in for wintertime Chicago and an airplane scene in studio. Principal photography began on August 30, 1999, with shooting completed on November 7, 1999.

Bounce became the first film to be delivered via satellite, with AMC Empire playing it exclusively in its digital format. It premiered at the Ziegfeld Theater in New York. The film was scheduled for release July 7, 2000 but after public complaints from Affleck the release date was delayed to November.

== Music ==
=== Soundtrack ===
Bounce: Music from and Inspired by the Miramax Motion Picture

Soundtrack album (Digital download)/Audio CD by Various
- Released: November 7, 2000
- Label: Arista

CD
No.	Title	Artist	Length
1.	"Need to Be Next to You"	Leigh Nash	4:07
2.	"Central Reservation" (The Then Again Version)	Beth Orton	3:59
3.	"Here with Me"	Dido	4:13
4.	"Divided"	Tara MacLean	3:23
5.	"Silence"	Delerium featuring Sarah McLachlan	6:35
6.	"I'm No Ordinary Girl"	Anika Paris	3:59
7.	"Lose Your Way"	Sophie B. Hawkins	4:03
8.	"My Baby and Me"	Nick Garrisi	2:37
9.	"Rome Wasn't Built in a Day"	Morcheeba	3:35
10.	"Hush"	Angie Aparo	4:28
11.	"Our Affair" (Remix)	Carly Simon	3:27
12.	"Love" (Remix)	Sixpence None the Richer	3:37
13.	"The Only Thing That's Real"	Sister 7	4:10
14.	"Never Gonna Come Back Down"	BT	5:45

=== Score ===
Bounce: Original Motion Picture Score

Film score (Digital download)/Audio CD by Mychael Danna
- Released: November 21, 2000
- Length: 30:23
- Label: Varèse Sarabande

1. Weather [3:27]
2. Bed Time [1:08]
3. Boarding Pass [2:33]
4. Moving Day [1:06]
5. Hangover [0:57]
6. Crash [1:37]
7. Nice To Meet You [1:35]
8. Now I Am [1:09]
9. So Brave [1:45]
10. Seven Steps [2:18]
11. Christmas Trees [1:47]
12. Award [1:21]
13. Kiss [1:40]
14. Deception [1:12]
15. Say Goodbye [1:21]
16. Testimony [1:36]
17. You're Excused [1:46]
18. Can We Try? [2:05]

== Reception ==
The film opened at #5 at the North American box office making $11.4 million its opening weekend. It went on to gross a worldwide total of $53.4 million.

On review aggregator Rotten Tomatoes, it has a 53% score, with an average rating of 5.5 out of 10, based on 108 reviews. The site's consensus states: "Critics say Bounce is more of a thud. Plot turns feel cliched and contrived, and the romance between Paltrow and Affleck fails to engage." On Metacritic, it has a score of 52% based on reviews from 31 critics, indicating "mixed or average" reviews. Audiences polled by CinemaScore gave the film an average grade of "B" on an A+ to F scale.

Roger Ebert gave it 3 out of 4 stars, and noted that the plot was a familiar one. "Lovers with untold secrets are a familiar movie situation ..." yet, he liked the film because the characters, from lead actors to secondary roles, were honest and endearing.

== Home media ==
Bounce was released on a two-disc DVD set on April 10, 2001 by Buena Vista Home Entertainment (under the Miramax Home Entertainment banner). The special features included a director's commentary, deleted scenes, a gag reel, and two behind-the-scenes documentaries. The film received a VHS release on September 11, 2001.

In December 2010, Miramax was sold by The Walt Disney Company, their owners since 1993. That month, the studio was taken over by private equity firm Filmyard Holdings. Filmyard licensed the home media rights for several Miramax titles to Lionsgate, and on April 10, 2012, Lionsgate Home Entertainment released Bounce on Blu-ray. In 2011, Filmyard Holdings licensed the Miramax library to streamer Netflix. This streaming deal included Bounce, and ran for five years, eventually ending on June 1, 2016.

Filmyard Holdings sold Miramax to Qatari company beIN Media Group during March 2016. In April 2020, ViacomCBS (now known as Paramount Skydance) acquired the rights to Miramax's library, after buying a 49% stake in the studio from beIN. Bounce was among the 700 titles Paramount acquired in the deal. They began reissuing many Miramax titles, and on September 22, 2020, Paramount Home Entertainment released a four film DVD set which included Bounce and three other Miramax-produced Gwyneth Paltrow films (Emma, Shakespeare in Love and View from the Top). Paramount Home Entertainment also reissued the individual film on Blu-ray on May 31, 2022. Paramount later made the film available on their subscription streaming service Paramount+, as well as on their free streaming service Pluto TV. In Australia, it was on the streaming service for the Paramount-owned broadcaster Network 10.
