= Ven Por Mí =

Single by Edurne

from the album Ilusión
- Released: 19 June 2007
- Recorded: 2007
- Genre: Pop, Dance
- Length: 3:56

Edurne singles chronology
"Te Falta Veneno" (2006)	"Ven Por Mí" (2007)	"Fue Para Los Dos" (2007)

"Ven Por Mí" (English: Come For Me) was the first official single from Edurne's Second studio album "Ilusión". It was a cover of the Sita song which was originally released in 2003 under the name "Come With Me".

== Track listing ==
1. "Ven Por Mí" (Electrico Club Mix) - 6:58
2. "Ven Por Mí" (Electrico Radio Mix) - 4:37
3. "Ven Por Mí" (Radio Edit) - 3:56

== Charts ==
Chart	Peak position
Spain Hot 100	22
Promusicae	6
