= Who Will Save Your Soul =

1996 single by Jewel

- US CD variant of standard artwork

Single by Jewel

from the album Pieces of You
- B-side: "Near You Always"
- Released: April 23, 1996
- Length: 4:00 (radio version)
- Label: Atlantic
- Songwriter: Jewel Kilcher
- Producer: Ben Keith

Jewel singles chronology
| "Who Will Save Your Soul" (1996) | "You Were Meant for Me" (1996) |

Music video
- "Who Will Save Your Soul" on YouTube

"Who Will Save Your Soul" is a song written and performed by American singer-songwriter Jewel. It is produced by Ben Keith and was the first song released from her first studio album, Pieces of You (1995), by Atlantic Records. The song became a hit in North America and Australasia, peaking at number seven in Canada, number 11 in the United States, number 14 in New Zealand, and number 27 in Australia. It was also moderately successful in the United Kingdom, reaching number 52 on the UK Singles Chart. The accompanying music video was directed by Geoff Moore and filmed in the women's restroom at Los Angeles City Hall.

== Background ==
Jewel has said that "Who Will Save Your Soul" was the first song that she ever wrote and has explained her creative process in interviews and on-stage as:

When I was about sixteen years old I took a train from Michigan to San Diego and then into Tijuana and hitchhiked around Mexico. It seemed like everybody else was looking for somebody to save them. I wrote it during that trip, but I had no idea it would ever be on a record.

The original version of "Who Will Save Your Soul" was never released on Pieces of You. During the process of picking songs, it was decided that it would be re-recorded for its radio release, which removes a verse. A commercial single of "Who Will Save Your Soul" was released in the United States in 1996. It became Jewel's first hit single, peaking at number 11 on the Billboard Hot 100.

== Critical reception ==
Larry Flick from Billboard magazine called the song a "charmer". He added, "Amid a spare setting of strumming guitars, twinkling piano lines, and playful percussion, she comes off a tad like Joan Osborne, but with less earthy grit and more girlish glee. If there is a hit for Jewel on this album, this is probably her best shot. The odds appear to be in her favor." Steve Baltin from Cash Box wrote that on songs like “Who Will Save Your Soul”, "Jewel shows a depth people three times her age will never approach."

== Music video ==
The music video for "Who Will Save Your Soul" was directed by American photographer and director Geoff Moore. The video features Jewel singing the song interspersed with the goings-on in a restroom. It is shown in both black-and-white and color and was filmed in the women's restroom at Los Angeles City Hall. It was nominated for MTV Video Music Awards in the Best Female Video and Best New Artist in a Video categories.

== Awards ==
| Year | Award-giving body | Award | Result |
|---|---|---|---|
| 1996 | MTV Video Music Awards | Best Female Video | Nominated |
| 1996 | MTV Video Music Awards | Best New Artist | Nominated |
| 1997 | Grammy Awards | Best Female Pop Vocal Performance | Nominated |

== Track listings ==
- US CD and cassette single
1. "Who Will Save Your Soul" – 4:00
2. "Near You Always" – 3:08
- UK, European, and Australian CD single
1. "Who Will Save Your Soul" – 4:00
2. "Pieces of You" – 4:15
3. "Emily" – 3:15
- UK cassette single
1. "Who Will Save Your Soul" – 4:00
2. "Emily" – 3:15

== Charts ==
=== Weekly charts ===
| Chart (1996) | Peak position |
|---|---|
| Australia (ARIA) | 27 |
| Canada Top Singles (RPM) | 7 |
| Canada Adult Contemporary (RPM) | 18 |
| Canada Rock/Alternative (RPM) | 14 |
| New Zealand (Recorded Music NZ) | 14 |
| Scottish Singles Sales (Official Charts) | 44 |
| UK Singles (Official Charts) | 52 |
| US Billboard Hot 100 | 11 |
| US Adult Alternative Airplay (Billboard) | 1 |
| US Adult Contemporary (Billboard) | 29 |
| US Adult Pop Airplay (Billboard) | 5 |
| US Alternative Airplay (Billboard) | 14 |
| US Pop Airplay (Billboard) | 3 |
| US Cash Box Top 100 | 7 |

=== Year-end charts ===
| Chart (1996) | Position |
|---|---|
| Canada Top Singles (RPM) | 84 |
| US Billboard Hot 100 | 25 |
| US Adult Top 40 (Billboard) | 18 |
| US Modern Rock Tracks (Billboard) | 37 |
| US Top 40/Mainstream (Billboard) | 12 |
| US Triple A (Billboard) | 13 |

== Release history ==
| Region | Date | Format(s) | Label(s) | Ref. |
|---|---|---|---|---|
| United States | April 23, 1996 | Contemporary hit radio | Atlantic | |
| United States | May 14, 1996 | Cassette | Atlantic | |
| United States | June 4, 1996 | CD | Atlantic | |
