= You Were Meant for Me (Jewel song) =

1996 single by Jewel

Single by Jewel

from the album Pieces of You
- B-side: "Foolish Games"; "Cold Song"; "Rocker Girl"
- Released: October 15, 1996
- Genre: Pop
- Length: 4:13 (album version); 3:45 (radio edit)
- Label: Atlantic
- Songwriters: Jewel Kilcher; Steve Poltz
- Producers: Ben Keith; Peter Collin

Jewel singles chronology
"Who Will Save Your Soul" (1996)	"You Were Meant for Me" (1996)	"Foolish Games" (1997)

Music video
- "You Were Meant for Me" on YouTube

"You Were Meant for Me" is a song by the American singer-songwriter Jewel, released on her first album, Pieces of You (1995). It was written by Jewel and Steve Poltz. It describes a failed relationship and the narrator's inadequate attempts at moving on with her life.

"You Were Meant for Me" was released by Atlantic Records as the second single from Pieces of You. It reached number two on the US Billboard Hot 100 for two weeks and number one on the Billboard Adult Contemporary chart for a single week. In 1997, a reissue of the single containing the unreleased "Foolish Games" allowed the song to rebound to number seven on the Hot 100, eventually totaling 65 weeks in the top 100, which at the time was a record. "You Were Meant for Me" reached number three in Australia, number two in Canada and number 32 in the United Kingdom. The accompanying music video was directed by Lawrence Carroll and won the award for Best Female Video at the 1997 MTV Video Music Awards.

"Foolish Games" / "You Were Meant for Me" ranked at number 15 on Billboard's "All Time Top 100" list in 2008. When the All Time chart was retabulated for the chart's 55th anniversary in 2013, it remained in the top 20 at number 17. The song was also re-recorded for Jewel's Greatest Hits album with backing vocals from the country trio Pistol Annies.

== Background ==
"You Were Meant for Me" was Jewel's second single to be taken from her debut album. Atlantic Records had Jewel re-record the song for a more radio-friendly version. Initially, the first version that was released was the "Juan Patino Radio Mix" (with a music video produced by Sean Penn). This version omits the first two lines of the chorus and the last four lines of the second verse, and did not gather much attention. It was later cancelled, with the video pulled from MTV and VH1. Jewel recorded the song for a third time, and the resulting version produced is known as the "radio version" and is featured on Greatest Hits.

The original radio version, "Juan Patino Radio Mix", only appeared on a promotional LP titled Phyllis Barnabee Finally Gets a Bra in 1996, and its only commercial release came on a Canadian various artists compilation entitled "Now! 2" that same year. The actual "radio version" was released on a commercial CD single and later on a re-release of Pieces of You.

== Composition ==
"You Were Meant for Me" is written in the key of E minor with a moderate, swinging tempo of 114 beats per minute. The song follows a chord progression of Cadd9–G/B–C–Em, and Jewel's vocals span from G_{3} to C_{5}.

== Release ==
"You Were Meant for Me" was serviced to US contemporary hit radio on October 15, 1996. Following its release as a commercial single later in the year, the song appeared on the Billboard Hot 100, climbing to a peak of number two in April 1997. As the single began descending the chart, radio stations began airing the B-side, "Foolish Games", and it soon garnered enough airplay to become the new A-side according to Billboard chart rules. Although the single was deleted from retail in July 1997, constant airplay kept "Foolish Games" / "You Were Meant for Me" within the upper reaches of the Hot 100. On October 7, 1997, the single was re-released to retail. With physical sales now combined with airplay points, the single re-entered the top 10, reaching number seven early the following month. In December, the single spent its 56th week on the Hot 100, surpassing Everything but the Girl's "Missing" as the longest-lasting single on the ranking at the time. In total, it spent 65 weeks on the Hot 100.

== Critical reception ==
Steve Baltin from Cash Box named "You Were Meant for Me" Pick of the Week in November 1995, writing that "this simple, charming pop ditty shows why Jewel's star is rising at a meteoric rate, with no sign of slowing down." He added, "A staple of VH1 and Triple A for the past couple of months, Jewel has just landed a role in the star-studded pop version of The Wizard of Oz. The ensuing publicity from that, coupled with the previous success of 'Who Will Save Your Soul', should break this song out in a big way. It couldn't happen to a more deserving artist or song." Another Cash Box editor, Daina Darzin complimented it as "a sweetly affecting, charming tune whose easy groove showcases her effortless, lovely voice." British magazine Music Week gave it a score of four out of five, describing it as "[an] acoustic cross-fertilisation of Tori Amos and Alanis Morissette." In 2026, Billboard ranked "You Were Meant for Me" number three in their list of "The Biggest No. 2 Hot 100 Hits of All Time", noting that the song had peaked at number two, just behind Puff Daddy featuring Mase's "Can't Nobody Hold Me Down" and The Notorious B.I.G.'s "Hypnotize".

== Music video ==
The music video for "You Were Meant for Me" was directed by Lawrence Carroll for the Radio Edit. Steve Poltz appeared in the video. In the video Jewel and Poltz appeared together in numerous scenes, most of them depicting how both of them want to be together but always separated. In one scene, Poltz tries to reach for Jewel's hand, but a curtain appears between them separating their hands. In another scene, Jewel lies in front of Poltz and starts to undress and reveals her underwear, but instead of reaching for him, she moves away from him, leaving Poltz with his arms raised towards her. Other scenes include Jewel lying beside a little pond with some little ships (which is also the single's cover), sitting inside a boat in the middle of a room alone, and lastly sitting on the side of a bedroom while Poltz, shirtless, is on the other side and tries to reach for her. The video won the award for Best Female Video at the 1997 MTV Video Music Awards.

== Awards ==
Year	Nominee / work	Award	Result
1997	"You Were Meant for Me"	MTV Video Music Award for Best Female Video	Won
1997	"You Were Meant for Me"	MTV Video Music Award – Viewer's Choice	Nominated
1997	"You Were Meant for Me"	MTV Video Music Award for Video of the Year	Nominated

== Track listings ==
- US CD single and cassette single
1. "You Were Meant for Me" (album edit) – 3:48
2. "Foolish Games" (album version) – 5:38
- US CD single re-release
1. "You Were Meant for Me" (album edit) – 3:48
2. "Foolish Games" (album version) – 5:38
3. "Foolish Games" (radio edit) – 4:01

* The "Foolish Games" radio edit is not listed on the inlay of the single

- UK and Australian CD single, UK cassette single
1. "You Were Meant for Me" (album edit) – 3:39
2. "Cold Song" – 1:03
3. "Rocker Girl" – 1:44

== Charts ==
=== Weekly charts ===
Chart (1997–1998)	Peak position
Australia (ARIA)	3
Canada Top Singles (RPM)	2
Canada Adult Contemporary (RPM)	2
Iceland (Íslenski Listinn Topp 40)	37
Netherlands (Dutch Top 40 Tipparade)	8
Netherlands (Single Top 100)	69
New Zealand (Recorded Music NZ)	22
Scottish Singles Sales (Official Charts)	30
UK Singles (Official Charts)	32
US Billboard Hot 100	2
US Adult Alternative Airplay (Billboard)	6
US Adult Contemporary (Billboard)	1
US Adult Pop Airplay (Billboard)	1
US Alternative Airplay (Billboard)	26
US Pop Airplay (Billboard)	1

=== Year-end charts ===
Chart (1997)	Position
Australia (ARIA)	25
Canada Top Singles (RPM)	2
Canada Adult Contemporary (RPM)	4
US Billboard Hot 100	2
US Adult Contemporary (Billboard)	3
US Adult Top 40 (Billboard)	4
US Top 40/Mainstream (Billboard)	2
US Triple-A (Billboard)	22

Chart (1998)	Position
US Billboard Hot 100	87

=== Decade-end charts ===
Chart (1990–1999)	Position
US Billboard Hot 100	5

=== All-time charts ===
Chart	Position
US Billboard Hot 100	22

== Certifications ==
Region	Certification	Certified units/sales
Australia (ARIA)	Platinum	70,000^{^}
New Zealand (RMNZ)	Gold	15,000^{‡}
United States (RIAA)	Platinum	1,300,000
^{^} Shipments figures based on certification alone.^{‡} Sales+streaming figures based on certification alone.

== Release history ==
Region	Date	Format(s)	Label(s)	Ref.
United States	October 15, 1996	Contemporary hit radio	Atlantic	
United States	November 12, 1996	CD; cassette	Atlantic	
United States	October 7, 1997 (re-release)	CD; cassette	Atlantic	
United Kingdom	November 10, 1997	CD; cassette	Atlantic	
