= Kilcher =

Kilcher is a surname. Notable people with the surname include:

- Andreas Kilcher (born 1963), Swiss academic
- Atz Kilcher (born 1947), American reality TV personality
- Jewel Kilcher (born 1974), American singer-songwriter, actress, and poet
- Mossy Kilcher, American singer-songwriter from Alaska
- Q'orianka Kilcher (born 1990), American actress and singer
- Stefanie Martin-Kilcher (born 1945), Swiss archaeologist
- Werner Kilcher (1927–1995), Swiss equestrian rider
- Yule F. Kilcher (1913–1998), Swiss-born Alaska state senator and reality TV personality
