= Firelight (2012 film) =

- Written by: Ligiah Villalobos
- Directed by: Darnell Martin
- Starring: Cuba Gooding Jr. Q'orianka Kilcher; DeWanda Wise
- Country of origin: United States
- Original language: English

Production
- Executive producer: Alicia Keys

Original release
- Network: ABC
- Release: April 22, 2012

Firelight is a 2012 made-for-television drama film that first aired on ABC. The film was directed by Darnell Martin and starred Cuba Gooding Jr. and Q'orianka Kilcher. It told the story of a group of inmates at a facility for female juvenile delinquents who find a new lease on life by becoming volunteer firefighters. Several critics responded to the film favorably and Gooding won the NAACP Image Award for Outstanding Actor in a Television Movie, Mini-Series or Dramatic Special for his performance.

== Cast ==
- Cuba Gooding Jr. as DJ
- Q'orianka Kilcher as Caroline Magabo
- DeWanda Wise as Terry Easle
- Rivka Rivera as Pedra
- Emily Tremaine as Amy Scott
- Sianoa Smit-McPhee as Tammy
