= Hohe Möhr =

Mountain in Baden-Württemberg, Germany

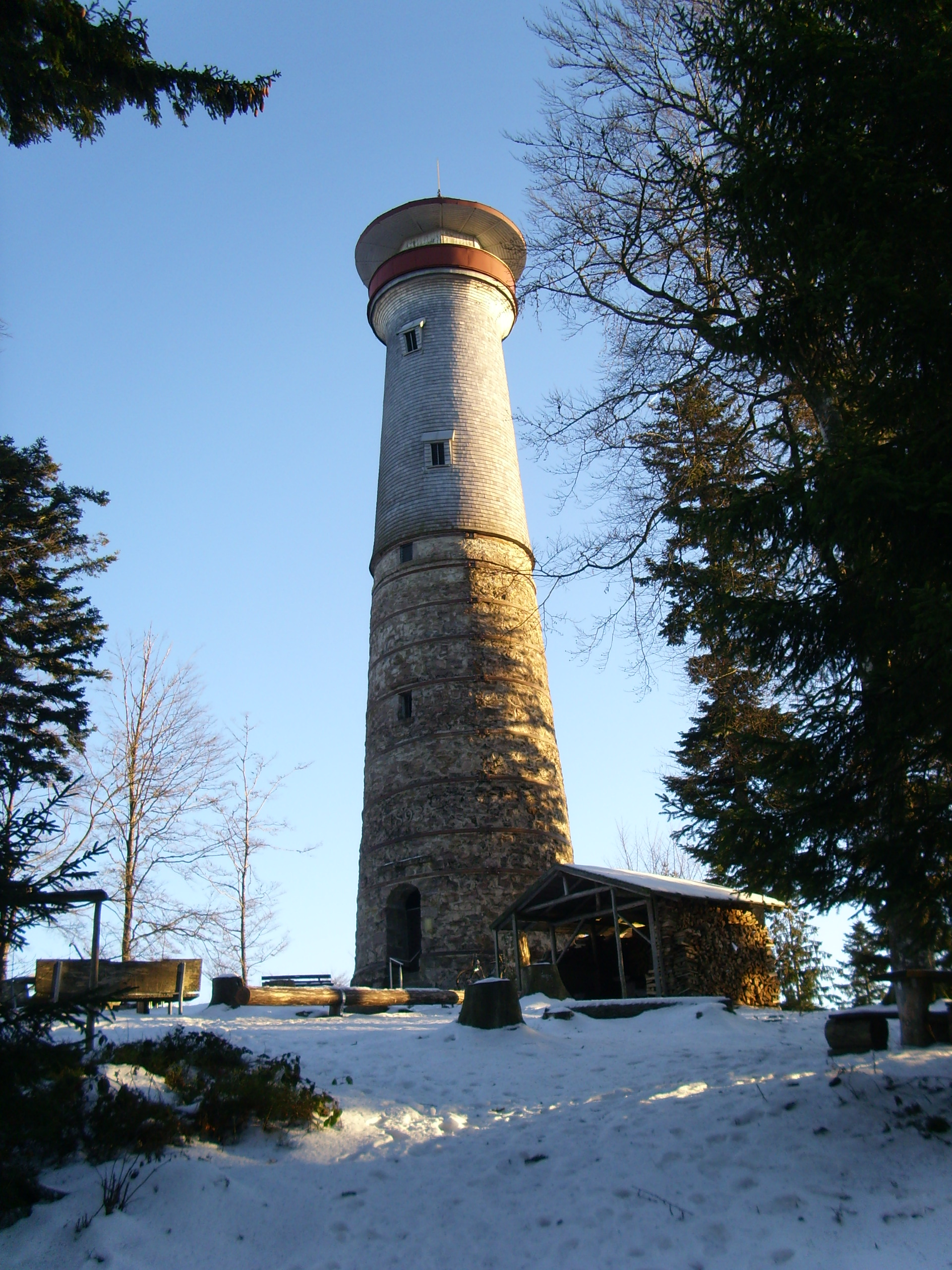
- Hohe Möhr observation tower

Highest point
- Elevation: 984 m above sea level (NHN) (3,228 ft)
- Coordinates: 47.6936°N 7.875°E

Geography
- Location within Baden-Württemberg
- Location: Baden-Württemberg, Germany
- Parent range: Black Forest

The Hohe Möhr is a mountain, 983.6 m above sea level (NHN), in the Black Forest near Schopfheim in the German state of Baden-Württemberg.

== Tower ==
On the Hohe Möhr is the roughly 30-metre-high Hohe Möhr Tower, an observation tower built by the Black Forest Club in 1924. In addition, the broadcaster, SWR, operates a VHF transmitter at 47°41′35″N 7°52′26″E, which uses a 77-metre-high, free-standing steel lattice tower.

The observation platform is about 25 metres above the ground, at a height of about 1,000 m above sea level, and, in clear weather, the Swiss Alps, the Jura and the Vosges can be seen. Additionally, the Wiese, Rhine and Wehra valleys, the Hotzenwald and the mountains of the Black Forest can also be seen.

== Access ==
The best route is from the Schweigmatt over the southern mountainside of the Hohe Möhr. There is a car park at the Schweigmatt swimming pool. From there it is ca. 2.5 km and 240 metres of climb to the tower along the road to the Hohe Möhr. Also suitable for prams or mountain bikes. There are also narrower footpaths from the Schweigmatt. Another route begins at Raitbach, from the Festival Hall car park on the Scheuermatt (end of Raitbach village). From there it is about 5 km and 420 metres of climbing. Both car parks have a ramblers' information board that displays various paths and linking walks. Those travelling by train can alight at Hausen-Raitbach station and get to the mountain via Raitbach or the Raitbacher Höhe and Hebelhöhe. The shortest route is about 7.5 km and climbs through ca. 580 metres. A board on the footpath to Raitbach gives information on these routes.

== Gallery ==
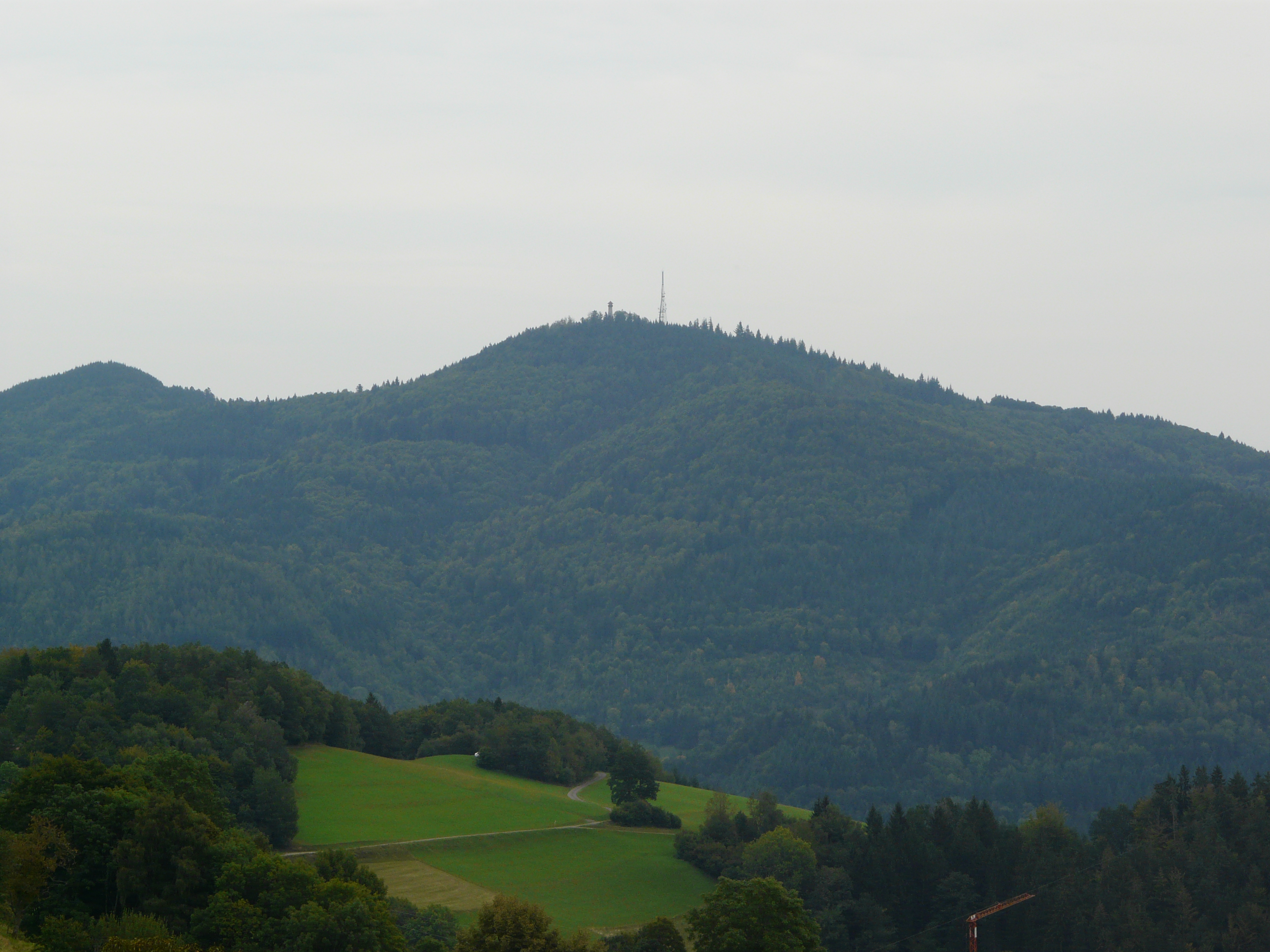
The Hohe Möhr seen from the Zeller Blauen. The transmitter may be seen to the right of the summit and the observation tower to the left

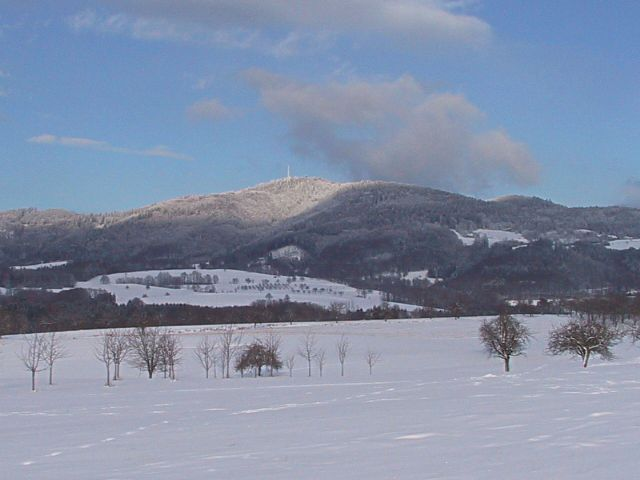
The mountain in winter seen from the southwest

== Literature ==
Ernst Müller, Albert Rieger: Die Geschichte des Hohe-Möhr-Turms, In: 100 Jahre Turm auf der Hohen Möhr, Festschrift des Schwarzwaldvereins Schopfheim, 1993, pp. 11–22
