= Schweigmatt =

Hamlet in Schopfheim, Lörrach, Germany

Coordinates: 47°41′N 7°53′E

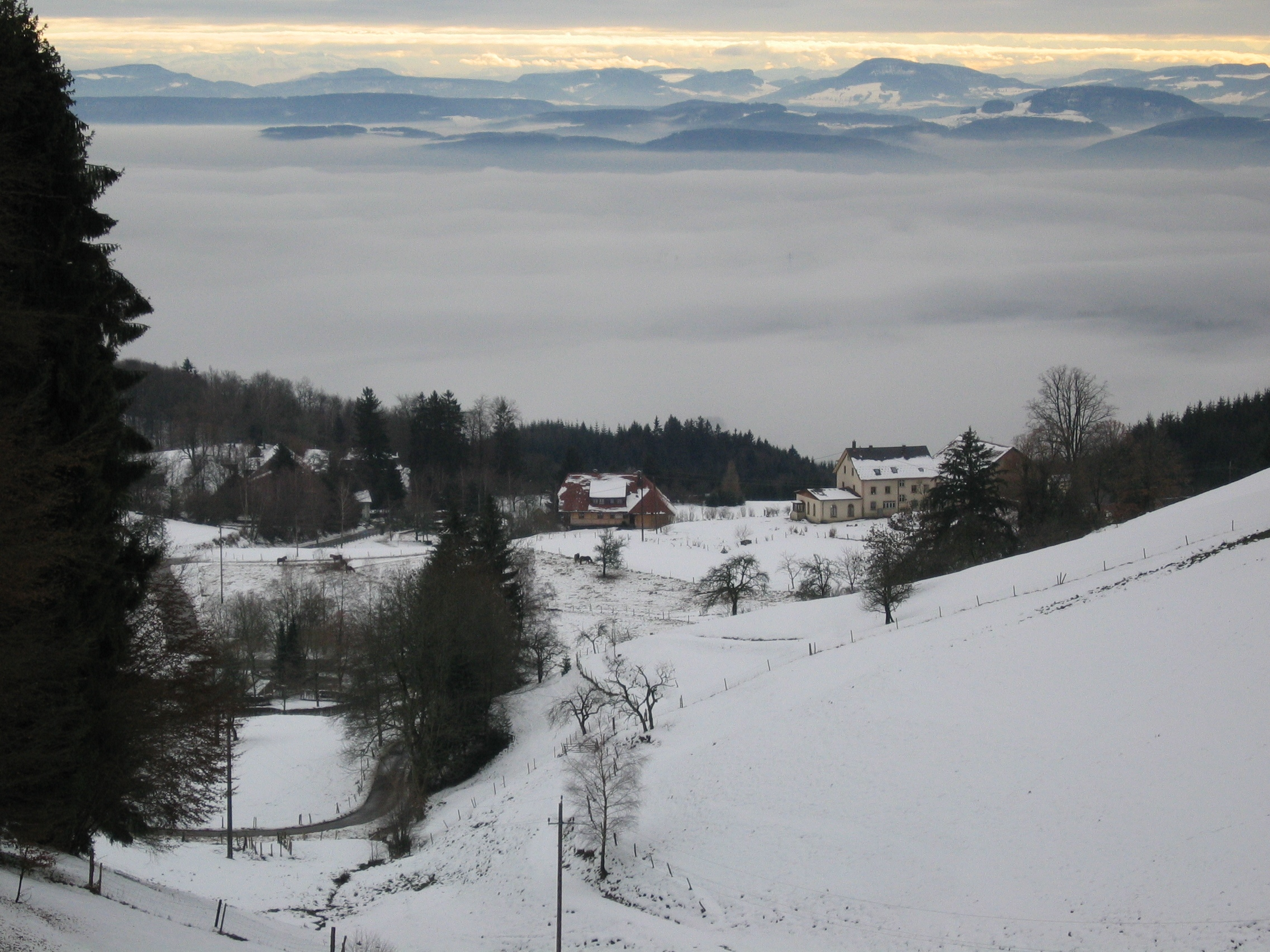

Schweigmatt is a hamlet located in the southern Black Forest of Germany at an altitude of 780 metres. It belongs to the village of Raitbach and is part of the municipality of Schopfheim in the district of Lörrach. Schweigmatt lies beneath the 985 m peak of the Hohe Möhr, from which it is possible to see as far as the Swiss Alps and Jura Mountains across the Rhine River.

This hamlet was first mentioned in documents in 1113, but gained international recognition only recently as the birthplace of actress Q'orianka Kilcher.
