= Yule F. Kilcher =

American politician (1913–1998)

Yule Kilcher

Member of the Alaska Senate from the H district
- In office January 28, 1963 – January 23, 1967
- Preceded by: Irwin Metcalf
- Succeeded by: W. I. "Bob" Palmer (redistricting)

Personal details
- Born: Julius Jacob Kilcher; March 9, 1913 Laufen, Switzerland
- Died: December 8, 1998 (aged 85) Homer, Alaska, U.S.
- Resting place: Kilcher Family Homestead
- Party: Democratic
- Spouse: Ruth Weber (divorced)
- Children: 8, including Mossy and Atz
- Relatives: Jewel (granddaughter); Q'orianka Kilcher (great-granddaughter)
- Education: University of Berne; University of Berlin
- Occupation: Homesteader, politician

Yule Forenorth Kilcher (born Julius Jacob Kilcher; March 9, 1913 – December 8, 1998) was a Swiss-born American homesteader who was a member of the Alaska state senate from 1963 to 1966.

He moved from Switzerland to Alaska in 1936 where he then lived permanently, after returning to Switzerland for a short time in 1939, outside of Homer, Alaska.

== Life ==
Yule Kilcher was born Julius Jacob Kilcher (the first name is sometimes given as Jules) on March 9, 1913, in Laufen, Switzerland, which was then in the canton of Bern (now in the canton of Basel-Landschaft), to Edwin Kilcher and Lina Kilcher (née Alter). His place of origin was Nunningen in the canton of Solothurn. He grew up with four siblings in Zuchwil near the canton's capital, Solothurn. After the matura at Kantonsschule Solothurn, he studied comparative philology and archeology in Berlin, Bern, Grenoble, and Aix-en-Provence. In an autobiography he sent in 1963 to the newspaper Solothurner Zeitung, Kilcher wrote that he then worked as a journalist in North Africa, Poland, the United States, and in Scandinavia, where he also worked as a logger. In Sweden and in the Carpathian Mountains, he learned to build log houses. In 1936, Kilcher went for the first time to Alaska, intending to "found an idealistic community" there. In Alaska, he changed his name to Yule Forenorth Kilcher. He received 160 acres of land to homestead. This land was in the Kachemak Bay area, outside of Homer, Alaska.

In 1939, Kilcher went back to Switzerland for a short time, intending to persuade likeminded people to emigrate to Alaska. From 1940, he lived permanently in Alaska. In 1941, he married Ruth Helen Weber, originally from Pratteln, who was an American citizen. They had eight children who were all raised on the family homestead: Mairiis "Mossy", Wurtilla Dora "Wurzy", (Linda) Fay, Attila Kuno "Atz", Sunrise Diana Irene, (Edwin) Otto, Stellavera Septima and Catkin Melody. Kilcher sought a self-sufficient, natural lifestyle. The family lived without electricity and running water.

Yule Kilcher produced two documentaries, filmed on 16 mm film, The Last Frontier and A Pioneer Family in Alaska. These were the first documentaries depicting homesteading life. He showcased his documentaries around Europe in the years 1947/48 and from 1956 to 1958.

In 1955, Yule Kilcher was elected to the Constitutional convention which drew the Constitution of Alaska, as a representative of the Kenai Peninsula. He advocated for changing the spelling of the administrative division borough to boro, arguing that the u-g-h spelling "has a nostalgic reference looking back towards New York and further beyond the ocean towards England". The amendment failed on a voice vote. From there, he went on to hold the State Senate seat for the Democratic Party from 1963 until 1966. Kilcher considered himself part of the "radical" wing of his party and a "man of the people". In the Senate, he advocated for nature conservation. In 1968, he took part in the expedition that made the first crossing of the Harding Icefield from Homer to Seward. Exit Glacier received its name from that expedition leaving the icefield over the glacier.

Ruth and the children helped operate the homestead while Yule travelled to Juneau to attend the state legislature. Yule and Ruth Kilcher divorced in 1969. Ruth then moved to Tennessee, working as a journalist, writer and translator. In 1971, she married Charles Rodney "Rod" Mariott in New Mexico.

Yule Kilcher died in Homer on December 8, 1998. The governor of Alaska, at the time Tony Knowles, ordered state flags flown at half staff at the day of the funeral.

== Homesteading ==
In 1862, the United States of America passed the Homestead Law. If someone met certain requirements, they could obtain federally owned land as long as they proved they lived on the land and maintained it. As of 1986, homesteading is no longer possible in Alaska.

The Kilcher homestead grew from 160 acres to 600 acres of land. As time wore on, Yule saw how other homesteads around Kachemak Bay were slowly being divided up between family members and becoming smaller versions of the previous homestead. He did not want the hard work of his family's homestead to disappear. He created a conservation easement, set up in the 1990's, starting the Kilcher Family Trust. Through the trust, the 600 acres of the Kilcher homestead remains intact for future generations to grow on and improve.

== Family ==
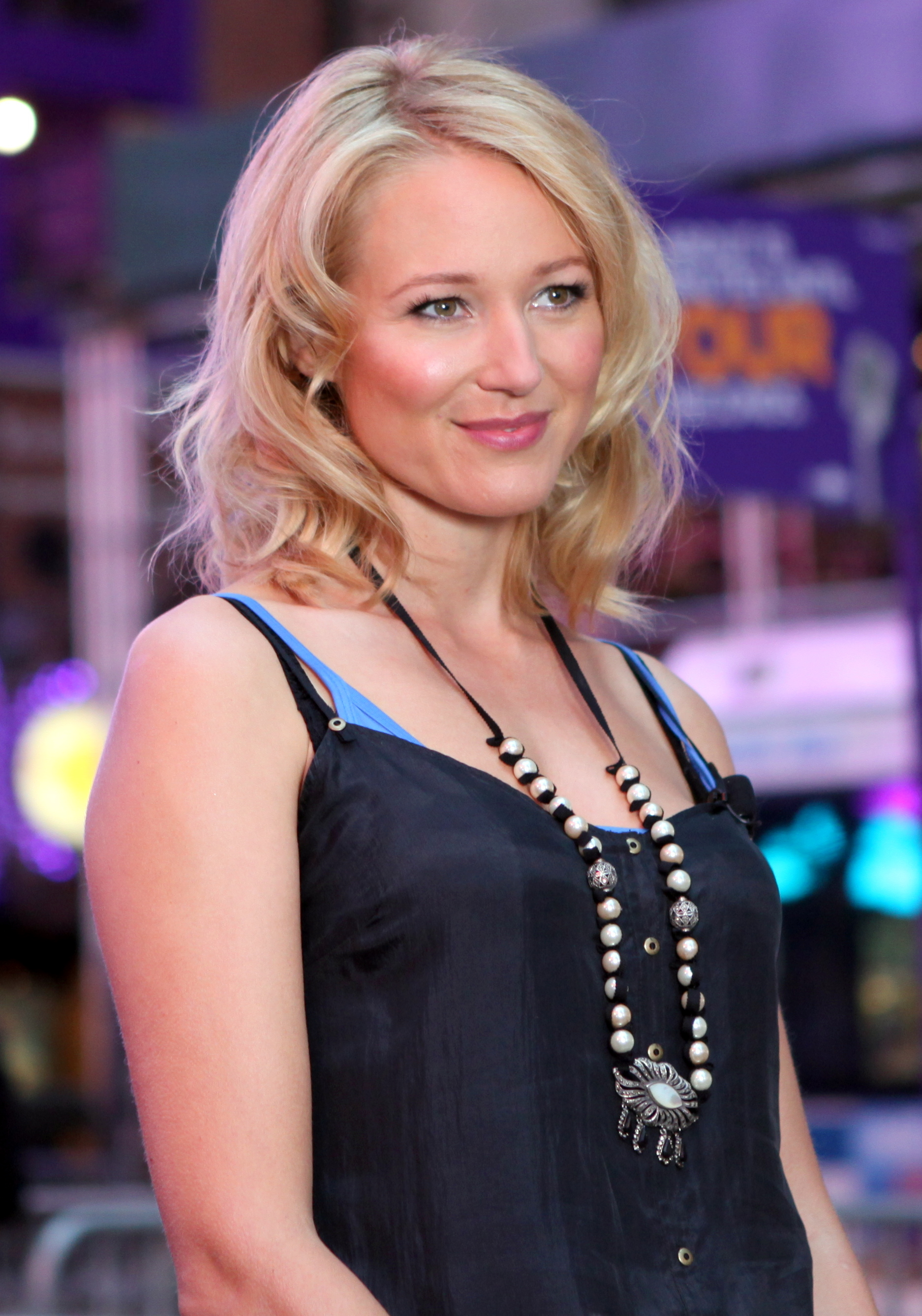
Yule Kilcher's granddaughter, the singer Jewel

American singer Jewel Kilcher (born in 1974), known by her first name Jewel, is a daughter of Yule Kilcher's son Atz, who himself is a singer-songwriter, known for his yodeling. In her autobiographical book Chasing Down the Dawn, Jewel describes her grandfather Yule as a brilliant scholar who spoke eight languages, outdoorsman and politician. According to Jewel, despite his charisma, charm and intelligence, "he could be a mean-spirited, hard man, especially to those closest to him". Near the end of his life, Yule regretted this behavior and was able to make amends with Atz Kilcher. American actress Q'orianka Kilcher (born in 1990) is a great-granddaughter of Yule Kilcher. Yule's youngest daughter, Catkin Kilcher Burton, served for 31 years in the United States Marine Corps and was awarded the Legion of Merit. At the end of her military career, she had the rank of colonel. As of 2012, she worked for the Republican Party.

The unconventional lifestyle of the Kilcher family often found media attention. In 1984, the Swiss documentary film Die schwierige Schule des einfachen Lebens ("The hard school of the simple life") by Alfi Sinniger portrayed Yule Kilcher and his family. Discovery Channel's reality TV series Alaska: The Last Frontier also portrays the life of the Kilchers in Alaska and was in its 10th season in 2021. In 2012, Swiss Radio and Television (SRF) broadcast the documentary film Rousseaus Kinder – Ein Reality-Check in Alaskas Wildnis ("Rousseau's children – a reality check in Alaska's wilderness") in its series DOK, making a comparison of Jean-Jacques Rousseau's philosophy to the lifestyle of the Kilcher family. A review in the newspaper Tages-Anzeiger criticised it for leaving that promised connection unclear.
