= Northwind Calling =

Mossy Kilcher album

Studio album by Mossy Kilcher
- Released: 1977; reissued 2020
- Genre: folk
- Length: 62:44
- Label: Tompkins Square Records (reissue)

Northwind Calling is a folk album by Alaskan singer-songwriter Mossy Kilcher. Initially released as a private press album in 1977, the album was not a commercial success but gained a cult following. It gained renewed attention when it was reissued in 2020 by Tompkins Square Records.

== Track listing ==
All music is composed by Mossy Kilcher

Side one
No.	Title	Length
1.	"So Long!!"	3:41
2.	"Fox Sparrow"	2:18
3.	"Sea Man"	2:45
4.	"Day Dream Land"	2:31
5.	"Northwind Calling"	3:36

Side two
No.	Title	Length
1.	"Coyote's Cry"	2:29
2.	"Going to Blow"	3:50
3.	"What Is That Light"	3:37
4.	"Eagle, Goodbye!"	2:10
5.	"Little Brown Violins"	3:14

Side three
No.	Title	Length
1.	"Cloudy Day"	3:59
2.	"It's Harder to Be Left Behind"	2:45
3.	"Alone Too Long"	3:12
4.	"Where Does This River Flow"	3:46
5.	"Flag of Green Lands Flying"	3:12

Side four
No.	Title	Length
1.	"Rainfall"	2:12
2.	"Mother's Song"	3:06
3.	"Changes, Changes"	2:41
4.	"Birds of Passage"	3:36
5.	"Come Back, Come Back"	4:04
