= Atz Kilcher =

American singer-songwriter

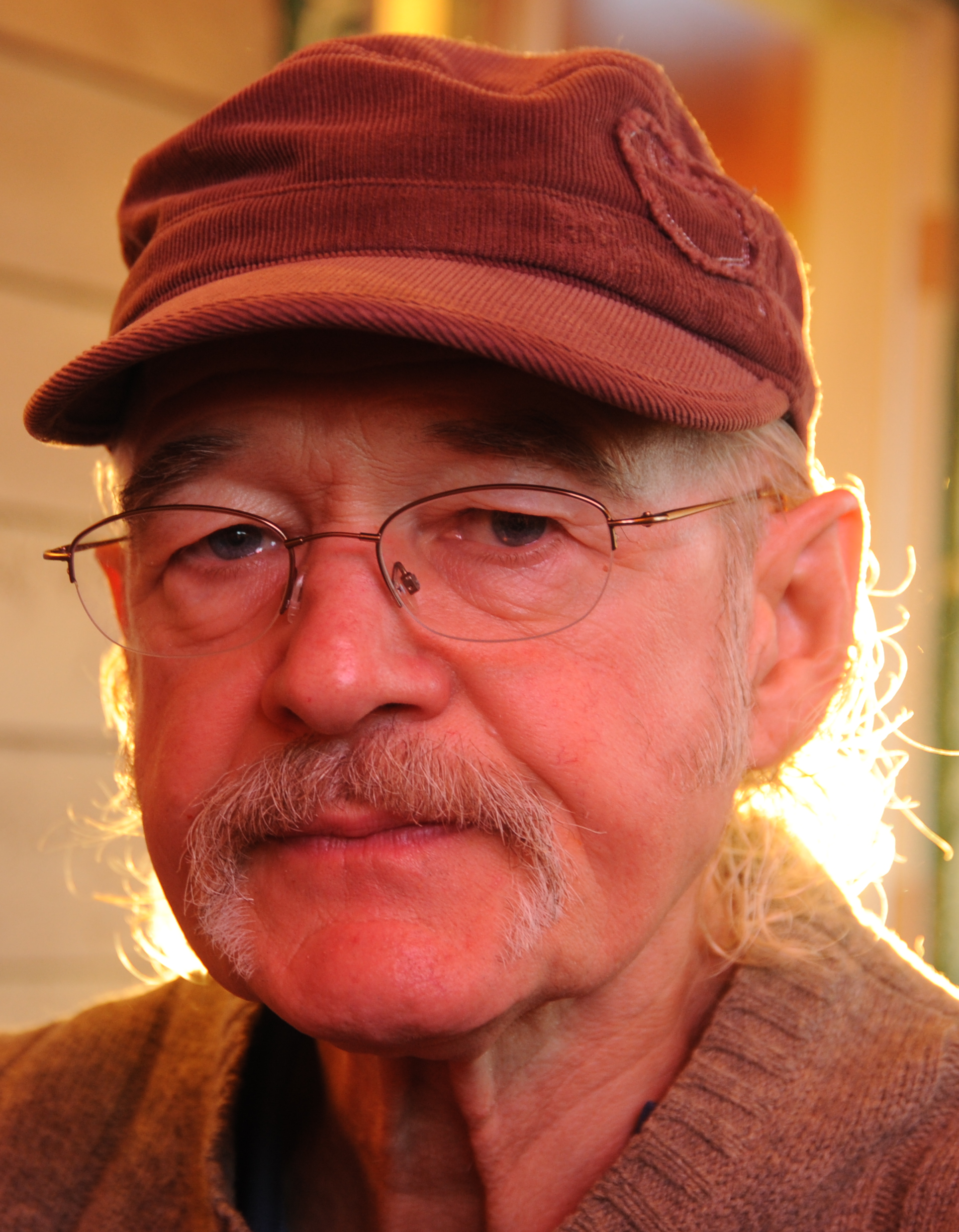
Atz Kilcher photographed in Homer in January 2014

Attila Kuno "Atz" Kilcher (born September 2, 1947) is an American singer-songwriter and the oldest son of Yule F. Kilcher and Ruth Weber. He is one of the stars on the Discovery show Alaska: The Last Frontier, which focuses on the Kilcher homestead established 80 years ago outside of Homer, Alaska on Kachemak Bay.

== Early life ==
Atz Kilcher was born to Yule Kilcher, who had moved to Alaska from Switzerland, and his wife Ruth (née Weber). His father was a scholar who spoke twelve languages and helped write Alaska's state charter as a member of the State Senate. His mother been an aspiring opera singer and became one of the first female journalists in Alaska, writing a column about homesteading for an Anchorage daily. He is the fourth of eight siblings and oldest son. His siblings include his brother, Otto, who co-stars on the Discovery Channel TV show, and six sisters: Wurtilla Hepp, Fay Graham, Catkin Kilcher Burton, Stellavera Kilcher, Mossy Kilcher and Sunrise Sjoeberg.

Because the local elementary school was beyond walking distance for the children, the Kilcher siblings were homeschooled by Ruth until they reached their teens. In high school, Atz was an athlete, competing in skiing, basketball, wrestling, and cross country. Having been raised Mormon, Kilcher later attended Brigham Young University.

Kilcher was drafted in 1967 for the Vietnam War, where he spent just under two years in the Army. He returned home and married Lenedra Carroll, and the couple had three children. His oldest, Shane, works on the homestead along with his youngest son, Atz Lee. His daughter, Jewel, is a Grammy-nominated folk singer.

Kilcher published his story-filled memoir in 2018, titled Son of a Midnight Land: A Memoir in Stories. He documents his life growing up on his family's homestead, his role in the Vietnam War, and his life as a social worker. He also describes the hardships he faced with the ever present angry moods of his father. The memoirist reflects on what he learned from working with his father and how that shaped him into who he is today.

== Kilcher Homestead ==
The Kilcher Homestead was established when his father Yule Kilcher moved to Alaska in 1940 and was given 160 acres of federal land to homestead. His mother Ruth and the children helped work the homestead while Yule traveled for months at a time to Juneau as a state Senator. Over time, the homestead grew to over 600 acres of land.

In the 1990s, Yule established the Kilcher Family Trust, which would prevent the homestead from being divided between his children, and would ensure that it remained intact for future generations of Kilchers to work the land he so loved. The homestead is owned by all 8 Kilcher siblings.

The family offers tours of the homestead, where an original cabin has been turned into a museum. There, old tools are displayed which were used for farming. As one of the siblings gives a tour, they offer first hand stories of growing up on their homestead.

== Singing and songwriting career ==
Kilcher is a known celebrity in the state of Alaska. He writes and sings his own songs about his life experiences. He is also known for his yodeling. He and his daughter, Jewel Kilcher, in her early life, travelled the state of Alaska performing his songs and yodeling together.

== Alaska: The Last Frontier ==
Discovery Channel started producing the TV Series Alaska: The Last Frontier. The show has had 11 seasons as of 2022 and features Atz, his brother Otto, and other family members from the Kilcher clan.
