= Q'orianka Kilcher =

German-Peruvian actress (born 1990)

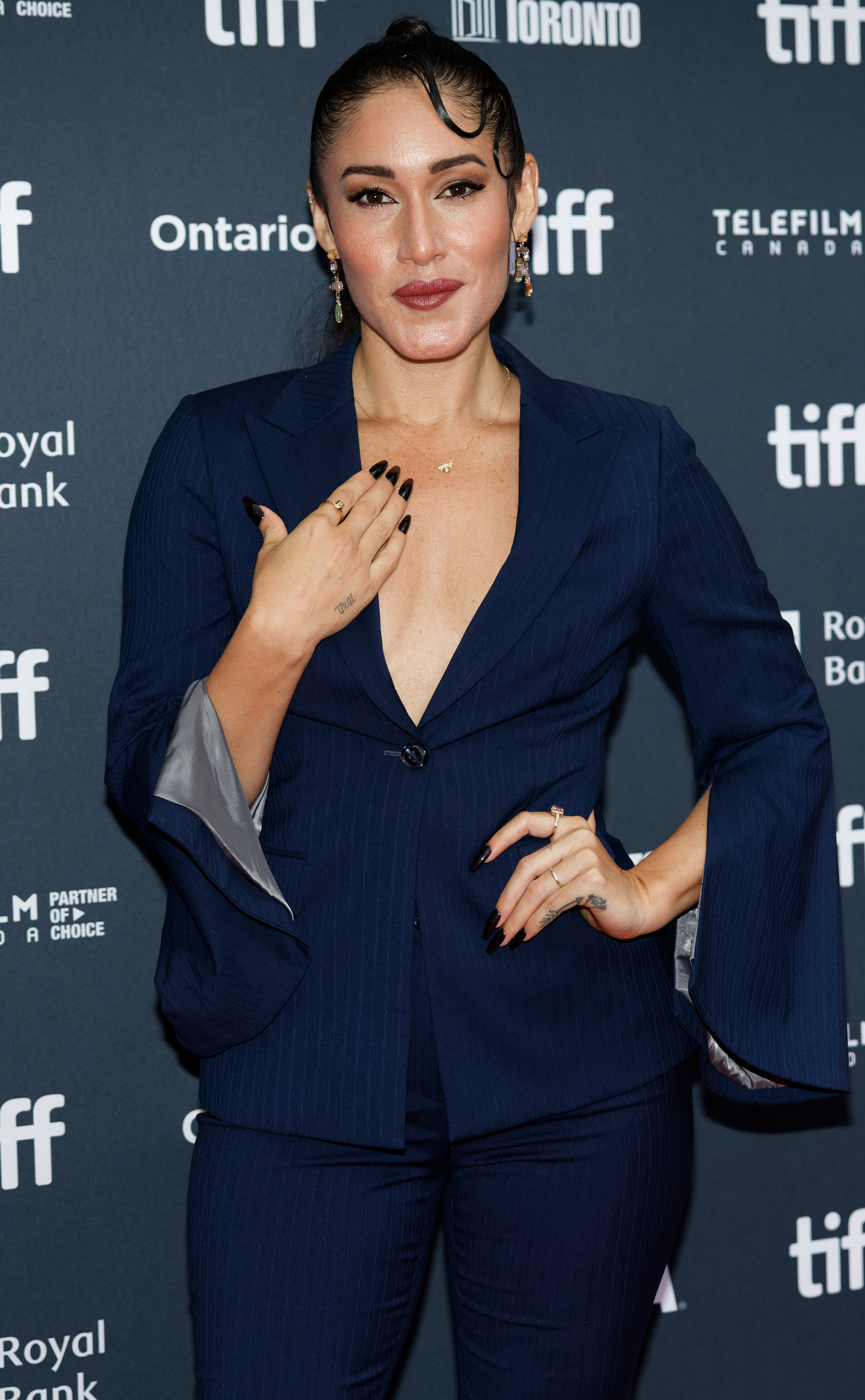
- Kilcher in 2024
- Born: Q'orianka Waira Qoiana Kilcher; February 11, 1990 (age 36); Schweigmatt, West Germany
- Occupation: Actress
- Years active: 2000–present
- Relatives: Jewel (first cousin once removed); Yule F. Kilcher (great-grandfather); Ray Genet (grandfather)

Q'orianka Waira Qoiana Kilcher (/ˌkɒriˈæŋkə ˈkɪltʃər/; born February 11, 1990) is an American actress. Her best known film roles are Pocahontas in Terrence Malick's 2005 film The New World, and Kaʻiulani in Princess Kaiulani (2009). In 2020, she starred in a recurring role on the Paramount Network show Yellowstone.

== Early life ==
Kilcher was born in Schweigmatt, Baden-Württemberg, West Germany. Her name Q'orianka means "Golden Eagle" in Quechua. Her father is of Quechua–Huachipaeri background from Peru, while her mother, Saskia Kilcher, is an American human rights activist of Swiss origin. When Kilcher was two, she and her mother moved to Kapaʻa, Hawaii.

== Career ==
At the age of ten, Kilcher was cast as a Little Choir Member in Ron Howard's How the Grinch Stole Christmas. She was 12 when she received a full scholarship to the Musician's Institute in Hollywood, where she studied vocal performance, music theory and songwriting.

She also studied martial arts and stunts: she is an accomplished black belt in Wushu kung fu and a stunt performer and has trained at the National Wushu Training Center and Impact Stunts.

At age 15, Kilcher portrayed Pocahontas in the Academy Award-nominated motion picture The New World (2005), directed by Terrence Malick. Her performance was critically acclaimed and won her the National Board of Review's best breakthrough performance of 2006, the 2006 Alma Award for best Latin American actress in a feature film, and numerous other award nominations. The film was released in December 2005. The film was a critical success, receiving several positive reviews and award nominations, but it was shown in only 811 theatres worldwide. It yielded a relatively low box office gross.

In the summer of 2006, Kilcher began filming the independent film The Power of Few, which she produced through her own production company, Entertainment On-Q. She played the title role in the 2009 feature film Princess Kaiulani. The film, about the overthrow of the Hawaiian monarchy, was released in May 2010 to negative reviews. But Kilcher received positive feedback for her role, with Roger Ebert writing that "she evokes great depth and sympathy in her role and seems to have created Kaiulani from the inside out."

In 2009, Kilcher performed in The People Speak, a documentary feature film that uses dramatic and musical performances of the letters, diaries, and speeches of common people in the U.S., based on historian Howard Zinn's A People's History of the United States.

A year later, she played Pinti in the family drama Shouting Secrets. The film won Best Film at the 36th American Indian Film Festival in San Francisco, and Kilcher was nominated for Best Supporting Actress. She also portrayed Kerrianne Larkin, daughter of Chibs Telford and Fiona Larkin, in the television series Sons of Anarchy.

In 2011, Kilcher played Tiger Lily in Neverland, a version of the Peter Pan story that aired on the Syfy Channel.

In 2012, Kilcher starred in Firelight alongside Cuba Gooding Jr. and played the role of Caroline Magabo, a young Latina inmate who finds a new lease on life by becoming a volunteer firefighter along with other female juvenile delinquents. In 2013, she portrayed Rayen in Running Deer, an award-winning short film produced and directed by Brent Ryan Green through Toy Gun Films.

Kilcher starred as the Chickasaw Nation representative and actress Te Ata in the 2017 film Te Ata.

In 2018, Kilcher appeared in TNT's The Alienist as Mary Palmer. Kilcher appeared in the 2019 adventure film Dora and the Lost City of Gold as the Inca princess.

In 2020, Kilcher joined Yellowstone to play Angela Blue Thunder across the last three seasons of the show.

In 2022, Kilcher appeared in Channing Tatum's directorial debut, Dog, as Niki, the estranged wife of Tatum's character. Kilcher will produce and star in the upcoming film Yesteryear alongside Scott Haze, Wes Studi and Nick Cassavetes.

== Activism ==
Kilcher speaks on behalf of causes related to environmental justice and human rights. She has been a speaker for organizations such as Amnesty International, the International Forum on Globalization, Amazon Watch IFIP and the United Nations panel discussions titled "Indigenous Peoples: Human Rights, Dignity and Development with Identity", in collaboration with the Declaration on the Rights of Indigenous Peoples.

She is involved with several NGOs and organizations, such as youth ambassador for Amnesty International (Global Youth Ambassador for Woman's Rights), AIDESEP (spokesperson and voice), Interethnic Association for the Development of the Peruvian Rainforest Federations, the Community School for the Arts foundation (volunteer/spokesperson) and Thursdays Child (youth counselor) Turning The Tides (volunteer/spokesperson), Save America's Forests, IDEM (South Dakota Youth Project) and is a spokesperson for the American Literacy Campaign.

In 2010, Kilcher set up her own human rights and environmental organization "On-q Initiative", to connect young Hollywood with youth activist leaders and projects from around the world in support of environmental sustainability, corporate accountability, and basic human rights.

On June 11, 2009, she visited Lima to support indigenous peoples' rights in the Amazon in Bagua, Peru. In 2007, Kilcher won the Brower Youth Award, an environmental award, for her work in persuading Occidental Petroleum to withdraw from the Peruvian Amazon valley. She also received the Young Hollywood Green Award.

On June 1, 2010, Kilcher and her mother were arrested after Kilcher chained herself to the gates in front of the White House in Washington, D.C. while her mother poured black paint on her to signify oil. They were protesting President Barack Obama's meeting with Peruvian President Alan García, accusing the latter of selling land in the Amazon rainforest to corporations while suppressing indigenous protests. Both were charged with disorderly conduct. The charges were dropped on June 6, 2011, after the two completed community service.

On September 4, 2015, Kilcher was part of a group that sang "Love Song to the Earth". The song aims at raising awareness of climate change, with proceeds benefiting Friends of the Earth (US) and the United Nations Foundation. She and several "Love Song" singers performed in Washington, D.C. before Pope Francis' address to the U.S. Congress.

== Personal life ==
Kilcher has two brothers. Her first cousin once removed is the singer Jewel.

Her mother Saskia Kilcher is the daughter of Ray "Pirate" Genet, a Swiss mountaineer who later immigrated to the United States, and Wurtilla Dora "Wurzy" Kilcher, who was born in Alaska to Swiss immigrant parents. Kilcher's great-grandfather was Yule F. Kilcher, a member of the Alaska Senate and delegate to the Alaskan constitutional conference.

=== Fraud charges ===
In 2018, Kilcher severely injured her neck and shoulder during the filming of Dora and the Lost City of Gold. She received disability benefits from the insurance company after being treated for her injuries by third-party doctors. In May 2022, Kilcher was charged with alleged workers' compensation fraud after an investigation found that she had filmed scenes for the television series Yellowstone before receiving $96,838 in disability benefits. She pled not guilty at her arraignment in May. Variety reported that she was due to appear in court on August 7, 2022. In February 2023, all charges were dropped.

=== Avatar lawsuit ===
On 5 May 2026, Kilcher filed a lawsuit against film director James Cameron and The Walt Disney Company, alleging that the former used her likeness, specifically a photo of her face from The New World (2005), as the basis for the design of the character Neytiri in the Avatar franchise without obtaining her consent or compensating her. The lawsuit refers to an interview of James Cameron by Konbini, posted on the Konbini youtube channel on April 11, 2024, in which he refers to a promotional photo from The New World as "inspiration" for Neytiri's face.

== Filmography ==
=== Film ===
Q'orianka Kilcher film credits
Year	Film	Role	Notes
2000	How the Grinch Stole Christmas	Little Choir Member	
2005	The New World	Pocahontas	
2009	The People Speak	Herself	Documentary film
2009	Princess Kaiulani	Princess Ka'iulani	
2011	Shouting Secrets	Pinti	
2013	The Power of Few	Alexa	Also producer; direct-to-video
2015	Ben & Ara	Gabrielle	
2015	Sky	Missy	
2017	Hostiles	Elk Woman	
2017	The Vault	Susan Cromwell	Direct-to-video
2017	Te Ata	Te Ata	
2019	Dora and the Lost City of Gold	Inca Princess Kawillaka	
2020	Color Out of Space	Mayor Tooma	
2022	Dog	Niki	
2024	The Life of Chuck	Ginny Krantz	
2024	The Unholy Trinity	Running Cub	
TBA	As Deep as the Grave	TBA	Post-production

=== Television ===
Q'orianka Kilcher television credits
Year	Title	Role	Notes
2010	Sons of Anarchy	Kerrianne Telford	Recurring role, 4 episodes
2011	Neverland	Aaya	Miniseries, 2 episodes
2012	Firelight	Caroline Magabo	Television film
2012	The Killing	Mary / Maid	2 episodes
2012	Longmire	Ayasha Roundstone	Episode: "Unfinished Business"
2013	The Birthday Boys	Beautiful Native	Episode: "Rock and Roll"
2018	The Alienist	Mary Palmer	Main role, 10 episodes
2019	Drunk History	LaNada Means	Episode: "National Parks"
2020	Yellowstone	Angela Blue Thunder	Recurring role, 4 episodes
2022	Spirit Rangers	'Ayatulutul (voice)	Episode: "Caterpillar Camp"

== Awards and nominations ==
Q'orianka Kilcher has received numerous awards and nominations throughout her acting career, particularly for her breakthrough performance in The New World (2005) and her work in Native American and independent films. Her recognition spans across mainstream film awards, Native American cultural organizations, and environmental activism honors.

=== Film and television awards ===
Accolades for Q'orianka Kilcher
Year	Award	Category	Film/Work	Result
2005	National Board of Review	Breakthrough Performance by an Actress	The New World	Won
2005	New York Film Critics Circle	Best Actress	The New World	Nominated
2006	ALMA Award	Outstanding Actress in a Motion Picture	The New World	Won
2006	Critics Choice Awards	Best Young Actress	The New World	Nominated
2006	Chicago Film Critics Association	Most Promising Performer	The New World	Nominated
2006	Online Film Critics Society	Best Breakthrough Performance	The New World	Nominated
2006	Young Artist Award	Best Performance in a Feature Film (Comedy or Drama) – Leading Young Actress	The New World	Nominated
2006	First Americans in the Arts	Trustee Award		Won
2009	Young Hollywood Awards	Young Hollywood Green Award	Environmental activism	Won
2010	Women Film Critics Circle	Invisible Woman Award	Princess Kaiulani	Won
2011	American Indian Film Festival	Best Supporting Actress	Shouting Secrets	Nominated
2011	Washington DC Area Film Critics Association	Best Breakthrough Performance	The New World	Nominated
2012	Philadelphia FirstGlance Film Festival	Best Ensemble Cast	Shouting Secrets	Won
2012	Red Nation Film Festival	Outstanding Performance by an Actress in a Leading Role	Shouting Secrets	Won
2015	Blow-Up International Arthouse Film Festival	Best Actress – Monica Vitti Award	Winter Light	Nominated
2016	American Indian Film Festival	Best Actress	Te Ata	Nominated
2016	Native American Film Festival of the Southeast	Best Actress	Princess Kaiulani	Won
2016	Tulsa American Film Festival	Best Feature Film Actress	Te Ata	Won

=== Recognition and honors ===
Beyond formal awards, Kilcher has been recognized for her contributions to Native American representation in film and environmental activism. Her performance in The New World was noted by several major film critics' organizations, with the New York Film Critics Circle nominating her for Best Actress, tied with Zhang Ziyi for 2046 and Memoirs of a Geisha.

Her advocacy work has garnered national and international recognition, including the Young Hollywood Green Award in 2009, which she dedicated to indigenous rights activist Alberto Pizango and his organization AIDESEP. She has also received the Brower Youth Award and the Gandhi Award for her environmental and human rights activism.

Several publications and organizations have recognized Kilcher as one of the most prominent young Native American actresses in contemporary cinema, with Variety noting her among "Native American and Indigenous Actors the Oscars Should Have Recognized" for her portrayal of Pocahontas in The New World.
