= Mossy Kilcher =

American singer-songwriter

Mairiis Kilcher, better known as Mossy Kilcher, is an American singer-songwriter, homesteader, and ornithologist.

== Biography ==
Mairiis Kilcher was born near Homer, Alaska. She is the daughter of Yule F. Kilcher and sister of Atz Kilcher. Through Atz, she is the paternal aunt of singer-songwriter Jewel. As a teenager, her family took a trip to Switzerland where she was introduced to the music of Andrés Segovia. This sparked an interest in guitar.

She attended Reed College, where she was inspired by Lloyd J. Reynolds.

In 1977, she released her only album to date, Northwind Calling, under the married name Mossy Davidson. It was not a commercial success, but earned a cult reputation among folk enthusiasts.

Northwind Calling was reissued under the name Mossy Kilcher by Tompkins Square Records in 2020.
