= Alaska: The Last Frontier =

American reality television series (2011–2022)

- Title card (season 2 onwards)
- Genre: Reality show; Survival skills
- Starring: Otto Kilcher; Charlotte Kilcher; Atz Kilcher; Bonnie Kilcher-Dupree; Atz Lee Kilcher; Jane Kilcher; Eivin Kilcher; Eve Kilcher; Shane Kilcher
- Narrated by: Bray Poor; Hugo Speer
- Country of origin: United States
- Original language: English
- No. of seasons: 11
- No. of episodes: 176

Production
- Executive producers: Daniel Soiseth; Grant Kahler; Cameo Wallace; Philip Day
- Production location: Fritz Creek, Alaska
- Camera setup: Multiple
- Running time: Approx. 44 min (excluding commercials)

Original release
- Network: Discovery Channel
- Release: December 29, 2011 – November 13, 2022

Alaska: The Last Frontier is an American reality television series that aired on the Discovery Channel from December 29, 2011, to November 13, 2022. The show documents the extended Kilcher family, descendants of Swiss immigrants and Alaskan pioneers, Yule and Ruth Kilcher, at their homestead 11 miles outside of Homer. By living without modern heating, the clan chooses to subsist by farming, hunting and preparing for the long winters. The Kilcher family are relatives of the singer Jewel (with Atz being her father), who has appeared on the show.

== Production ==
Production occurs throughout the year on site. The production crew is based out of California.

== Episodes ==
=== Series overview ===
Season	Episodes	Originally released	
Season	Episodes	First released	Last released
1	13	December 29, 2011	December 4, 2012
2	5	May 19, 2013	June 9, 2013
3	23	October 6, 2013	October 5, 2014
4	20	October 5, 2014	March 1, 2015
5	20	October 4, 2015	February 21, 2016
6	20	October 9, 2016	February 17, 2017
7	20	September 15, 2017	February 12, 2018
8	18	October 7, 2018	January 27, 2019
9	18	October 20, 2019	February 9, 2020
10	12	October 25, 2020	January 31, 2021
11	6	October 9, 2022	November 13, 2022

=== Season 1 (2011–12) ===
No. overall	No. in season	Title	Original release date
1	1	"Before the Freeze"	December 29, 2011
With another brutal winter approaching, and bears having killed two of the family's cattle, they are forced to pin all of their hopes of surviving the winter on one last hunting trip.
2	2	"Fueling the Fire"	January 5, 2012
The first storm of winter approaches as the family races to finish preparing for the next eight months; Atz herds cattle across flooded glacial rivers.
3	3	"Snow, Cold and Darkness"	January 12, 2012
The early winter storms have left the entire homestead unprepared. A desperate search for a newborn calf and its mother forces Otto's wife Charlotte and their son August into a night of deep snow while Otto is away helping Atz Lee cut down a tree.
4	4	"Dead Of Winter"	October 2, 2012
The extended Kilcher family struggle to get through a record-breaking harsh winter. Desperate for food, Atz Lee and Jane venture into the brutal elements in search of food, hoping that ice fishing and hunting will supply their needs. Patriarchs Otto and Atz embark on a dangerous mission to bring aid to a fellow homesteader.
5	5	"Spring Has Sprung"	October 9, 2012
Spring finally arrives on the homestead. Atz Lee enlists his father, Atz, on an early spring black bear hunt, hoping to redeem his failed hunt last fall. Meanwhile, Atz Lee's wife, Jane, endures the open seas alone while fishing for king salmon. Eivin mills lumber and takes on the first build of the season, a large chicken coop to maintain a crucial food source, after helping his wife, Eve, find a rogue cannibal hen.
6	6	"Cattle Drive"	October 16, 2012
Otto and family battle the elements and predators to drive their cattle to the summer pasture. A missing calf causes Otto and Eivin to head off for a dangerous late night rescue mission. Atz Lee and Jane build a makeshift greenhouse from cast off supplies.
7	7	"Range Riding"	October 23, 2012
Atz begins his summer range riding season to protect Otto's cattle herd. A bear menaces from the edge and a wolf invades the herd. Otto and family race the clock and the elements to gather in winter's hay crop. Eivin and Eve's cannibal hen strikes again.
8	8	"The River Wild"	October 30, 2012
The Kilchers rally and call in friends to tackle their largest project this season. They have 48 hours to build a long cattle fence and rebuild a cabin, or the treacherous river's tide will trap their barge full of critical equipment for another month.
9	9	"Something's Fishy"	November 6, 2012
With summer half over, the Kilchers head out fishing, but it's not for fun... at least, not entirely. They need hundreds of pounds of fish to eat and barter with during winter. Each couple has their own time-proven technique for catching salmon, halibut and trout.
10	10	"Legend of "Terrible Island""	November 13, 2012
Atz Lee and Eivin travel 160 miles and brave the bear stories of "Terrible Island" to hunt deer. Otto refuses to admit defeat and will use all the blackpowder he has to remove a pesky stump blocking his progress. Eve helps Charlotte solve a swarming bee problem.
11	11	"Fall Feast"	November 20, 2012
Fall arrives; the Kilchers scramble to finish their winter prep. Otto confronts a predator killing calves from inside his herd. Atz Lee and Jane catch and smoke salmon in their secret fish camp. Eivin uses a samurai sword to prepare Thanksgiving dinner.
12	12	"Life According To Otto"	November 27, 2012
Cattleman Otto Kilcher sees life a little differently. Some people think he's crazy, but he'll tell you it's just his willingness to accept whatever life brings him. Otto's sense of humor is infectious and his ingenuity inspires family and neighbor alike.
13	13	"Homestead Innovations"	December 4, 2012
[CLIP SHOW] For the Kilchers, necessity truly is the mother of invention and recycling takes on a whole new level -- from bone yard scavenges and make-do parts to tasty roadkill suppers. And it's not just the Kilcher men who have to be tough and resourceful.

=== Season 2 (2012–13) ===
No. overall	No. in season	Title	Original release date
14	1	"Till the Cows Come Home"	May 19, 2013
Late fall. Half the herd returns early from the summer grazing grounds so the Kilchers drive the rest home across icy rivers. The family rushes to finish other winter prep work but still makes time for a beach-scavenged gourmet picnic.
15	2	"Poopsicle"	May 26, 2013
Otto gets creative to beat the frozen soil when he realizes he must move the outhouse, now! Eivin takes Eve on her first deer hunt on Afognak Island, which is teeming with wild animals including awake bears. Atz and sons gather trees for a big new project.
16	3	"Eve's Hunting Dilemma"	June 2, 2013
Otto pulls porcupine quills out of a colt's tender nose. With Eivin's legal quota met, it's up to Eve to bring home more deer meat from their hunting trip, but she's conflicted about the kill. Atz and Atz Lee snare rabbits; Jane gets a lesson in rabbit skinning.
17	4	"Fall Flurry"	June 9, 2013
The Kilchers race through the last few days of fall before winter finally hits, prepping the hunter and cattleman cabins, winterizing the bee hive, sorting the root cellar, bottling raspberry mead, and creating a new field with an excavator and barge.
18	5	"Family Ties"	June 15, 2013
[CLIP SHOW] With extended scenes, added facts and fan tweets - Take a deeper look at Kilcher family history with archived footage including Yule, the family patriarch and original homesteader and his wife Ruth. Otto and Atz share parenting insights and Otto and Eivin search for gold.

=== Season 3 (2013–14) ===
No. overall	No. in season	Title	Original release date
19	1	"Cabin Fever"	October 6, 2013
After 8 months of winter, the Kilchers have cabin fever. Eivin and Atz Lee get caught overnight in the back country hunting an Alaskan delicacy. Otto uses Charlotte's ingenious idea to get an orphan calf to connect with an unwilling mother. And there's much to do with poo.
20	2	"Father-Son Ingenuity"	October 13, 2013
Family projects: Before the spring thaw floods the area, Atz Sr and his 3 sons build a bridge across a river using chainsaws and fallen logs. Otto and Eivin create two amphibious crafts from their ATVs. Meanwhile, Atz Lee and Jane build a new smokehouse.
21	3	"Spring Has Sprung"	October 20, 2013
Springtime on the homestead; Atz and the family goes on a black bear hunt; Atz Sr.'s confidence wavers; Otto gives CPR to calves; Eve plants the family garden.
22	4	"Spring Delicacy"	October 27, 2013
Atz Lee and Jane climb reefs to hunt for octopus. Jane must face her fear of heights or be trapped by the tide. Otto struggles to keep a newborn calf alive during the annual spring cattle drive. Eve gives Eivin news that will change the homestead forever.
23	5	"Parlors and Poop Chutes"	November 3, 2013
Eivin and pregnant Eve decide to finally add running water to their home, but Eivin hits more than water during the installation. Otto builds Charlotte a milking parlor but takes a faceful of fuel in the process. Atz and Atz Lee head out to hunt bear.
24	6	"Outhouses, Cow Bras and Bears, Oh My!"	November 10, 2013
Midsummer: the Kilchers scramble to make the most of 22 hrs of sunlight. Atz tracks down predators killing the herd. Otto gets creative to help a cow with an udder problem. Eivin builds an outhouse. Atz Lee and Jane are startled while fishing for salmon.
25	7	"Hunt in the Clouds"	November 17, 2013
Atz Sr, Atz Lee and Jane travel to the highest peaks to hunt for wild goat. A wasp infestation destroys Eivin and Eve's bee hive and summer honey harvest. Otto and Charlotte get creative to protect what's left of their hay crop so it will last the winter.
26	8	"Thanksgiving"	November 24, 2013
Thanksgiving on the homestead. The Kilchers come together to enjoy the fruits of their year-long labor and share each dish's story. From turkey and pumpkin pie to Homesteader pie and Yule's famous nettlebread, nothing comes easy when making this feast.
27	9	"A Prickly Situation"	December 1, 2013
A persistent porcupine nails several of the Kilchers' too-curious animals with quills. Taking them out is a painful and sometimes dangerous procedure. Atz and his family carefully jack up and move an old abandoned cabin. Eve finds her garden decimated.
28	10	"Of Moose and Men"	December 15, 2013
Atz and Atz Lee swim their horses across a chilly lake to get to bull moose hunting grounds. Bad weather and feeling under the weather won't deter them from the prize. Eivin hunts clams while Eve collects wild mushrooms. Otto and Charlotte bury a friend.
29	11	"Homestead for the Holidays"	December 22, 2013
Homestead holidays bring gifts of kindness: Otto decides to give his "Wacky Yak" to a friend, but the gift rejects the idea of being given. Atz Lee gathers lumps of coal--for the nice--as his gift. Atz deals with cows on ice to bring a friend's herd home.
30	12	"Predators and Prey"	December 29, 2013
[CLIP SHOW] Grizzly bears, wolves, and coyotes remind the Kilchers that the humans aren't always the apex predator on the homestead, but threats to the Kilcher's food supplies and livelihood also come in many other shapes and sizes and from unexpected places.
31	13	"Marital Maintenance"	January 5, 2014
With winter on their doorstep, the Kilchers race to finish their summer projects. Otto's enormous new project strains his marital bliss. Atz's horse strands him on the range. Eivin works some chicken magic. Atz Lee teaches Jane to fell a tree.
32	14	"Call of the Wild"	January 12, 2014
Otto and Eivin use a duck hunt for some last minute father-son time before Eivin becomes a dad himself. Atz and Atz Lee's father-son bonding time is less fun; they're repairing the new bridge. Jane has her own adventure: fishing--and shooting--halibut.
33	15	"Circle of Life"	January 19, 2014
Atz Lee and Eivin take a bush plane and brave bears on a remote island to hunt deer. Charlotte scrambles to save a cow that went down during birthing. A very pregnant Eve struggles with the chores while Eivin is away. Atz cleans his chimney Kilcher style. In repeats, this episode has often been referred to as 'Cycle of Life' (such as December 27, 2015 on Discovery Channel).
34	16	"Baby Kilcher Arrives"	January 26, 2014
The Kilchers work on last-minute projects before winter comes; Jane faces weather and quicksand on her first cattle drive; Eivin and Eve introduce a new Kilcher.
35	17	"Extreme Seasons"	January 26, 2014
[CLIP SHOW] The Kilchers adapt to the seasons; rescuing calves; swarms of mosquitoes; Otto tries to live down his fisherman's curse.
36	18	"Mother's Day Special"	May 11, 2014
[SPECIAL EPISODE] The Kilchers celebrate the women in their lives, including new mother Eve; Atz and Otto remember their mother.
37	19	"Father's Day Special"	June 15, 2014
[SPECIAL EPISODE] The Kilchers celebrate the men in the family and share stories about their legacy.
38	20	"Kilchers Revealed: Before the Freeze"	August 26, 2014
[SPECIAL EPISODE] S01E01 with additional clips and interviews. With another brutal winter approaching, and bears having killed two of the family's cattle, they are forced to pin all of their hopes of surviving the winter on one last hunting trip.
39	21	"Kilchers Revealed: Fueling the Fire"	September 2, 2014
[SPECIAL EPISODE] S01E02 with additional clips and interviews. The first storm of winter approaches as the family races to finish preparing for the next eight months; Atz herds cattle across flooded glacial rivers.
40	22	"Kilchers Revealed: Snow, Cold and Darkness"	September 9, 2014
[SPECIAL EPISODE] S01E03 with additional clips and interviews. The early winter storms have left the entire homestead unprepared. A desperate search for a newborn calf and its mother forces Otto's wife and their son August into a night of deep snow while Otto is away helping Atz Lee cut down a tree.
41	23	"Only on the Homestead"	October 5, 2014
[CLIP SHOW] Life on the Kilcher homestead is full of surprises. From fashioning a protection bra for a milk cow to maintaining one-of-a-kind outhouses to fending off relentless attacks from a pesky porcupine, the family shares what could happen only on the homestead!

=== Season 4 (2014–15) ===
No. overall	No. in season	Title	Original release date
42	1	"A Mild Winter"	October 5, 2014
The family faces the fallout from a warm Alaskan winter; an emergency mission to supply and secure hunting cabins; Charlotte and Jane search for a missing newborn calf.
43	2	"Moving Toward the Future"	October 11, 2014
The family struggles to move a two-ton bridge to allow for crucial access to the head of the bay; Otto and Charlotte fight a threat to their cattle.
44	3	"Spring Forward"	October 19, 2014
The family bands together to protect its livelihood; Atz Lee and Jane encounter disaster while bear hunting; Atz Sr., Bonnie and Shane defend against grizzlies.
45	4	"On The Move"	October 26, 2014
Life returns to the homestead in the spring; tensions are high on the annual Kilcher cattle drive; Otto tries to maintain control of his crew.
46	5	"Loaded for Bear"	November 2, 2014
Atz Lee and Jane have a run-in with a grizzly bear.
47	6	"Greener Pastures"	November 9, 2014
Atz Lee and Jane fish for salmon; Otto and Eivin work to contain their unruly cattle herd.
48	7	"Waste Not, Want Not"	November 16, 2014
Otto, August & Eve, Charlotte and Eivin harvest a sterile cow to stock up on meat for winter, repurposing its byproducts to make homesteader soap, and tanning its hide for building corrals. At the head of the bay, Atz Sr.'s range riding skills are tested.
49	8	"Thanksgiving On The Homestead"	November 23, 2014
Homesteaders who work together, give thanks together. Join the Kilcher family as they celebrate Thanksgiving with the friends who helped prepare the homestead for winter.
50	9	"Secrets Of The Range Rider"	November 30, 2014
At the head of the bay Atz Sr. divulges the secrets of the range rider to Atz Lee & Eivin in preparation of the future. To heat the family's cabin, Otto, Charlotte, August and Shane must transform more than 1000 pounds of metal pipe into a working chimney.
51	10	"Journey to Perl Island"	December 14, 2014
In this MEGA episode the Kilchers face their biggest challenges yet. Otto, Jane & Shane help a fellow homesteader transport a cabin to the distant and uninhabited Perl Island, but things take a sinister turn when they discover a predator on the loose.
52	11	"Christmas Kaboom!"	December 21, 2014
In true homesteader holiday spirit, the Kilchers put their own spin on a Secret Santa gift exchange: hand-making something useful for someone in the family. With gifts ranging from artillery to explosives this Christmas special is filled with surprises!
53	12	"The Ties that Bind"	December 28, 2014
[CLIP SHOW] On the homestead, a strong partnership is key. The Kilcher couples work together to ensure the homestead's survival: from having each other's back during bear hunts to surviving fishing expeditions gone awry to providing backup on building projects.
54	13	"Claims, Cans and Cabins"	January 4, 2015
Otto, Eivin & August scramble to stake a claim on 10 tons of priceless steel on a distant beach. At the head of the bay, Atz Sr. & Bonnie team up with Atz Lee and Jane to stockpile salmon for the upcoming winter. Shane & Kelli break ground on their cabin.
55	14	"A Hunt Above the Clouds"	January 11, 2015
Atz and Bonnie battle the sea; Otto, Charlotte and August come face to face with brown bears.
56	15	"Call of the Cattleman"	January 18, 2015
The Kilchers, fellow homesteaders & cattlemen pay tribute to a fallen friend by driving over 100 cattle back home. Atz Lee winterizes the Hunter's Cabin, preparing to move further off the homestead. Jane & Eve's halibut fishing trip ends with a bang.
57	16	"Fall Bear Fall"	January 25, 2015
With bear season nearly over, the pressure is on Jane & Atz as they set out for their last hunt of the year. While searching for berries, Atz Sr. & Bonnie encounter a black bear of their own. Otto & Charlotte transport precious Cargo.
58	17	"Snowy Roundup"	February 8, 2015
At the head of the bay, Atz Sr. has wild game in his sights. Otto & Charlotte face disaster as the tides overpower the herd on the 30-mile journey to the homestead. Atz Lee & Jane tackle a long-overdue task to secure their cabin for the winter.
59	18	"Will Winter Come?"	February 15, 2015
The Kilchers finalize their winter preparations; Eivin, Atz Lee, Jane and Shane hunt for deer.
60	19	"Hardcore Homesteading"	February 22, 2015
[CLIP SHOW] Eivin and Atz Lee acquire meat on Shuyak Island; Otto and Eivin use the excavator; Eivin undertakes a construction job in order to supply water to Eve.
61	20	"The Super Bull Special"	March 1, 2015
[CLIP SHOW] From chaotic calves to super bulls, the Kilcher's cattle is the lifeblood of the homestead. Super bull 13-08 survives near-death experiences. Otto transports a new bull to the head of the bay. Atz Sr gives Atz Lee & Eivin lessons in how to ride the range.

=== Season 5 (2015–16) ===
No. overall	No. in season	Title	Original release date
62	1	"Big Changes"	October 4, 2015
The Kilchers confront the realities of the changing Alaskan climate; and Atz Lee enlists Atz Sr., Otto, Eivin, Bonnie and Jane to help with his dream to build an all-new and remote homestead.
63	2	"Blood, Sweat & Beers"	October 11, 2015
The Kilchers team up to tame the land after a winter of record-setting warm temperatures. As Otto & Eivin tackle turning raw wilderness into a source of food for generations to come, Atz Sr. battles the elements and a menace at the head of the bay.
64	3	"Fear and Floating"	October 18, 2015
Spring arrives on the homestead. Included: Atz and Atz Lee attempt to tame wild stallions at the head of the bay; at the same time, Otto, Eivin, Charlotte and Jane must innovate to protect their calves and overcome threats to their herd.
65	4	"Calling All Bears"	October 25, 2015
Spring has sprung and there's no shortage of needs on the homestead. Atz Sr. goes bowhunting to restock dwindling food supplies. Meanwhile, Otto, Charlotte and August scramble to protect livestock at the head of the bay; and Atz Lee develops a new foothold in the wilderness.
66	5	"Mobility, Mo' Problems"	November 1, 2015
The Kilcher family brace for summer on the homestead; Atz Lee treks to forbidding Perl Island for an emergency crash course in wilderness survival; and Jane fights with creatures from the deep for food.
67	6	"One Small Flush for Man"	November 8, 2015
As spring draws to a close, Otto and August dig into a monumental plumbing project. Included: Eivin attempts to help, but loses control of his truck; Atz Sr. searches for two predators threatening the Kilcher property; Atz Lee and Jane give Shane a hand with his cabin.
68	7	"Homestead Harships"	November 15, 2015
[CLIP SHOW] The challenges of living on the remote and rugged Kilcher homestead are sometimes unforgiving. Life in this raw, untamed wilderness means keeping family close and firearms closer. This episode uses existing footage from previous shows, with the last few minutes devoted to previewing the rest of Season 5.
69	8	"Olden Days, Olden Ways"	November 22, 2015
In this year's Thanksgiving special, the Kilchers pay tribute to the family's patriarch and matriarch, Yule and Ruth, by preparing a feast using strictly old-fashioned methods.
70	9	"No Rain, Big Pain"	November 29, 2015
A hot summer threatens the Kilcher cattle; Atz Lee joins forces with a remote homesteading master to learn how to tame the frontier; Jane comes face-to-face with a bear; Shane and Kelli make progress on their cabin; and Findlay gets a safe place to play.
71	10	"The Fall"	December 6, 2015
After a feverish summer of work, the Kilchers prepare for winter. Included: Eivin scales treacherous peaks to fill his freezer; Otto helps with Shane's cabin build, while it takes a perilous turn; and for Atz Lee, one fateful step leads to catastrophe.
72	11	"Hard Road Home"	December 13, 2015
Family and friends endure unexpected adversity. Included: Otto and Charlotte's urgent rescue mission to Halibut Cove brings jeopardy on the seas; and on the homestead, Atz Sr., Eivin, Shane and Nikos come together in a massive effort to help Atz Lee.
73	12	"A Very Kilcher Christmas"	December 19, 2015
Tis the season on the homestead for the Kilchers to create homemade gifts for their significant others. Otto surprises with an explosive gift to Charlotte, Jane builds a musical present for Atz Lee and Eivin constructs a dual-use vehicle for Eve and Findlay.
74	13	"Cycle of Life"	December 26, 2015
[CLIP SHOW] The cycle of life on the homestead is continuous. Otto & Charlotte attempt to resuscitate a stillborn calf while Eve learns that taking life during a hunt isn't easy. The Kilchers say goodbye to Bruce Willard as Eivin & Eve welcome new life with Findlay.
75	14	"Recovery Road"	January 3, 2016
As fall comes to a close, Atz Lee confronts the reality of recovering from his accident. To feed their families, Eve and Jane venture miles at sea in search of massive halibut. The rush to complete the fall harvest puts Eve and Otto in harm's way.
76	15	"New Beginnings"	January 10, 2016
The homestead is brewing with new beginnings. Sparks fly between Otto & Charlotte while building a staircase to prepare for the winter. Atz Lee crosses a critical bridge on his road to recovery & Eivin & Eve welcome the newest member of the Kilcher family.
77	16	"Do or Die"	January 17, 2016
The Kilchers find themselves unprepared for winter's arrival. Led by Otto & Charlotte, the family's cattle trek a cold & deadly path. Shane risks losing a year's progress on his unfinished cabin, while the family embarks in two massive hunts.
78	17	"The Last Straw"	January 24, 2016
Otto receives a terrifying house call, and the prognosis is grim. Atz Lee's return to the Hunter's Cabin is rudely interrupted, and he turns to a veteran homesteader for help. The Kilchers join forces to protect Shane's cabin from winter's fury.
79	18	"Surviving the Seasons"	January 24, 2016
[CLIP SHOW] Highlights of the series are presented, including a fishing trip in freezing weather; a mission to the bay in Spring; and a fall hunt.
80	19	"The Lost Episode"	February 14, 2016
A never-before-seen lost episode travels back to before Atz Lee's near-fatal accident, as he planned a surprise ceremony to renew his vows with Jane at the head of the bay. Other Kilchers struggle while preparing for the big event.
81	20	"Truth Be Told"	February 21, 2016
A behind the scenes episode relives the most memorable moments with previously-unseen footage, proving that they're not crazy- they're Kilchers. Viewer questions are answered & Atz Sr. & Atz Lee perform the premiere of a song chronicling their family.

=== Season 6 (2016–17) ===
No. overall	No. in season	Title	Original release date
82	0	"Epic Adventures"	October 9, 2016
[CLIP SHOW] For the Kilcher family, life in Alaska is a series of epic adventures. Whether it's a high altitude hunt, a perilous journey to work, or risking it all to help a neighbor in need, nothing they do is for the faint of heart.
83	1	"The Great Kilcher Quake"	October 16, 2016
A massive earthquake hits Southern Alaska and the Kilcher family scrambles to recover. They fight to re-open vital access roads. Atz Lee races towards his dream of a new remote homestead to aid in recovery, creating waves with his wife, Jane.
84	2	"Shattered Shelter"	October 16, 2016
Jane, Otto and Charlotte mend the damages to their hay barn; Atz Lee and Atz Sr. collect lumber for building their new homestead; Bonnie builds a new greenhouse.
85	3	"Stranded"	October 23, 2016
Still reeling from the earthquake, the Kilchers rush to make headway on time sensitive projects. Otto, Charlotte, and Eivin travel to rescue a family relic. The first fishing trip of the year leaves Eve and Jane lost at sea.
86	4	"Killer Repairs"	October 30, 2016
With Otto's surgery looming, the rush to complete projects becomes urgent. The herd's food supply is threatened. Atz Lee and Jane reunite after a month apart when he brings her to his new homestead for the very first time. She's less than impressed.
87	5	"Under the Knife"	November 6, 2016
After years of procrastination, Otto goes under the knife. While Charlotte waits, Jane is left to take care of the farm and delivers her first calf alone. Eivin and Atz Lee scout the Head of the Bay, but their findings won't ease Otto's concerns.
88	6	"One Man Short"	November 13, 2016
With Otto recovering from surgery, Levi comes to Alaska to lead the annual Spring cattle drive with Eivin. Otto's unwillingness to step aside puts him in danger. Atz and Atz Lee are forced to test their survival skills in the Alaskan backcountry.
89	7	"Kilchergiving"	November 20, 2016
It's Thanksgiving on the homestead and the Kilchers gather for dinner at the old Family Barn. Recognizing that the homestead is a community, this year it's all about showing thanks to friends and family that have helped out this past year.
90	8	"The Prodigal Daughter Returns"	November 27, 2016
Otto risks his recovery to help save a paralyzed cow. Jane and Atz Lee put their differences aside to prepare for winter. Atz gets ready for a visit from his daughter, singer-songwriter Jewel.
91	9	"The Monster Catch"	December 4, 2016
The Kilchers attack their biggest jobs ever. The men salvage lumber for Shane's cabin. Singer Jewel and son, Kase return to the homestead. Jane trolls for the biggest fish of her life.
92	10	"When Cows Attack"	December 4, 2016
The guys reclaim lumber for Shane's cabin; Jewel saddles up again to help a neighbor; Eve makes a gruesome discovery; and Atz Lee and Jane find signs of an aggressive bear.
93	11	"Chopper Rescue"	December 11, 2016
In a dangerous homestead first, Otto flies a massive greenhouse to a new location using a helicopter. Eve takes on the role of provider and learns a new skill to feed her family, while Atz Lee risks his recovery to continue his cabin build alone.
94	12	"Homesteading For The Holidays"	December 18, 2016
The Kilchers celebrate their most unforgettable Christmas ever with a one of a kind gift exchange! They use their Kilcher ingenuity to make homemade gifts, all crafted from the heart with the spirit of Christmas.
95	13	"Bracing For Change"	January 1, 2017
Fall brings big changes to the homestead. Tensions flare between Otto and August in their last mission before August leaves for college. Atz Lee Sr., and Jane work on Atz Lee's new cabin, but Jane still has doubts. Eivin builds a special surprise.
96	14	"The Danger Zone"	January 1, 2017
For the Kilcher family, life in Alaska means facing danger at every turn. This special episode features behind-the-scenes interviews and the Kilchers reveal how they survive in the untamed Alaskan wild.
97	15	"Winter Is Coming"	January 8, 2017
The Kilchers rush to complete jobs as frigid temperatures sweep into the region; Otto and Eivin salvage the shores of Kachemak Bay; Atz Lee attempts to put a roof on his cabin before snowfall; and Charlotte and Jane encounter a predator.
98	16	"Gold Rush"	January 15, 2017
Otto pays for his hernia surgery and ends up with gold fever. Jane and Eivin search a remote island for enough deer to last the winter, and Atz Lee faces down old fears and reaches new heights as he races the freeze in order to complete his cabin.
99	17	"Hunting Season"	January 22, 2017
The Kilchers look to the future as winter looms. Atz Sr passes on vital survival knowledge, while Atz Lee embarks on a risky solo hunt to a remote and dangerous island. Eivin builds the ideal boat for his young family's adventures on the water.
100	18	"Decision Time"	January 29, 2017
Winter has arrived. Otto and Charlotte fight to round up their cattle. Atz Lee and Jane come to a decision about his cabin. Eivin and Eve take the new boat on a maiden fishing journey. Shane and Kelli brace for unexpected news about her health.
101	19	"Blood Is Thicker Than Water"	February 12, 2017
[CLIP SHOW] For the Kilchers, each day presents new conflicts from Mother Nature and one another. With unseen footage and fan questions, they show us how to survive the Alaskan wilderness and each other.
102	20	"Like Father, Like Son"	February 19, 2017
[CLIP SHOW] Every Kilcher man relies on the unique knowledge of his father. In this behind-the-scenes episode, the Kilcher men share the importance of communication between fathers and sons, especially in the face of danger.

=== Season 7 (2017–18) ===
No. overall	No. in season	Title	Original release date
103	1	"To Live and Die in AK"	September 25, 2017
In this special episode, the Kilchers answer the audience's most pressing questions about the ups and downs of life on the homestead over the last six years. They also share a sneak peek of what to expect in this exciting upcoming season.
104	2	"The Day the Homestead Almost Died"	October 2, 2017
The Kilchers are back, & with the family legacy in jeopardy, they kick off a complete homestead overhaul. Blindsided by a massive snowstorm, the family uses every piece of heavy machinery in their arsenal to ensure the survival of future generations.
105	3	"The Day the Ice Road Shattered"	October 9, 2017
The family bands together on a massive mission to rescue a tractor, but the pressure is on Otto to get it going before the ice road melts.
106	4	"The Day the Homestead Caught Fire"	October 16, 2017
Otto is forced to the edge after a chimney fire threatens to destroy his cabin. Eivin and Eve burn up dangerous brush piles threatening their family. Atz Lee and Jane embark on a dangerous ice fishing mission.
107	5	"The Day the Cattle Swarm"	October 23, 2017
Otto and Eivin race to get the barge ready for its most ambitious mission yet- moving wild buffalo. Jane and Charlotte are put to the test as they lead the Kilchers' first ever all female cattle drive.
108	6	"The Day the Buffalo Broke Free"	October 30, 2017
The Kilchers join forces to conquer big projects. Tensions flare when Otto and Jane journey to Kodiak Island to rescue a herd of wild buffalo. Eivin and Eve tackle an urgent roof repair.
109	7	"Buffalo 2, Cowboy 0"	November 6, 2017
Otto and Jane's mission to relocate a herd of wild buffalo on Kodiak Island continues. Atz Sr. ventures into the untamed Alaskan backcountry to hunt spring black bear. Atz Lee and Nikos test their firearm skills using a custom made gun range.
110	8	"The Day the Glacier Fell"	November 13, 2017
Atz Lee and Charlotte rush to save the life of a stuck cow before it's too late. A father son shrimping trip turns deadly when Otto and his sons must outrun a colossal caving glacier. Eve and Jane fish for salmon for their family.
111	9	"The Day Thanksgiving Went Mobile"	November 20, 2017
Thanksgiving dinner goes mobile! Kick off the holidays with the Kilchers, as the family shows off new upgrades to the homestead to give thanks to their home and family. Touring the new additions while sharing a feast and good times with family.
112	10	"The Day The Crane Collapsed"	November 27, 2017
Otto and August make a risky attempt to acquire a massive machine. Charlotte, Eivin, and Eve race against the tide to rescue a weak cow. And Atz Lee and Jane go kayak fishing, but reel in more than they bargained for.
113	11	"The Day Jewel Returned"	December 4, 2017
Jewel returns to the homestead for son Kase's first cattle drive. Shane faces an uncertain future with his home. And Otto and Eivin fight to save the Kilchers' prized Octagon cabin from destruction.
114	12	"Friends 'Til the End"	December 4, 2017
The Kilchers pay tribute to their most unique and skilled homesteader friends. From kilt-wearing mountain man Turkey Joe to gold mining surgeon Doc Sayer, these are the fascinating characters who have stood by the Kilchers through thick and thin.
115	13	"The Day of Triumph & Tragedy"	December 11, 2017
The Kilchers take on some of the biggest jobs in homestead history as one team tries to pick up the historic Octagon building & move it to safety while another strives to finish Shane's multi-year cabin build before winter once again stops them cold.
116	14	"Big Machines, Bigger Risks"	December 18, 2017
For 80 years, the Kilchers have relied on an arsenal of equipment, machines, and weapons, vital to their family's survival in Alaska. Today, these incredible and dangerous tools of the homestead are the only things keeping it from falling apart.
117	15	"The Day Santa Came to the Homestead"	December 18, 2017
Christmas has the Kilchers playing Secret Santa! Atz Lee makes art with fire, Eivin tries to avoid blowing himself up, Atz Sr. jams out with a shovel and Jane wraps coal for someone special. After his injury, Shane spends Christmas in the hospital.
118	16	"Hunting on Land and Sea"	January 8, 2018
Atz Lee & Atz Sr. trek in search of black bear. Eivin builds a survival motorcycle. For the first time ever, the Kilchers film themselves. Eivin & Eve take their kids on an adventure to go crabbing. Atz Senior helps a fellow veteran with a big build.
119	17	"Hunting Season Begins"	January 15, 2018
Eve butchers chickens with her children to teach them about the circle of life. Eivin builds a shelter for his trusty horse to protect it from the freeze. Atz Lee and Jane warm up their remote cabin. Atz Sr. goes on a solo hunt in the Alaskan wild.
120	18	"Hunting Season Begins"	January 15, 2018
Carving a subsistence lifestyle out of the Alaskan wilderness is a full time dirty job. In this episode, the Kilchers take a look at the stinkiest, filthiest, muddiest, and bloodiest jobs on the homestead.
121	19	"5000 Mile Hunt"	January 22, 2018
Jane and Atz senior go Elk hunting. Eivin and Jane go on a trip to hunt for deer In the meantime Otto and Mark bring the bulls back from the head of the bay.
122	20	"Homesteading: The Next Generation"	January 29, 2018
For generations, Yule Kilcher's legacy has survived on perseverance and commitment of his family and a community of fellow homesteaders. Now, in order for that dream to continue, a new generation of young homesteaders must raise up & carry the torch.
123	21	"Frontier Beasts"	February 12, 2018
With homesteaders & survivalists, take a first-hand look at the most intense, jaw-dropping, and gut-wrenching animal moments ever caught on camera. In never before seen footage, go behind-the -scenes, with the daring camera crews who capture it all.

=== Season 8 (2018–19) ===
No. overall	No. in season	Title	Original release date
124	1	"New Frontiers"	October 7, 2018
Otto and his son, Eivin, hunt for ptarmigan, a medium-sized gamebird in the grouse family; Atz Lee and Jane take a tour of Jane's past as they travel to secluded Adak Island hunting caribou; Atz Sr.'s pioneer spirit guides him to a deserted barge.
125	2	"A Predator Strikes"	October 14, 2018
Otto and Charlotte defend the property against predator attacks; Atz Lee and Jane take a trip to Lake Louise in the hopes of catching sizeable lake trout; Atz Sr. renovates his new floating homestead; Eivin recovers from a broken rib.
126	3	"Roll, Yuletide, Roll"	October 21, 2018
Atz Lee and Jane hurry to help a fellow homesteader in dire need of assistance; Atz Sr. searches for a secluded spot, where he can properly anchor his floating homestead; Otto, Eivin and Levi rebuild a homestead hot tub; Charlotte protects her herd.
127	4	"The Beach is Burning"	October 28, 2018
Otto and Eivin fight to douse a raging coal seam fire on Kilcher beach; Atz Sr. attempts the most unconventional bear hunt of his life; and Jane and Charlotte take a girl's day adventure clamming.
128	5	"Range Danger"	November 4, 2018
Otto fabricates a calf caboose for his spring cattle drive; Atz Lee and Jane install a sustainable power source at their secluded cabin; Atz Sr. creates a smoker to preserve the meat from his epic hunt; Levi renovates the cabin from his childhood.
129	6	"Bridge and a Bear"	November 11, 2018
Atz Lee fabricates a bridge and encounters a predator while spending some time in the backcountry; Otto's hay season almost comes to an abrupt end due to a broken tractor; Eivin, Eve and Bonnie bring crops to Atz Sr's floating homestead.
130	7	"A Yuletide Thanksgiving"	November 18, 2018
The members of the Kilcher family celebrate the Thanksgiving holiday on the Yuletide, Atz Sr.'s floating homestead, and each person brings a special item to share, ranging from homestead dishes to the dinner table itself.
131	8	"To Live or Die on Perl Island"	November 25, 2018
Atz Lee takes a trip to Perl Island to fabricate a homestead for a friend in need; Otto, Eivin, and Levi work to move an old workshop cabin to Otto's property and tempers flare; Tela builds a horse fence for her children.
132	9	"Earning Seven"	December 2, 2018
Singer Jewel Kilcher hosts a coming-of-age celebration on the Yuletide for her son, Kase; Otto builds a drawbridge between his cabin and his new man cave; Atz Lee battles harsh weather as he tries to help Grady build a homestead on Perl Island.
133	10	"Calling All Kilchers"	December 9, 2018
The Kilcher family mobilizes a major effort to complete Grady's Perl Island Cabin build while under the threat of an approaching typhoon; Charlotte and August makes a cat patio to keep their house cats from killing the local animals.
134	11	"Coming of Age"	December 16, 2018
Eivin takes his son, Findlay, on his first coming-of-age hunt; Atz Lee and Jane take a trip far out into the wilderness to fish for elusive, but tasty, pike; Atz Sr. makes the choice to make some upgrades to the Yuletide as cold weather approaches.
135	12	"Holly Jolly Homesteading"	December 23, 2018
The members of the Kilcher family film themselves crafting inventive homemade gifts for their first-ever "Couples Secret Santa" during the Christmas holiday in the remote area of the state of Alaska where they thrive off the land.
136	13	"Hill Country Hunt"	December 30, 2018
Atz Lee, Atz Sr., and Jane go on a horseback hunt in the foothills; Eivin fabricates a unique motorized cart for Findlay; Otto, Charlotte and August hurry to make repairs to a fence breach subsequent to their cattle making an escape.
137	14	"Wind and a Prayer"	January 6, 2019
Levi and Otto get wind power at the cabin; Atz Lee and Jane assist homesteader Mike in transforming an old city house into a quaint cabin; Tela gets help from the Kilchers as she has a hard time repairing her dry spring; August moves back home.
138	15	"Thrill of the Hunt"	January 13, 2019
The cattle roundup for the fall season takes a wild turn when a horse gets tangled in electric wire; Levi and Eivin embark on a rock-climbing expedition with the hopes of securing access to a new hunting ground; Atz Sr. and Bonnie go on a hunting date.
139	16	"Collision Course"	January 20, 2019
Otto and August seek assistance from Eivin after facing an emergency at sea; Atz Senior has to make the choice between life on the Yuletide and returning to the family homestead; Atz Lee puts Jane's homesteading skills to the ultimate test.
140	17	"High and Dry"	January 27, 2019
Otto and his crew of family and friends attempt to salvage the Constructor, a boat that holds potential for future use; Eivin takes Levi, a novice hunter, to Shuyak Island on a final hunt to stockpile deer meat for winter.

=== Season 9 (2019–20) ===
No. overall	No. in season	Title	Original release date
141	1	"New Ways On The Homestead"	October 20, 2019
With winter ending early, the Kilchers spring into action. Eivin and August struggle to resupply the head of the bay while Jane and Eve go hunting.
142	2	"Rusted And Busted"	October 27, 2019
Otto surveys the condition of his rusting barge after a winter in drydock, while Eivin and Eve use explosives to clear land for a new root cellar.
143	3	"Bears Descend"	November 3, 2019
In preparation for the spring cattle drive, Atz Lee, Otto and August survey the homestead for signs of bear and employ modern surveillance to track their movement.
144	4	"Boat Rescue Mission"	November 10, 2019
While collecting coal after a storm, Eivin and Eve find a capsized boat and look for survivors. Otto, Charlotte and August build a shelter for their calves.
145	5	"Greener Pastures"	November 17, 2019
With predators stalking the homestead, the family livestock is in danger. Atz Sr and Atz Lee plan a new pasture on Perl Island for safer grazing.
146	6	"Otto's Surprise"	November 24, 2019
Jane and Charlotte trek through bear country to protect their herd. Three generations of Kilchers build a shack on Perl Island and Otto has a surprise for Charlotte.
147	7	"Homestead Havoc"	November 24, 2019
The Kilchers reveal the dirtiest moments from their past seasons on the homestead. And, a bonus scene depicts the family's most earth-shattering explosion.
148	8	"Moving Mountains"	December 1, 2019
Things get explosive when the Kilchers expand a road with the help of a detonation expert. Atz Sr and Bonnie brave the backcountry to salvage vital resources.
149	9	"Thanksgiving Rescue"	December 8, 2019
As Thanksgiving approaches, the Kilchers prepare for a feast. Eivin and Eve rescue a baby seal on the beach and there's a beetle infestation on the homestead.
150	10	"Making Hay The Kilcher Way"	December 15, 2019
Eivin and August make a unique hay baler that will ease their load, if it doesn't set them on fire! And, the family go salmon fishing at the Copper River.
151	11	"Homestead Haul"	December 22, 2019
For the first time since blasting Kilcher Road, Eivin tries to haul a huge pole barn to his homestead. Jewel and her son visit, and August builds a unique outhouse.
152	12	"Tangled In The Tide"	December 29, 2019
Eivin and Atz Sr. get tangled as the tide comes in. Atz Lee and Jane teach the next generation of Kilchers to fish. Otto and Charlotte give Eve an amazing gift.
153	13	"Christmas Wonderland Woes"	January 5, 2020
A winter wonderland is threatened when warm weather brings rain to the homestead. The Kilchers are determined the storm won't ruin their Christmas plans.
154	14	"Dangerous Waters"	January 12, 2020
Eivin and Eve launch a risky clean-up operation to clear a tangle of old nets endangering fish in a nearby river. And, Atz Sr. goes on a solo hunt for moose.
155	15	"Preserving The Old Ways"	January 19, 2020
Eivin guides August on his first-ever deer hunt, and Etienne goes on his first big game hunt. Plus, Atz Sr. and Otto attempt to reassemble a historic barn.
156	16	"Fall Scramble"	January 26, 2020
The Kilchers get busy on outdoor projects to prepare for the winter months. Atz Sr., Eivin and Nikos scavenge for lumber while Atz Lee and Etienne mill wood.
157	17	"Legacies Live On"	February 2, 2020
Eivin and Eve build an epic homestead-style treehouse. Atz Lee, Jane and Etienne stock their freezers with trout while Otto and August refurbish an old tractor.
158	18	"Chasing Caribou"	February 9, 2020
Jane heads to the Arctic Circle hoping to bag a caribou before winter. Meanwhile, Otto, Eivin, Charlotte and August wrap up the season's final cattle drive.

=== Season 10 (2020–21) ===
No. overall	No. in season	Title	Original release date
159	1	"A Whole New Frontier"	October 25, 2020
160	2	"Homestead Closed"	November 1, 2020
161	3	"Emergency!"	November 8, 2020
162	4	"I Don't Want to Die Today"	November 15, 2020
163	5	"We're Marooned"	November 22, 2020
164	6	"Land of the Midnight Sun"	November 29, 2020
165	7	"Tsunami Evacuation"	December 6, 2020
166	8	"Fighting Fire with Fire"	January 3, 2021
167	9	"Backyard Prey"	January 10, 2021
168	10	"Homestead Heartache"	January 17, 2021
169	11	"Breaking Point"	January 24, 2021
170	12	"Fox Cabin Finale"	January 31, 2021

=== Season 11 (2022) ===
No. overall	No. in season	Title	Original release date
171	1	"He Might Die"	October 9, 2022
172	2	"An Uncertain Recovery"	October 16, 2022
173	3	"Paying it Forward"	October 23, 2022
174	4	"Eivin's New Future"	October 30, 2022
175	5	"August's Choice"	November 6, 2022
176	6	"The Next Chapter"	November 13, 2022

== Awards and nominations ==
- 2013 CableFAX's Program & Top Ops Awards - Best Show or Series – Professions – NOMINATION
- 2013 Communicator Awards – Award of Distinction - WINNER
- 2013 Telly Award - Bronze - Main Title – WINNER
- 2014 Emmy Awards - Outstanding Cinematography For Reality Programming - NOMINATION
- 2014 Emmy Awards - Outstanding Unstructured Reality Program - NOMINATION

== Bear hunting incident ==
In 2015, Atz Lee, his wife Jane, and a company involved in the production of the show were charged with using a helicopter as part of bear hunt while filming an episode in 2014. Using any aircraft to spot prey, or using a helicopter in any way as part of a hunt is illegal in Alaska. All three pleaded not guilty. The matter was on hold due to Atz Lee being seriously injured in a hiking accident, but while the production company Wilma TV was fined $17,500, the charges against the Kilchers themselves were eventually dismissed.
