= Our House (2018 film) =

2018 horror film

- Theatrical release poster
- Directed by: Anthony Scott Burns
- Screenplay by: Nathan Parker
- Based on: Ghost from the Machine by Matt Osterman
- Produced by: Ulf Israel; Martin Katz; Lee Kim; Karen Wookey
- Starring: Thomas Mann; Nicola Peltz; Kate Moyer; Percy Hynes White
- Edited by: Erin Deck
- Music by: Mark Korven
- Production companies: Prospero Pictures; Resolute Films and Entertainment; Senator Film Produktion; XYZ Films; Ulterior Productions
- Distributed by: IFC Midnight; Elevation Pictures
- Release dates: July 22, 2018 (Fantasia Film Festival); July 27, 2018
- Running time: 90 minutes
- Countries: Canada; Germany; United States
- Language: English

Our House is a 2018 horror film directed by Anthony Scott Burns from a screenplay by Nathan Parker. The film is a remake of the 2010 film Ghost from the Machine, written and directed by Matt Osterman. It stars Thomas Mann, Kate Moyer, Nicola Peltz and Percy Hynes White. It was released in the United States and Canada on July 27, 2018 by IFC Midnight and Elevation Pictures.

== Plot ==
Ethan returns home from college to visit his parents and younger siblings, Becca and Matt. A passionate inventor, he leaves early to conduct an on-campus experiment, but promises his disappointed parents he'll prioritize the family on his next break.

Ethan has invented a machine called ELI that is designed to create wireless electrical power. However, as his project lacks university authorization, Ethan, his girlfriend Hannah, and another friend must sneak into the university lab to perform his experiments with it. When they activate the device, they fail to notice a black, smoky mass emanating from the equipment. The trial causes a campus-wide blackout, and the trio flee.

The next morning, Ethan learns that his parents have died in a traffic accident, and he returns home to care for Becca and Matt. He begins a part-time job, and continues to work on ELI in his spare time. After he performs further experiments, strange things begin to occur through the house. The siblings come to believe that Ethan's machine is allowing their parents' spirits to make contact with them. When a supernatural entity appears, it tells them that the machine is harnessing spiritual energy, and that increasing its power will allow both of their parents to appear.

Ethan enlists the help of his neighbour, Tom, a widower, to illegally tap into the street's power supply. Becca claims to have given her doll away to comfort a new friend, Alice, who fears a man named Henry. The supernatural events increase and become menacing. Tom begins to exhibit odd behaviour, warning Ethan that the machine's effect has expanded beyond the house. Hannah views footage of the first experiment and shows Ethan a ghostly, female silhouette, and they ask an elderly neighbour, Marie, about the house's previous occupants. Marie tells them about Alice, a child who disappeared from the house, whom Marie thinks was killed by Henry, her foster father.

Becca is lured into the basement by the doll and dragged into a large chest. Ethan informs Matt that the ghosts are not their parents, and Hannah and Matt look for Becca while Ethan goes to switch ELI off. However, he finds that Tom has taken the machine to communicate with his wife's spirit, Ethan breaks in to Tom's house and a fight ensues. Matt and Hannah find Becca in a hidden underground room, but all three are overcome by murderous ghosts.

After Ethan explains that the spirit isn't his wife, Tom releases him. The ghost then turns on Tom and drags him away. Ethan smashes the machine with a baseball bat, saving his family, as well as Tom.

As the siblings prepare to move to a new home, Becca is given the doll she'd intentionally left in the house to keep Alice company. She races in to return it before they leave.

Ethan and Hannah unpack boxes in their new home with the help of Matt and Becca, and the four of them eat take out dinner together. The film ends as the doll is seen peeking out from inside a packing box.

== Cast ==
- Thomas Mann as Ethan Lightman
- Percy Hynes White as Matt Lightman
- Kate Moyer as Becca Lightman
- Nicola Peltz as Hannah
- Robert B. Kennedy as Tom
- Lucius Hoyos as Dag
- Marcia Bennett as Marie
- Allison Hossack as Lila Lightman
- John Ralston as Richard Lightman
- Carlyn Burchell as Ms. Nash
- Neil Whitely as Jacob
- Aaron Hale as Adnan

== Production ==
In August 2011, Universal Pictures acquired the rights to remake the 2010 film Ghost from the Machine. Gary Shore signed on as director with Moon screenwriter Nathan Parker writing the script. By January 2016, Shore had left the project and was replaced by Anthony Scott Burns. Thomas Mann was set to star in the film with John Davis, Derek Dauchy, Nick Spicer and Kyle Franke producing the film under their Davis Entertainment and XYZ Films banners, respectively. In May 2016, Nicola Peltz joined the cast of the film, with Lee Kim, Marty Katz, and Ulf Israel joining the film as producers. In June 2017, Mark Korven was announced to compose the film's score.

=== Filming ===
Principal photography began in May 2016 in Port Hope, Ontario, Canada and concluded the following month, with a tentative release date set for 2017.

=== Post-production ===
In June 2017, Electric Youth announced a new album titled Breathing based on a "lost" film of the same name. The band had collaborated with Burns on the film, that was intended to "reinvent the horror genre", which was changed completely in post production. According to band members Austin Garrick and Bronwyn Griffin, Burns had left the project during post production due to creative differences, the duo soon left afterward. Dennis Harvey of Variety had seemingly confirmed that Breathing was an earlier title used for Our House. Harvey also points to the lack of a director of photography credit as further evidence of production troubles. While promoting Come True, both Burns and Electric Youth confirmed the production disputes, with Burns claiming he lost all his representation after quitting the film.

== Release ==
In June 2016, Elevation Pictures acquired Canadian distribution rights to the film. In February 2018, IFC Midnight acquired U.S. distribution rights to the film. The film was released in the United States and Canada on July 27, 2018.

== Reception ==
Sales of Our House DVD/Blu-ray releases have cashed $1,732.On the review aggregator website Rotten Tomatoes, 62% of 26 critics' reviews are positive. The website's consensus reads: "Our House sits on a solid foundation of genuine pathos, even if the storytelling structure tends to be frustratingly rickety in spots." Metacritic, which uses a weighted average, assigned the film a score of 45 out of 100, based on 6 critics, indicating "mixed or average" reviews.
