= Ghost from the Machine =

- Directed by: Matt Osterman
- Written by: Matt Osterman
- Produced by: Jennifer Kramer
- Starring: Sasha Andreev; Matthew Feeney; Max Hauser
- Cinematography: Adam Honzl
- Edited by: Mark Anderson
- Music by: Wojciech Golczewski
- Production company: Hodag Films
- Distributed by: XYZ Films; Screen Media Films
- Release date: July 16, 2010 (Fantastic Fest)
- Country: United States
- Language: English
- Budget: $25,000

Ghost from the Machine is a 2010 independent supernatural thriller written and directed by Matt Osterman. It was filmed in and around Minneapolis, Minnesota, and made its festival debut at the Fantasia Festival in Montreal, Canada. Ghost from the Machine was also an official Independent Feature Project Labs participant.

Ghost from the Machine was originally titled, and is known internationally as, Phasma Ex Machina.

== Plot ==
After his parents die, Cody, an inventor, becomes obsessed with finding a way to contact them once again. Tom, a local scientist who lost his wife, becomes interested in the project and helps Cody. Together, they discover that Cody's invention can cause ghosts to momentarily reappear as flesh and blood. Tom and Cody become further obsessed with maximizing the amount of time that they can spend with their loved ones, only to discover that a pair of dangerous murderers have also been rematerialized by the machine. Tom and Cody soon realize that the only way to see their loved ones is to put themselves and others at risk. As they debate the ethical and philosophical ramifications of the machine, the killers grow stronger and attempt to kill Cody's younger brother. Ultimately, Cody is able to rescue his brother, and Cody and Tom destroy the machine.

== Cast ==
- Sasha Andreev as Cody
- Matthew Feeney as Tom
- Max Hauser as James

== Release ==
Ghost from the Machine premiered as Phasma Ex Machina at the Fantasia Festival on July 7, 2010. In 2011, Screen Media Films then acquired and retitled it. It was released on DVD and video on demand on August 2, 2011.

== Reception ==
Dennis Harvey of Variety called it "an impressive feature debut" that favors "a slow build and minimal violence over blunt scare tactics". Andrew Mack of Twitch Film compared it to Primer and called it "a quiet and slowly chilling ghost story that lingers around the fringes of your nerves." Matt Coker of OC Weekly cited the strong performances and well-written relationships made it a stand-out film at the Anaheim International Film Festival. Brad Miska of Bloody Disgusting rated it 3.5/5 stars and called it thematically confused but "a wonderfully tragic supernatural flick that's both captivating and 'smart'."

=== Awards ===
Ghost from the Machine was the winner of the Flyway Film Festival and was voted "Best of the Fest" at the Arizona Underground Film Festival.

== Remake ==
Deadline reported in August 2011 that Universal Pictures acquired remake rights; director Gary Shore and writer Nathan Parker were attached. By January 2016, Shore had left the project and was replaced by Anthony Scott Burns. The remake was released in 2018 with the title Our House.
