= Nicola Peltz =

American actress (born 1995)

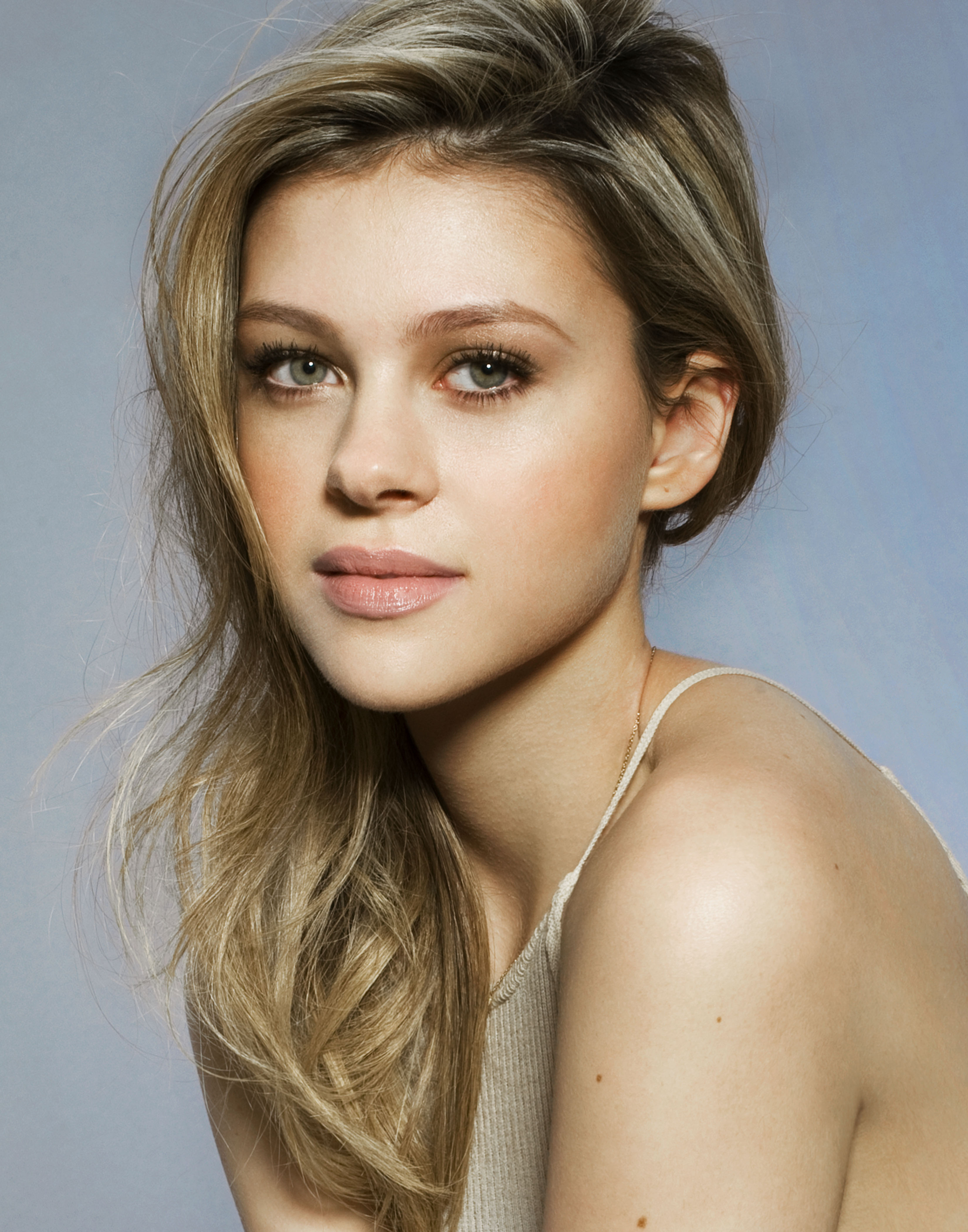
- Peltz in 2015
- Born: Nicola Anne Peltz; January 9, 1995 (age 31); Westchester County, New York, U.S.
- Occupation: Actress
- Years active: 2003–present
- Spouse: Brooklyn Beckham (m. 2022)
- Father: Nelson Peltz
- Relatives: Will Peltz (brother)

Nicola Anne Peltz Beckham (née Peltz; born January 9, 1995) is an American actress. She is known for her roles as Katara in the film The Last Airbender (2010), Bradley Martin in the A&E drama series Bates Motel (2013–2015) and Tessa Yeager in the film Transformers: Age of Extinction (2014).

== Early life ==
Nicola Anne Peltz was born on January 9, 1995, in Westchester County, New York, the daughter of American billionaire businessman Nelson Peltz and model Claudia Heffner. She has one sister and six brothers, including Will Peltz. She also has two half-siblings from her father's previous marriages. Her father is devoutly Jewish, and her brothers had a bar mitzvah.

== Career ==
Peltz Beckham made her film debut as Mackenzie in the Christmas comedy Deck the Halls (2006). The following year, she appeared in a Manhattan Theatre Club production of Blackbird. She later co-starred as Becki in the comedy film Harold (2008), and in June 2008, she appeared in the music video for Miley Cyrus's single "7 Things." Two years later, she portrayed Katara in the fantasy adventure film The Last Airbender (2010), directed by M. Night Shyamalan.

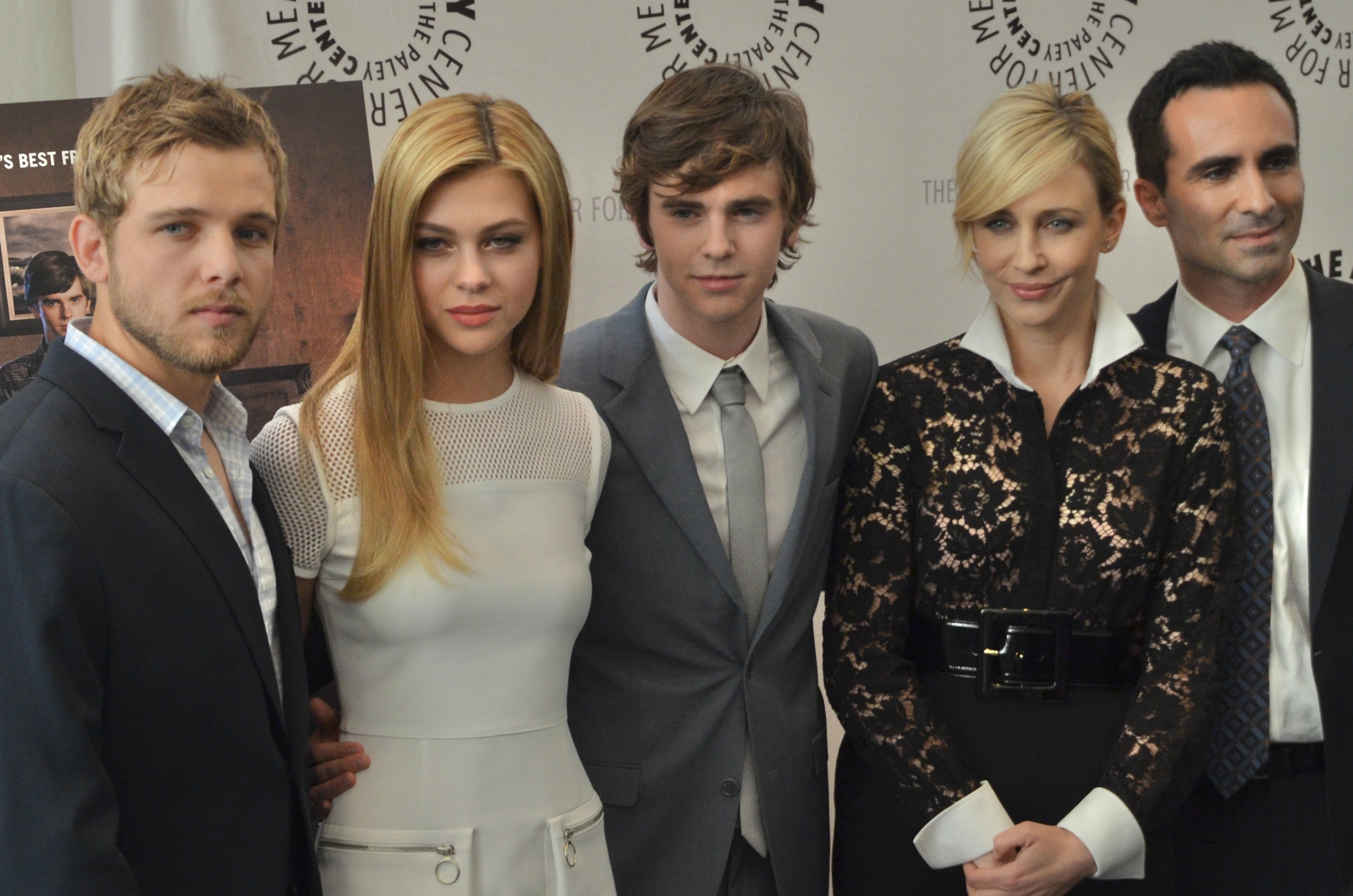
Peltz Beckham and co-stars at the premiere of Bates Motel in 2013

In 2013, Peltz Beckham began appearing as part of the main cast in A&E's drama-thriller series Bates Motel. She portrayed Bradley Martin, a love interest for the young Norman Bates. She left the main cast following the second episode of the second season, but returned as a guest star for the final three episodes of the third season. The following year, Peltz Beckham starred as Tessa Yeager in the fourth Transformers film Transformers: Age of Extinction (2014). Later that year, she appeared as Kate Miller in the teen drama film Affluenza. In October 2015, she walked the runway for Alexander Wang's final fashion show for Balenciaga at Paris Fashion Week. She then joined the cast of the dark comedy film Youth in Oregon (2016), playing Annie Gleason. Peltz Beckham appeared in the music video for Zayn Malik's single "It's You" in February 2016.

Peltz Beckham was cast as Chrissy Monroe in the Hulu drama series When the Street Lights Go On, based on a Black List script of the same name. She appeared in Alex Pettyfer's directorial debut film Back Roads and starred in the sci-fi film Our House, directed by Anthony Scott Burns. In 2019, she co-starred in the drama The Obituary of Tunde Johnson as Marley Meyers. In 2020, she portrayed Felicity in the romantic comedy Holidate.

In 2024, Peltz Beckham released her feature-film directorial debut, Lola, which was critically panned. She co-starred opposite Virginia Madsen, and the film was sold to Vertical Entertainment.

== Personal life ==
She was in a relationship with model Anwar Hadid from 2017 to 2018.

On July 11, 2020, Peltz and Brooklyn Beckham announced their engagement. On April 9, 2022, she and Beckham were married in Palm Beach, Florida, in a Jewish ceremony. Later that year, Peltz Beckham announced on Instagram that they had adopted a dog in October, and the couple encouraged fans to adopt or foster animals, which earned them a PETA 2022 award as a Pawsome Adoption Advocate.

She and her brother Will Peltz have similar Hebrew and Yiddish tattoos on their ribs. His says "family", which is written the same way in both Hebrew and Yiddish, while hers says "family first" in Yiddish.

== Filmography ==
=== Film ===
List of Nicola Peltz Beckham film credits
Year	Title	Role	Notes	Ref.
2006	Deck the Halls	Mackenzie		
2008	Harold	Becki		
2010	The Last Airbender	Katara		
2012	Eye of the Hurricane	Renee Kyte		
2014	Transformers: Age of Extinction	Tessa Yeager		
2014	Affluenza	Kate Miller		
2016	Youth in Oregon	Annie Gleason		
2017	Transformers: The Last Knight	Tessa Yeager	Uncredited voice cameo	
2018	Back Roads	Amber Altmyer		
2018	Our House	Hannah		
2019	The Obituary of Tunde Johnson	Marley Meyers		
2020	Holidate	Felicity		
2024	Lola	Lola James	Also director and writer	

=== Television ===
List of Nicola Peltz Beckham television credits
Year	Title	Role	Notes	Ref.
2013–2015	Bates Motel	Bradley Martin	Main role (season 1); recurring role (seasons 2–3)	
2016	When the Streetlights Go On	Chrissy Monroe	Pilot	
2017	Inhumans	Jane	Episode: "Behold... The Inhumans"	
2022	Welcome to Chippendales	Dorothy Stratten	Episode: "An Elegant, Exclusive Atmosphere"	
2026	The Beauty	Franny Forst (Post Beauty)	Episode: "Beautiful Betrayal"	

=== Music videos ===
List of Nicola Peltz Beckham music videos
Year	Title	Artist(s)	Ref.
2008	"7 Things"	Miley Cyrus	
2016	"It's You"	Zayn Malik	

== Awards and nominations ==
List of awards and nominations received by Nicola Peltz Beckham
Year	Nominated work	Award	Category	Result	Ref.
2011	The Last Airbender	Golden Raspberry Awards	Worst Supporting Actress	Nominated	
2014	Transformers: Age of Extinction	Young Hollywood Awards	Breakthrough Actress	Nominated	
2014	Transformers: Age of Extinction	CinemaCon Awards	Rising Star (with Jack Reynor)	Won	
2014	Transformers: Age of Extinction	Teen Choice Awards	Choice Movie: Breakout Star	Nominated	
2015	Transformers: Age of Extinction	Golden Raspberry Awards	Worst Supporting Actress	Nominated	
