= Richie Merritt =

American actor

Richie Merritt (born 2001) is an American actor. He portrayed Richard Wershe Jr. in the 2018 film White Boy Rick. He also played Malachi in the film Lola.

== Early life and education ==
Merritt is from Baltimore County, Maryland. He attended Dundalk High School. He was reportedly waiting outside the principal's office when discovered by filmmakers.

== Filmography ==
=== Film ===
Year	Title	Role	Notes
2018	White Boy Rick	Richard Wershe Jr.	
2021	Clean	Mikey	
2024	Lola	Malachi	
TBA	My New Friend Jim	TBA	Filming

=== Television ===
Year	Title	Role	Notes
2022	Euphoria	Bruce Jr.	2 episodes
