= Matt Osterman =

American independent filmmaker (born 1978)

Matthew Osterman
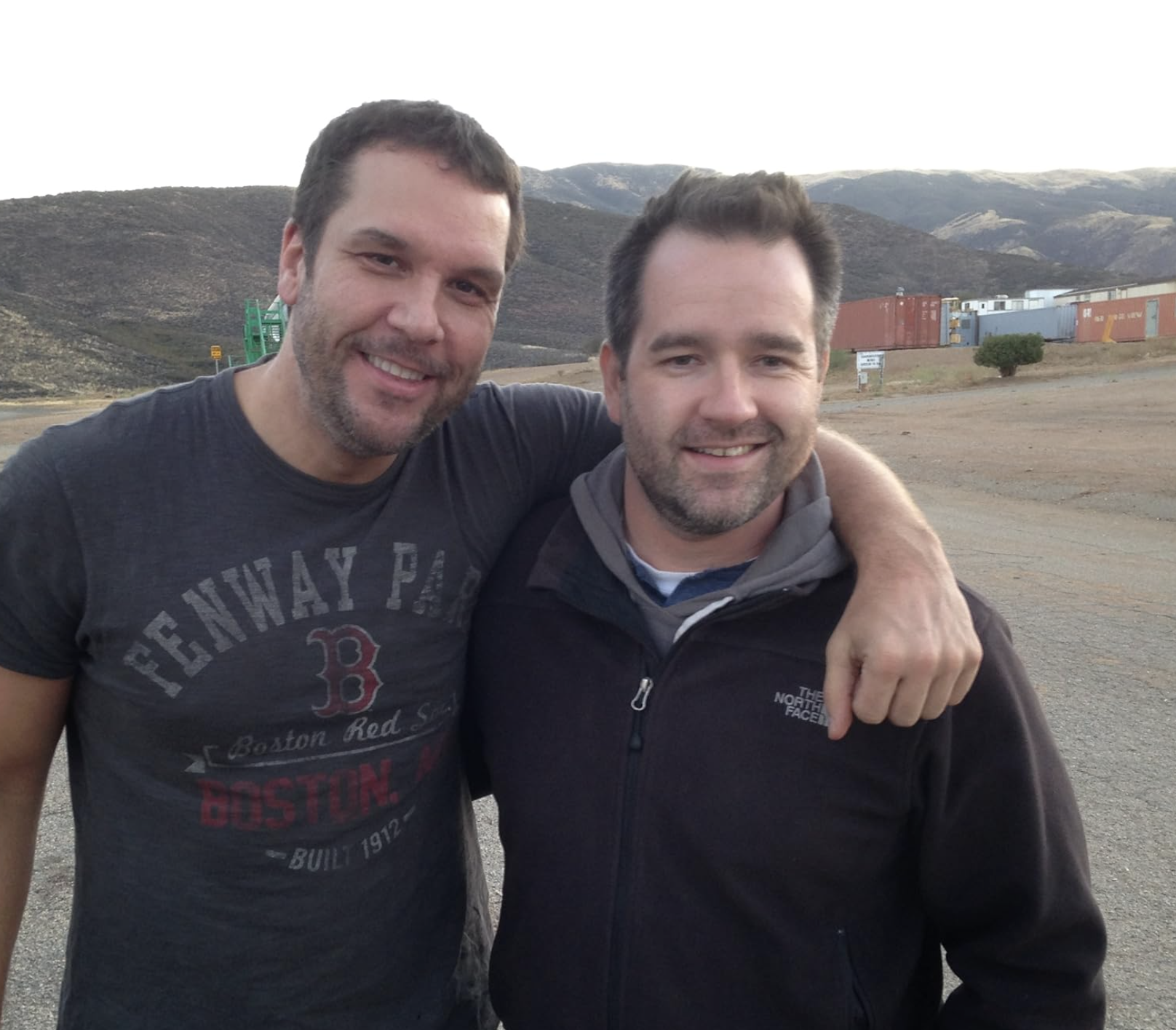
- Born: May 27, 1978 (age 47); Rhinelander, Wisconsin
- Occupation(s): Director, writer, producer, filmmaker
- Years active: 2002–present
- Website: https://mattosterman.com/

Matt Osterman (born May 27, 1978, in Rhinelander, Wisconsin) is an American independent filmmaker and Entrepreneur. He wrote and directed the films Ghost from the Machine, 400 Days, Hover and The Fence and the Fox. He currently resides in Roseville, Minnesota.

== Biography ==
Osterman began his career working with Dan Buettner on the Blue Zones project and helped him found the Quest Network. He was also research lead on National Geographic Magazine’s, "Secrets of Longevity" which was the cover story of the November 2005 edition.

He started his film career by directing and producing short films and working on the documentary Sportsfan with Aaron Lubarsky and Jon Stewart. Sportsfan aired nationally on SpikeTV and played numerous festivals all over the country.

After the documentary, he went on to write and direct Ghost From The Machine, a low-budget feature film shot in Minneapolis. Ghost From the Machine premiered at the Fantasia Film Festival and had an amazing run on Netflix. It ended up being one of ten films in the nation to be accepted into the Independent Feature Project Filmmakers Narrative Lab in 2009. In 2011, Osterman sold the remake rights of Ghost From the Machine to Universal. A few years later, Our House was produced by XYZ Films and Davis Entertainment. It was released by IFC Midnight and Elevation Pictures in 2018.

Osterman co-founded an Internet Service Provider called Northwoods Connect in 2014, a project focused on bringing high-speed internet to rural communities in Wisconsin. The company was sold to a regional provider in 2020.

Osterman's next feature film project, 400 Days, starred Brandon Routh, Caity Lotz, Ben Feldman, and Dane Cook, and was inspired by MARS-500, a psychosocial isolation experiment designed to prepare for the first crewed mission to Mars. The space thriller was acquired by Syfy films in 2015, and premiered January 12, 2016. The film generated heated discussion with audiences around the true meaning and the messages embedded within.

He then went on to direct another feature with Syfy Films, Hover (2018), a near-future Sci-Fi picture starring Cleopatra Coleman (also written by), Shane Coffey, Beth Grant, and muMs da Schemer.

His most recent feature film, The Fence and the Fox, a crime drama revolving around cryptocurrency, is set to air in the fall of 2024 and stars Noah Anderson, Ella Ma, Jeremy Davies, Frank Whaley, Tom Cavanagh and Bruce Bohne.

In addition to filmmaking, Osterman has worked extensively in the creative/branding industries, helping create over 25 brands that can be seen in Target, Best Buy, Circuit City and Dick's Sporting Goods.

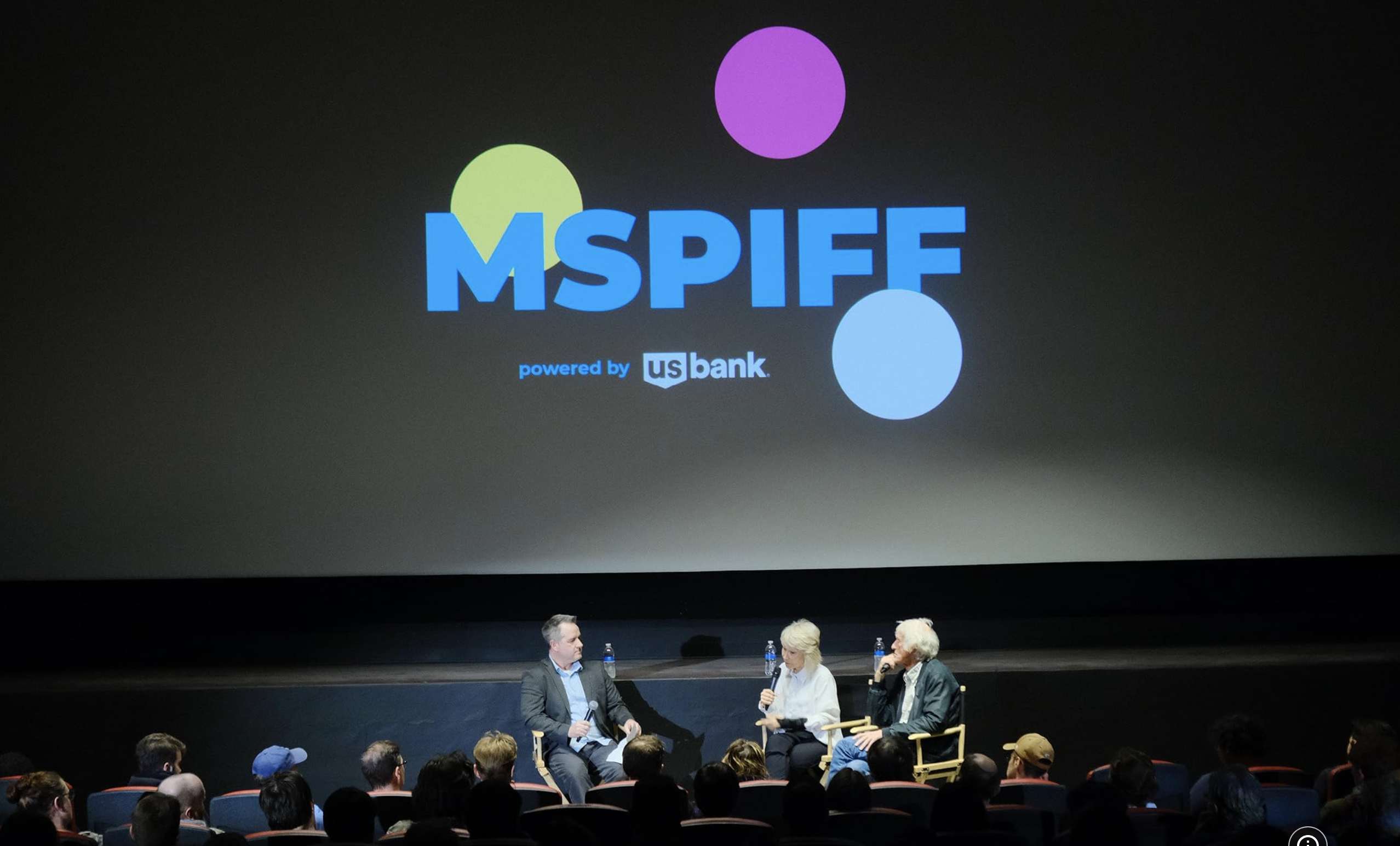
Osterman Moderates a talk with Sir Roger Deakins and James Deakins for MSPIFF 2024

Osterman currently runs a marketing firm called HeyPropellant.com and Propellant Films, a production company. He hosts the Propellant Podcast, which is published on Youtube, Apple, and Spotify.

== Filmography ==
- Sportsfan (2006) – Associate Producer
- Ghost from the Machine (2011) – Director, writer
- 400 Days (2016) – Director, writer
- Hover (2018) – Director
- The Fence and the Fox (2024) - Director, writer
