= Gary Shore =

Irish film director, producer and screenwriter

- Born: 1981 (age 44–45); Artane, Dublin, Ireland
- Education: IADT
- Occupations: Film director, producer, screenwriter
- Years active: 2006–present
- Spouse: Ciara Cullen (m. 2014)

Gary Shore (born 1981) is an Irish film director, producer and screenwriter, best known for his directorial debut film Dracula Untold. He has also directed commercials for a number of established brands such asGatorade, Adidas, and UGG.

== Early life ==
Shore was born in 1981 in Artane, Dublin, and graduated in 2006 from the National Film School.

== Career ==
Shore attended the National Film School in Dublin, Ireland. He graduated in 2006 winning the Royal Television Society Award for Best Student Drama for his short film, The Draft which he wrote, directed, and produced. Also in 2006, the Cannes International Advertising Festival nominated Shore for the prestigious Young Director Award. In 2009, he produced a faux film trailer, a science-fiction horror short film, The Cup of Tears. This short led to a bidding war in 2010 resulting in a deal with Working Title Films to develop a feature version.

In October 2012, Shore and fellow producer Jonathan Loughran founded a production company named ArtCastle Productions with offices in Dublin and Los Angeles. Later, Shore and his company were signed by the William Morris Endeavor.

In 2014, Shore made his feature film directorial debut with the action fantasy-horror film Dracula Untold based on the character Count Dracula. The film starred Luke Evans and Sarah Gadon, and was scripted by Matt Sazama and Burk Sharpless. It was released on 10 October 2014 by Universal Pictures and grossed over $215 million.

Also in 2014, Shore directed three sixty-second advertisements promoting the best-selling video game Game of War: Fire Age featuring supermodel Kate Upton reprising her in-game role as the goddess Athena.

Shore directed the "St. Patrick's Day" segment in the XYZ Films' anthology film Holidays in July 2015, which was also produced through ArtCastle. The segment stars Ruth Bradley.

He has also directed commercials for several large brands including Gatorade, Adidas, and UGG.

=== Future or canceled projects ===
On 18 May 2011 Universal and Working Title acquired the feature film rights to remake Phasma ex Machina. In August 2011, Shore was hired by Universal to direct Our House, a remake of the 2010 independent thriller film Ghost from the Machine, or Phasma Ex Machina, with Nathan Parker attached to write the script. By January 2016, Shore had left the project and was replaced by Anthony Scott Burns.

They are also working together on a feature-length version of The Cup of Tears.

In June 2014, Shore was reportedly hired to direct Gods and Men.

In November 2016, Shore was set to direct an historical epic film titled The Great Game for Cross Creek Pictures from an original screenplay by Bryan McMullin.

== Personal life ==
Shore married his long time friend Ciara Cullen in October 2014.

== Filmography ==
Short film

Year	Title	Director	Writer	Producer	Notes
2006	The Draft	Yes	Yes	Yes	
2009	The Cup of Tears	Yes	Yes	Yes	
2016	St. Patrick's Day	Yes	Yes	Yes	Segment of Holidays

Feature film

Year	Title	Director	Writer
2014	Dracula Untold	Yes	No
2023	Haunting of the Queen Mary	Yes	Yes
