= Lola (2024 film) =

Film by Nicola Peltz Beckham

- Theatrical release poster
- Directed by: Nicola Peltz Beckham
- Written by: Nicola Peltz Beckham
- Produced by: Will McCance
- Starring: Nicola Peltz Beckham; Raven Goodwin; Richie Merritt; Luke David Blumm; Trevor Long; Virginia Madsen
- Cinematography: Madeline Leach; Sevdije Kastrati (additional)
- Edited by: Nick Houy; Andrew Leven
- Music by: Mervyn Warren (score); Quincy Jones (producer)
- Production companies: Bunny Films; Federal Films
- Distributed by: Vertical Entertainment
- Release date: February 9, 2024
- Running time: 83 minutes
- Country: United States
- Language: English
- Box office: $648

Lola is a 2024 American drama film written and directed by Nicola Peltz Beckham, who stars alongside Raven Goodwin, Richie Merritt, Luke David Blumm, Trevor Long, and Virginia Madsen. The film, released in the United States on February 9, 2024, to a limited theatrical release.

== Plot ==
Lola James is an exotic dancer with a cocaine addiction by night and a drugstore clerk by day. She works the two jobs constantly in hopes of moving to Texas so her genderfluid nine-year-old brother Arlo can go to art school. Their mother Mona, a fanatically religious narcissist, heaps homophobic verbal abuse on Arlo when he shows interest in makeup. Lola has a tumultuous relationship with her ex-boyfriend Malachi, who is also her drug dealer.

After witnessing her mother sexually abuse Arlo, Lola packs their bags and moves them in with her coworker and best friend, Babina, and Babina's mother, Pearl. Just as Lola is about to save up the money to move with her brother, she is fired from her drugstore job after her coworker catches her shoplifting.

Lola goes back to Mona's house to get their dog, Mikey, and is raped by Trick, Mona’s boyfriend. Mona figures out where Arlo is and comes back for him against Lola's wishes. That night, Mona cuts off Arlo's long hair in fear of him being transgender, telling him that God will hate him. An upset Arlo runs away and is hit by a car and killed. Lola is devastated; Mona, meanwhile, blames Lola for his death.

Lola numbs her grief with cocaine, and as her addiction worsens she begs Malachi for a fix, breaking down after he refuses. Lola gets sick and takes a pregnancy test that reveals that she is now pregnant with Trick's child. She decides to keep the baby and promises Babina that she will stay clean. The next day, Malachi drives her to an addiction support group meeting.

Lola's pregnancy becomes visible and a coworker at the strip club shows admiration for her keeping the baby. Babina supports her by reading about having a child and getting her job back. Lola runs into her mother at the pharmacy she works at and tells her who her child's father is, to Mona's dismay. The girls from Lola's strip club give her some money. She shares her story at her last meeting with the support group. Babina drives Lola to the bus station to start her new life and they have a tearful goodbye. Years later, Lola is shown to be having fun with her daughter and Malachi at a carnival.

== Cast ==
- Nicola Peltz Beckham as Lola James
- Raven Goodwin as Babina, Lola's best friend
- Richie Merritt as Malachi, Lola's boyfriend
- Luke David Blumm as Arlo James, Lola's nine-year-old brother
- Trevor Long as Trick, Mona's boyfriend
- Virginia Madsen as Mona James, Lola and Arlo's mother
- Will Peltz as Frankie

== Production ==
In March 2021, it was announced that Nicola Peltz Beckham would make her directorial debut co-directing a film with Bria Vinaite that she wrote titled Lola James. The film would star Peltz and Virginia Madsen. Richie Merritt, Trevor Long, Raven Goodwin, and Luke David Blumm also joined the cast.

Principal photography began on March 1, 2021 and concluded on April 15 in Los Angeles, California.

== Release ==
Lola was released in the United States on February 9, 2024.

== Reception ==
Lola received overwhelmingly negative reviews.

Kady Ruth Ashcraft of The Guardian described Lola as "poverty porn – the exploitation of the conditions of poverty for entertainment and artistic recognition" adding that "Lola, whose protagonist careens from one traumatic experience to the next, doesn’t explore hardship – it exploits it."

Medium said, "The movie attempts to give you a wholesome ride to gritty realism but falls flat, instead looking like an [sic] Euphoria and 13 Reasons Why knockoff gone wrong."
