= Hover (film) =

- Directed by: Matt Osterman
- Written by: Cleopatra Coleman
- Produced by: Travis Stevens; Claire Haley
- Starring: Cleopatra Coleman
- Cinematography: Stuart Brereton; Needham B. Smith
- Edited by: Frank Foster-Bolton; Matt Osterman; Zechariah Thormsodsgaard
- Music by: Wojciech Golczewski
- Production company: Snowfort Pictures
- Distributed by: SyFy Films
- Release date: June 29, 2018
- Running time: 86 minutes 88 minutes
- Country: United States
- Language: English

Hover is a 2018 American science fiction film written by Cleopatra Coleman, directed by Matt Osterman and starring Coleman.

== Cast ==
- Cleopatra Coleman as Claudia
- Shane Coffey as Isaiah
- Craig Grant as John
- Fabianne Therese as Tania
- Beth Grant as Joanna
- Rhoda Griffis as Anna Cook
- Cailey Fleming as Greta Dunn

== Release ==
The film was released on June 29, 2018.

== Reception ==
The film has a 20% rating on Rotten Tomatoes based on five reviews. Glenn Kenny of RogerEbert.com awarded the film two stars.

Justin Lowe of The Hollywood Reporter gave the film a negative review and wrote, "...Coleman’s rush to condemn corporations’ profit motive seems too simplistic and skimps on the details of social disintegration that the global agricultural crisis must necessarily provoke."

Ben Kenigsberg of The New York Times also gave the film a negative review and wrote, "The last act, though, is a total whiff — too rushed, too riddled with plot holes and too incongruously hopeful to take seriously."

Rich Cross of Starburst also gave the film a negative review and wrote, "But little effort is made to evoke the seriousness of humanity’s predicament, the farm skills of the drones are left sketchy, and in the end, the menace posed by the story’s villains does not make much logical sense."
