= Children of the Corn (2020 film) =

American film by Kurt Wimmer

- Theatrical release poster
- Directed by: Kurt Wimmer
- Screenplay by: Kurt Wimmer
- Based on: "Children of the Corn" by Stephen King
- Produced by: Lucas Foster; Doug Barry; John Baldecchi
- Starring: Elena Kampouris; Kate Moyer; Callan Mulvey; Bruce Spence
- Cinematography: Andrew Rowlands
- Edited by: Merlin Eden; Tom Harrison-Read; Banner Gwin
- Music by: Jacob Shea; Tim Count
- Production companies: Tiger13; Anvil Entertainment; Digital Riot
- Distributed by: RLJE Films
- Release dates: October 23, 2020 (Sarasota); March 3, 2023
- Running time: 93 minutes
- Country: United States
- Language: English
- Budget: $10 million
- Box office: $575,179

Children of the Corn is a 2020 American supernatural slasher film written and directed by Kurt Wimmer. It stars Elena Kampouris, Kate Moyer, Callan Mulvey and Bruce Spence. The film is the third adaptation of Stephen King's short story "Children of the Corn" (1977), also serving as a reboot and the eleventh installment in the Children of the Corn film series. It is the first film based on King's story to be theatrically released since Children of the Corn II: The Final Sacrifice (1993).

Children of the Corn had premiered in Sarasota, Florida on October 23, 2020, and was released in an 18-day theatrical window starting on March 3, 2023, by RLJE Films and by Shudder on March 21, 2023. Like its predecessors, the film received negative reviews from critics and was a box office flop, grossing only $575,179 against its budget of $10 million.

== Plot ==
A young girl named Eden is playing outside when an older boy named Boyd emerges from the cornfield and retrieves a knife. He hears whispering from the cornfield and promises Eden that he does not want her to cry anymore and that "nothing really dies in the corn." After this Boyd enters the Rylstone children's home and slaughters several people inside. Boyd keeps the remaining adults hostage inside the children's home and the Rylstone sheriff and other local farmers attempt to use Halothane, an animal seditive gas, to knock Boyd unconscious. However, the gas kills all those inside, including 15 children.

The film is set in Rylstone, a small farming community whose principal crop, corn, is failing despite attempts to fix things with GMOs and herbicides. Frustrated by the lack of progress, the adults of Rylstone form a town hall meeting and the majority vote to destroy their crops so they can receive a crop subsidy from the government, infuriating Eden, an orphan being raised by the town preacher, and the other children, all of whom objected to the decision. One of the local teenagers, Boleyn, schemes with her friends to hold a mock trial that night where they will hold the adults accountable. They enlist Eden's assistance, but are horrified when this results in Eden imprisoning and slaughtering several adults and holding Boleyn hostage. The remaining adults, including Boleyn's mother, are jailed and later knocked unconscious with Halothane by Eden and forced into a pit in the cornfield, where they are used as human sacrifices for a monstrous green entity called "He Who Walks." Eden reveals that they will eradicate all adults from the world and she will take care of “He Who Walks” after he took care of her while she wandered the cornfields.

Boleyn is knocked unconscious and when she awakens she discovers that they intend to sacrifice her as well. She is able to escape, but is soon recaptured by Eden, who intends to kill her using a cattle gun. Boleyn is granted a cigarette as a final wish; however, the teen instead uses the lighter to set fire to the highly flammable corn. This successfully kills "He Who Walks"; however, Eden also perishes while trying to save the monster. The following day Boleyn returns to the fields to survey the damage, where she is devoured by Eden, who has been transformed into a monster akin to "He Who Walks", as she screams.

== Cast ==
- Elena Kampouris as Boleyn Williams
- Kate Moyer as Eden Edwards
- Callan Mulvey as Robert Williams
- Bruce Spence as Pastor Penny
- Stephen Hunter as Calvin Colvington
- Erika Heynatz as June Willis
- Anna Samson as Sheila Boyce
- Sisi Stringer as Tanika
- Andrew S. Gilbert as Sheriff Gebler
- Joe Klocek as Calder Colvington
- Orlando Schwerdt as Cal Colvington
- Brian Meegan as Wilfred Pitt

== Production ==
In 2020, the project was announced to be a remake of Children of the Corn. Producer Lucas Foster later elaborated that it was going to be a new adaptation to King's story with "almost nothing to do with" the 1984 film.

Principal photography began in New South Wales in April 2020, at the beginning of the COVID-19 pandemic, and wrapped that June. The visual effects were produced by Digital Domain, who also executive produced.

== Release ==
Children of the Corn premiered in Sarasota, Florida on October 23, 2020. The film was originally scheduled to be released theatrically in fall 2022, but was pushed back. In January 2023, RLJE Films and streaming service Shudder acquired distribution rights. The film was released in an 18-day theatrical window starting on March 3, 2023, and was released on demand on March 21, 2023. It was also released on Blu-ray and DVD on May 9, 2023. The film was released on Shudder on June 30.

== Reception ==
The film was panned by critics. On the review aggregator website Rotten Tomatoes, 11% of 57 critics' reviews are positive, with an average rating of 3.2/10. The website's consensus reads: "Bereft of a single kernel of fear or excitement, this Children of the Corn suggests the franchise is irrevocably lost in a maize of sub-mediocrity." Metacritic, which uses a weighted average, assigned the film a score of 22 out of 100, based on 11 critics, indicating "generally unfavorable" reviews.

Owen Gleiberman of Variety wrote, "Like a virus that keeps coming back but growing weaker each time, Children of the Corn is now a horror movie that lacks the strength to infect you with even a speck of fear." Meagan Navarro of Bloody Disgusting gave the film a score of 1/5, writing, "Expectations might be low at this stage of the franchise, but nothing about Children of the Corn works. Motivations are confusing at best, and Wimmer never manages to set-up who these characters are, let alone establish any rules or worldbuilding that would explain why they behave so erratically... It does get one thing right, though; maybe it's time to just let it all die." Polygon's Katie Rife wrote, "If Children of the Corn were just an empty-headed hybrid of a creature feature and a killer-kids movie, it might have been kind of fun. What really brings this remake down is the fact that it sets up so many sociopolitical themes that Wimmer never follows up on, raising the question of whether he stumbled onto them by accident."

Jeff Ewing of Inverse called the film "a mixed bag", praising the leads' performances, but noted, "The script's logic could use some retooling, the supporting performances are inconsistent, and more attention could be paid to making it feel like a town instead of a limited collection of shooting locations."

== See also ==
- List of adaptations of works by Stephen King
