= White Boy (film) =

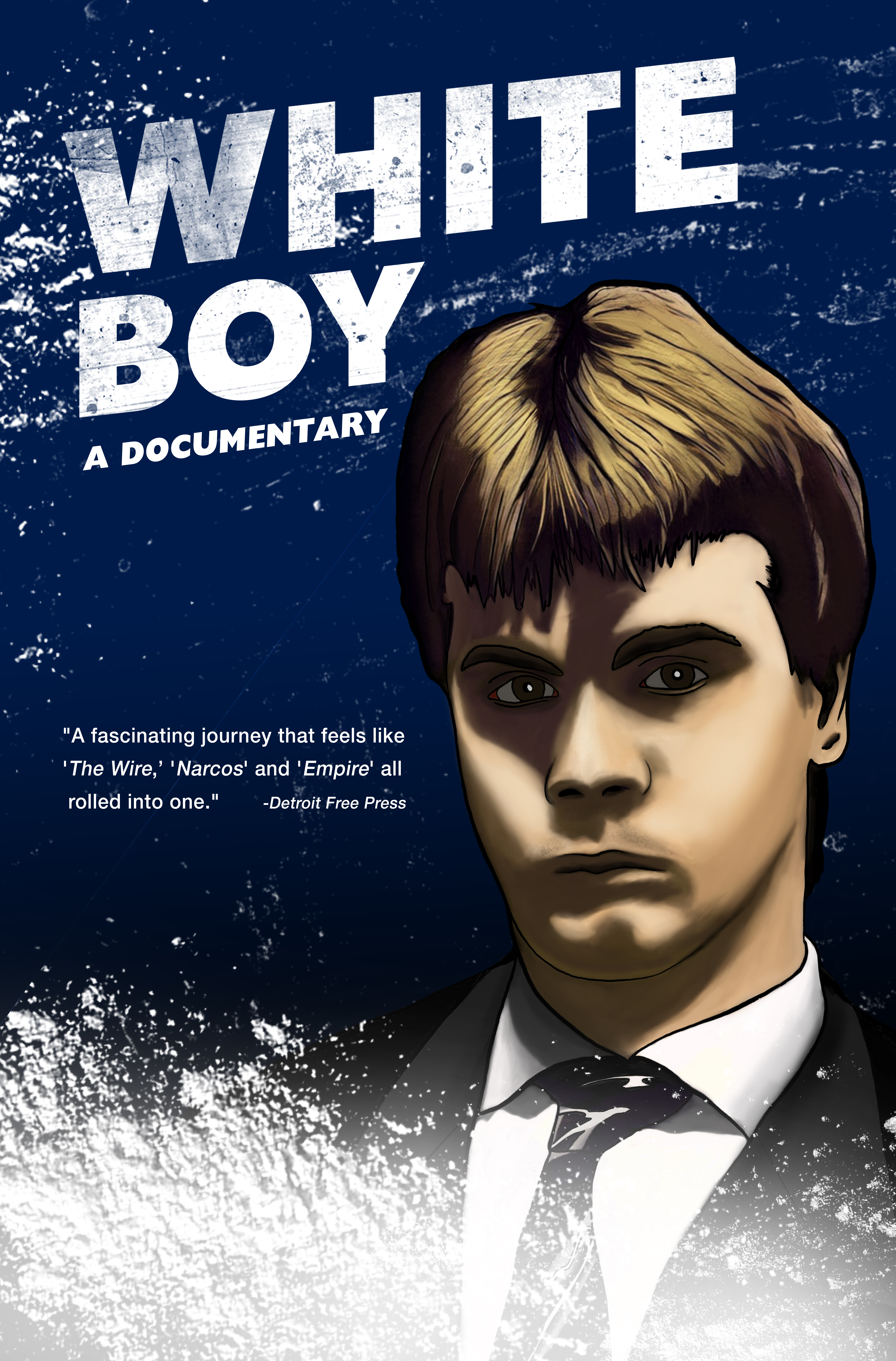
- Directed by: Shawn Rech
- Written by: Brandon Kimber; Seth Ferranti; Scott Burnstein
- Edited by: Brandon Kimber
- Production company: Transition Studios
- Release date: March 31, 2017 (Freep Film Festival)
- Running time: 82 minutes
- Country: United States
- Language: English

White Boy is a 2017 true crime documentary directed by Shawn Rech, written by Brandon Kimber, Seth Ferranti and Scott Burnstein, and produced by Transition Studios. The documentary follows the story of Richard Wershe Jr., aka "White Boy Rick", an FBI informant and alleged cocaine kingpin in Detroit in the 1980s, who was sentenced to life in prison.

== Synopsis ==
Richard Wershe Jr. was 14 years old when he started being groomed as an FBI informant and established as a drug dealer during the crack epidemic in Detroit. His intel led to the arrests of the brother of Detroit's mayor and several police officers. When it was discovered he was underage and agents were filing reports under his father's informant number, the FBI cut ties with him, but he continued to sell cocaine until his arrest a year later at age 17. Wershe Jr. was imprisoned for more than 30 years after being caught with eight kilos of cocaine in 1988. His sentence was in part a result of the 1978 "650 Lifer Law", under which anyone found with over 650 grams of heroin or cocaine could be sentenced to life without parole. Wershe Jr. became one of the nation's longest-serving non-violent juvenile drug offenders. His case spawned the Detroit urban legend known as “White Boy Rick.”

The documentary White Boy explores the relationships among Wershe Jr., Detroit Mayor Coleman Young, and Detroit City Council member Gil Hill through revealing interviews with journalists, police, federal agents, and hit men, in an attempt to discover why Wershe Jr. was denied a parole hearing after the 650 Lifer Law was modified in 1998 to eliminate the life sentence without parole.

== Reception ==
White Boy earned the Audience Choice Award at the 2017 FREEP Film Festival. The film screened at the 2017 Doc NYC film festival, and the Starz cable network licensed the documentary in 2019. A narrative film based on aspects of Richard Wershe Jr.'s life, White Boy Rick, was released in 2018.
