= White Boy Rick =

2018 film by Yann Demange

- Theatrical release poster
- Directed by: Yann Demange
- Screenplay by: Andy Weiss; Logan Miller; Noah Miller
- Based on: Richard Wershe Jr.
- Produced by: John Lesher; Julie Yorn; Darren Aronofsky; Scott Franklin
- Starring: Matthew McConaughey; Richie Merritt; Bel Powley; Jennifer Jason Leigh; Brian Tyree Henry; Rory Cochrane; RJ Cyler; Jonathan Majors; Eddie Marsan; Bruce Dern; Piper Laurie
- Cinematography: Tat Radcliffe
- Edited by: Chris Wyatt
- Music by: Max Richter
- Production companies: Columbia Pictures; Studio 8; Protozoa Pictures; LBI Entertainment; Le Grisbi Productions
- Distributed by: Sony Pictures Releasing
- Release dates: August 31, 2018 (Telluride); September 14, 2018 (United States)
- Running time: 111 minutes
- Country: United States
- Language: English
- Budget: $29 million
- Box office: $26 million

White Boy Rick is a 2018 American crime drama film directed by Yann Demange and written by Andy Weiss, Logan Miller, and Noah Miller. The film stars Matthew McConaughey, Richie Merritt in his film debut, Bel Powley, Jennifer Jason Leigh, Brian Tyree Henry, Rory Cochrane, RJ Cyler, Jonathan Majors, Eddie Marsan, Bruce Dern, and Piper Laurie in her final film role. The film is loosely based on the story of Richard Wershe Jr., who in the 1980s became the youngest FBI informant ever at the age of 14.

White Boy Rick premiered at the Telluride Film Festival on August 31, 2018, and was released in the United States on September 14, 2018, by Sony Pictures Releasing. It received mixed reviews from critics and grossed over $25 million, $4 million short of its $29 million budget.

== Plot ==
In 1984, Rick Wershe (Note: Throughout the film, both father and son are referred to as "Rick" or "Richard", with the main subject occasionally being referred to as "Ricky" by his father; for continuity, this article will refer to the father as "Rick" and the son/main character as "Ricky".) is a struggling single father living in Detroit during the height of the crack epidemic and the war on drugs. His dissatisfied daughter, Dawn, leaves their home, leaving Rick alone with his son, Ricky.^{[a]}

Rick manufactures gun parts and sells guns illegally to make ends meet, involving his son in the sale of a pair of silenced Egyptian Kalashnikov rifles to local gangster Johnny Curry. Ricky becomes good friends with Johnny's brother, Boo, which earns him the favor of Johnny and his crew.

Rick's activity attracts the attention of the FBI, and he is questioned by two agents, Alex Snyder and Frank Byrd, who see Ricky as a potential asset due to his connections with the criminal underworld. They convince Ricky to become an undercover informant behind Rick's back in exchange for money and immunity for his father.

Ricky is asked to sell drugs to keep up appearances. He becomes captivated by his extravagant new lifestyle and gains credibility as a drug supplier. Rick is suspicious of his son and confronts Ricky when he finds thousands of dollars in illicit cash underneath his bed, causing a rift between them. While Ricky is meeting with Dawn at a diner one evening, his grandfather's car is stolen, and the two shoot at the fleeing car. They are arrested but bailed out by Ricky's handlers, which arouses suspicion from Johnny.

At a party following a boxing match in Las Vegas, Johnny beats his rival's friend, Black Ed, within an inch of his life with a bottle of champagne. Afterwards, he orders a drive-by on the home of his rival, Leon Lucas, killing one of his young nephews. Ricky learns that the weapons used were the same AKs he had sold to Johnny. Devastated by his involvement in the murder of a child, he keeps a low profile and mends his relationship with his father. Johnny suspects Ricky is an informant and sends a crew member to his house, who shoots him in the stomach. While at the hospital, Snyder informs Ricky that they have enough evidence to raid all of Johnny's safe houses, and asks him to forget about the shooting in exchange for dropping all charges on his father.

In 1986, a little boy tells Ricky that his former girlfriend had a daughter named Keisha and that Ricky is the father. Rick and Ricky come over to see the child, who wins over the affection of both of them. Later on, they find Dawn at a drug den and forcibly take her home to detox. One year later, Ricky goes back to selling crack and assumes the role that Johnny left behind, even going so far as having sex with his wife, Cathy.

Ricky discovers he has earned more than enough money to make his father's dream of opening up a video store come true. However, FBI agents arrest Ricky and he is held on drug possession with intent to distribute, which could land him a potential life sentence. Ricky's former handlers deny their relationship with him but promise they will try to get his sentence reduced if he cooperates on one last bust. Ricky has Cathy help him out with a large shipment of drugs, and the FBI raids the deal, arresting everyone involved. Ricky is found guilty and is sentenced to life in prison. Rick confronts the two agents about their deal, but they feign ignorance.

After another year, Dawn, Rick, and Keisha visit Ricky in prison. Rick tries to give his son hope, but Ricky laments that his life is over. Rick tears up and apologizes for not being able to give him an easy life like he wanted. An epilogue reveals that Ricky was imprisoned for over 30 years, holding the record for the longest prison term for a non-violent offender in the state of Michigan. He was finally released on parole in 2017. His father died in 2014. His daughter, Keisha, is now happily married with two sons. A voice recording of the real Ricky Wershe Jr. plays in the background, saying that nobody thought he should really be in prison, but that he was feeling happy and hopeful.

== Cast ==
- Matthew McConaughey as Richard Wershe Sr.
- Richie Merritt as Richard Wershe Jr.
- Bel Powley as Dawn Wershe
- Jennifer Jason Leigh as FBI Agent Alex Snyder
- Brian Tyree Henry as Detroit PD Vice Detective Mel "Roach" Jackson
- Rory Cochrane as FBI Agent Frank Byrd
- RJ Cyler as Rudell "Boo" Curry
- Jonathan Majors as Johnny "Lil Man" Curry
- Eddie Marsan as Art Derrick
- Taylour Paige as Cathy Volsan-Curry
- Bruce Dern as Grandpa Roman "Ray" Wershe
- Piper Laurie as Grandma Verna Wershe
- Kwon Haynes as Edwin "Nug" Crutcher
- IshDARR as Steven "Freaky Steve” Roussell
- James Howard as Chief Homicide Inspector Hill
- YG as Leo "Big Man" Curry
- Danny Brown as Edward "Black Ed" Hanserd
- Nicholas Link as "Lil Tik" Curry Gang
- Kyanna Simone Simpson as Brenda Moore

== Production ==
In February 2015, Studio 8 acquired a spec script by Logan Miller and Noah Miller, titled White Boy Rick.

In November 2016, Matthew McConaughey joined the cast of the film, with Yann Demange directing the film, Darren Aronofsky, Scott Franklin and John Lesher produced the film under their Protozoa Pictures and LBI Entertainment banners, respectively. In January 2017, Bruce Dern and Jennifer Jason Leigh joined the cast of the film. In February 2017, Bel Powley and Brian Tyree Henry joined the cast of the film. In March 2017, Richie Merritt, Jonathan Majors, YG, Taylour Paige, Piper Laurie and RJ Cyler joined the cast of the film.

Following audience testing, in which the film scored quite high—in the 90s—director Yann Demange was given the go-ahead to shoot extra scenes.

== Release ==
The film was originally scheduled to be released on January 12, 2018, but was pushed back two weeks from its original release date of January 12, 2018, to January 26, 2018, and was pushed back again from January 26, 2018, to August 17, 2018, after successful test screenings. In April 2018 it was pushed back again from August 17, 2018, to September 14, 2018. It had its world premiere at the Telluride Film Festival on August 31, 2018. It was also screened at the 2018 Toronto International Film Festival on September 7, 2018.

== Reception ==
=== Box office ===
In the United States and Canada, White Boy Rick was released alongside The Predator, A Simple Favor and Unbroken: Path to Redemption, and was projected to gross $5–9 million from 2,504 theaters in its opening weekend. It ended up debuting to $8.8 million, finishing fourth behind The Predator, The Nun and A Simple Favor. It dropped 43% in its second weekend to $5 million, finishing sixth.

=== Critical response ===
On review aggregator Rotten Tomatoes, the film holds an approval rating of 56% based on 156 reviews, with an average rating of 6.1/10. The site's critical consensus reads, "Solid work from the cast - particularly a scene-stealing Matthew McConaughey - helps White Boy Rick make up for a number of missed opportunities in the script." On Metacritic, the film has a weighted average score of 59 out of 100, based on 35 critics, indicating "mixed or average reviews". Audiences polled by CinemaScore gave the film an average grade of "B" on an A+ to F scale, while PostTrak reported filmgoers gave it a 64% positive score and a 44% "definite recommend".

== See also ==
- White Boy (film)
- List of hood films
