= Bundestag station =

Station of the Berlin U-Bahn

Bundestag
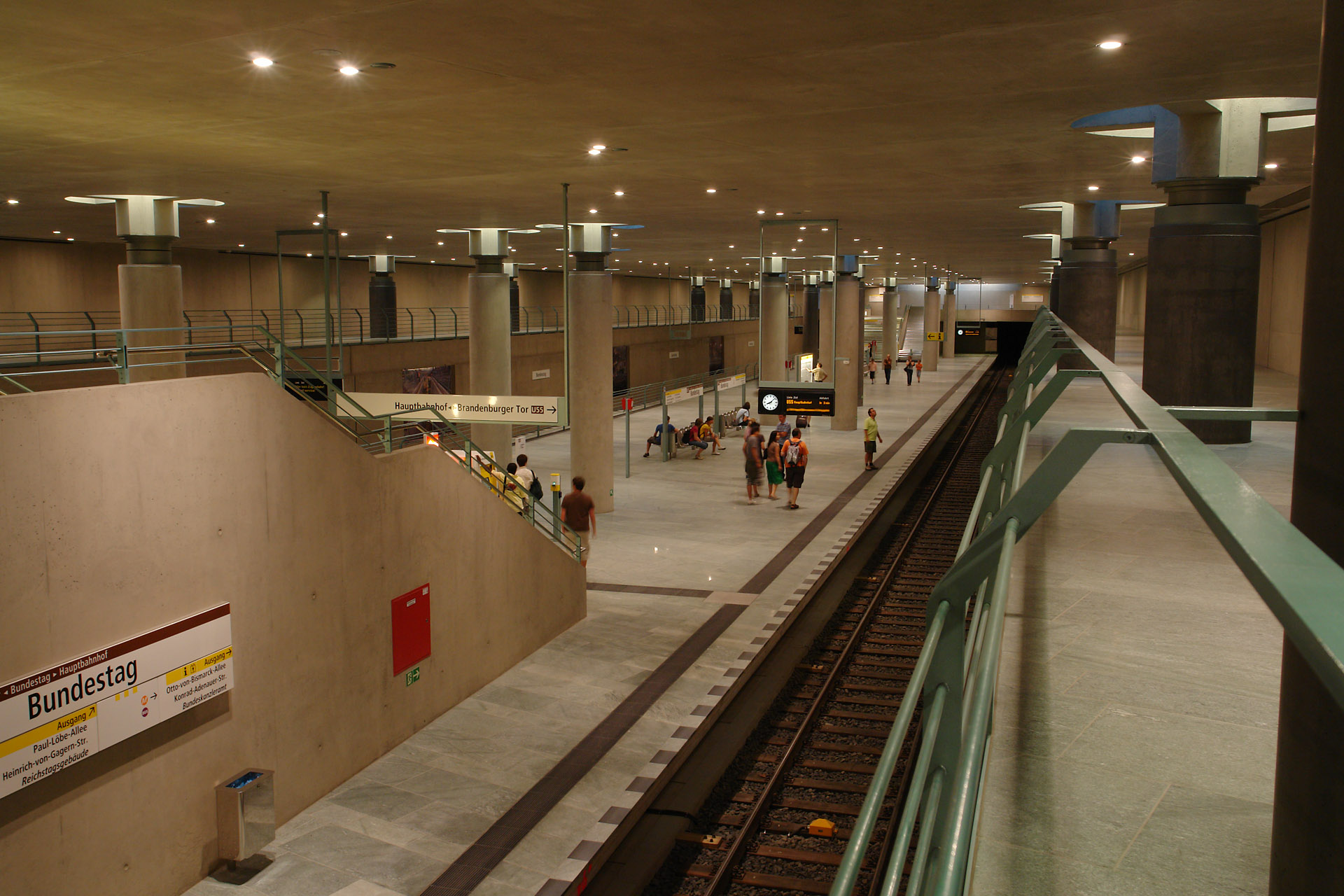

General information
- Location: Mitte; Berlin; Germany
- Coordinates: 52°31′12.05″N 13°22′22.82″E
- System: Ubf
- Operator: Berliner Verkehrsbetriebe
- Line: U5
- Platforms: 1 island platform
- Tracks: 2

Construction
- Structure type: Underground

Other information
- Fare zone: VBB: Berlin A/5555

History
- Opened: 8 August 2009

Services
Preceding station	Berlin U-Bahn	Following station
Berlin Hbf Terminus	U5	Brandenburger Tor towards Hönow
Location
- Location within Berlin

Bundestag is a Berlin U-Bahn station located on the U5 line. The name of this station was changed in April 2006 from Reichstag to Bundestag to better reflect the physical location of the station and the function of nearby buildings.

== History ==
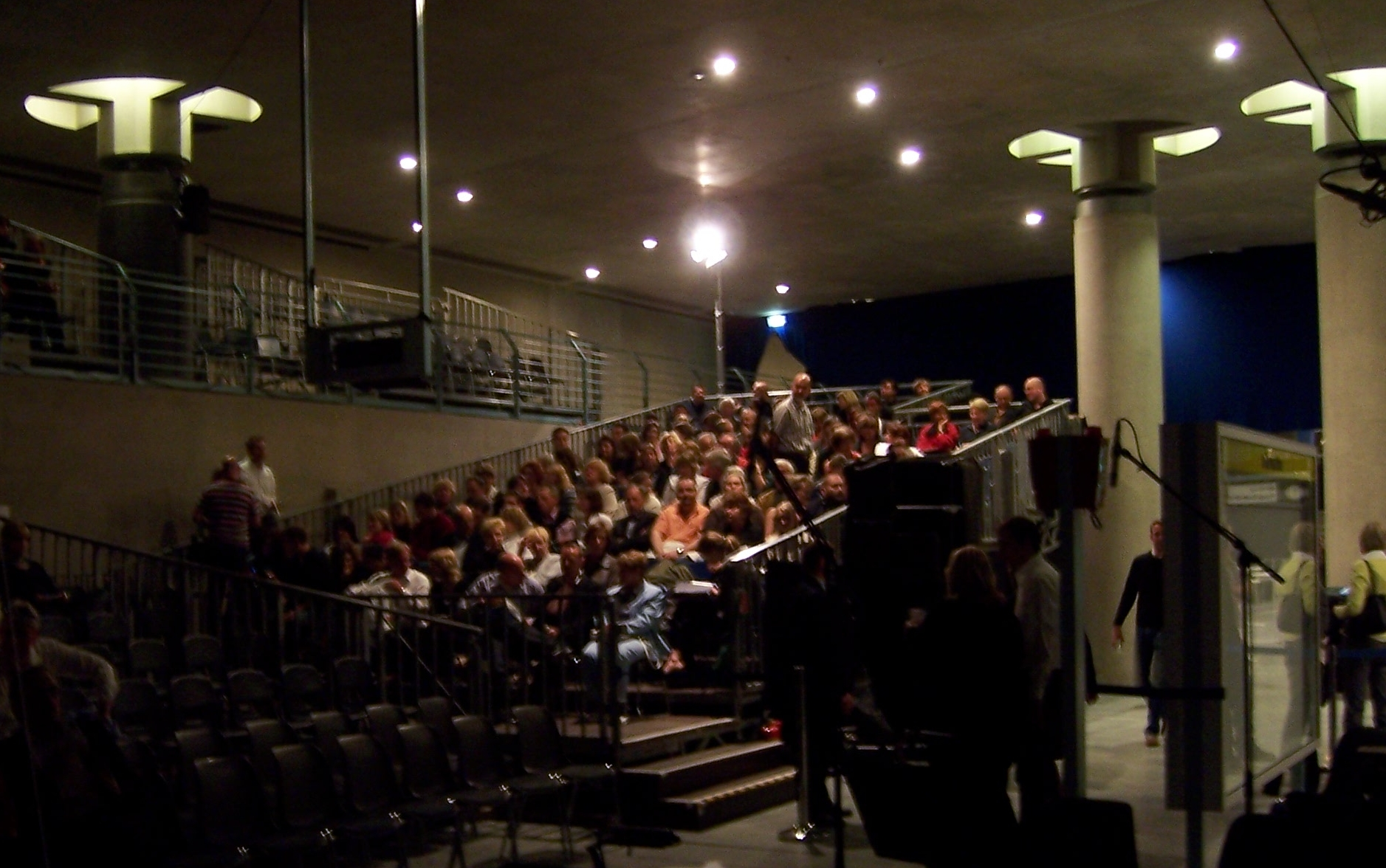
Spectators seated for an opera performance on 16 November 2008. At that time the station was not served by any line.

Even though construction was completed in 1994, it took over a decade until the subway line U55 went into service in August 2009. In the intervening period, the partially completed station with its high ceiling and unusual architecture served as a location for cultural events like performances of the opera The Magic Flute and saw use as a film set for the Resident Evil film series, for Æon Flux and for Equilibrium.

From 2009 to early 2020, only the eastern side of the island platform was used, and only as a shuttle service between Hauptbahnhof and Brandenburger Tor. On 4 December 2020 the U5 extension opened, and from this date both sides were serviced by trains.
