= In the Shadow of the Moon (2019 film) =

2019 American science fiction thriller film

- Official poster
- Directed by: Jim Mickle
- Written by: Gregory Weidman; Geoff Tock
- Produced by: Brian Kavanaugh-Jones; Ben Pugh; Rian Cahill; Linda Moran; Jim Mickle
- Starring: Boyd Holbrook; Cleopatra Coleman; Michael C. Hall
- Cinematography: David Lanzenberg
- Edited by: Michael Berenbaum
- Music by: Jeff Grace
- Production companies: 42; Automatik; Nightshade
- Distributed by: Netflix
- Release dates: September 21, 2019 (Fantastic Fest); September 27, 2019 (United States)
- Running time: 115 minutes
- Country: United States
- Language: English

In the Shadow of the Moon is a 2019 American science fiction-thriller film directed by Jim Mickle and written by Gregory Weidman and Geoff Tock.

The neo-noir film stars Boyd Holbrook, Cleopatra Coleman, Michael C. Hall, and Bokeem Woodbine. It had its world premiere at Fantastic Fest on September 21, 2019, before it was released on Netflix on September 27, 2019.

== Plot ==
In 1988 Philadelphia, several people are found dead whose brains hemorrhage out of their facial orifices. Police officer Thomas Lockhart and his partner, Maddox, investigate with Lockhart's brother-in-law, Detective Holt. They are connected, as similar puncture wounds are found on each victim. Finding a dying woman with the same wounds, she describes her assailant as a black woman with a wounded hand.

Lockhart and Maddox find the suspect, chasing her into the subway, where she subdues Maddox. When Lockhart confronts her, she reveals details about his life, such as his wife giving birth that day to a girl. She predicts her own death just prior to a struggle, which ends with a train striking and crushing her. Although confused about the many unexplained details, the police close the case. Meanwhile, Lockhart's wife dies in childbirth.

Nine years later, in 1997, there is another apparent copycat killing spree. The now detective Lockhart, caring for his young daughter Amy, and the now lieutenant Holt, cannot find any connection between the victims. Lockhart retrieves keys found on the subway suspect in 1988 to an aircraft manufactured in 1996.

Physicist Naveen Rao insists this is proof of time travel enabled by a lunar epiphany every nine years, but Maddox and Lockhart ignore him. Tracking the killer to an airfield, Lockhart is shocked to find the same person from 1988, alive and not aged. She unintentionally kills Maddox and takes Lockhart hostage, again inexplicably revealing knowledge about his life. She takes him on board a small aircraft, warns him to never look for her again, and pushes him out of the plane into the sea before crashing nearby.

In 2006, the now alcoholic Lockhart is a P.I. obsessed with solving the case, which he now believes involves time travel and the elusive Dr. Rao. The teenage Amy lives with Holt, who only occasionally has contact with her dad. Lockhart discovers a previously unrecorded victim from the 1988 murders, visiting his wife, who reveals he had run a white nationalist militia group.

Lockhart presents Holt with his theory that the suspect is moving back in time as they are moving forward, killing each member of the terrorist group. Holt dismisses this, insisting he get psychiatric help. Lockhart steals Holt's badge to track down the white nationalist leader's former girlfriend, who was even more extremist.

Arriving at her home, Lockhart finds she has just been murdered by the suspect, who is still present. He chases her, shoots her hand, following her to the beach of the plane's crash site and into a sewage hole. There, he sees her disappear into a time machine. As he exits the tunnel, Lockhart is arrested by Holt as an unseen Rao watches.

In 2015, while waiting for the woman on the beach, Lockhart listens to a message from Amy inviting him to his grandchild's birth. He is suddenly kidnapped by Rao, who admits to developing the technology the woman uses to kill her victims, an injection whose effects can be triggered remotely through time. He explains her cause is justified, as she is killing only those innocents in the past who inspired the future perpetrators of a terrible tragedy.

Lockhart escapes from Rao and confronts the woman, who introduces herself as Rya, Amy's daughter and his granddaughter, born that very day. She explains that many years later, Lockhart convinces an adult Rya to take the mission after the militia group's terrorism triggered a new civil war in 2024, when she was only nine.

Rya travels backwards in time, every nine years in reverse chronological order in phase with lunar epiphanies, injecting her targets in the neck with a remotely triggered isotope. For her, the 2006 events have not yet happened, so her hand is not yet wounded. Overcome with guilt over causing his own granddaughter's death, Lockhart acknowledges that he killed her in 1988. Convinced her cause is just, he lets her complete her mission, the only way for her to eventually survive.

After Rya's departure into the past, an elderly Rao triggers the injections, killing Rya's targets and erasing the terrorist attack and subsequent civil war from the timeline. In 2015, Lockhart reunites with his family and embraces the chance at a new future with his newborn granddaughter.

== Cast ==
- Boyd Holbrook as Thomas Lockhart
- Cleopatra Coleman as Rya
- Bokeem Woodbine as Maddox
- Rudi Dharmalingam as Naveen Rao
- Rachel Keller as Jean
- Michael C. Hall as Holt
- Sarah Dugdale as Amy (ages 18 + 27)
- Quincy Kirkwood as Amy (age 9)
- Philippa Domville as Arlene
- Tony Nappo as Clark

== Production ==
The project was announced in February 2018, with Jim Mickle directing and Boyd Holbrook set to star in the lead role. The film would be produced and distributed by Netflix. In June 2018, Michael C. Hall joined the cast of the film. In July 2018, Cleopatra Coleman and Bokeem Woodbine joined the cast.

Speaking about the project, director Mickle declared:

“Gregory [Weidman] and Geoff’s [Tock] script is such a great mind bender and beautifully weaves together all my favorite genres, Boyd [Holbrook] is going to eat this role alive and show why he’s one of the best young actors working today. We’re lucky to have an incredibly talented producing team and a home like Netflix that’s excited to take chances. Any studio that makes Okja has a permanent place in my heart.”

Principal production commenced on July 2, 2018 and ended on August 27, 2018 in Toronto, Ontario, Canada.

== Release ==
The film had its world premiere at Fantastic Fest on September 21, 2019. On September 27, 2019, the film was available to stream on Netflix.

== Reception ==
On the review aggregator website Rotten Tomatoes, 59% of 51 critics' reviews are positive, with an average rating of 5.7/10. The website's consensus reads: "In the Shadow of the Moon isn't always successful at balancing its assorted elements, but its struggles may be diverting enough to warrant a stream." Metacritic, which uses a weighted average, assigned the film a score of 48 out of 100, based on 9 critics, indicating "mixed or average" reviews.

In a 3 out of 5 stars review, The Guardian called the film "odd and unwieldy," but the reviewer added, "I also found myself oddly charmed by its brazen nuttiness, a film aiming for the stars." The Crooked Marquee website opines that director Mickle "does what he can with the screenplay by first-timers Gregory Weidman and Geoffrey Tock, but he's hamstrung by its focus on the cop stuff, which is formulaic, over the sci-fi stuff... The meat of the story, though, which has Locke going a little insane trying to figure out what's happening (and convince others of it), is exciting, nerdy sci-fi business, and Holbrook and Hall wear their weary cop characters well." Similarly, the /Film site reviewer calls it "a frenetic mash-up of sci-fi, mystery, horror, and action," saying that Weidman and Tock "have a wealth of inventive ideas, some of which pack a punch... But the writers never seem fully confident in the story they're telling, and as determined as the film's script is to defy expectations, one can't just help that the writers had settled in on a specific genre and stuck with it." The reviewer for IGN argues that "while the film's ambitions are lofty, it isn't quite the sum of its parts," yet "It's a breathless opener, which startles and thrills in equal measure, the script by Gregory Weidman and Geoffrey Took motoring at breakneck speed, and director Jim Mickle...injecting energy, vitality and intensity into every scene."
