= Trevor Long (actor) =

American actor

- Born: Poughkeepsie, New York
- Education: Brown University (BA); Rutgers University, New Brunswick (MFA)
- Occupation: Actor
- Years active: 1994–present

Trevor Long is an American film, television and stage actor, best known for his recurring role as Cade Langmore on the Netflix TV series Ozark, as well as his role as former detective Sean Foster on the television series Low Winter Sun.

== Early life ==
Long was born in Poughkeepsie, New York, and moved to Pittsburgh, Pennsylvania, in second grade, graduating from Sewickley Academy in 1988. Long completed his Bachelor of Arts in acting at Brown University and his Masters of Fine Arts in Meisner acting at Rutgers University. He also trained with Harold Guskin.

== Career ==
=== Film ===
Long's notable film credits include Killing Them Softly, Don Juan DeMarco, and Jack Goes Boating. In 2018, he starred in Seeds, a horror film directed by his brother, Owen.

=== Stage ===
Long has also been involved in numerous off-Broadway and other theater performances with the Huntington Theatre Company in Boston, the Manhattan Theatre Club, and the LAByrinth Theater Company in New York City, where he starred in a production of In Arabia We'd All Be Kings directed by Philip Seymour Hoffman.

== Filmography ==
| Year | Title | Role | Notes |
|---|---|---|---|
| 1994 | Don Juan DeMarco | Waiter | |
| 2001 | Pit | Dale | Short |
| 2005 | Fat Cats | Prison inmate | |
| 2007 | The Karaoke King | Tommy | |
| 2007 | Brutal Massacre: A Comedy | Ronaldo | |
| 2009 | Concerto | Phillip | Short |
| 2009 | The Roofer | Miles | Short |
| 2010 | Jack Goes Boating | Waldorf Doorman | |
| 2010 | Tymbals | ROLE | |
| 2012 | Killing Them Softly | Stevie Caprio | |
| 2012 | What Maisie Knew | Musician #1 | |
| 2013 | Armed Defense | Man | Short |
| 2013 | Low Winter Sun | Sean Foster | 7 episodes |
| 2014 | The Blacklist | Alan Ray Rifkin | Episode: "The Judge" |
| 2015 | Blindspot | Boyce | Episode: "Pilot" |
| 2016 | Unforgettable | Foster Lee Nolan | Episode: "Game On" |
| 2017–2018, 2022 | Ozark | Cade Langmore | 14 episodes |
| 2018 | Seeds | Marcus | |
| 2018 | Magnum P.I. | Manny | Episode: "Die He Said" |
| 2019 | Chicago P.D. | Logan Gaines | Episode: "Ties That Bind" |
| 2019 | Bull | Norman Schweiger | Episode: "Parental Guidance" |
| 2019 | The Resident | Rob Spiro | 2 episodes |
| 2020 | FBI: Most Wanted | Gil Rickman | Episode: "Dopesick" |
| 2021 | Dopesick | Rudy Giuliani | Episode: "Hammer the Abusers" |
| 2022 | Law & Order: Special Victims Unit | Aaron Wesley Parker | Episode: "18 Wheels a Predator" |
| 2024 | Lola | Trick | |
