= IshDARR =

American rapper

- Born: Ishmael Ali; August 28, 1996 (age 29); Milwaukee, Wisconsin
- Genres: Hip hop
- Occupations: Singer; rapper; songwriter; actor
- Years active: 2015–present
- Label: EMPIRE

Ishmael Ali (known professionally as IshDARR) is an American rapper, hip hop artist, and actor from Milwaukee, Wisconsin. He has released 2 EPs and 3 LPs. His most recent project, the mixtape Slow Down, KID, was released in November 2018 and was distributed by EMPIRE. IshDARR is also an actor who had a role in the 2018 film, White Boy Rick.

== Early life and education ==
Ishmael Ali was born in Milwaukee, Wisconsin. He and his family moved to Waukegan, Illinois for a few years before moving back to Milwaukee when Ali was 7 or 8. He began making music, freestyling, and writing lyrics in 7th grade. As a freshman at Messmer High School, Ali met his future manager (Enrique "Mag" Rodriguez) who was friends with his older brother and fellow rapper, Isaiah "BoodahDARR" Ali. The three (along with another Messmer rapper, Wave Chappelle) formed a group called the iLL Collective which released three songs before disbanding when BoodahDARR went to college. Rodriguez began working with IshDARR on music in late 2013 and early 2014 using a studio in the high school. IshDARR graduated from Messmer in 2014.

== Career ==
In early 2014 as IshDARR was preparing to release his debut solo EP, he was contacted by an A&R representative at Epic Records, Amanda Berkowitz. She would later become IshDARR's mentor and co-manager. He released his EP, The Better Life, in April 2014. The day after the collection's release, he opened for Schoolboy Q, Isaiah Rashad, Vince Staples, and Audio Push at The Rave in Milwaukee. In the summer of that year, IshDARR and his manager Enrique "Mag" Rodriguez were flown to Los Angeles to have a meeting with Mike Caren, the Vice President of A&R at Atlantic Records at the time. Although the two decided against signing a deal, IshDARR received interest from several record labels afterward, and joined The Agency Group (a talent booking firm) in December 2014. He also opened up for Ab-Soul on his "These Days" tour in the fall of 2014.

In March 2015, he released his first mixtape, Old Soul, Young Spirit, which featured the single "Too Bad". The song gained increased popularity after actress Chloë Grace Moretz tweeted it out to her followers. It also reached the top 10 on Hype Machine and garnered over 7 million streams by the following year. IshDARR performed at South by Southwest in 2015 and toured Europe later that year and in early 2016. In the summer of 2016, he performed at Summerfest in Milwaukee opening for Jason Derulo on the main stage.

In October 2016, he released his second mixtape, Broken Hearts & Bankrolls, which featured the single, "Sugar". In November of that year, IshDARR was featured on the Jacob Latimore track, "The Real", and its accompanying video. Throughout the year, he opened for a variety of acts including Anderson Paak, PartyNextDoor, and Jeremih. In April 2017, it was announced that IshDARR had been cast as Steven "Freaky Steve" Roussell in the film, White Boy Rick, starring Matthew McConaughey. The film, which also featured IshDARR's brother BoodahDARR, had its wide release in September 2018.

Later in April 2017, IshDARR released an EP, Four The Better, which featured the singles "Free" and "Mucho Mango". Later that year, he again appeared at Summerfest, this time in a headlining role. His performance was recorded for the music video for his single, "Sanity". In 2018, he began releasing several new tracks, starting with "They Lost Me 2" and "Fangs" in January. He followed that with "Critical" in May and "Slow Down" in October.

All of those tracks appeared on his mixtape, Slow Down, KID, released in November 2018 and distributed by EMPIRE. A deluxe edition of the LP was released in April 2019 and featured 4 additional tracks. In March 2019, IshDARR was featured alongside his brother on the Royal Waev track, "Checks & Balances". He was also featured on the Saint Parrish track "Drown" and the Genesis Renji song "Wannabe" later in the year.

== Discography ==
=== Mixtapes ===
List of mixtapes with selected details
Title	Details
Old Soul, Young Spirit	Released: March 4, 2015 (US); Label: Self-released; Formats: Digital download
Broken Hearts & Bankrolls	Released: October 7, 2016 (US); Label: Self-released (distributed by EMPIRE); Formats: Digital download
Slow Down, KID	Released: November 2, 2018 (US); Label: Self-released (distributed by EMPIRE); Formats: Digital download

=== EPs ===
List of EPs with selected details
Title	Details
The Better Life	Released: April 17, 2014 (US); Label: Self-released; Formats: Digital download
Four The Better	Released: April 14, 2017 (US); Label: Self-released (distributed by EMPIRE); Formats: Digital download

=== Singles ===
List of singles with selected details
Title	Year	Album
"Too Bad"	2015	Old Soul, Young Spirit
"Sugar"	2016	Broken Hearts & Bankrolls
"Free"	2017	Four The Better
"They Lost Me 2"	2018	Slow Down, KID
"Critical"	2018	Slow Down, KID
"Never Ask (Subpar Funk)" (feat. Floor Cry)	2018	Slow Down, KID
"Slow Down"	2018	Slow Down, KID

== Filmography ==
Year	Film	Role
2018	White Boy Rick	Steven "Freaky Steve" Roussell
