= Lucas Foster =

American film producer

- Born: New York City, New York, U.S.
- Occupations: Film producer, entrepreneur
- Years active: 1989-present

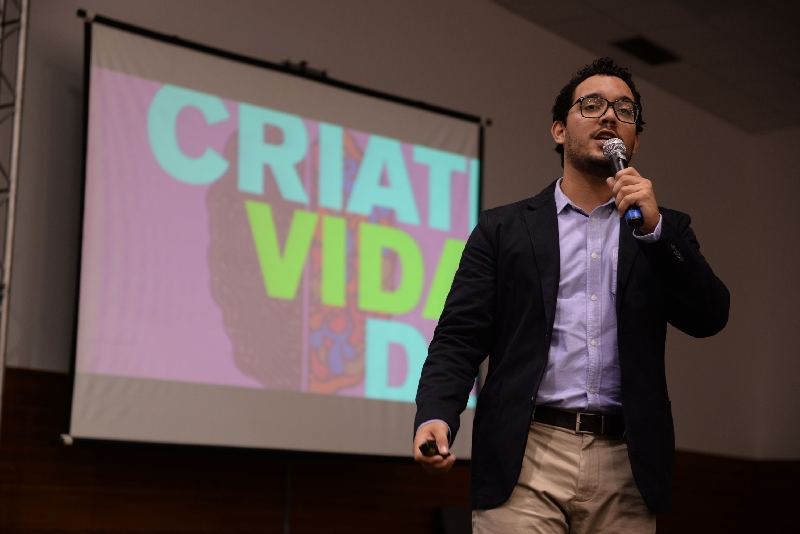
Lucas Foster, 2014

Lucas Foster is an American film producer whose films include Mr. & Mrs. Smith, Man on Fire, and Equilibrium. He is also one of the co-founders of HeadcaseVR, a virtual reality company.

== Career ==
In late 2009, it was revealed that Foster would be producing Go Like Hell for 20th Century Fox. Based on the book, Go Like Hell: Ford, Ferrari, and Their Battle for Speed and Glory at Le Mans, the film revolves around the rivalry between Enzo Ferrari and Carroll Shelby during the 1960s. By 2014, the project was said to feature Tom Cruise and Brad Pitt in the leads, with Joseph Kosinski pegged to direct the film. Due to budget issues, the project was scrapped, but interest in it revived in 2015, with Christian Bale now attached.

In 2012, industry trade papers ran stories that Foster was scheduled to produce The Job, an action thriller based on a screenplay by Brad Mirman, with a budget of $20 million. In 2014, along with four others, Foster co-founded HeadcaseVR, which is utilized in fields as diverse as college sports, where it is used to help in recruiting players, to retail sales, where companies such as Nike and Chevrolet use it new retail sources.

In 2020, during the COVID-19 pandemic, Foster decided to isolate the entire cast and crew in a small town in Australia during production of a horror film based on a short story, "Children of the Corn" by Stephen King. Included in the crew were a doctor, nurse and paramedic. Everyone was required to fill out health questionnaires at the start and end of each day. All surfaces were kept sanitized, and temperatures were taken every day. Foster said that the additional precautions to protect everyone from the virus added about 20 percent to the original $10 million budget for the film.

== Filmography ==
Producer

- Lisa (1990) (Associate producer)
- Equilibrium (2002)
- Walking Tall (2004)
- Man on Fire (2004)
- Eulogy (2004)
- Mr. & Mrs. Smith (2005)
- Jumper (2008)
- Street Kings (2008)
- Law Abiding Citizen (2009)
- Children of the Corn (2020)
- Morbius (2022)

Executive producer

- Bad Boys (1995)
- Crimson Tide (1995)
- Dangerous Minds (1995)
- Van Wilder (2002)
- Jeepers Creepers 2 (2003)
- Imagining Argentina (2003) (Co-executive producer)
- Death Defying Acts (2007)
- Ford v Ferrari (2019)

Thanks

- The Good Girl (2002)
