= The Argument (film) =

- Official poster
- Directed by: Robert Schwartzman
- Written by: Zac Stanford
- Produced by: Robert Schwartzman; Russell Wayne Groves
- Starring: Maggie Q; Danny Pudi; Cleopatra Coleman; Tyler James Williams; Dan Fogler; Emma Bell
- Cinematography: Michael Rizzi
- Edited by: Max Goldblatt
- Production companies: Utopia; Beachwood Park Films
- Distributed by: Gravitas Ventures
- Release date: September 4, 2020
- Country: United States
- Language: English

The Argument is a 2020 American comedy-drama film, directed by Robert Schwartzman, from a screenplay by Zac Stanford. It stars Maggie Q, Danny Pudi, Cleopatra Coleman, Tyler James Williams, Dan Fogler, and Emma Bell.

It was released on September 4, 2020, by Gravitas Ventures.

== Plot ==
A couple get into an argument while hosting a party. They and their guests later decide to re-create the argument in order to settle their disagreement over how the argument occurred. The four original participants become obsessed with recreating the argument accurately, first by re-enacting it themselves, but when they are unsatisfied by the results, they eventually hire actors to re-enact the incident.

== Cast ==
- Dan Fogler as Jack
- Emma Bell as Lisa
- Danny Pudi as Brett
- Cleopatra Coleman as Trina
- Tyler James Williams as Paul
- Maggie Q as Sarah
- Mark Ryder as Actor Jack
- Karan Brar as Actor Brett
- Marielle Scott as Actor Trina
- Charlotte McKinney as Actor Lisa
- Nathan Stewart-Jarrett as Actor Paul

== Production ==
In May 2019, it was announced Dan Fogler, Emma Bell, Danny Pudi, Cleopatra Coleman, Tyler James Williams, Maggie Q, Mark Ryder, Karan Brar, Marielle Scott, Charlotte McKinney and Nathan Stewart-Jarrett had joined the cast of the film, with Robert Schwartzman directing from a screenplay by Zac Stanford. Production concluded that same month.

== Release ==
In August 2020, Gravitas Ventures acquired distribution rights to the film and set it for September 4, 2020.

== Critical reception ==
The Argument holds a 74% approval rating on review aggregator website Rotten Tomatoes, based on 19 reviews, with an average of 6.8/10. On Metacritic, the film holds a rating of 48 out of 100, based on 6 critics, indicating "mixed or average" reviews.
