= Take the 10 =

- Film poster
- Directed by: Chester Tam
- Written by: Chester Tam
- Produced by: Sam Maydew
- Starring: Josh Peck; Tony Revolori; Emily Chang; Cleopatra Coleman; Kevin Corrigan; Andy Samberg
- Cinematography: Ricardo Jacques Gale; Parker Tolifson
- Edited by: Robert Schafer
- Production companies: Blue Creek Pictures; Silver Lining Entertainment
- Distributed by: Netflix
- Release date: January 20, 2017
- Running time: 80 minutes
- Country: United States
- Language: English

Take the 10 is a 2017 American black comedy film written and directed by Chester Tam and starring Josh Peck, Tony Revolori, Emily Chang, Cleopatra Coleman, Kevin Corrigan and Andy Samberg.

The plot is a non-linear recount of a day as experienced by several different characters connected to two under-achievers who work in a health food-themed supermarket in LA.

The film was released on Netflix on January 20, 2017.

== Plot ==
Chris and Chester are best friends working together in dead-end jobs in a health food-themed supermarket in LA. They both have very different outlooks on life. Chris very much lives in the moment, while Chester focuses on his long-term goal of moving to Brazil.

Chester asks Chris to cover his register while he meets up with Carlo who has expressed interest in buying his Craigslisted 90s Corolla. Arriving at their meeting point, Carlo asks him to drive, supposedly to see how it drives. However, his associate Paco climbs into the trunk with an automatic weapon. Chester discovers he's being used as a get-away driver for a drive-by. After the Guatemalans shower a rival gang with bullets, Chester takes them on a gridlocked freeway and escapes on foot.

Chris's day starts with his 35 y.o. diabetic brother Johnny videoing him pranking him, which goes viral. As he's a ticket scalper, Chris swipes two tickets. At work he covers Chester's register and tells customers they can only pay cash, so he can skim money to recover his impounded car. Discovering the tickets are fakes, he arranges to meet legit scalper Jay Morrison, swaps the tickets and steals Jay's stash of drugs.

Supermarket manager Danny, a gambler and addict, calls Jay for coke although he already owes him 3,000 dollars. Under threat of bodily harm, he cleans out a register to give him 1,000 dollars. Given an hour to come up with the rest, Danny calls Chester into his office and tells him he discovered that he and Chris had stolen food to resell to another supermarket and threatens to call the police. Chester offers to give him the money from his car sale.

Mr. Winters from divisional management comes a day early to oversee the supermarket and how it's run for the next two weeks. Brooke briefs Danny and Winters on the register tallies, revealing the 800 dollar shortfall caused by Chris while he was operating Chester's register. Danny realises that he himself must have been captured on camera emptying a register. Two undercover LAPD cops approach him, pressuring him to help them catch Jay.

When Jay arrives home and discovers that Chris switched the tickets, he gets angry and calls Sahara a thot. She slaps him and asks hims if he is gay or into other girls. Jay promptly breaks up with her. Soon after, he comes across Chris and Chester on the highway, shooting out the newly-recovered car's windows and tires.

Chris and Chester hitch to the show, and are picked up by Sahara and her friend. Despite their valid tickets, they cannot enter because the venue is already filled to capacity. They jump the fence, and once inside Chester forces Chris to come clean. Jay finds them in the toilets, but before he can exact revenge for the tickets and the moonrocks, a high Chester knocks him down.

Early the next morning, the buddies arrive back in LA with Sahara and Carmen, and Chris gives Chester 1,000 dollars from selling the moonrocks. Jay arrives to deal to Danny at the supermarket and the LAPD take him in. A short while later they return as Winters and Brooke have found footage implicating Danny in the theft of 1,800 dollars. Carlo and Paco are taken in for auto theft and Chester flies to Brazil.

== Cast ==
- Josh Peck as Chris
- Tony Revolori as Chester Tamborghini
- Emily Chang as Carmen
- Cleopatra Coleman as Sahara
- Kevin Corrigan as Danny Bryant
- Andy Samberg as Johnny
- Xavi Israel as Rico
- Emily Kuroda as Patti
- Stella Maeve as Brooke
- Paul McCrane as Carey Winters
- DaJuan Rippy as Denzel
- Jordan Rock as Greg
- Chester Tam as Jay Morrison
- Carlos Alazraqui as Carlo
- Fernando Colunga as Erick
- Exie Booker as Officer Peterson
- Mike Bradecich as Tony
- Ashanti Brown as Gale
- Fred Armisen as Driver

== Release ==
The film was released on Netflix on January 20, 2017.
