= Equilibrium (film) =

2002 film by Kurt Wimmer

- Theatrical release poster
- Directed by: Kurt Wimmer
- Written by: Kurt Wimmer
- Produced by: Jan de Bont; Lucas Foster
- Starring: Christian Bale; Emily Watson; Taye Diggs; Angus Macfadyen; Sean Bean; Matthew Harbour; William Fichtner
- Cinematography: Dion Beebe
- Edited by: Tom Rolf; William Yeh
- Music by: Klaus Badelt
- Production companies: Dimension Films; Blue Tulip Productions
- Distributed by: Miramax Films
- Release date: December 6, 2002
- Running time: 107 minutes
- Country: United States
- Language: English
- Budget: $20 million
- Box office: $5.3 million

Equilibrium is a 2002 American science fiction dystopian action film written and directed by Kurt Wimmer, and starring Christian Bale, Emily Watson, and Taye Diggs. The film follows Bale as John Preston, an enforcement officer in a future in which feelings and artistic expression are outlawed, and a society where its citizens are forced to take psychoactive drugs to suppress emotion. After accidentally missing a dose, Preston awakens and begins to uncover the suspicious inner workings of the regime governing the totalitarian state.

Miramax Films released Equilibrium theatrically on December 6, 2002. The film was a critical and commercial failure at the box office, though it was ultimately profitable due to international pre-release sales. It received unfavorable reviews and grossed only $5.3 million against a production budget of $20 million, but has garnered a cult status.

== Plot ==
In the first years of the 21st century a third World War broke out. Those of us who survived knew mankind could never survive a fourth; that our own volatile natures could simply no longer be risked. So we have created a new arm of the law – The Grammaton Cleric, whose sole task is to seek out and eradicate the true source of man's inhumanity to man: his ability to feel.

— Opening narration

Established after World War III, the totalitarian city-state of Libria blames human emotion as the root of all conflict. It bans all activities or objects that stimulate emotion, with violators labeled Sense Offenders and sentenced to death. The population takes daily injections of the drug Prozium II, which suppresses emotion. Libria is governed by the Tetragrammaton Council, led by "Father", who communicates propaganda through giant video screens. The police force is led by the Grammaton Clerics, elite fighters trained in the art of gun kata. Clerics frequently conduct raids to search for and destroy illegal materials – art, literature and music – while executing Sense Offenders. A resistance movement, known as the "Underground", seeks to topple Father and the Tetragrammaton Council.

The flag of Libria. The four Ts on the flag represent the Tetragrammaton Council.

In 2072, John Preston is a high-ranking Cleric whose wife, Viviana, was executed as a Sense Offender, leaving him as a single parent of two. Following a raid, Preston notices his partner Errol Partridge saving a book of poems by W. B. Yeats from incineration. He follows Partridge to the Nether – a region outside the city – and finds him reading the book. Partridge claims he gladly pays the price of having emotions before Preston executes him.

Preston accidentally breaks his last vial of Prozium and is unable to replace them before the next raid. Shocked by the onset of emotions and newfound awareness of his surroundings, he intentionally skips additional doses, hiding them behind his bathroom mirror. Partridge is replaced by the ambitious Andrew Brandt, who admires Preston. On another raid, Sense Offender Mary O'Brien attempts to resist arrest. Preston stops Brandt from executing her, saying she should be interrogated.

Preston feels remorse for killing Partridge, develops an emotional relationship with O'Brien, and seeks atonement. He uncovers clues that lead him to Jurgen, the Underground leader. Jurgen plans to disrupt Prozium production to spark an uprising and convinces Preston that Father must be assassinated. Vice-Counsel DuPont, suspecting there is a traitor among the Clerics, assigns Preston to unmask him.

O'Brien is sentenced to death. Recalling his lack of reaction to his wife's sentencing, Preston tries to intervene but is too late to stop O'Brien's execution. Overcome with grief in public, he is arrested by Brandt as a Sense Offender. Preston tricks DuPont into believing that Brandt is the traitor. Told that his home will be searched as a formality, Preston rushes to destroy the hidden vials, only to discover his son, who stopped taking Prozium after his mother's death, already has.

Jurgen offers to let Preston arrest the Underground leaders as a means of getting close to Father. Granted an exclusive audience, Preston is instead met by Brandt, who is part of an elaborate scheme to expose both Preston and the Underground. "Father" is revealed to have died years ago and been secretly replaced by DuPont, whose inner circle does not take Prozium and freely indulges in banned material.

Having anticipated the trap, Preston fights through an army of bodyguards to DuPont's office, killing Brandt in a katana battle. DuPont and Preston engage in a gun kata showdown, which Preston wins. DuPont pleads for his life, asking "Is it really worth the price?" Recalling Partridge's last words, Preston responds "I pay it gladly" and kills DuPont. He destroys the command center that broadcasts Father's propaganda, signaling the Underground to destroy Prozium manufacturing plants and storm Libria. Watching the revolution begin to unfold, Preston smiles.

== Cast ==
- Christian Bale as John Preston
- Emily Watson as Mary O'Brien
- Taye Diggs as Andrew Brandt
- Angus Macfadyen as Vice Counsel DuPont
- Sean Bean as Errol Partridge
- Matthew Harbour as Robbie Preston
- William Fichtner as Jurgen
- Sean Pertwee as Father
- David Hemmings as Proctor
- Emily Siewert as Lisa Preston
- Alexa Summer as Viviana Preston (Note: Alexa Summer and Maria Pia Calzone portray the same character in the film, but appear in the credits separately as "Viviana Preston" and "Preston's wife" respectively.)
- Maria Pia Calzone as Preston's Wife
- Dominic Purcell as Seamus
- Brian Conley as Reading Room Overseer
- Kurt Wimmer (cameo) as Rebel Victim

== Gun kata ==
Angus Macfadyen's character, Vice-Counsel DuPont, describes the fictional fighting style gun kata in the film:

Through analysis of thousands of recorded gunfights, the Cleric has determined that the geometric distribution of antagonists in any gun battle is a statistically-predictable element. The gun kata treats the gun as a total weapon, each fluid position representing a maximum kill zone, inflicting maximum damage on the maximum number of opponents, while keeping the defender clear of the statistically-traditional trajectories of return fire. By the rote mastery of this art, your firing efficiency will rise by no less than 120 percent. The difference of a 63 percent increased lethal proficiency makes the master of the gun katas an adversary not to be taken lightly.

Kata (型, かた) is a Japanese word for standard forms of movements and postures in karate, jujutsu, aikido, and many other traditional martial arts. The gun kata shown in Equilibrium is a hybrid of Wimmer's own style of gun kata (invented in his backyard).

== Production ==
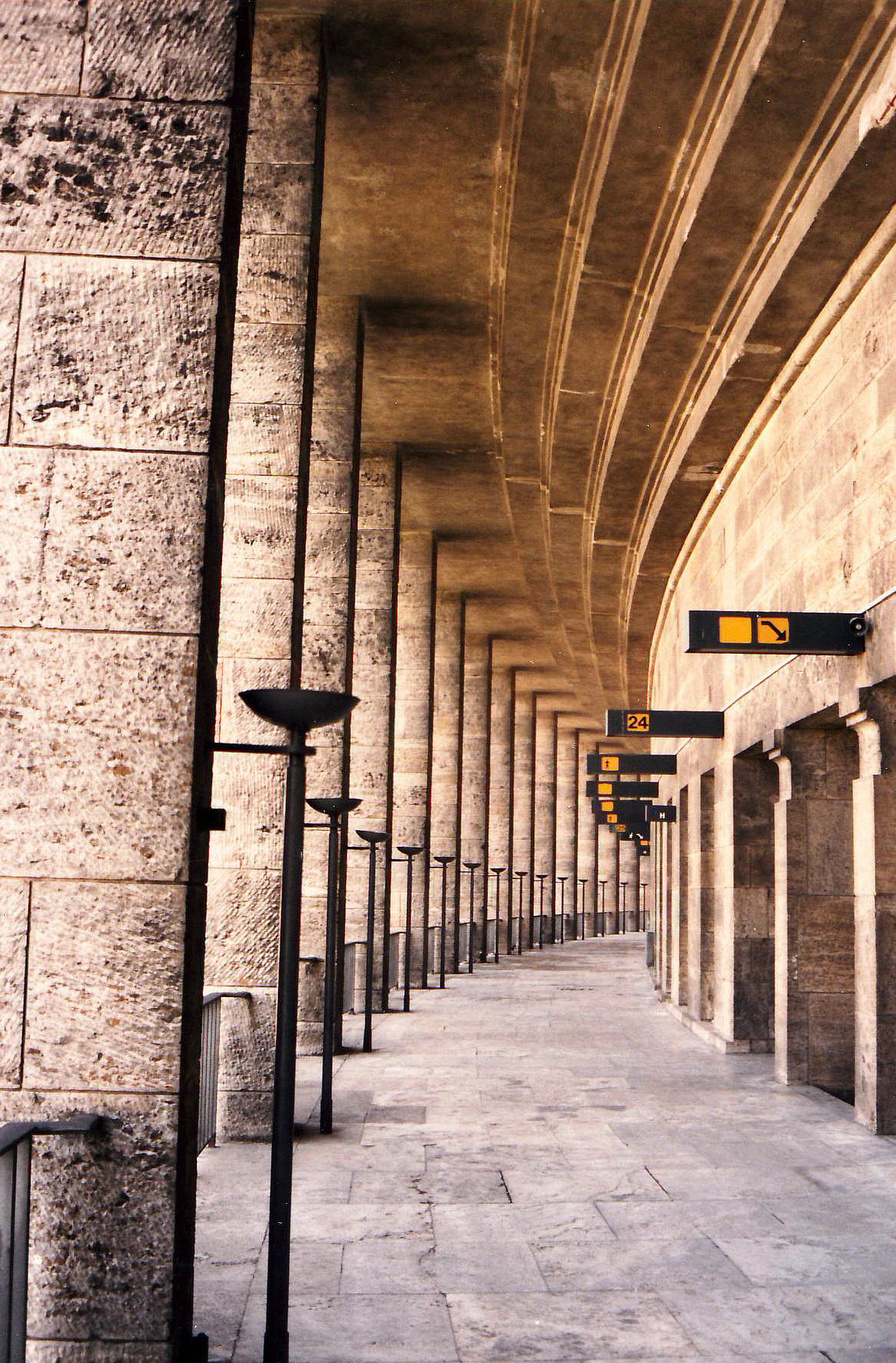
Olympic Stadium in Berlin, representing Librian government offices

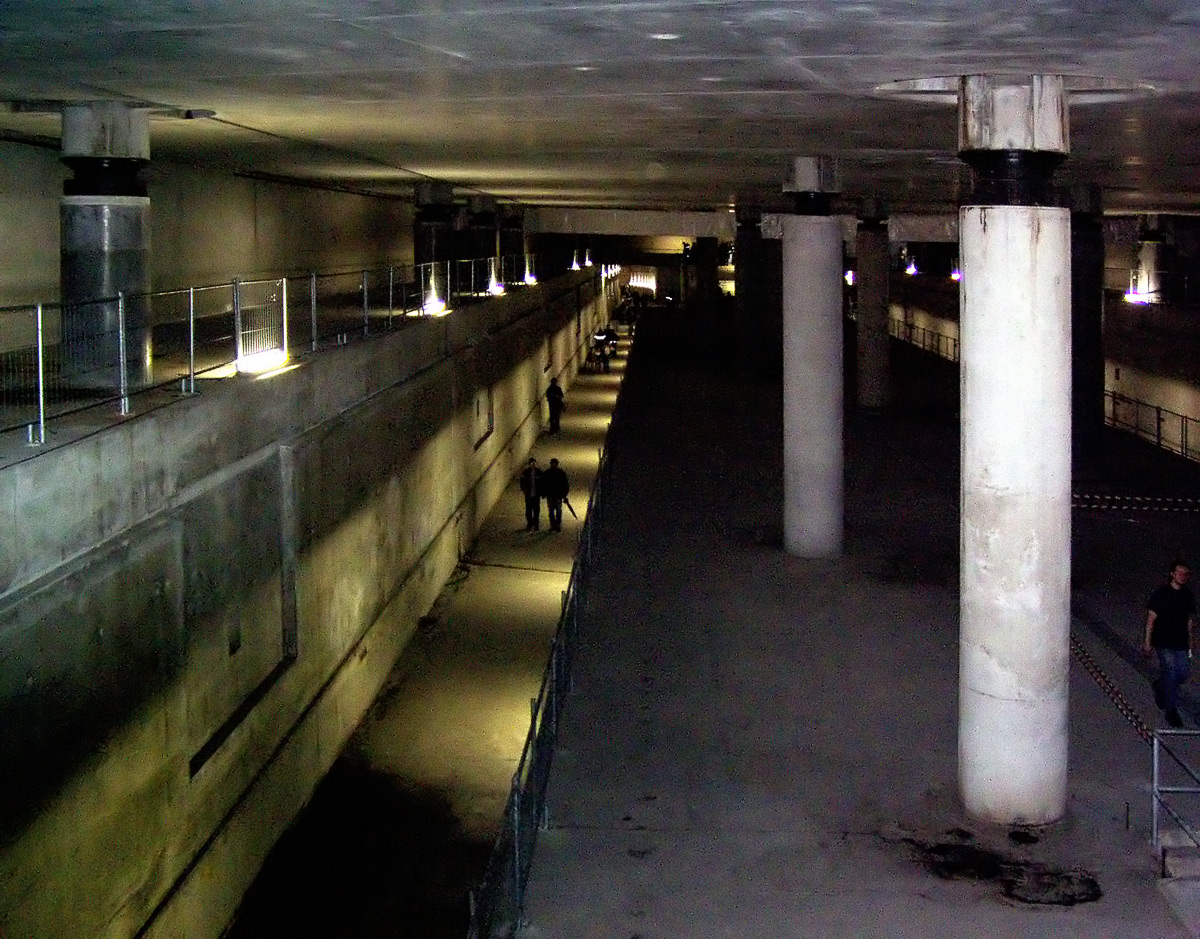
The Hall of Enforcement in Equilibrium, represented by the Bundestag (Berlin U-Bahn) subway station under the Reichstag building

Initially announced in 1999 under the title of Librium, the film was produced by Jan de Bont's production company, Blue Tulip Productions, with most of the budget secured in a Dutch tax incentive deal thanks to de Bont's Dutch citizenship. Emily Watson was cast in May 2000, with Christian Bale cast the following month in June of that year. Daniel Radcliffe auditioned for the role of Robbie Preston, but the role eventually went to Matthew Harbour; Radcliffe later stated that he was glad that he was not cast in the film because he felt wouldn't have been Harry Potter.

Filming began on October 19, 2000, and ended on December 10, 2000. Most of the filming used locations in Berlin, due to its unique mixture of fascist and modern architecture. According to the visual effects supervisor Tim McGovern, who worked alongside Wimmer, the fascist architecture was chosen "to make the individual feel small and insignificant so the government seems more powerful". The modern architecture of Berlin emphasizes the futuristic and stolid appearance of the city-state of Libria. Thick walls are represented by an abandoned East German military base, while the exterior of the city, where many of the surviving rebels reside, was filmed in decrepit neighborhoods of East Germany. In addition to the geographic location, a few European art directors also made substantial contributions to the production.

Equilibrium's locations include:

- Olympic Stadium (Berlin), built for the 1936 Summer Olympics.
- Deutschlandhalle, also built for the 1936 Summer Olympics.
- Brandenburg Gate in Berlin.
- Berlin Tempelhof Airport, construction of which was begun before the Nazi era, but which was completed during World War II and displays characteristics of the Nazis' architectural style.
- Bundestag (Berlin U-Bahn) station, a modern subway station near the new Reichstag building along with long tunnels of the Berlin U-Bahn underground railway. At the time the film was made, the Bundestag station was unopened, but in 2009, it went into service.
- Decrepit East German neighborhoods, as well as an abandoned massive former GDR military base.
- The EUR district in Rome, Italy, built during the fascist rule of Benito Mussolini.

Although making a science fiction movie, Wimmer intentionally avoided using futuristic technology that could become obsolete, and he also decided to set his story in an indeterminate future. "I wanted to create more of an alternate reality than get caught up in the gadgetry of science fiction," he explained. "In fact, there's no technology in Equilibrium that doesn't already exist. It's more like a parallel universe, the perfect setting for a parable."

== Reception ==
=== Critical response ===
The review aggregation website Rotten Tomatoes reports that 40% of 89 surveyed critics gave the film a positive review; the average rating is 4.8/10. The site's consensus states, "Equilibrium is a reheated mishmash of other sci-fi movies." Metacritic gave the film a score of 33 out of 100, based on reviews from 22 critics, indicating "generally unfavorable" reviews. Elvis Mitchell of The New York Times dismissed Equilibrium for having heavily borrowed from Fahrenheit 451, Nineteen Eighty-Four, Brave New World, Logan's Run and other science fiction classics. Roger Ebert awarded the film three stars out of four, noting that, "Equilibrium would be a mindless action picture, except that it has a mind. It doesn't do a lot of deep thinking, but unlike many futuristic combos of sf and f/x, it does make a statement."

Wimmer said in a Dreamwatch interview that "the paying customers seemed to get it", and said the critics "didn't seem to see that the film had a different message than" Fahrenheit 451 or 1984. Responding to the critics' views, Wimmer later said "Why would I make a movie for someone I wouldn't want to hang out with? Have you ever met a critic who you wanted to party with? I haven't."

=== Box office ===
The film had an estimated production budget of $20 million. International pre-release sales had already made a profit, so the studio reduced the film's promotion and advertising budget to avoid the risk of the film losing money; as a consequence, theatrical release was limited.

The film was shown in only 301 theaters at its widest release in the United States, earning $541,512 in its opening week, and only $1.2 million when it closed on December 26, 2002; the film earned $4.1 million internationally, for a total of $5.3 million worldwide.

== See also ==
- Equals (film)
- Turn Me On (film)
- List of dystopian films
- List of films featuring surveillance
- List of films set in the future
