= Kate Moyer =

Canadian actress (born 2007 or 2008)

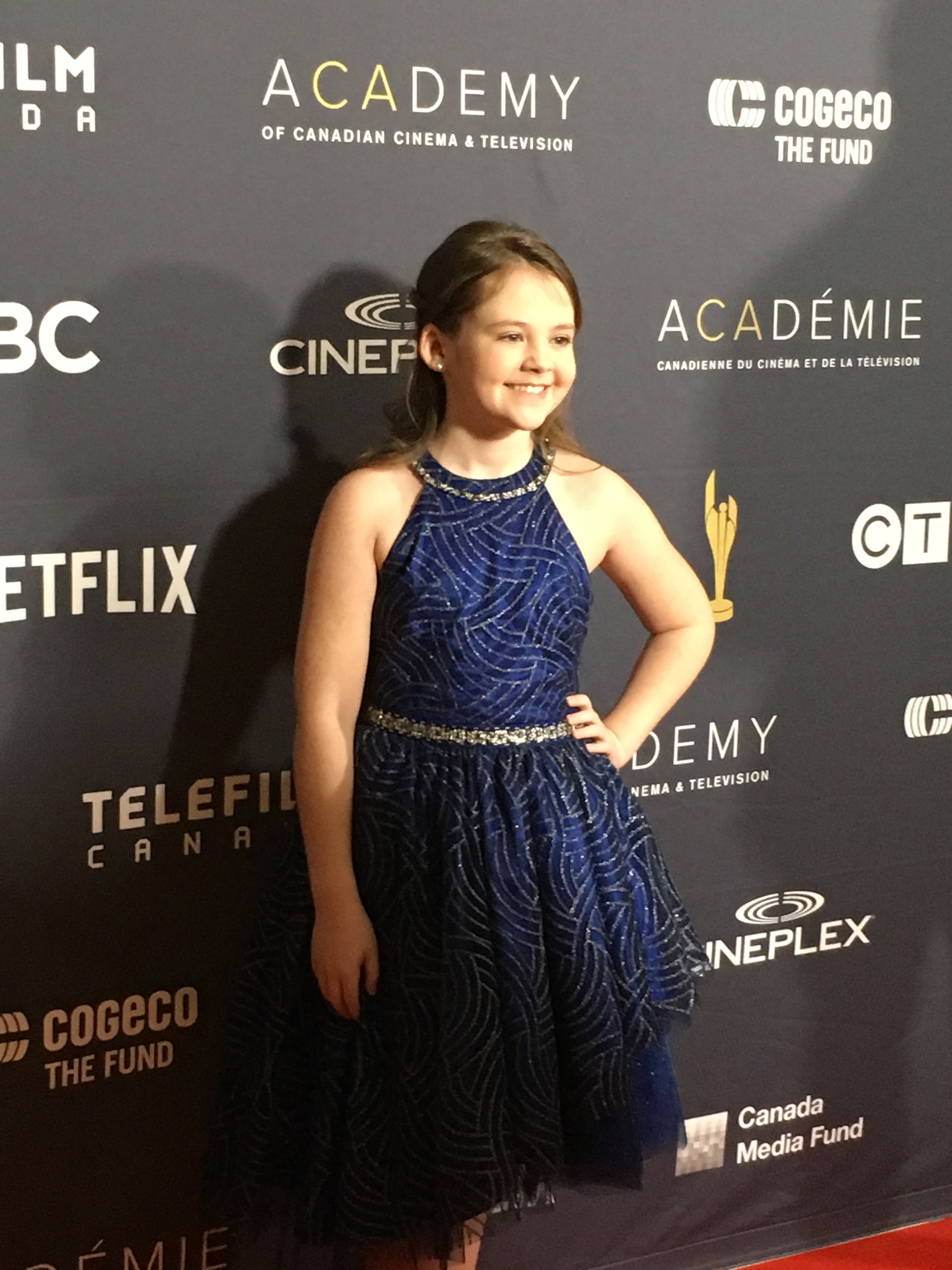
- Moyer in 2019
- Born: 2007 or 2008 (age 18–19)
- Occupation: Actress
- Years active: 2017–present
- Known for: Our House; Holly Hobbie; Children of the Corn; The Handmaid's Tale

Kate Moyer (born 2007 or 2008) is a Canadian teen actress.

== Career ==
In 2018, Moyer portrayed Heather Hobbie, the younger sister of Holly Hobbie in season 1 of the series Holly Hobbie, which aired on Hulu in the United States and subsequently on the Family Channel in Canada and again in season two in 2019. In 2021, Moyer reprised the role of Heather Hobbie as season 3 of Holly Hobbie was released. Moyer also appeared as Olivia in the Hallmark TV movie A Christmas in Tennessee. In 2019, Moyer appeared as Young Peggy in the film Buffaloed, as the young version of the lead character portrayed by Zoey Deutch and appearing opposite to Judy Greer. Moyer was also a guest star on the season three finale of Hulu's The Handmaid's Tale in the role of Kiki/Rebecca appearing alongside of Elizabeth Moss. Also in 2019, she was cast as Sofia, a young orphan, in season one of the Hallmark television series When Hope Calls. In 2020, she was cast as Eden Edwards in Children of the Corn. The completed film was given a limited release to a test audience in October 2020, before getting a wide release in 2023.

In December 2021, Moyer appears in the HBO Max limited series release of Station Eleven as Haley Butterscotch. In 2022, she was cast as Rose in a film Delia's Gone.

== Filmography ==
=== Film ===
List of Kate Moyer film credits
Year	Title	Role	Notes
2017	It	Esther	Uncredited
2018	Our House	Becca	
2019	Buffaloed	Young Peg	
2019	Dotage	Scarlet	
2020	Children of the Corn	Eden Edwards	
2022	Delia's Gone	Rose	

=== Television ===
List of Kate Moyer television credits
Year	Title	Role	Notes
2018	A Christmas in Tennessee	Olivia Brentley	Television film
2018–2022	Holly Hobbie	Heather Hobbie	50 episodes
2019	The Handmaid's Tale	Kiki	Episode: "Mayday"
2019	When Hope Calls	Sophia	9 episodes
2021–2022	Station Eleven	Haley Butterscotch	4 episodes
2022	Circuit Breakers	Genesis	1 episode
2024	Reacher	Jane Burns	Season 2, 2 episodes

== Awards and nominations ==
In 2019, she received a Canadian Screen Award nomination for Best Supporting Actress at the 7th Canadian Screen Awards for her performance in the film Our House. In 2020, Moyer was again nominated for a Canadian Screen Award in the TV category, Best Performance in a Children's or Youth Program or Series for her portrayal of Heather Hobbie in season 1 of Holly Hobbie.
