= Cleopatra Coleman =

Australian actress (born 1987)

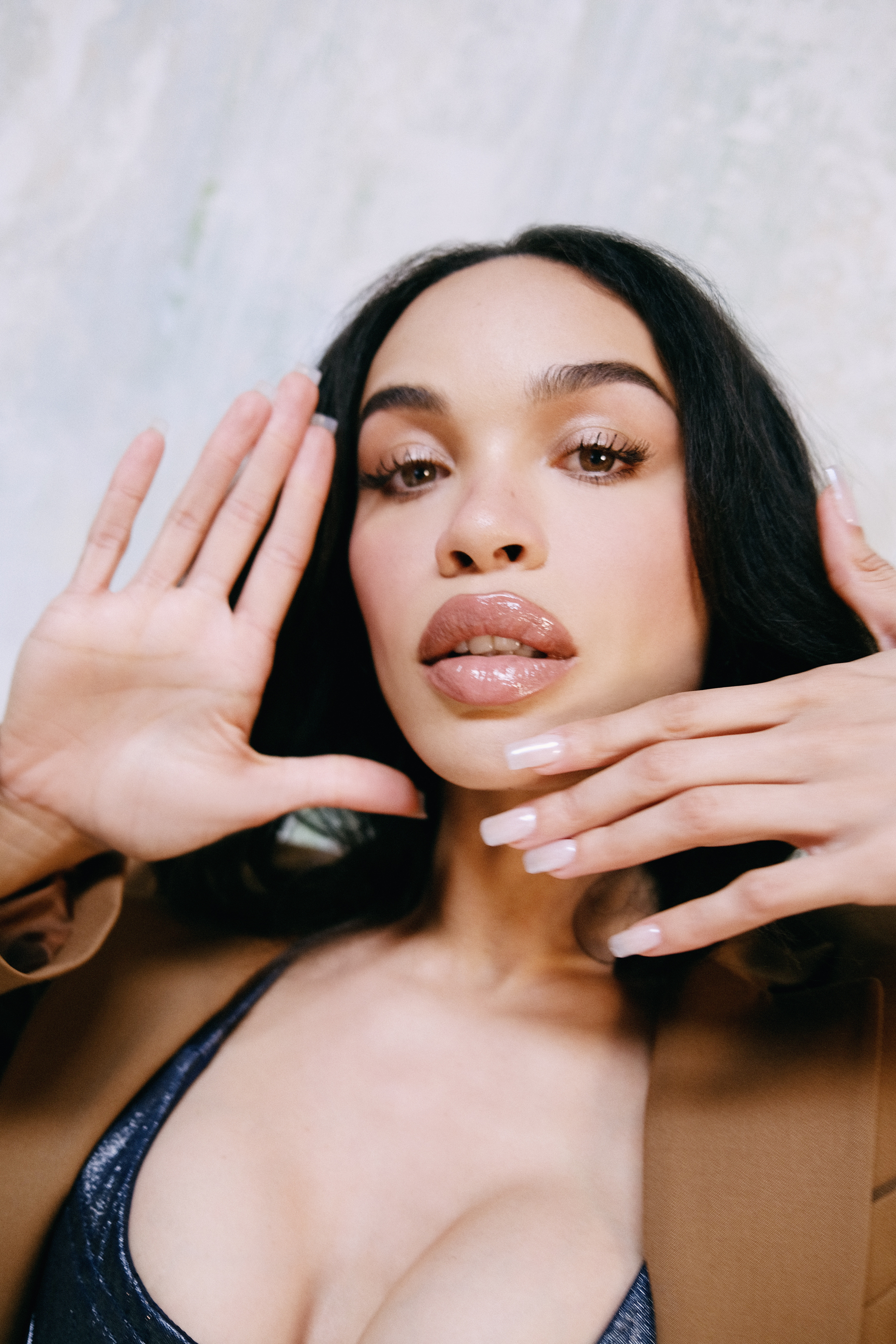
- Coleman in 2020
- Born: 29 October 1987 (age 38); Wentworth Falls, New South Wales, Australia
- Occupation: Actress
- Years active: 2004–present

Cleopatra Coleman (born 29 October 1987) is an Australian actress most notable for her role as Erica Dundee in the Fox comedy series The Last Man on Earth (2015–2018). Other credits include Silversun (2004), Neighbours (2006–2007), The Elephant Princess (2008–2009), Step Up Revolution (2012), White Famous (2017), In the Shadow of the Moon (2019), Now Apocalypse (2019), Dopesick (2021), Infinity Pool and Cobweb (2023), Clipped (2024), and Black Rabbit (2025).

== Early life ==
Coleman was born on 29 October 1987, in Wentworth Falls, New South Wales, Australia, and grew up in Byron Bay, the daughter of a Scottish father and a Jamaican mother. After high school, she visited Los Angeles and then moved there a few years later.

She trained at the National Theatre Drama School in St Kilda, Melbourne. A talented dancer, she reached the final of the 2002 National Dance Championships of Australia.

== Career ==
Coleman started her professional film and television career in her home country of Australia as a teenager In 2005, when she was cast in a main role in the sci-fi teenage drama Silversun for ABC and Seven Network.

In 2006, Coleman was cast as Glenn Forrest in the long running Australian soap opera Neighbours. Coleman went on to appear in other Australian television programs, including The Elephant Princess, Blue Heelers, Holly's Heroes, Wicked Science, City Homicide and Rush.

In 2008, Coleman appeared in a stage production of Simon Stephens' Motortown with Melbourne's Red Stitch Actors Theatre, receiving positive reviews. In 2011, a first project for Coleman/Coleman productions, alongside her father, Mick Coleman, co-wrote, executive-produced, and starred in the short film Trains.

In 2012, she was cast in her breakout motion picture role as DJ Penelope in Step Up Revolution (2012). She also featured in multiple music videos by Nervo ("You're Gonna Love Again"), Far East Movement ("Change Your Life") and Galantis ("Runaway (U & I)") in 2014.

In 2014, Coleman was cast as a series regular in the Fox ensemble comedy series The Last Man on Earth. She played the role of Erica Dundee for four seasons.

In 2016, Coleman guest-starred in the series Better Things. A year later, she wrote, produced, and starred in the environmental Syfy thriller Hover. She starred as Sadie Lewis in the 2017 Showtime comedy White Famous.

In 2019, she guest-starred in Gregg Araki's Now Apocalypse, and the series Sorry for Your Loss. She appeared as Rya in the Jim Mickle directed Netflix film In the Shadow of the Moon (2019). In 2020, Coleman played Trina in the Robert Schwartzman directed quirky independent comedy The Argument.

In 2021, Coleman played Sarah, the female lead of The Right One, a romantic comedy released through Lionsgate, and starred in the music video for "Ceremony" by Deftones, directed by Leigh Whannel. Also in 2021, she played Grace Pell and worked alongside Michael Keaton and Kaitlyn Dever in the miniseries drama Dopesick.

In 2023, she starred in a film directed by Samuel Bodin and co-starring Lizzy Caplan and Antony Starr, playing Miss Devine in Cobweb (2023). She then starred alongside Alexander Skarsgard and Mia Goth in Brandon Cronenberg's film Infinity Pool (2023).

She also starred as Devra Bloodaxe in Zack Snyder's Netflix original sci-fi fantasy epic Rebel Moon – Part One: A Child of Fire (2023), and Rebel Moon – Part Two: The Scargiver (2024).

== Personal life ==
From 2017 to 2021, Coleman dated Canadian actor Avan Jogia. Fans of the duo started to speculate whether or not they broke up by 2021 upon noticing that they unfollowed each other on social media that year.

== Filmography ==
=== Film ===
Year	Title	Role	Notes
2012	Step Up Revolution	DJ Penelope	
2014	Fear Clinic	Megan	
2017	Take the 10	Sahara	
2018	Hover	Claudia	Also writer
2019	In the Shadow of the Moon	Rya	
2019	James vs. His Future Self	Courtney	
2020	The Argument	Trina	
2021	The Right One	Sara	
2022	A Lot of Nothing	Vanessa	
2023	Infinity Pool	Em Foster	
2023	Cobweb	Miss Devine	
2023	Rebel Moon – Part One: A Child of Fire	Devra Bloodaxe	
2024	Rebel Moon – Part Two: The Scargiver	Devra Bloodaxe	

=== Television ===
Year	Title	Role	Notes
2004	Silversun	Zandie Brokow	23 episodes
2005	Blue Heelers	Skye Clarke	Episode: "Sex Sells"
2005	Holly's Heroes	Stacey	2 episodes
2005–2006	Wicked Science 2	Emma Hellman	8 episodes
2006–2007	Neighbours	Glenn Forrest	13 episodes
2008–2009	The Elephant Princess	Cosma	7 episodes
2009	City Homicide	Sian Ritchie	Episode: "Time of Your Life"
2010	Rush	Jessica Hamilton	Episode #3.17
2015	Comedy Bang! Bang!	Katie	Episode: "Uzo Aduba Wears a White Blouse and Royal Blue Heels"
2015–2018	The Last Man on Earth	Erica Dundee	57 episodes
2016	Better Things	Dr. Okoye	Episode: "Period"
2017	White Famous	Sadie Lewis	7 episodes
2019	Now Apocalypse	Ajia	2 episodes
2019	Sorry for Your Loss	Simone	Episode: "I'm Here"
2021	The Eric Andre Show	Herself	1 episode
2021	Dopesick	Grace Pell	5 episodes
2024	Clipped	V. Stiviano	5 episodes
2025	Black Rabbit	Estelle	8 episodes
2026	Nemesis	Ebony Wilder	8 episodes

=== Video games ===
Year	Title	Role	Notes
2024	Rebel Moon – The Descent	Devra Bloodaxe	
