= Richard Wershe Jr. =

Former drug trafficker and FBI informant

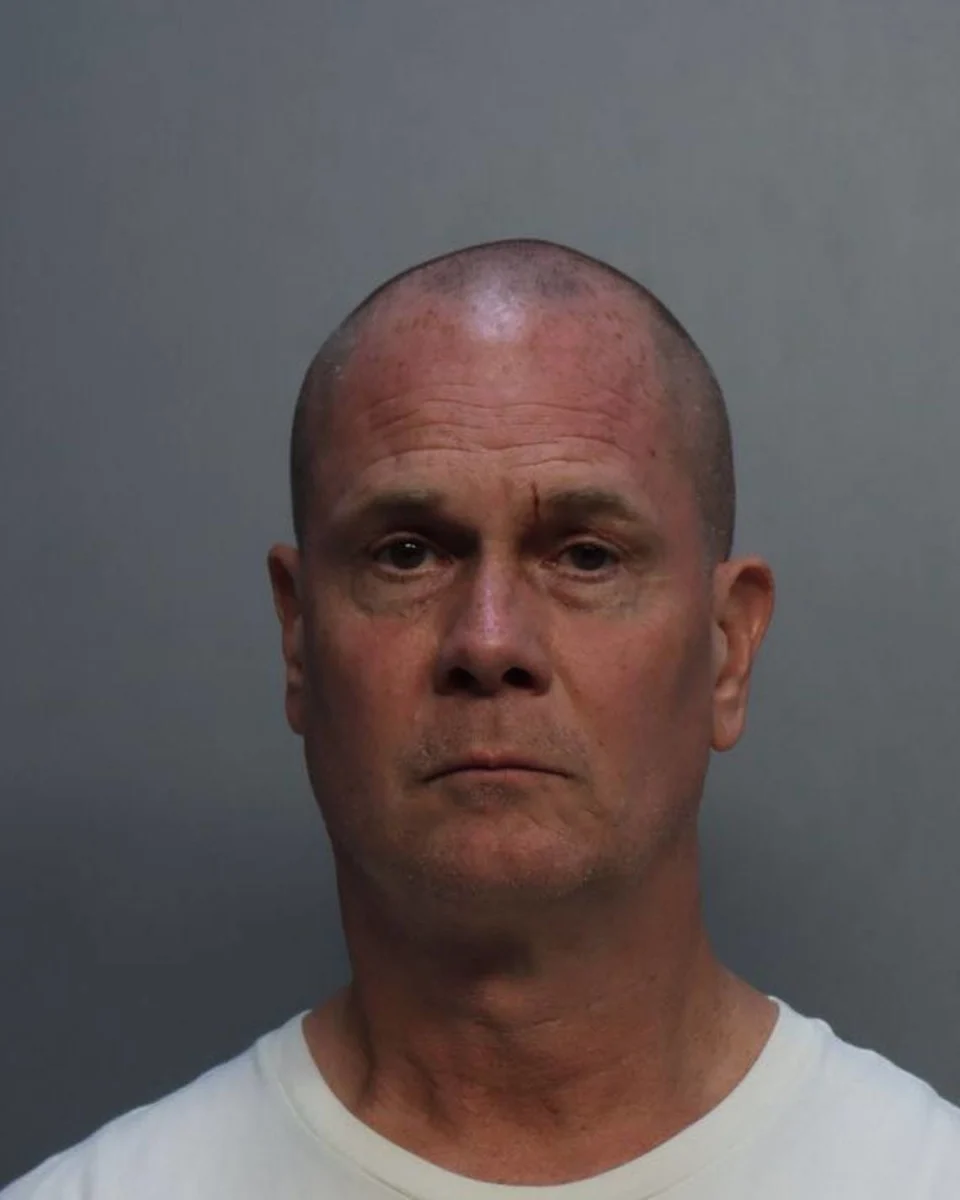
- Wershe in 2023
- Born: Richard John Wershe Jr. July 18, 1969 (age 57); Detroit, Michigan, U.S.
- Status: Released on July 20, 2020
- Other name: "White Boy Rick"
- Known for: F.B.I. informant at age 14; Spending 27 years in prison for a drug offence committed when he was 17
- Criminal charge: Possession of cocaine in excess of eight kg Racketeering (Conspiracy to Commit)
- Criminal penalty: 27 years imprisonment 5 years imprisonment consecutive
- Children: 3

Richard Wershe Jr. (born July 18, 1969), known as "White Boy Rick", is an American former drug trafficker and Federal Bureau of Investigation (FBI) informant. The youngest known informant in the history of the FBI, Wershe became a confidential informant when he was 14 to 16 years old. When he was 15, Wershe told the FBI that a major drug dealer had spoken of paying a bribe to Detroit detective inspector and subsequent city council president and mayoral candidate Gil Hill in order to quash the investigation into a 13-year-old boy's murder.

At the age of 17, Wershe was arrested for possession of 8 kg of cocaine and he was sentenced to life imprisonment. In 2017, justice campaigners publicized Wershe's case and he was subsequently paroled, but directly to a prison in Florida to serve another five years for an auto theft conviction from 2008. Campaigners for Wershe have suggested to reporters that the length of his incarceration may have been connected to him having provided the FBI with information leading to the arrest of family members and associates of former Detroit mayor Coleman A. Young, as well as the allegation about Young's political ally Hill. In 2016, notorious former Detroit-based hitman Nate "Boone" Craft alleged Hill had once tried to commission the murder of Wershe.

== Life ==
Wershe and his working class family lived in a neighborhood on the east side of Detroit about seven miles (11 km) from the city center. They lived there during a period from the mid 1980s to early 1990s when Detroit and many other major American cities were gaining widespread reputations for crime and violence, largely due to an influx of cocaine and the emergence of the crack cocaine epidemic. Wershe's father was also an FBI informant and first reported to the police and the federal agency alongside him before going solo.

The name "White Boy Rick" was not a street name that Wershe used himself, nor was it one he was ever called by those with whom he associated. The name was instead given to him by reporters who covered his case. When Wershe was 16 the FBI, having secured 20 convictions through his infiltration of a violent drug gang, ceased to employ him as an informant. In 1987, at 17 years of age, Wershe was arrested for possessing cocaine in excess of eight kilograms (18 pounds).

He was sentenced to life in prison in Michigan under the state's 650-Lifer Law, a drug statute passed in 1973 that penalized those found in possession of more than 650 grams (23 ounces) of cocaine or heroin with life imprisonment without parole. The law was overturned, but he was rejected as a menace to society by the Michigan Parole Board in 2003, despite (or perhaps because of) having assisted the FBI in the 1990s with a sting unsuccessfully targeting Gil Hill and drawing in the relatives of influential city politicians. Publicity about the case in 2017, by which time he had spent nearly three decades behind bars in Michigan as a nonviolent drug offender whose offense was committed when he was 17, led to him being paroled, but directly to US Marshals who took him to begin serving five years in Florida State Prison on a 2008 car theft ring conviction (crime committed behind bars). In 2019, his application was denied by the Florida clemency board.

On July 20, 2020, Wershe was released from custody in Florida, having completed his sentence with credits for good behavior.

In July 2021, Wershe sued the FBI, saying in the lawsuit that: "Had I not been an informant for the task force, I would never have gotten involved with drug gangs or criminality of any sort", and that the FBI's actions amounted to child abuse.

== In media ==
White Boy, a documentary chronicling the case of Richard Wershe Jr., premiered on March 31, 2017, at the Freep Film Festival where it won the Audience Choice Award. It began airing on the Starz network in 2019 and was picked up by Netflix in April 2021.

White Boy Rick, a film based on his life, was released on September 14, 2018.

Eminem made a cameo appearance as Wershe on the TV show BMF.
