= Come True =

2020 horror film

- Official Poster
- Directed by: Anthony Scott Burns
- Screenplay by: Anthony Scott Burns
- Story by: Anthony Scott Burns; Daniel Weissenberger
- Produced by: Steve Hoban; Mark Smith; Brent Kawchuk
- Starring: Julia Sarah Stone; Landon Liboiron
- Cinematography: Anthony Scott Burns
- Edited by: Anthony Scott Burns
- Music by: Electric Youth and Pilotpriest
- Production companies: Copperheart Entertainment; Angel Entertainment
- Distributed by: IFC Midnight
- Release dates: August 30, 2020 (Fantasia Film Festival); March 12, 2021 (United States)
- Running time: 105 minutes
- Country: Canada
- Language: English
- Box office: $62,080

Come True is a Canadian science fiction horror film written and directed by Anthony Scott Burns. The film stars Julia Sarah Stone and Landon Liboiron. The film plot follows a teenage runaway who takes part in a sleep study that becomes a nightmarish descent into the depths of her mind and a frightening examination of the power of dreams.

== Plot ==
High schooler Sara Dunn has a troubled relationship with her mother, whom she constantly avoids. Essentially homeless, she steals food from her mother's house and sleeps in a sleeping bag outdoors or at friends' homes. Her sleep environment affects her ability to stay awake in class and throughout the day. She is also plagued by surreal nightmares of a dark maze and a shadowy figure with glowing eyes.

Needing money, Sara agrees to be a test subject in a sleep study, the intent and goal of which are classified. At first, Sara sleeps well but, after two sessions, her nightmares begin to worsen. She learns that one of the scientists, a young man nicknamed Riff, has been following her outside of the study. The only other woman in the study, Emily, seemingly drops out. Sara has a panic attack when a scientist shows her a picture of the same shadowy figure from the nightmares, and she becomes fed up with the fact none of them will divulge the purpose of the study. The head scientist, Dr. Meyer, disallows the younger scientists using unapproved study methods because of what happened to Sara.

Sara eventually passes out from seeing a shadowy figure in a laundromat and is robbed of her phone. Sara confronts Riff, insisting that the study has had a negative impact on her and that she will only continue with it if he reveals the study's purpose. He says that the experiment involves monitoring subjects' dreams using a brain scanning device that converts brainwaves into images.

During the next session, Sara and the rest of the experiment volunteers all dream of the same shadowy figure. Riff states that, across the world and throughout history, people have dreamed of a similar figure, which has also haunted him since childhood. As their vitals spike, Sara wakes up in a panic, bleeding from her left eye, and runs away after saying that she knows what the other scientists are doing. Riff pursues her as she runs to a club in search of her friend Zoe but passes out, forcing him to carry her unconscious body.

At the lab, the two remaining volunteers continue dreaming of the figure. Becoming semiconscious from sleep paralysis, they see the figure standing at the foot of their beds. It moves around in the waking world. After a scientist goes into the volunteers' room, the figure reaches for him and the volunteers sit up awake with white eyes, causing the monitoring system to shut down.

Sara wakes up from a nightmare involving the figure and finds herself in Riff's apartment, where he straps himself to his bed and monitors his own dreams. She sees his dream in which the two of them grow fangs and kiss. Then he has the same dream of the figure while entering sleep paralysis. Sara wakes him before the figure reaches him. Traumatized and exhausted, they have sex, during which Sara sees two shadow figures and passes out again. Riff takes her to a hospital.

While waiting for a report of Sara's status, Riff begins to dream of a dark maze and a humanoid figure in the waking world. He then learns that Sara has left her room and wandered out of the hospital. She is sleepwalking and her eyes bleed when Riff tries to wake her. He calls his colleague Anita and urges her to help monitor Sara's dreaming as she sleepwalks through the city.

Anita and Riff attach a mobile monitor to Sara's head as she unconsciously leads them to a remote, wooded area. Sara's dream mimics the path she is taking, with shadowy figures manifesting on the monitor, seeming to flank the trio. As they enter a field, the monitor shows Sara approaching a large citadel, before Riff finds a cellphone ringing in the grass. When he answers the call, Sara wakes up screaming.

Riff comforts Sara, who identifies the phone as hers, despite the fact that she has never been there before. The phone screen grows static and, though awake, Sara sees shadow figures in the trees. The trio flee, but darkness swallows Anita and Riff as a shadow figure approaches Sara.

Sara then wakes up again in Riff's apartment, naked and straddling Riff's dead body, having apparently gouged out his eyes in a sleepwalking episode. She goes to the bathroom and receives a text message that makes her laugh. She examines her reflection, discovering that she has fangs, like in Riff's dream.

The message says that she has been in a coma for twenty years, she is being studied using a new technique, and the scientists are not sure where in her dream the message will reach her. It begs her to wake up.

== Cast ==
- Julia Sarah Stone as Sarah
- Landon Liboiron as Jeremy (Riff)
- Tiffany Helm as Old Woman
- Chantal Perron as Erin
- Tedra Rogers as Zoe
- Orin McCusker as Peter
- Carlee Ryski as Anita
- Millie Jayne as Washroom Girl

== Release ==
Come True had its world premiere in Canada at the 2020 Fantasia Film Festival on August 30, 2020. It was released in select theaters and on VOD platforms on March 12, 2021, by IFC Midnight in America.

== Reception ==
On the review aggregator website Rotten Tomatoes, 86% of 86 critics' reviews are positive, with an average rating of 7.1/10. The website's critical consensus reads, "Well-acted and visually striking, Come True offers an eerily effective reminder of how the sleeping subconscious can be fertile ground for horror." On Metacritic, the movie received a score of 68 based on 17 reviews, indicating "generally favorable reviews".

The film received two Canadian Screen Award nominations at the 10th Canadian Screen Awards in 2022, for Best Director (Burns) and Best Actress (Stone).
