= Nathan Parker (writer) =

English screenwriter

- Born: London, England
- Occupation: Screenwriter
- Father: Alan Parker

Nathan Parker is an English screenwriter.

He was nominated for a British Independent Film Award for Best Screenplay at the British Independent Film Awards 2009 and a BAFTA Award for Outstanding British Film at the 63rd British Academy Film Awards for the 2009 film Moon, and a Canadian Screen Award for Best Adapted Screenplay at the 7th Canadian Screen Awards for the 2018 film Our House.

In addition to his screenplays, he directed the short film Remember Alice Bell? in 2011.

He is the son of filmmaker Sir Alan Parker (1944–2020).

== Filmography ==
- Moon (2009)
- Blitz (2011)
- Remember Alice Bell? (2011)
- Equals (2015)
- 2:22 (2017)
- Our House (2018)
- The Underground Railroad (2021) Episodes 2, 5 and 6.
- Slingshot (2024)
