= Anthony Scott Burns =

Canadian filmmaker, recording artist (born 1977)

- Born: 1977 (age 48–49); Kitchener, Ontario, Canada
- Other name: Pilotpriest
- Occupations: Filmmaker, visual effects artist, musician, composer
- Years active: 1995–present

Anthony Scott Burns (born 1977) is a Canadian filmmaker, visual effects artist and musician.

Burns also releases music under the moniker Pilotpriest.

== Early life ==
Anthony Scott Burns was born in Kitchener, Ontario in 1977. He was interested in film at a young age, and began building small models he dubbed "parallel universes". He began working on films at the age of 16, and by 18 was making films, with several of his shorts winning local awards. He is a self-taught director, cinematographer, and animator.

== Career ==
At 18, he moved to Toronto where he landed a job at a boutique design firm and later was hired by MTV Canada as Senior Designer, where he oversaw the creation and direction of all MTV's on-air interstitials in Canada.

In May 2011, after viewing some of the work Burns had created over the years, Helios Productions announced it had hired Burns to direct a thriller/sci-fi feature entitled Dark Matter, written by Hugh Sterbakov. Filming began in November 2011 in Canada. As of 2012, Burns was based in Toronto. In 2012, he was the visual effects supervisor for The Last Will and Testament of Rosalind Leigh, and that September he released the trailer for Epoch, a short film constructed from footage for a music video. In 2013, he also continued to do commercial shorts and trailers for his then unreleased short narrative film Manifold were released in September 2013. A "tech-noir narrative" and starring Stephen McHattie and Greg Calderone, Manifold premiered in the United States at Fantastic Fest 2013. The online release of Manifold was a Vimeo staff pick, and was named "Short of the Week" at ShortoftheWeek.com in January 2014. In November 2014, he was brought in to direct the sci-fi thriller Alpha, which is being produced by Brad Pitt and Plan B Entertainment. In February 2015, XYZ Films hired him, as one of the directors, who will direct the anthology film Holidays, along with directors such as Scott Stewart, Nicholas McCarthy, Kevin Smith.

According to vice.com, Anthony Scott Burns started to direct a film called Breathing, and hired Bronwyn Griffin and Austin Garrick to score it. However, due to differences in creative direction during post-production, Burns left the project, shortly followed by Electric Youth. They then chose to release the 23 tracks score they composed in an album called Breathing (Original Motion Picture Soundtrack From A Lost Film).

He was a Canadian Screen Award nominee for Best Director at the 10th Canadian Screen Awards in 2022 for Come True.

== Filmography ==
Selected film credits for Anthony Scott Burns
Year	Release title	Type	Role
2012	The Last Will and Testament of Rosalind Leigh	Feature film	Visual effects supervisor
2012	Epoch	Short film	Director, visual effects, story
2013	The Last Exorcism Part II	Feature film	Visual effects artist
2013	Manifold	Short film	Director, cinematographer, writer, editor
2013	The Flying Man	Short film	Cinematographer, editor
2013	Angels, Antiques & Apparitions	Short documentary	Appearance as self
2014	Darknet	TV series	Directed episode 5, cinematographer
2016	Holidays	Anthology film	Segment director
2018	Our House	Feature Film	Director
2020	Come True	Feature Film	Writer, Director
