= Kinski =

Kinski may refer to:

== People and groups ==
- Klaus Kinski né Nakszynski (1926–1991), German actor
  - Pola Kinski (born 1952), German actress, daughter of Klaus
  - Nastassja Kinski (born 1961), German-born model and actress, daughter of Klaus
  - Kenya Kinski-Jones (born 1993), model, daughter of Nastassja Kinski and Quincy Jones
  - Nikolai Kinski (born 1976), actor, son of Klaus and half-brother of Nastassja
  - Debora Caprioglio, (born 1968), formerly known as Debora Kinski, Italian actress and ex-wife of Klaus
- Katya, Rachel and Zeke Kinski, characters from Australian soap opera Neighbours, or their stepmother Susan
- Sonja Kinski (born 1986), American model and actress
- Kinski Gallo, Mexican-born musician and artist
- Kinski (band), a post-rock group from Seattle, WA

== Geography ==
- Kinski Rozdory, a settlement in Ukraine
- Konka (river, Zaporizhzhia Oblast), also known as the Kinski Vody

== See also ==
- Kinskey
- Kinský (surname)
- House of Kinsky
