= All I Need Is Love =

1975 autobiography by Klaus Kinski

- First edition cover artwork by Klaus Kinski
- Author: Klaus Kinski
- Translator: Klaus Kinski
- Cover artist: Klaus Kinski
- Subject: Autobiography
- Publisher: Random House
- Publication date: November 28, 1988
- Media type: Print (hardback)
- Pages: 265 pp (first edition)
- ISBN: 0-394-54916-3
- OCLC: 18379547

All I Need Is Love: A Memoir is the autobiography of the German actor Klaus Kinski first published 1975 in German under the title Ich bin so wild nach deinem Erdbeermund (English: "I am so wild about your strawberry mouth"). The first translation into English was released in 1988, then soon withdrawn from publication. After the author's death, it was retranslated, retitled, and republished in 1996 as Kinski Uncut: The Autobiography of Klaus Kinski.

== Reception ==
When the 1988 edition was published, Klaus Kinski's daughter, Nastassja Kinski, sued her father for libel but the lawsuit was quickly withdrawn. The 1988 edition was withdrawn from publication because of a copyright dispute between Random House and a West German publisher, and because Marlene Dietrich threatened to sue for libel. The book was republished in 1996 after Dietrich had died, and the second edition is more cautious in naming names.

The book itself was celebrated as hedonistic, excessive and pornographic; however, reviews largely ignored the fact that Kinski had already raved about incest with his mother, sister and daughter.

In the book Herzog on Herzog, Werner Herzog describes the book as "highly fictitious", and says that Klaus Kinski did not grow up in abject poverty. Herzog also relates how he and Kinski together sought new insults to describe Herzog for the book.

Kinskis elder daughter Pola Kinski (*1952) played with the original title when she published her own autobiography "Kindermund", which described the incestuous relationship her father established with her when she was a young child. The book received praise for its insight into the victim's perspective.

== Chapters ==
The book is written entirely in the present tense, and rarely gives temporal references. It is divided into five chapters:

Chapter One describes his early life up to his discovery of sex and his outrageous desire for it. Chapter Two deals with his short career in the military, his first theatre experiences and successes, his entrance into an insane asylum. The third chapter deals with his comeback. Chapter Four tells a strange story about a large worm. Critics regard it as a departure from the form. Chapter Five deals with his marriage.

== Editions ==
Kinski Uncut
- Author: Klaus Kinski
- Translator: Joachim Neugröschel
- Subject: Autobiography
- Publisher: Viking Press
- Publication date: August 1, 1996
- Media type: Print (hardback)
- Pages: 336 pp (second edition)
- ISBN: 0-670-86744-6
- OCLC: 34322866

The manuscript was written in German. It was translated by the author and was published as a book in English in 1988. It was retranslated by Joachim Neugröschel and reissued in 1996 with a new title. Each edition has material omitted from the other.

- Kinski, Klaus (November 28, 1988). All I Need Is Love: A Memoir. Translated by Klaus Kinski. Cover artwork by Klaus Kinski (1st ed.). New York: Random House. pp. 265. ISBN 0-394-54916-3. OCLC 18379547.
- Kinski, Klaus (August 1, 1996) [First published 1988]. Kinski Uncut: The Autobiography of Klaus Kinski. Translated by Joachim Neugröschel (2nd ed.). New York: Viking. pp. 336. ISBN 0-670-86744-6. OCLC 34322866.
