= Freewheelin' Woman =

Studio album by Jewel
- Released: April 15, 2022
- Studio: Ruby Red Studios (Santa Monica, California)
- Length: 44:53
- Label: Words Matter Media
- Producer: Jewel; Butch Walker

Jewel chronology
Picking Up the Pieces (2015)	Freewheelin' Woman (2022)

Singles from Freewheelin' Woman
- 1. "No More Tears" Released: November 14, 2019; 2. "Grateful" Released: April 7, 2020; 3. "Dancing Slow" Released: February 23, 2022; 4. "Long Way 'Round" Released: March 18, 2022

Freewheelin' Woman is the thirteenth studio album by American singer-songwriter Jewel, released on April 15, 2022, via her own label, Words Matter Media. It is Jewel's first album in seven years, following 2015's Picking Up the Pieces. The album was co-produced by Jewel and Butch Walker and was developed with the intention for Jewel to create music that she felt connected to and excited about rather than creating in order to meet expectations. Lyrically, the album touches on themes of independence, hope, womanhood, and heartbreak.

== Background ==
Jewel recorded the album live with a band and was partly inspired by famous R&B and soul records made in Muscle Shoals, Alabama, with the artist stating, "I cut my teeth on singers like Ella Fitzgerald, Dusty Springfield, and Sarah Vaughan and got into those Muscle Shoals records a little later on, and for some reason that's where my voice and my writing wanted to go on this album".

Regarding the musical diversity, Jewel explained that "the record is definitely showing influences I haven't been able to pay homage to before" and added, "I always have thousands of songs in my back catalog, and so I was always able to just instantly have at least ten songs that I was going to use for a record in any genre" but that "It's the first time I ever challenged myself to write a record from scratch. I wanted it to be exactly who and where I was now". When discussing the gap between Picking Up the Pieces and Freewheelin' Woman, Jewel confessed that "I've always taken a lot of years between records when I feel like I need time to psychologically adjust or to creatively reload. I think writing, for me, evolves and changes. I have to have a lot of input. I like to read a lot. I like to experience a lot so I have new things to write about".

In November 2019, Jewel released "No More Tears", her first new song in four years, for the soundtrack to Lost in America, a documentary by American filmmaker Rotimi Rainwater about youth homelessness, of which Jewel was an executive producer. Speaking to American Songwriter, she stated that she was inspired to write the track because she was moved by the stories of the individuals featured in the film and related those to her own experiences of being homeless when she was eighteen. In the same interview, it was confirmed that "No More Tears" would also be the first track from her upcoming album, which she hoped to release sometime in 2020. A re-recorded version of the track, featuring country singer Darius Rucker, is included on Freewheelin' Woman.

"Grateful", the second single from the then as-yet untitled album, was released in April 2020. In an interview with Rolling Stone, Jewel expressed that the song was written about her experiences with anxiety and the crucial role that perception plays in processing your emotions, explaining that, "I learned that if I was headed into a panic attack, I could hack my way into a dilated state by focusing very hard on a different feeling. I chose gratitude. It's amazing how profound such a single thing can be if you feel it deeply enough. It's a practice I still use today. I'm pleased to release this new song inspired by the transformative capability of a simple feeling".

On February 23, 2022, Jewel officially announced that her new album, titled Freewheelin' Woman, would be released on April 15. Alongside this announcement, she previewed the album's lead single, "Dancing Slow", which features American rock band Train, whom she would be supporting on their AM Gold Tour between June and August 2022. In a statement about the track, Jewel explained that "Dancing Slow" is "ultimately about the ebb and flow of life and cherishing those moments of certainty that are shared when you're with a trusted companion. It feels like time slows down for a moment. I'm so glad Train was able to join me on this track, with Pat Monahan's sweet vocals adding another layer to the melody".

The final pre-release track from the album, "Long Way 'Round", was shared in March 2022, with Jewel describing it as "a song about overcoming something difficult, even if it requires getting lost or taking the longer way around. I'm celebrating some of the things I've overcome as well as the choices I've made that have brought me to where I am today. The heart and mind are powerful muscles that are always willing to adapt and grow when you let them".

== Track listing ==
All lyrics are written by Jewel Kilcher.

Freewheelin' Woman track listing
No.	Title	Music	Length
1.	"Long Way 'Round"	Kilcher; Steve Poltz	4:05
2.	"Dancing Slow" (featuring Train)	Kilcher; Dave Bassett	3:20
3.	"Alibis"	Kilcher; Grant Phillip Michaels; Sam S. Hollander	2:54
4.	"Grateful"	Kilcher; Hollander	4:17
5.	"Half Life"	Kilcher	3:56
6.	"Almost"	Kilcher	4:17
7.	"Dance Sing Laugh Love"	Kilcher; Michaels; Hollander	3:23
8.	"Living with Your Memory"	Kilcher; Michaels; Hollander	3:14
9.	"No More Tears" (featuring Darius Rucker)	Kilcher; Tommee Profitt	3:34
10.	"When You Loved Me"	Kilcher	4:00
11.	"Love Wins"	Kilcher	3:42
12.	"Nothing But Love"	Kilcher	4:11
Total length:			44:53

== Personnel ==
- Jewel – lead vocals, backing vocals, acoustic guitar
- Aaron Embry – keyboards, acoustic piano
- Butch Walker – keyboards, guitars, bass, drums, percussion, backing vocals
- Val McCallum – guitars (2, 4, 5, 11)
- Paul Bryan – bass
- Mark Stepro – drums
- Solomon Dorsey – congas (1, 3, 4, 7, 8), percussion (1, 3, 4, 7, 8)
- Karl Hunter – horns (1, 3–5, 7, 8, 11)
- Jacob Scesney – horns (1, 3–5, 7, 8, 11)
- Rubén Salinas – horns (1, 3–5, 7, 8, 11)
- Train – instruments and vocals (2)
- The Watson Twins – backing vocals (2–5, 7, 8)
- Darius Rucker – lead vocals (9)

Production

- Jewel – producer
- Butch Walker – producer, engineer
- Todd Stopera – assistant engineer
- Chris Dugan – mixing
- Chris Allgood – mastering
- Emily Lazar – mastering
- The Lodge (New York, NY) – mastering location
- Jasper Graham – album package
- Dana Trippe – design, photography

== Charts ==
Chart performance for Freewheelin' Woman
Chart (2022)	Peak position
UK Album Downloads (OCC)	72
US Top Current Album Sales (Billboard)	89
