= Venus and Mars (2001 film) =

- German: Venus & Mars
- Directed by: Harry Mastrogeorge
- Screenplay by: Ben Taylor
- Produced by: Emmo Lempert; Henning Röhl
- Starring: Lynn Redgrave; Daniela Amavia; Ryan Hurst; Fay Masterson
- Cinematography: Martin Fuhrer
- Edited by: Darcy Worsham
- Music by: Nathan Barr
- Production companies: Atlantis Film; Mitteldeutsches Filmkontor
- Distributed by: Buena Vista International
- Release date: 15 March 2001 (Germany)
- Running time: 93 minutes
- Country: Germany

Venus and Mars (German: Venus & Mars) is a 2001 comedy directed by Harry Mastrogeorge featuring Lynn Redgrave, Daniela Amavia, and Ryan Hurst.

== Cast ==
- Daniela Amavia as Kay Vogel
- Lynn Redgrave as Emily Vogel
- Ryan Hurst as Roberto
- Fay Masterson as Celeste
- Julia Sawalha as Marie
- Julie Bowen as Lisa Kelly
- Michael Weatherly as Cody
- Hella von Sinnen as Bertha
