= Lost in America (2018 film) =

- Directed by: Rotimi Rainwater
- Written by: Rotimi Rainwater
- Produced by: Brent C. Johnson; Steven V. Vasquez Jr. Mike C. Manning; Rotimi Rainwater; Jorge L. Rivera; Brandon Bennett-Tritch (executive producer); Allan Camaisa (executive producer); Megan Camaisa (executive producer); Vinny Chhibber (executive producer)
- Starring: Rosario Dawson; Jewel; Tiffany Haddish; Halle Berry; Jon Bon Jovi; Sanaa Lathan; Rebecca Gayheart-Dane
- Cinematography: Steven V. Vasquez Jr.
- Edited by: James R. White; Sean Yates; Matt Alexander
- Music by: Tammy Hyler
- Production companies: Village Entertainment; Chhibber Mann Productions; Def Pictures
- Distributed by: Indican Pictures
- Release date: May 10, 2018 (Nashville Film Festival)
- Country: United States
- Language: English
- Box office: $11,301

Lost in America is a documentary feature film by director Rotimi Rainwater. The film aims to shine a light on the issue of homeless youth in the United States. It investigates the reasons youth become homeless, the challenges they face while on the streets and the possible ways to help them find homes and get off the street for good.

The film includes appearances by singers Jon Bon Jovi and Jewel, actors Halle Berry, Rosario Dawson and Mike C. Manning (who is also a producer on the film) and US Senator Patrick Leahy. The film was shown out of competition at the Bentonville Film Festival. Jewel also wrote a track for the film, "No More Tears", which was subsequently included on her 2022 album Freewheelin' Woman as a duet with Darius Rucker.

Lost in America is a continuation of Rotimi Rainwater's journey of shining the light on youth homelessness after directing the feature film Sugar.

== Synopsis ==
Lost in America follows the journey of formerly homeless director, Rotimi Rainwater, as he tries to accept and come to terms with his experience of being a homeless youth. He and his film crew travel the country interviewing homeless youth, organizations aimed to help them, and politicians to gain a better understanding of the issue of youth homelessness. The film looks at the challenges faced by homeless youth such as sex trafficking, the failure of the foster care system and the lack of acceptance of LGBTQ kids.

== Production ==
Lost in America began production in 2013. Funding for the film was raised via crowdfunding site Indiegogo.
