= Britain Simons =

American actor

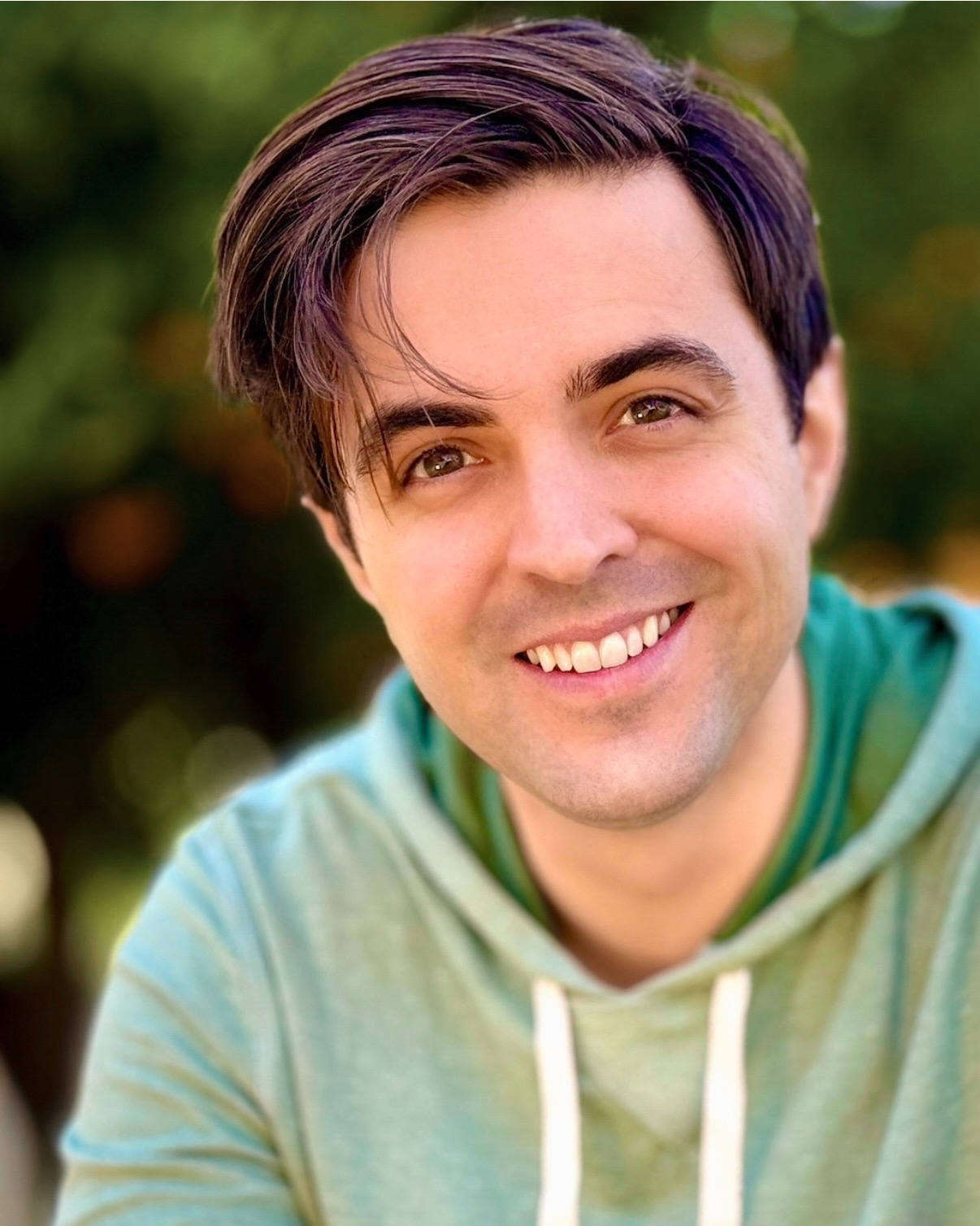
- Born: Britain David Simons; 1991 (age 34–35); Durango, Colorado, U.S.
- Education: Montrose High School; Baylor University
- Occupations: influencer; actor
- Years active: 2014-present
- Known for: Ultraman X: The Movie
- Notable work: Zeolite Detox, Tractor Supply Guy and the Social "The Science of Natural Remedies" series

Instagram information
- Page: Heal Now | 𝐁𝐫𝐢𝐭𝐚𝐢𝐧 𝐒𝐢𝐦𝐨𝐧𝐬
- Years active: 2012-present
- Genres: Health & Wellness
- Followers: 213 thousand

TikTok information
- Page: Heal Now | britainsimons
- Years active: 2020-present
- Genres: Health & Wellness
- Followers: 196.5 thousand (On 2.0 account - previously 323 thousand)

Britain Simons is an American actor and influencer. He has garnered over 400K followers on social media, mainly TikTok and Instagram. Also, known for his appearance on Disney's Descendants: School of Secrets appearing in 7 out of 23 episodes and having a minor part in the Lifetime original film Online Abduction (also known as Cyber Case), and playing the Badge Badger in the State Farm commercials. He began his professional career by doing commercials in 2014 in a local spot for Pappa Rollo's Pizza produced by Time Warner Cable while still attending university. He continued his career in Hollywood, California by starring in independent films such as Surgery, television appearances on Disney Channel, Lifetime Television and Investigation Discovery, and commercials for Honda, War Dragons App, Toyota, State Farm, and Walmart.

In 2016, Britain performed the leading voiceover role of Daichi in the American English language version of Tsuburaya Productions feature film Ultraman X The Movie, the special 50th Ultra Series Anniversary theatrical feature film of Ultraman X. In 2020, he appeared in the episode "Sing, Sing, Sing" on the series Penny Dreadful: City of Angels on Showtime (TV network).

== Early life and education ==
Simons was born In Durango, Colorado to Kelly Roelke, a photographer, and David Simons, a contractor and architect. He has one sibling, an older sister named Gentry Simons, who works in Ayurvedic medicine. His parents separated when he was four and relocated to Montrose, CO until he earned his high school diploma and moved away for college.

As a teen, Britain discovered community theatre and competitive speech team while preparing for a life as an engineer. He traveled to New York City, NY with the Carnegie Hall Singers, attended the National Youth Leadership Forum on National Security in Washington D.C., and earned his diploma from Montrose High School in 2010. He made the decision with his parents to pursue acting. From there, he received the Daniels Fund Scholarship to attend the university of his choice. He graduated with his Bachelor of Fine Arts degree in Theatre Studies from Baylor University, in Texas. He also attended the National Theater Institute at the Eugene O'Neill Theater Center in Waterford, Connecticut, NYC and he spent a short time in St. Petersburg, Russia with The St. Petersburg State Theater Arts Academy. After he moved to Hollywood he continued his training with John Kirby.

== Career ==
Simons has garnered a following of 196 thousand (previously 323+ thousand before an account ban) on TikTok 2.0 and 213+ thousand on Instagram. In early 2024, TikTok and other platforms began allegedly censoring traditional health and remedy information. According to sources, Britain used official U.S. Government scientific studies (PubMed, NIH, etc.) to teach about "The Science of Natural Remedies," but was banned on TikTok for his educational content. He has since committed to rebuilding his community.

After he completed his formal education at Baylor University, in 2014, he began building a career in film, television and commercials in Los Angeles, CA. His first commercial appearances included Walmart's national Dare to Compare campaign, a Honda/BuzzFeed collaboration advert on Snapchat, and an international commercial for Vivo's V3 smartphone. Soon to follow, he performed in the music video for Showtek - "90s by Nature" and a supporting role in Calum Scott's official music video for his release "Dancing on My Own".

Simons' television debut was in an appearance on the Lifetime Television movie Babysitter's Black Book with a single line as the food truck boy. Soon after he earned a supporting role in another Lifetime Television feature film Online Abduction (aka Cyber Case) (2015) alongside Brooke Butler, directed by Steven R. Monroe. He made appearances in shows like Murder Book (2015), Unusual Suspects (2015), and Disney's Descendants: School of Secrets (2015) playing Prince Ben, premiering online and the Disney Channel in support of the movie summer event, Descendants.

After less than two years in Hollywood, Britain began landing credited supporting roles in indie and major feature films. In 2016, he landed the supporting role of Handsome Boy in the critically acclaimed horror film, Holidays directed by Kevin Kolsch. He also performed the leading voice-over role of Daichi in the Ultraman 50th anniversary feature film Ultraman X The Movie.

Britain can also been seen in his comedic commercial spots for the War Dragons App, his most recent role of Peter Parker aka Spider-Man in the new unofficial web series Superheroes in Therapy, along with his commercial spots for State Farm where he plays the Badge Badger. In 2020, he played the role of "Assistant" to Jerome Townsend on the new Showtime (TV network) series, Penny Dreadful: City of Angels.

== Filmography ==
=== Commercials ===
Year	Title	Company	Notes
2014	Pappa Rollos Pizza	Time Warner	Regional Commercial
2015	Vivo V3 (smartphone)	Vivo	Asia Commercial
2015	Snapchat Honda	BuzzFeed/Honda	Social Media Ad
2017	Toyota Concept-愛i	Toyota Japan	Japan Commercial
2017	War Dragons	Glass & Marker	National Commercial
2017	Moto Z3	Motorola	National Commercial
2018	"Badge Badger"	State Farm	National Commercial
2018	"Valley Hi Toyota"	Toyota	Regional Christmas Commercial
2019	"Energy on the Go"	5-Hour Energy	National Commercial

=== Film ===
Year	Title	Role	Notes
2014	Babysitter's Black Book	Food truck boy	Lifetime Television
2015	Online Abduction (aka Cyber Case)	Ben	Lifetime Television
2016	Holidays	Handsome boy	XYZ Films
2017	Ultraman X The Movie	Daichi Ozora (Voice)	Tsuburaya Productions
2017	Hickok	The Kid	Status Media & Entertainment

=== Television ===
Year	Title	Role	Notes
2015	Descendants: School of Secrets	Prince Ben	Prequel Series to Descendants
2015	Murder Book	Tipster	Episode: "Still Waters"
2015	Unusual Suspects	Eric Weaver	Episode: "New Years Evil"
2017	Rejects: Origins	Markos	Episode: "Pilot"
2018	Superheroes in Therapy	Peter Parker aka Spider-Man	Season 1
2020	Penny Dreadful: City of Angels	Assistant	Episode: "Sing, Sing, Sing"
2024	That 90s Show	Coffee Shop Drummer	Episode "Two Princes" (Uncredited)

=== Music video ===
Year	Title	Role	Notes
2015	90s By Nature	Contestant Judge	Artist: Showtek
2016	Dancing on My Own	Awakened Lover	Artist: Calum Scott
2018	Alfie's Song	Dr. Clayton Hunt	Artist: Bleachers
