= Rotimi Rainwater =

American writer, director, and producer (born 1970)

- Born: Rotimi James Rainwater; November 29, 1970 (age 55); Banbury, England
- Occupations: Film director, writer, producer
- Notable work: Sugar; Lost in America
- Parent(s): James Rainwater; Margaret Rainwater

Rotimi James Rainwater (born November 29, 1970) is an American writer, director, and producer. He is best known for the film Sugar, and the documentary Lost in America, both of which focus on homeless youth.

== Personal life ==
Rainwater was born in Banbury, England the only child to James and Margaret Rainwater. He moved to Orlando, Florida at age 7 after his parents divorced where he spent his entire childhood. As he grew up he started writing, and acting in school plays in the 4th grade. He attended St. Andrews School High School in Boca Raton, Florida. In 1988 he went into the US Navy but was discharged after only a year when his mother was diagnosed with cancer. Rainwater then spent 9 months homeless on the streets of Orlando, FL while taking care of his mother who eventually died in 1993. He has two daughters, Bella & Sunshine Rainwater.

== Career ==
Rainwater started in the film business as a production assistant in films such as Passenger 57, My Girl, Problem Child and on television shows such as Superboy and Swamp Thing. After moving to Los Angeles he worked his way up to get his chance to direct caused based projects for the Truth.com Anti-Tobacco campaign, the Centers for Disease Control and Prevention's VERB campaign, and the American Civil Liberties Union's 10couples.org campaign. Rainwater started directing films in 2005 with SP!T, a documentary on slam poetry. The film starred Shihan Van Clief, Albert Daniels, Mollie Engelhart, and Ove Salcedo and featured interviews with Russell Simmons, Woody Harrelson, Rosario Dawson and poet Nikki Giovanni.

In 2010 Rainwater made his feature film debut with Sugar, which was based on his time spent on the streets. It starred Shenae Grimes as the title character Sugar, as well as Marshall Allman, Corbin Bleu, Will Peltz, Nastassja Kinski, and Wes Studi. The film was released in November 2013.

In 2013, Rainwater began work on a feature documentary, Lost in America, which premiered in the UK in October 2018.
