= Kinskey =

Kinskey is a surname. Notable people with the surname include:

- Leonid Kinskey (1903–1998), Russian-German-American actor
- Mary Aquinas Kinskey (1894–1985), American aviator

== See also ==
- Kinsey (disambiguation)
- Kinski (disambiguation)
- Kinský (surname)
