= Dark Satellites =

2022 film

- Theatrical release poster
- Directed by: Thomas Stuber
- Written by: Clemens Meyer; Thomas Stuber
- Produced by: Fabian Maubach; Jochen Laube; Sophie Cocco
- Starring: Martina Gedeck; Nastassja Kinski; Albrecht Schuch; Peter Kurth
- Cinematography: Peter Matjasko
- Edited by: Kaya Inan; Julia Kovalenko
- Music by: Kat Frankie
- Production companies: Sommerhaus Filmproduktion; Warner Bros. Film Productions Germany
- Distributed by: Warner Bros. Pictures
- Release date: 1 December 2022
- Running time: 120 minutes
- Country: Germany
- Language: German

Dark Satellites (German: Die stillen Trabanten) is a 2022 German drama film based on a collection of short stories by Clemens Meyer.

== Cast ==
- Martina Gedeck - Christa
- Nastassja Kinski - Birgitt
- Albrecht Schuch - Jens
- Peter Kurth - Hans
- Irina Starshenbaum - Marika
- Lilith Stangenberg - Aischa
- Adel Bencherif - Hamed
- Charly Hübner - Erik
