= Sonja Kinski =

American actress

- Occupations: Actress; model
- Years active: 2008–present (acting)
- Mother: Nastassja Kinski
- Relatives: Kenya Kinski-Jones (half-sister)

Sonja Kinski is an Egyptian-American model and actress.

== Early life ==
Kinski's parents are Nastassja Kinski and Egyptian filmmaker Ibrahim Moussa (producer, Intervista (1987)). Kinski also has a younger half-sister Kenya, born in 1993.

== Career ==
At the age of 14, Kinski appeared on the cover of the German edition of the Marie Claire magazine of March 2000. Then in the 2000s, on the covers of Marie Claire (February 2001, Germany), Photo (June 2003, France), Evening Standard (June 2006, United Kingdom), Jalouse (October 2006, France). In addition to advertisements in the press, she is regularly invited to participate in photo shoots for promotional events.

Kinski is affiliated to the Model Management agency. Her film career began in 2008. In the same year, she modeled for the character Zoey in the video game Left 4 Dead developed and published by Valve.

== Filmography ==
=== Cinema ===
Year	Title	Director	Character
2008	All God's Children Can Dance	Robert Logevall	Sandra
2010	Somewhere	Sofia Coppola	Party Girl (uncredited)
2013	Diamond on Vinyl	J.R. Hughto	Charlie
2014	Dark Hearts	Rudolf Buitendach	Fran
2015	A Beautiful Now	Daniela Amavia	Jessica
2015	The Wicked Within	Jay Alaimo	Maggie
2016	Holidays: Mother's Day	Sarah Adina Smith	Crystal
2016	She's Allergic to Cats	Michael Reich	Cora
2017	First House on the Hill	Matteo Saradini	Dorothy

=== Television ===
- 2010 : Pom Wonderful by François Girard : Eve
- 2012 : Longmire (TV series), season 1, episode 8 : Fiona Hines alias October
- 2017 : Chance (TV series), season 2, episodes 1–9 : Clara Santiago
