= Vivo V1 =

2015 smartphone manufactured by Vivo

- Brand: Vivo
- Manufacturer: Vivo Communication Technology Co
- Series: Vivo V1 Series
- First released: July 2015
- Availability by region: China
- Predecessor: None
- Successor: Vivo V3
- Compatible networks: GSM / HSPA / LTE
- Dimensions: 143.3x71x6.8 mm (5.64x2.80x0.27 in)
- Weight: 153 g (5.4 oz)
- Operating system: Funtouch OS 2.1 running on Android 5.0 (Lollipop)
- System-on-chip: Qualcomm Snapdragon 410 (28 nm)
- CPU: 4x1.2 GHz Cortex A-53; L0: 4 + 4KB; L1: 16 + 16KB; L2: 2048 + 2048KB
- GPU: 400MHz Adreno 306
- Memory: 2GB LPDDR3 Single-channel, 533MHz
- Storage: 16GB (9.43 user available)
- Removable storage: microSDXC (up to 128GB)
- Battery: Non-removable Li-Po, 2300 mAh
- Rear camera: Resolution: 12.98MP CMOS, 4160x3120 (4:3); Features: AutoFocus, LED flash, HDR, panorama; Video: 1080p, 30fps
- Front camera: 5MP
- Display: Size: 5.0 in, 68.9 cm^2 IPS LCD; Resolution: 720x1280, 294 ppi; Ratios: 16:9 aspect ratio, ~67.7% StB ratio
- Media: Audio: AAC, AAC+ / aacPlus / HE-AAC v1, AMR / AMR-NB / GSM-AMR, FLAC, MIDI, MP3, OGG, WMA, WAV; Video: 3GPP, AVI, MKV, MP4, WMV, Xvid
- Connectivity: WiFi 802.11 a/b/g/n, WiFi Direct, hotspot; Bluetooth: 4.0, A2DP, EDR; microUSB 2.0 USB On-The-Go
- Data inputs: Accelerometer; Proximity sensor; Magnetometer
- Model: V1
- SAR: 0.53 W/kg (head) 1.34 W/kg (body)
- Made in: China
- Other: Colors: White/Gold
- Website: https://www.vivo.com/in/products

The Vivo V1 is the first phone in Vivo's V Series of phones. It launched in July 2015. The phone launched at a price of ₹17,980 ($251.72).

== Reception ==
=== Design ===
The phone is of (mostly) unibody metal design, with the top and bottom of the phone's back panel being made of plastic and white in color. The front of the phone has 3 buttons, a physical home button flanked by a menu and back button (left and right respectively), which are backlit and capacitive. The volume rocker and power/lock buttons are on the right, the micro-SD and headphone jack are found at the top of the phone. There is a notification light at the top of the front of the phone.
