= Torrents of Spring (1989 film) =

- DVD release cover
- Directed by: Jerzy Skolimowski
- Screenplay by: Jerzy Skolimowski
- Story by: Ivan Turgenev
- Produced by: Mario Cotone
- Starring: Timothy Hutton; Nastassja Kinski; Valeria Golino; William Forsythe; Urbano Barberini
- Cinematography: Witold Sobocinski
- Edited by: Cesare D'Amico
- Music by: Stanley Myers
- Production companies: Erre Produzioni; Reteitalia; Les Films Ariane; Films A2
- Distributed by: Curzon Film Distributors (United Kingdom); BIM Distribuzione (Italy); Les Films Ariane (France)
- Release dates: May 1989 (Cannes Film Festival); 6 September 1989 (France); 17 November 1989 (Italy); 18 May 1990 (UK)
- Running time: 101 minutes
- Countries: United Kingdom; France; Italy
- Language: English
- Box office: $111,747

Torrents of Spring is a 1989 drama film written and directed by Jerzy Skolimowski and starring Timothy Hutton, Nastassja Kinski and Valeria Golino. It is based on the 1872 novel by Ivan Turgenev. It is a British, French, and Italian co-production. Set in 1840, the film follows a young Russian aristocrat, Dimitri Sanin, who is torn between the love of a beautiful German pastry-shop girl, Gemma Rosselli, and a Russian seductress, Princess Maria Nikolaevna. The film competed for the Golden Palm Award at the 1989 Cannes Film Festival.

== Cast ==
- Timothy Hutton as Dimitri Sanin
- Nastassja Kinski as Maria Nikolaevna Polozov
- Valeria Golino as Gemma Rosselli
- William Forsythe as Prince Ippolito Polozov
- Urbano Barberini as Baron Von Doenhof
- Francesca De Sapio as Mrs. Rosselli
- Jacques Herlin as Pantaleone
- Antonio Cantafora as Richter
- Krzysztof Janczar as Klueber (credited as Christopher Janczar)
- Christian Dottorini as Emilio
- Alexia Korda as Mrs. Stoltz
- Marinella Anaclerio as Luisa
- Pietro Bontempo as Man With Glasses
- Thierry Langerak as La luna
- Xavier Maly as Pulcinella

== Reception ==
The film grossed $111,747 upon its U.S. theatrical release.
