= Will Peltz =

American actor (born 1986)

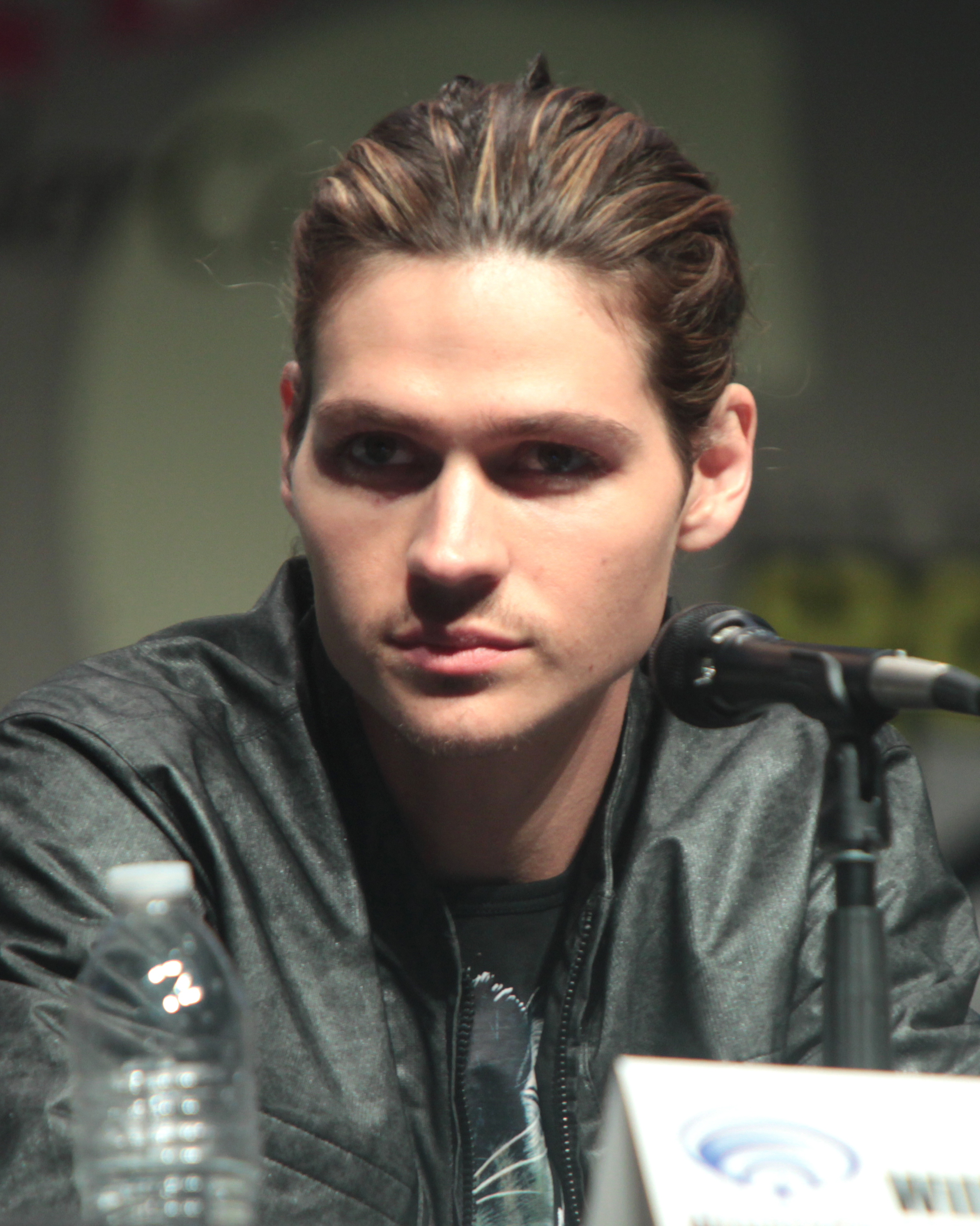
- Peltz in 2015
- Born: William Peltz; May 30, 1986 (age 40); New York City, U.S.
- Occupation: Actor
- Years active: 2010–present
- Spouse: Kenya Kinski-Jones (m. 2026)
- Father: Nelson Peltz
- Relatives: Nicola Peltz (sister)

William Peltz (born May 30, 1986) is an American actor, known for his roles in the supernatural horror film Unfriended (2014), the comedy-drama film Men, Women & Children (2014), and the supernatural drama television series Manifest (2021).

== Early life ==
Peltz was born in New York City, the son of Nelson Peltz, a billionaire businessman and model Claudia Heffner. Peltz's father is Jewish. Specifically of Austrian Jewish and Russian Jewish descent, while his mother has German, Welsh, and English ancestry. Peltz celebrated his bar mitzvah.

He has seven siblings, including actress Nicola Peltz, and two half-siblings from his father's previous marriages.

Peltz played ice hockey in his youth, advancing to Tier III Junior hockey with the Jersey Hitmen.

== Career ==
Peltz became interested in acting while reading scripts with his sister Nicola. In 2009, he moved to Los Angeles and secured his first roles in film productions.

In 2014, he had his first major role in Jason Reitman's drama film Men, Women & Children. That same year, he starred in the horror film Unfriended as Adam Sewell.

== Personal life ==
He and his sister actress Nicola Peltz have matching Hebrew tattoos on their ribs, that read: "family".

He has been in a relationship with American fashion model Kenya Kinski-Jones, daughter of American record producer Quincy Jones and German actress Nastassja Kinski, since 2011. The couple announced their engagement in July 2025. They were married on June 13, 2026 in Westchester County, New York.

== Filmography ==
=== Film ===
Year	Title	Role	Notes
2011	Abduction	Jake	as William Peltz
2011	In Time	Pierre	
2012	To Write Love on Her Arms	Sean	as William Peltz
2012	The Collection	Brian	as William Peltz
2013	Sugar	Free	as William Peltz
2013	As Cool as I Am	Tim	as William Peltz
2013	Paranoia	Morgan	as William Peltz
2014	Men, Women & Children	Brandon Lender	
2015	Unfriended	Adam Sewell	
2015	Miles Away	Jason	Short film
2015	Safelight	Jason	
2015	Occupy Alice	Dan Abrams	Short film
2017	The Outcasts	Colin Hackett	
2018	Sierra Burgess Is a Loser	Spence	
2018	Time Freak	Ryan	
2019	You Are Here	Richard	
2020	InstaFame	Kurt	
2021	13 Minutes	Luke	
2022	Exploited	Jacob	
2023	The Nana Project	Cody	
2023	Hunt Club	Jackson	
2023	The List	Avon	
2023	The Resurrection of Charles Manson	Lucas Williams	
2026	Conspiracy of Thieves		

=== Television ===
Year	Title	Role	Notes
2010	Medium	Nervous Young Man	Episode: "There Will Be Blood... Type A"
2010	Entourage	Amanda's Assistant	2 episodes
2015	CSI: Cyber	Meta / Justice	Episode: "Fire Code"
2016	The Deleted	Mason	Recurring role; 6 episodes
2019	Euphoria	Luke Kasten	Episode: "Shook Ones Pt. II"
2021	Manifest	Levi	3 episodes
2022	Welcome to Chippendales	Derek	Episode: "Velveeta"
2023	Mayans M.C.	Derek	2 episodes

=== Music videos ===
Year	Title	Role	Artist
2017	"Young Dumb & Broke"	Student	Khalid
