= Picking Up the Pieces (Jewel album) =

Studio album by Jewel
- Released: September 11, 2015
- Recorded: 2014
- Venue: The Standard (Nashville, Tennessee)
- Studio: Grand Victor Sound (Nashville, Tennessee)
- Genre: Country folk
- Length: 62:28
- Label: Sugar Hill
- Producer: Jewel

Jewel chronology
Let It Snow: A Holiday Collection (2013)	Picking Up the Pieces (2015)	Freewheelin' Woman (2022)

Singles from Picking Up the Pieces
- 1. "My Father's Daughter" Released: August 14, 2015

Picking Up the Pieces is the twelfth studio album from American singer-songwriter Jewel, released on September 11, 2015, through Sugar Hill Records. Self-produced, the album is said to be a bookend to her 1995 debut album, Pieces of You.

== Background and writing ==
The announcement for the album came on July 1, 2015, as part of Jewel's monthly "EDA INCLUSIVE" series on her website. In the same post she describes the writing process:

"My focus for this CD was to forget everything I have learned about the music business the last 20 years and get back to what my bones have to say about songs and words and feeling and meaning...It took real effort to clear my thoughts and have no rules and just create - going back to my folk/American roots that I began with."

The album features new material as well as songs Jewel has been playing live since the mid-nineties but never recorded. One of the new tracks, "My Father's Daughter," is a collaboration with Dolly Parton.

== Production ==
Jewel originally hired Paul Worley to produce the album, but he backed out about a week before rehearsals insisting that she produce it herself and suggesting she will thank him later for the idea.

Jewel wanted to capture a live sound for the album. Portions of it were recorded during a set at The Standard in Nashville, while others were captured during a live performance in front of friends at Grand Victor Sound, more commonly known as Nashville's historic RCA Studio A. Songs were recorded in one take, with "no overdubs, no layering tracks, no auto-tune or tricks," according to Jewel. She describes the overall sound as "minimal, focusing on the singing, lyric, and emotion."

Jeff Balding, who engineered Jewel's 2001 album This Way, is credited with engineering the full band songs on the album, while the acoustic tracks were engineered by Erik Hellerman. The entire album was mixed by Gary Paczosa.

== Release ==
The album's lead single, "My Father's Daughter," was "released" on August 14, 2015.

Picking Up the Pieces was released on September 11, 2015, through Sugar Hill Records.

== Critical reception ==
Professional ratings
Review scores
Source	Rating
AllMusic	3.5/5 stars
Renowned for Sound	4.5/5 stars

Picking Up the Pieces has received mostly positive reviews from music critics. AllMusic's Stephen Thomas Erlewine rated the album three and a half out of five stars and states: "her decision to return to the (Pieces of You) form but not the sensibility of her earlier music is what makes Picking Up the Pieces a successful neo-comeback." Marcus Floyd from Renowned for Sound rated the album four and a half out of five stars and claims: "Jewel’s voice hasn’t been heard this raw for 20 years, it shines throughout the entire album," and that "Jewel has successfully returned to her roots, and her fans will thank her for it."

== Track listing ==
Picking Up the Pieces — Standard edition
No.	Title	Writer(s)	Length
1.	"Love Used to Be"	Jewel Kilcher	5:41
2.	"A Boy Needs a Bike"	Kilcher	4:10
3.	"Everything Breaks"	Kilcher	4:01
4.	"Family Tree"	Kilcher, Lisa Carver	3:36
5.	"It Doesn't Hurt Right Now" (featuring Rodney Crowell)	Kilcher, Rodney Crowell	4:35
6.	"His Pleasure Is My Pain"	Kilcher	5:42
7.	"Here When Gone"	Kilcher	4:44
8.	"The Shape of You"	Kilcher, Dallas Davidson, David Murphy	4:15
9.	"Plain Jane"	Kilcher	3:49
10.	"Pretty Faced Fool"	Daniel Couch, Brett Cornelius, Kip Moore	3:51
11.	"Nicotine Love"	Kilcher	6:33
12.	"Carnivore"	Kilcher	4:20
13.	"My Father's Daughter" (featuring Dolly Parton)	Kilcher, Carver	3:25
14.	"Mercy"	Kilcher	3:46
Total length:			62:28

== Personnel ==
- Jewel – vocals, guitars
- Mike Rojas – keyboards
- Tim Lauer – harmonium (5), acoustic piano (10)
- Jimmy Wallace – pump organ (14)
- Dan Dugmore – electric guitars, acoustic guitars, pedal steel guitar, mandolin
- Rob McNelley – electric guitars
- Lisa Carver – acoustic guitar (4)
- Rodney Crowell – guitars (5), vocals (5)
- Steuart Smith – guitars (5)
- Luke Reynolds – acoustic guitar (7), electric guitar (7, 11)
- Biff Watson – acoustic guitar (10)
- Randy Kohrs – Weissenborn guitar (14)
- Russ Pahl – pedal steel guitar
- David LaBruyere – bass (1)
- Michael Rhodes – bass (2–14)
- Chad Cromwell – drums
- Eric Darken – drums, percussion
- David Henry – cello (5, 10)
- Jonathan Yudkin – harmonica (6), viola (6), bass (6, 11), string arrangements (6, 11), sitar (11), shruti box (11), percussion (11), cellos (11)
- Dolly Parton – vocals (13)

=== Production ===
- Jewel – producer
- Jeff Balding – recording (1–3, 5, 7, 10, 13, 14)
- Ken Halford – recording (6, 11)
- Gary Paczosa – additional engineer (1, 2, 7, 13, 14), recording (8, 9, 12), mixing
- Erik Hellerman – additional engineer (3, 7, 13), recording (4), Dolly Parton vocal recording (13)
- Joe Martino – additional engineer (3, 7, 10)
- Jonathan Yudkin – additional engineer (6, 11)
- Zack DeWall – recording assistant (1–3, 7, 10, 13)
- Leslie Richter – recording assistant (1–3, 7, 10, 13)
- Shani Gandhi – assistant engineer (1, 2, 7–9, 12–14), mix assistant
- Brett Lind – Dolly Parton vocal recording assistant (13)
- Paul Blakemore – mastering at CMG Mastering (Cleveland, Ohio)
- Clint Holley – mastering at Well Made Music (Bristol, Virginia)
- Carrie Smith – design
- Matthew Rolston – photography
- Virginia Davis – management

== Charts ==
Chart (2015)	Peak position
Australian Albums (ARIA)	75
Dutch Albums (Album Top 100)	61
US Billboard 200	28
US Digital Albums (Billboard)	22
US Americana/Folk Albums (Billboard)	1

== Release history ==
List of release dates, showing region, format(s), label and reference
Region	Date	Format(s)	Label	Ref.
United States	September 11, 2015	CD; digital download; vinyl	Sugar Hill	
