= Daniels Fund =

American charitable foundation

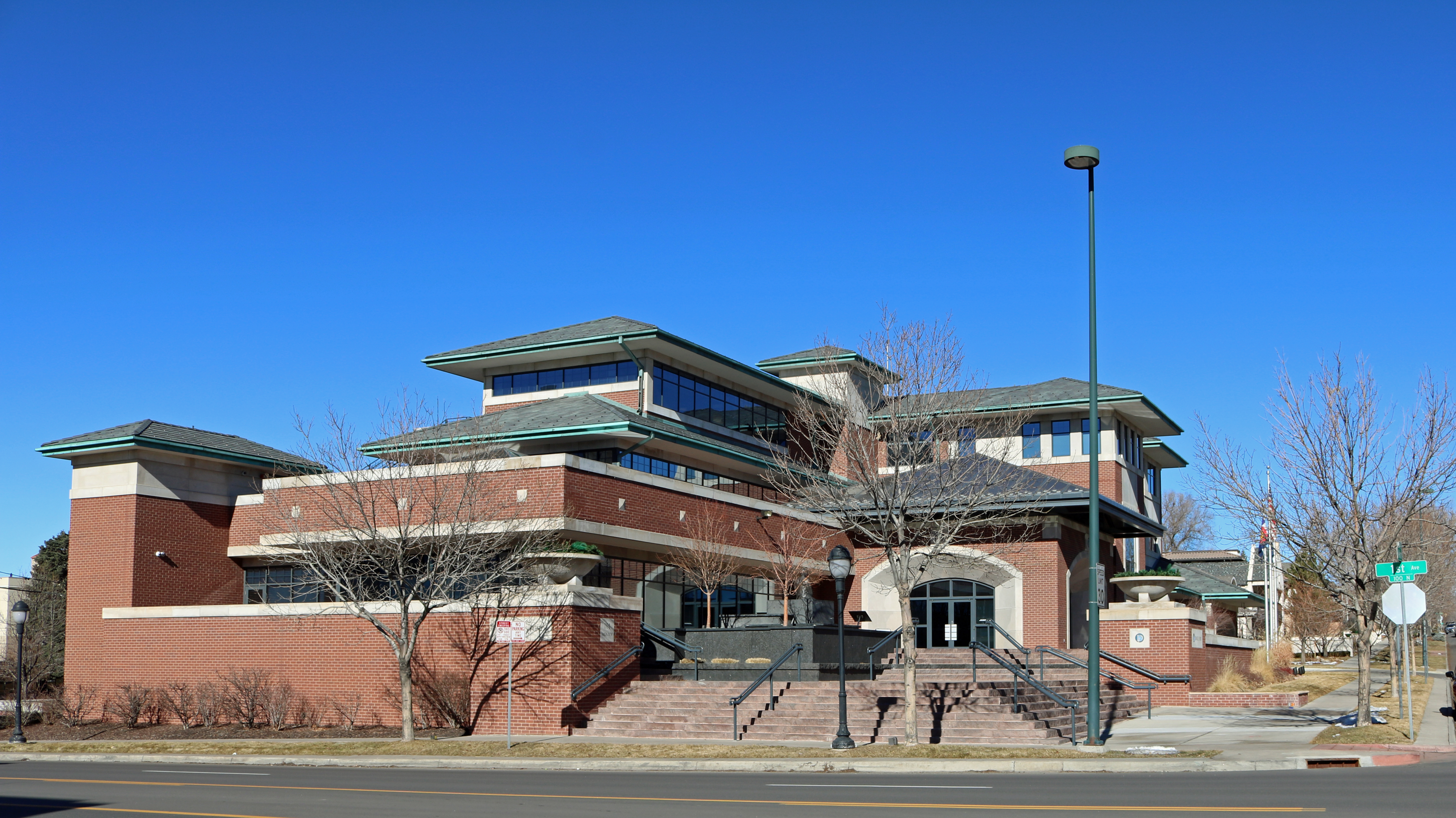
- Daniels Fund Headquarters in Denver.
- Company type: Private Foundation
- Industry: Foundation
- Founded: Denver, Colorado (2000)
- Headquarters: Denver, Colorado
- Key people: Hanna Skandera, President & CEO; John Suthers, Chairman; Bill Daniels, Founder
- Total assets: $1.6 billion (2022)
- Number of employees: 30 (2022)
- Website: www.danielsfund.org

The Daniels Fund is a private charitable foundation based in Denver, Colorado. It was founded by Bill Daniels, a decorated fighter pilot in World War II and the Korean War, who went on to become one of the early pioneers of the cable television industry.

Throughout his lifetime, Daniels gave generously to people in need and the organizations that serve them. Before his death in 2000, Daniels spent his final years carefully defining the specific funding areas he wished to support through his foundation, the geographic regions that would benefit from that support, and the percentage of funding allocated for each region.

Following Bill Daniels' direction, the Daniels Fund provides grants to nonprofit organizations, awards college scholarships through two distinct programs, and operates an ethics initiative to promote principle-based ethics. The Daniels Fund provides grants and scholarships in Colorado, New Mexico, Utah, and Wyoming, with limited funding directed to programs of national impact that fall within the foundation's charitable mission.

The Daniels Fund's assets were provided entirely by its founder, Bill Daniels, and the foundation does not seek or accept donations or take any form of public or private funding. The Daniels Fund was established to operate in perpetuity.

== Daniels Fund Grant Program ==
As decided by Mr. Daniels, each year, approximately 70% of charitable allocations are made through the Daniels Fund Grants Program in the funding areas that he defined for the foundation: Aging, Alcoholism & Substance Abuse, Amateur Sports, Disabilities, Early Childhood Education, Ethics & Integrity in Education, Homeless & Disadvantaged, K-12 Education Reform, and Youth Development.

== Daniels Fund Scholarship Program ==
Mr. Daniels directed that approximately 30% of charitable allocations be made through the Daniels Fund Scholarship Program, which consists of the Daniels Scholarship and the Boundless Opportunity Scholarship.

Daniels Scholarships give motivated high school seniors--with leadership, character, ethics, and a commitment to give back to their communities--the opportunity to obtain a four-year degree from the university of their choice.

Boundless Opportunity Scholarships support non-traditional students such as adult learners, GED recipients, former foster care youth, former juvenile justice youth, veterans, and students participating in ROTC on campus.

== Daniels Fund Ethics Initiative ==
Based on Bill Daniels commitment to ethics and integrity, the Daniels Fund Ethics Initiative was launched in 2010 with select business schools from universities in Colorado, New Mexico, Utah, and Wyoming.

The Daniels Fund Ethics Initiative delivers principle-based ethics education and reinforces the value of ethical business and personal conduct. Each of the Ethics Initiative's eight components utilizes a specific approach to reach its target audience. The Daniels Fund Ethics Initiative Collegiate Program consists of ten business schools and one law school from ten universities. More than 450,000 students, faculty, and businesspeople have been reached by the Collegiate Program.

== Cumulative Data as of December 2021 ==
- Grants and Scholarships Awarded: $1.003 billion
- Grants: $747.4 million
- Daniels Scholarships: $235.8 million
- Boundless Opportunity Scholarships: $19.9 million
- Total Scholarships: $255.7 million
- Scholars Named: 4,800

== Notable Daniels Fund Scholarship Recipients ==
• Britain Simons - 2010 Scholar

== Links ==
- Daniels Fund website
