= Kenya Kinski-Jones =

American fashion model (born 1993)

- Born: Kenya Julia Niambi Sarah Jones; February 9, 1993 (age 33); Los Angeles, California, U.S.
- Other name: Kenya Jones Peltz
- Education: Loyola Marymount University (BA)
- Spouse: Will Peltz (m. 2026)
- Parents: Quincy Jones; Nastassja Kinski
- Relatives: Quincy Jones III (half-brother); Rashida Jones (half-sister); Kidada Jones (half-sister); Sonja Kinski (half-sister); Richard A. Jones (uncle); Klaus Kinski (grandfather); Nikolai Kinski (uncle); Pola Kinski (aunt)
- Modeling information
- Height: 5 ft 8.5 in (1.74 m)
- Hair color: Blonde (naturally brown)
- Eye color: Brown
- Agency: Merci Management (Sydney); Two Management (Berlin, Copenhagen, Los Angeles)

Kenya Julia Niambi Sarah Jones Peltz (née Jones) (born February 9, 1993), known professionally as Kenya Kinski-Jones, is an American fashion model. She is the daughter of American record producer Quincy Jones and German actress Nastassja Kinski.

== Early life and education ==
Jones was born in Los Angeles to American musician Quincy Jones and German actress Nastassja Kinski (née Nakszynski). She has two maternal half-siblings and 6 paternal half-siblings including actresses Rashida and Kidada Jones, and producer Quincy Jones III. Jones has been a vegetarian since she was 8 years old. In 2015, she graduated from Loyola Marymount University with a degree in journalism.

== Career ==
Jones was discovered by fashion photographer Bruce Weber, who shot her first modeling job for Vogue España. She started her career at Ford Models. Her first runway show was for Chanel. She has appeared in campaigns for Calvin Klein, Stella McCartney, Nasty Gal, and Ermanno Scervino. She was in editorials for Vogue, Harper's Bazaar, Nylon, Teen Vogue, V, Glamour, and L'Officiel.

== Personal life ==
Since 2011, Jones has been in a relationship with American actor Will Peltz, a son of businessman Nelson Peltz. In July 2025, the couple announced their engagement. They were married on June 13, 2026 in Westchester County, New York.
