= .com for Murder =

2001 horror science fiction thriller film directed by Nico Mastorakis

- DVD cover from the film.
- Directed by: Nico Mastorakis
- Written by: Nico Mastorakis; Phil Marr
- Produced by: Nico Mastorakis
- Starring: Nastassja Kinski; Nicollette Sheridan; Roger Daltrey; Huey Lewis
- Cinematography: Andreas Bellis
- Edited by: George Rosenberg
- Music by: Ross Levinson
- Production company: Omega Entertainment
- Distributed by: Metro-Goldwyn-Mayer
- Release date: October 29, 2001 (MIFED Film Market)
- Running time: 96 minutes
- Country: United States
- Language: English
- Budget: $11 million

.com for Murder is a 2001 American science fiction horror/crime-drama film written by Nico Mastorakis and Phill Marr and directed by Mastorakis, starring Nastassja Kinski, Nicollette Sheridan, Roger Daltrey, and Huey Lewis.

== Plot ==
Ben is a successful and rich architect, living in Los Angeles. Sondra is his beloved wife, who broke a leg while skiing. As Ben is leaving town for his work, Sondra accesses his intelligent house computer Hal, and discovers that Ben has been chatting on "American Love Online". Posing as him, she chats with one of his online friends, Lynn, and they agree to meet that night. Hacker Werther rudely joins the conversation and later shuts out Sondra, and starts chatting in Ben's name. Sondra is meanwhile joined by her sister Misty, who comes to look after her. Later that night Werther kills Lynn in her house, showing an online live feed of the murder to Sondra and Misty. Werther is shown to be a psychopath who loves to quote from The Sorrows of Young Werther by Goethe and calls his victims by the name Lotte (the object of the affection of Werther in that novel).

Sondra and Misty call the police and eventually speak with FBI agent Matheson. When they send him the file of the murder, it appears to be encrypted. On the advice of agent Matheson, Sondra and Misty invite a computer expert to decrypt the file. As the expert arrives at the door, Werther calls them, pretending to be the expert. Sondra and Misty thus send the real expert away, believing he is the killer. A short while later, Werther shows up at the house, keeping his disguise. After he finishes the decrypting job and leaves the house, Misty walks after him to inform him that the gate is jammed. Werther suddenly turns towards her and cuts her left wrist slightly, just enough to keep her living for another 20 minutes, all the while viewed by Sondra from the computer. Werther then turns to enter the house and kill Sondra, but Sondra manages to lock the main entrance in time to prevent this. Werther then tries to open the pool door but is electrocuted with 22,000 volts by Hal.

Sondra bandages Misty's wrist and tries to restore power to the house. Werther turns out not to be dead and in the meantime takes Misty. Carrying a passive night vision device that amplifies light 60,000 times, he is stunned by a lightning flash and falls off the second floor, coming to his death. Agent Matheson, his assistant agent Williams, and the police finally arrive at the scene, after electronic disinformation by Werther had previously sent them to the other end of town.

== Cast ==
- Nastassja Kinski as Sondra Brummel
- Nicollette Sheridan as Misty Brummel
- Roger Daltrey as Ben
- Huey Lewis as FBI agent Matheson
- Jeffery Dean as Werther
- Kim Valentine as Lynn
- Melinda Clarke as Michelle Williams

== Production ==
The film was shot in 2001 director Nico Mastorakis's native Greece. The budget was reported to be $11 million.

== Release ==
After being screened at various film festivals between 2001 and 2002, it was released on DVD on January 14, 2003. In February 2023, Arrow Films released it for the first time on Blu-ray, and distributed by Metro-Goldwyn-Mayer.

== Reception ==
Felix Vasquez Jr. of Cinema Crazed deemed it a "terrible remake of Rear Window", full of clichés and illogical. He said that Sheridan's and Daltrey's talent was lost through mis-casting and disliked Mastorakis' unrealistic portrayal of computers.

Joshua Errett of Now panned the film, writing: "An all-star cast of Huey Lewis, Roger Daltrey, Nicollette Sheridan and Nastassja Kinski is wasted in this completely unwatchable date-site sexual thriller."
