= Holidays (2016 film) =

2016 American anthology film

- Theatrical release poster
- Directed by: Kevin Smith; Gary Shore; Scott Stewart; Nicholas McCarthy; Dennis Widmyer; Kevin Kolsch; Sarah Adina Smith; Anthony Scott Burns; Adam Egypt Mortimer
- Produced by: John Hegeman; Tim Connors; Adam Egypt Mortimer; Kyle Franke; Aram Tertzakian
- Starring: Valentine's Day: Madeleine Coghlan; Savannah Kennick; Rick Peters; Britain Simons; St. Patrick's Day: Ruth Bradley; Peter Campion; Isolt McCaffrey; Easter: Ava Acres; Petra Wright; Mark Steger; Mother's Day: Sophie Traub; Aleksa Palladino; Sheila Vand; Jennifer Lafleur; Sonja Kinski; Father's Day: Jocelin Donahue; Michael Gross; Jana Karan; Halloween: Ashley Greene; Olivia Roush; Harley Quinn Smith; Harley Morenstein; Shelby Kemper; Christmas: Seth Green; Clare Grant; Kalos Cluff; John C. Johnson; Shawn Parsons; Michael Sun Lee; Wes Robertson; Karina Noelle; Scott Stewart; Richard DiLorenzo; New Year's Eve: Lorenza Izzo; Andrew Bowen; Megan Duffy
- Music by: Robert Allaire; Mark Degli Antoni; Christopher Drake; Ronen Landa; Leo Pearson; Pilotpriest; Jonathan Snipes; Mister Squinter
- Production companies: Distant Corners Entertainment; XYZ Films
- Distributed by: Vertical Entertainment
- Release dates: April 14, 2016 (TFF); April 22, 2016 (United States)
- Running time: 105 minutes
- Country: United States
- Language: English

Holidays is a 2016 American horror anthology film of short horror films, each inspired by a different celebration. The directors include Kevin Smith, Gary Shore, Adam Egypt Mortimer, Scott Stewart, Nicholas McCarthy, Kevin Kölsch and Dennis Widmyer, Sarah Adina Smith, and Anthony Scott Burns.

The film had its world premiere at the Tribeca Film Festival on April 14, 2016. It was then released on video on demand on April 15, 2016, prior to a limited release on April 22, 2016, by Vertical Entertainment.

== Segments ==
=== Valentine's Day ===
- Written and directed by Kevin Kölsch and Dennis Widmyer
- Starring Madeleine Coghlan, Savannah Kennick, Rick Peters, Britain Simons

Socially awkward, depressed high school student Maxine is picked on in gym class by cruel, popular student Heidi and her friends. Heidi pushes Maxine off the diving board; the latter nearly drowns, but Coach Rockwell, whom she has a crush on, rescues her. Rockwell is suffering from a heart condition and needs a transplant. Though he sympathizes with Maxine, he is reluctant to discipline Heidi for her bullying, as Heidi is the one organizing a fundraiser for his treatment.

Rockwell leaves a Valentine's Day card in Maxine's locker to console her. Maxine finds it and becomes euphoric. She then follows Heidi to a creek, where she kills Heidi with a box cutter and removes her heart. As Rockwell prepares to go on a date with his wife that evening, Maxine arrives at his house, offering Heidi's heart to him.

=== St. Patrick's Day ===
- Written and directed by Gary Shore
- Starring Ruth Bradley, Peter Campion, Isolt McCaffrey

School teacher Elizabeth Cullen shows her students a documentary film about St. Patrick's Day and the legend of how St. Patrick rid Ireland of snakes. She takes an interest in a student named Grainne, who, as a St. Patrick's card project, leaves a note reading "Only your deepest wish can make me smile" and a dried grass snake.

After a night of drinking, Elizabeth awakens in her car with a snakeskin surrounding her. In a supermarket, she encounters Grainne, who embraces her belly. Elizabeth later happily discovers that she is pregnant, only to learn from the doctor that the baby will be a snake. Elizabeth finds a drawing Grainne did of her giving birth to a snake and vomits black sludge. Throughout the course of her pregnancy, her behavior becomes increasingly strange.

Later, a heavily pregnant Elizabeth lies in her bathtub and places a mouse on her belly to lure the snake out. The snake violently thrashes inside of her, rendering her unconscious. She is then led away by Grainne and a mysterious man, presumably Grainne's father and the father of Elizabeth's snake baby. The man assumes that Elizabeth will be horrified, but she happily embraces her role as the snake's mother and joins the cult.

Later, a new teacher at the school gets the same message from Grainne.

=== Easter ===
- Written and directed by Nicholas McCarthy
- Starring Ava Acres, Petra Wright, Mark Steger

While being tucked into bed on the night before Easter, a little girl becomes frightened at the prospect of the Easter Bunny arriving. Her mother attempts to calm her by explaining the holiday mascot's connection to Jesus. She also tells her she has to be asleep when the Easter Bunny comes, as no child has ever seen him.

In the middle of the night, the girl goes to the kitchen to get water and discovers a rabbit-like creature wearing a crown of thorns, leaving chicks and candies in the living room. She attempts to sneak back to her room but is caught. The bunny tells her that now that she has seen him, she must assume his role as the Easter Bunny and will never see her mother again. He feeds her an egg that transforms her into a rabbit creature like himself.

The mother is heard calling for her daughter as the back door locks itself.

=== Mother's Day ===
- Written and directed by Sarah Adina Smith
- Starring Sophie Traub, Aleksa Palladino, Sheila Vand, Jennifer Lafleur, Sonja Kinski

A woman named Kate continually falls pregnant and receives abortions. Advised by her doctor, she attends a getaway out in the middle of the desert with other women and one man. The group becomes involved in an orgy, after which the getaway is revealed to be home to barren witches who are hoping to get pregnant. They tell Kate that she is the gateway. They constrain her, and groom and care for her while cutting her off from contacting the outside. It turns out that the doctor who recommended the getaway is also part of the coven.

Kate manages to flee, but suddenly goes into labor. The witches surround her to aid in her birth. However, they all scream in terror when she gives birth to a bloody full-sized arm.

=== Father's Day ===
- Written and directed by Anthony Scott Burns
- Starring Jocelin Donahue, Michael Gross, Jana Karan

Coming home from work, Carol receives a mysterious package from her father, whom she has not seen since her childhood. The package is an old cassette deck player with a tape inside. She plays the tape, in which her father tells her he loves her and instructs her to go to the place they played at when she was a child so they can be reunited. Carol calls her mother and berates her for lying to her about her father's death.

Upon reaching the destination as instructed, Carol realizes that the tape was recorded when she was a child. Following instructions from the tape, she eventually reaches a building with a mysterious door which she remembers entering with her father, where he asked the woman at the reception to take care of her before leaving her. In the tape, her father apologizes for leaving her, but claims he has to because he only has one chance to meet "him".

Carol enters the door and seems to enter another world. Meanwhile, Carol's mother frantically calls her cell phone, which Carol had left in her car.

Carol comes across a figure sitting in a chair. The voice in the tape states that he is glad she came "by her own free will". After Caroll calls out for her father, she is confronted by a dark, mysterious humanoid that roars at her. The tape recorder and headphones fall to the ground, and Carol subsequently disappears as the end of the tape continues saying "together".

=== Halloween ===
- Written and directed by Kevin Smith
- Starring Ashley Greene, Olivia Roush, Harley Quinn Smith, Harley Morenstein, Shelby Kemper.

Ian hosts an internet sex service and abuses his employees Holly, Bree, and Serena. When he denies the girls' wishes to celebrate Halloween, they attempt to push back against him. Unintimidated, he attempts to rape Serena, but the girls knock him out. Ian awakens in his underwear with a vibrator connected to a car battery superglued up his anus and a laptop placed in front of him. The girls send him demands through the laptop, warning him that he will be subjected to the vibrator if he does not fulfill them. They slide a knife under the door and command him to cut open his penis to turn it into a vagina. After he complies, the girls turn up the battery to full power, presumably killing him. The girls then answer the door to Nancy, whom Ian had called earlier about the job. They tell her that they are under new management and that Ian is no longer with the company due to "cutbacks".

=== Christmas ===
- Written and directed by Scott Stewart
- Starring Seth Green, Clare Grant, Kalos Cluff, John C. Johnson, Shawn Parsons, Michael Sun Lee, Wes Robertson, Karina Noelle, Scott Stewart, Richard DiLorenzo

Pete Gunderson is late trying to buy virtual glasses called "uVu" for his son. A man before him buys the last remaining stock despite Pete calling about it earlier, but the man suddenly has a heart attack and cannot reach his pills. At first, Pete starts to call for help, but after being reminded about his wife's demand to get the glasses, Pete instead steals the glasses and rushes home, where his wife complains about not receiving a Christmas bonus she was promised. On Christmas day, Pete's son Bobby is overjoyed, explaining that the glasses recreate your thoughts and ideas into a virtual game. On the urging of his son, Pete tries them on and sees a stripper. Later that night, Pete sneaks out of bed to try the glasses on again. At first, he sees himself receiving a blowjob from a prostitute, but after some static, the visuals suddenly switch to Pete stealing the glasses, seen from the dying man's point of view. Pete tries to hide what happened, but his wife, Sara, reveals that she saw the saved footage. Pete admits that he did it because the man "had what [he] wanted," and because he "was tired of being nice." To his surprise, Sara is turned on by this and the two have sex. Later, Pete looks through the glasses again and discovers that Sara had tortured and killed her boss after he passed her over for a bonus. Shocked, he reads the glasses' tagline: "uVu shows you YOU!"

=== New Year's Eve ===
- Written by Kevin Kölsch and Dennis Widmyer; directed by Adam Egypt Mortimer
- Starring Lorenza Izzo, Andrew Bowen, Megan Duffy

Reggie is a serial killer who targets women. After murdering his latest victim, Reggie picks up another girl, Jean, through a dating site and goes to meet with her for New Year's Eve. Their date is awkward, especially because of Reggie's weirdness, but Jean, feeling sorry for him, invites him to her apartment. They return to Jean's apartment and Reggie goes to the bathroom to wash up, though he is actually preparing to use chloroform on her. He checks the medicine cabinets and discovers that Jean keeps severed limbs and organs in jars, revealing her to be also a serial killer. Suddenly, Jean rushes in with a fire axe and attacks Reggie, who finds more corpses in her bathtub. Reggie attempts to make it to the living room and has his foot severed by the axe. After making it to his jacket, he pulls out a revolver but forgot to load it (he forgot to load the gun the first time he tried to shoot his earlier victim), resulting in Jean splitting his head open and killing him. As the New Year rings in, Jean dances with her axe.

== Production ==
The project originated with John Hegeman and his Distant Corners Entertainment. Tim Connors and Adam Egypt Mortimer were also producing, as well as Kyle Franke and Aram Tertzakian from XYZ Films. Executive producers were Andrew Barrer and Gabe Ferrari, and Nate Bolotin and Nick Spicer of XYZ.

== Release ==
The film had its world premiere at the Tribeca Film Festival on April 14, 2016. Prior to, Vertical Entertainment and XYZ Films acquired worldwide distribution rights. The film was released on April 15, 2016, through video on demand prior to a limited release on April 22, 2016.

== Reception ==
On the review aggregator Rotten Tomatoes, the film has an approval rating of 50%, based on 30 reviews, with a rating average of 5.90/10.

On Metacritic, the film has a similar 50% approval rate based on 8 critic reviews, and received 4.3/10 based on 19 user ratings.
