= A Beautiful Now =

- Film poster
- Directed by: Daniela Amavia
- Screenplay by: Daniela Amavia
- Produced by: Daniela Amavia; Keith Kjarval; Lynn Kressel
- Starring: Abigail Spencer
- Cinematography: Patrick Scola
- Edited by: Adam H Mack; Valdís Óskarsdóttir
- Music by: Johnny Jewel
- Production company: Unified Pictures
- Distributed by: Monterey Media
- Release date: June 12, 2015 (Los Angeles)
- Running time: 90 minutes
- Country: United States
- Language: English

A Beautiful Now is a 2015 American comedy-drama film written and directed by Daniela Amavia and starring Abigail Spencer. It is Amavia's directorial debut.

== Plot summary ==
A beautiful dancer balances on the razor's edge between reality and fantasy as she asks her friends to help her figure out the passions and relationship that have shaped who they are and who they will become.

== Cast ==
- Abigail Spencer as Romy
  - Hana Hayes as Young Romy
- Cheyenne Jackson as David
- Collette Wolfe as Ella
- Elena Satine as Jaki
- Sonja Kinski as Jessica
- Patrick Heusinger as Aaron
- Guy Burnet as Steve
- John Patrick Amedori as Chris
- Deborah Geffner as David's mother
- Ali Cobrin as Tracey
- Assaf Cohen as Ali
- Bobby Slayton as Mr. Rich
- Jordan Black as Cody
- Victor Turpin as Ricardo

== Reception ==
Keith Watson of Slant Magazine awarded the film one and a half stars out of four.
