= Kinský (surname) =

Kinský is a Czech–Slovak surname, most commonly referring to the Kinsky noble family. Its feminine form is Kinská. Notable people with the surname include:

- Antonín Kinský (born 1975), Czech footballer
- Antonín Kinský (born 2003), Czech footballer
- Jindřich Kinský (1927–2008), Czech basketball player
- Klaudia Kinská (born 1978), Slovak gymnast
- Vilém Kinský (1574–1634), Czech count and statesman

== See also ==
- Kinskey
- Kinski (disambiguation)
