= Nikolai Kinski =

French-American film actor (born 1976)

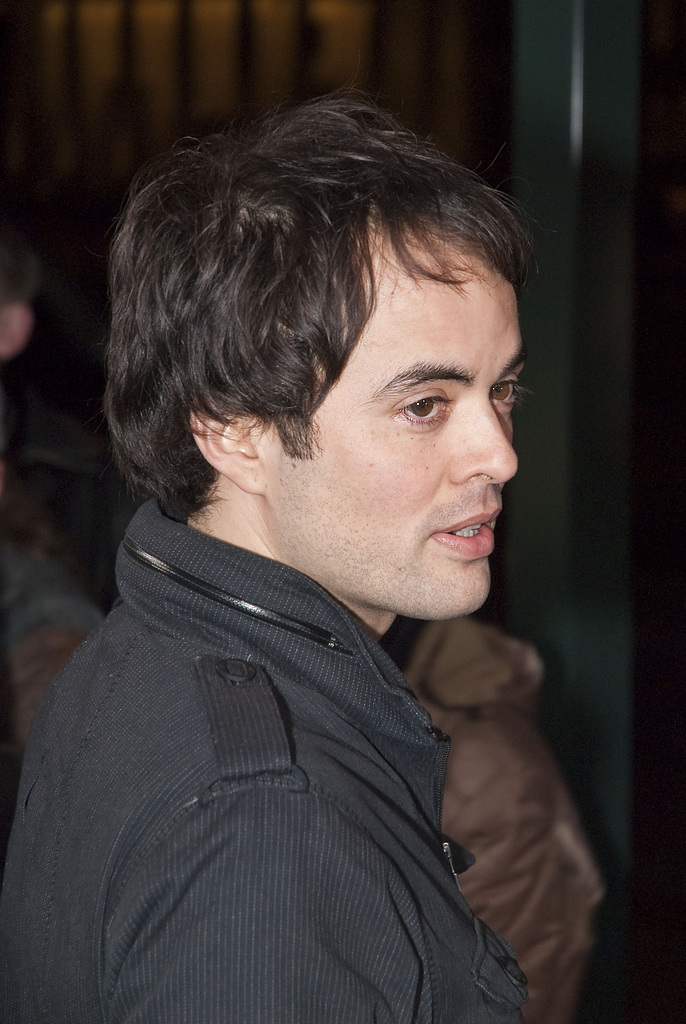
- Kinski in 2008
- Born: Nanhoï Nikolai Kinski; July 30, 1976 (age 49); Paris, France
- Occupation: Actor
- Father: Klaus Kinski
- Relatives: Nastassja Kinski (half-sister); Pola Kinski (half-sister); Kenya Kinski-Jones (niece)
- Website: nikolaikinski.de

Nanhoï Nikolai Kinski (born July 30, 1976) is a French-American film actor, who has also done work in television and on stage. He was born in Paris, and grew up in California. Currently residing in Berlin, he has acted primarily in American and German films, and speaks English, German, and French. He is a citizen of both France and the U.S.

He is the only son of German actor Klaus Kinski and his third wife, Minhoi Geneviève Loanic. He is the half-brother of actresses Pola Kinski and Nastassja Kinski, and through Nastassja, the uncle of model Kenya Kinski-Jones.

== Early life and education ==
Kinski was born in 1976 in Paris, to German actor Klaus Kinski, and his third wife, Minhoi Geneviève Loanic, a model of 19 when they met, who was born in Vietnam and came with her family to France at the age of seven. His father had two older daughters, Pola Kinski in 1952 and Nastassja Kinski in 1961, born in Germany to his first and second wives, respectively. He took his family to California, where Nikolai lived mostly with his mother after his parents divorced in 1979. He was never close to his half-sisters, who lived most of the time in Germany.

== Acting career ==
Kinski's father encouraged his interest in acting. His first role was at the age of 13 alongside his father in the film Kinski Paganini (1989). In the mid-1990s, he entered the UCLA School of Theatre as a theatre major and graduated from there.

Afterward Kinski moved to Berlin, where he learned to speak German fluently. He has since starred in a number of German language films and TV series, in addition to American works. He starred in Æon Flux (2005) alongside Charlize Theron.

In 2006, Kinski won the Romy Award as best newcomer.

== Filmography ==
Year	Title	Role	Director	Notes
1989	Paganini	Achille Paganini	Klaus Kinski	
1994	Jamila	Young Seit	Monica Teuber	
2000	West Coast		Joshua Davis	
2000	Recessions	The Man	Robbie Stauder	Short
2001	Tortilla Soup	Andy	Maria Ripoll	
2002	Never Get Outta the Boat	Saturn	Paul Quinn	
2002	The Devil Who Called Himself God	Lukas	Dmitriy Astrakhan	
2003	Dirty Sky	Paule	Andy Bausch	
2003	Connecting Dots	Alex	Alon Aranya	
2004	Untreu	Milan Farkas	Rainer Matsutani	TV film
2005	Æon Flux	Claudius	Karyn Kusama	
2005	Under the Dark Sun of Africa	Duncan Coburn	Roland Suso Richter	TV film
2005	Tatort	Martin Schneider	Robert Sigl	TV series (1 episode); Romy Gala - Favorite Male Shooting Star
2006	Klimt	Egon Schiele	Raúl Ruiz	Nominated - Undine Awards - Best Young Character Actor/ Actress
2006	Grimm Love	Otto Hauser	Martin Weisz	
2006	Fay Grim	Amin	Hal Hartley	
2006	Lemniskate	Him	Anna Bederke	Short
2006	Nichts geht mehr	Marc	Andreas Schaap	Short
2007	Giganten	Aimé Bonpland	Gero von Boehm	TV series (1 episode)
2008	The Secret Adventures of the Projectionist	The Projectionist	Max Sacker	Short
2009	Die zwei Leben des Daniel Shore	Daniel Shore	Michael Dreher	
2009	The Countess	The Teacher	Julie Delpy	
2009	Krupp: A Family Between War and Peace	Arndt von Bohlen	Carlo Rola	TV miniseries
2009	SOKO Donau	Sebastian Opitz	Robert Sigl (2)	TV series (1 episode)
2010	The Apologies	The Man	Hal Hartley (2)	Short
2010	Planet	The Man	Matthew Branning & Bjoern Ruehmann	Short
2010	Kalter Hund	Simon	Anna Porzelt	Short
2011	Long Distance Call	The Rezeptionist	Grzegorz Muskala	Short
2011	The Sinking of the Laconia	Walter Drexler	Uwe Janson	TV miniseries
2011	Stuttgart Homicide	Björn Kowald	Rainer Matsutani (2)	TV series (1 episode)
2012	Belle de Lyon	Marcel	Max Sacker (2)	Short
2012	Mary of Nazareth	Judas	Giacomo Campiotti	TV film
2012	Stolberg	Benjamin Becker	Andi Niessner	TV series (1 episode)
2013	Alex	Alex	Florian Frerichs	Short
2013	Die Frau hinter der Wand	Junger Makler	Grzegorz Muskala (2)	TV film
2013	Einsatz in Hamburg	Erster Offizier Barlog	Carlo Rola (2)	TV series (1 episode)
2014	Yves Saint Laurent	Karl Lagerfeld	Jalil Lespert	
2014	Posthumous	Kaleb Moo	Lulu Wang	
2014	Die Innere Zone	Dr. Antonius Cappa	Fosco Dubini	
2014	Neben der Spur - Adrenalin	Robert Mohren	Cyrill Boss & Philipp Stennert	TV film
2014	Iron Fist	Kaiser Karl	Carlo Rola (3)	TV film
2014	Küstenwache	Dolf Karst	Dagmar von Chappuis	TV series (1 episode)
2014	Binny und der Geist	Magnus Mala	Nico Zingelmann	TV series (1 episode)
2015	1915	Tony	Garin Hovannisian & Alec Mouhibian	
2015	Point Break	Pascal Al-Fariq	Ericson Core	
2015	After the Fall	René Valmund	Carlo Rola (4)	TV miniseries
2016	Axolotl Blockbuster	Mr. Kroschinske	Helene Hegemann	
2016	The Loner	Sepehr	Daniel Grove	
2017	The Yellow Birds	The Priest	Alexandre Moors	
2018	Berlin I Love You	Alister	Gabriela Tscherniak	
2019	Berlin Station	Roman Platov	various	TV series (recurring, season 3)
2020	Barbarians	Pelagios	various	TV series (recurring, season 1)
2022	Vikings: Valhalla	Romanos III Argyros		TV series (recurring, season 2)
2024	Masters of the Air	Col. Harold Huglin	Cary Joji Fukunaga	TV mini-series (season 1)
2024	Traumnovelle	Jacob	Florian Frerichs	
