= Pola Kinski =

German actress (born 1952)

- Born: Pola Nakszynski; 23 March 1952 (age 74); West Berlin, West Germany
- Occupation: Actress
- Spouse: Wolfgang Hoepner
- Children: 3
- Parent(s): Klaus Kinski; Gislinde Kühbeck
- Relatives: Nastassja Kinski (half-sister); Nikolai Kinski (half-brother); Kenya Kinski-Jones (niece)

Pola Kinski (born Pola Nakszynski; 23 March 1952) is a German actress. She is the firstborn daughter of the German actor Klaus Kinski.

== Early life ==
Under the name Pola Nakszynski, Pola Kinski was born in West Berlin as the only daughter of German actor Klaus Kinski and his first wife, the singer Gislinde Kühlbeck. After her father changed his surname to Kinski, it was changed for his children as well.

Her parents divorced in 1955 when she was three years old. Kinski was brought up by her mother and grandfather in Munich and saw her father only on an irregular basis. As soon as he became a famous actor, he would order his daughter to visit him in Berlin and later in Rome, as well as on film sets. He alternated between fits of rage and showering her with money and extravagant presents.

Her mother remarried and had a second child with her husband Herbert Kuhlbeck. Her father remarried twice and had a child with each of his wives. Kinski is the half-sister of the German actress Nastassja Kinski (born 1961) and the French-American actor Nikolai Kinski (born 1976). The half-siblings spent little time together while growing up.

== Autobiography ==
In 2013, 20 years after her father's death, Kinski released an autobiography, The Mouth of a Child, 2013 (German: Kindermund). The book's title refers to the original title of her father's memoirs All I Need Is Love (German: Ich bin so wild nach deinem Erdbeermund, literally I am so wild about your strawberry mouth), first published in 1975.

In The Mouth of a Child, she describes being sexually assaulted by her father throughout her childhood and adolescence, from ages 5 to 19, while her mother claimed not to have noticed. A Sunday Times book review describes Pola's portrayal of him as being "furiously intense, disturbingly charismatic, emotionally extravagant — [he] overwhelmed her with attention. He gave her expensive gifts, dressed her in the most beautiful clothes, flattered her with passionate compliments. Little Pola was always "My princess", "My baby doll", "My darling child", whom Kinski insisted he couldn't live a minute without. If they were apart, he might call her a dozen times a day."

Commenting on the autobiography, her younger sister Nastassja said "My sister is a heroine because she has freed her heart, her soul and also her future from the weight of the secret."

== Career ==
In the early 1970s, Kinski studied acting at the Otto-Falckenberg-Schule in Munich.

In addition to gaining early film roles, she acted at the Schauspielhaus Bochum and the Deutsches Schauspielhaus in Hamburg. In the 1970s she worked with Peter Zadek and the director Ivan Nagel.

From 1977 onwards, Kinski worked as a freelance actor in German-language productions. She lived in Berlin and Paris. She has also appeared in several television films, including some produced in the early 2000s.

== Marriage and family ==
She married Wolfgang Hoepner, a lawyer, and they live in Ludwigshafen. They have three children. Kinski is the aunt of American fashion model Kenya Kinski-Jones.

== Filmography ==
- 1977: Das Ende der Beherrschung (TV)
- 1977: Fehlschuß (TV)
- 1978: Yesterday's Tomorrow (Feature film)
- 1980: Ohne Rückfahrkarte (Film)
- 1980: Sunday Children (Film)
- 1981: Don Quixote's Children (TV)
- 1983: Das Dorf (TV)
- 1985: Ein Fall für zwei: Fluchtgeld (TV)
- 1986: Wanderungen durch die Mark Brandenburg (TV)
- 1987: Komplizinnen (TV)
- 2001: Bella Block: Bitterer Verdacht (TV)
- 2004: Tatort: Hundeleben (TV)
- 2007: Wir werden uns wiederseh'n (Film)
