= Vivo V3 =

Smartphone manufactured by Vivo

Vivo V3 Vivo V3 Max
- Brand: Vivo
- Series: Vivo V Series
- First released: April 2016
- Availability by region: April 2016
- Predecessor: Vivo V1; Vivo V1 Max
- Successor: Vivo V5; Vivo V5 Plus
- Compatible networks: GSM / HSPA / LTE
- Dimensions: 143.6x71x7.5 mm; 5.65x2.80x0.30 in
- Weight: 138 g (4.87 oz)
- Operating system: Funtouch OS 2.5 based on Android 5.1 (Lollipop)
- System-on-chip: Qualcomm Snapdragon 616 MSM8939v2 (28 nm) (V3); MediaTek MT6750 (V3M)
- CPU: V3 and V3M: 4x1.5 GHz Cortex A-53; 4x1.0 GHz Cortex A-53
- GPU: Adreno 405, 0.25MiB VRAM (V3); ARM Mali-T860MP2, 520 MHz (V3M)
- Memory: 3GB single-channel LPDDR3, 933 MHz (V3); 3GB single-channel LPDDR3, 666 MHz (V3M)
- Storage: 16/32 GB eMMC 4.5
- Removable storage: Up to 256GB microSDXC
- Battery: Non-removable Li-Po, 2550 mAh
- Rear camera: Resolution: CMOS, 4160x3120 (12.98MP), f/2.1; Features: PDAF, LED flash, panorama, HDR; Video: 1080p at 30fps
- Front camera: Resolution: 3264x2448 (4:3, 7.99MP), f/2.3
- Data inputs: Rear-mounted fingerprint scanner; Accelerometer; Gyroscope; Proximity sensor; Magnetometer
- Model: V3, V3M

The Vivo V3 and V3 Max are Android-based smartphones manufactured by Vivo Communication Technology Co. The phones were released in April 2016.

== Specifications ==
=== Hardware ===
The Vivo V3 is powered by a Qualcomm Snapdragon 616 system-on-chip with an octa-core CPU and Adreno 405 GPU. It includes 3 GB of RAM and 16 GB or 32 GB of internal storage, expandable via microSD.

=== Display ===
The Vivo V3 has a 5.0-inch IPS LCD with a resolution of 720 × 1280 pixels and supports capacitive multi-touch input.

=== Camera ===
The Vivo V3 has a 13 MP rear camera and 8 MP front camera.
