= Sugar (2013 film) =

- Directed by: Rotimi Rainwater
- Written by: Rotimi Rainwater; Tony Aloupis
- Produced by: Rotimi Rainwater; Ari Palitz; Erin Ward
- Starring: Shenae Grimes; Marshall Allman; Corbin Bleu; Austin Williams; Nastassja Kinski; Wes Studi; Angus Macfadyen; Will Peltz
- Cinematography: Gavin Kelly
- Edited by: Michael Palmerio
- Production company: Village Entertainment
- Release date: September 6, 2013
- Running time: 93 minutes
- Country: United States
- Language: English

Sugar is a 2013 American drama released in conjunction with Homeless Youth Awareness Month. The film was directed by Rotimi Rainwater, written by Tony Aloupis and Rotimi Rainwater, and stars Shenae Grimes, Marshall Allman, Corbin Bleu, and Austin Williams.

The film is based on the experiences Rainwater had when he himself lived on the streets.

== Plot ==
Based on true events experienced by Rotimi Rainwater, Sugar is the story of a young girl named Sugar with a troubled past trying to survive on the streets of Venice Beach. Sugar has PTSD after losing her entire family in a horrific car crash. She survives with her group of outcast friends on the streets of Venice Beach, trying to find their own place in the world. Like so many homeless youth, Sugar is running from the pain of her past and will do anything to escape it. However, with the help of Bishop, her counselor in the youth shelter, she is able to reconnect with her uncle who has been searching for her. Sugar's new world starts to crumble when forced to confront the demons she's run from for the last two years. Sugar is an all too common story of a troubled youth learning how to stop hiding, and to start healing.

== Production ==
Sugar began filming on November 30, 2010. The film was released theatrically in November 2013.

== Reception ==
In Los Angeles Times, Inkoo Kang said that "as a whole, the film's characters touchingly illustrate the tolls of living with unresolved trauma and chronic uncertainty, as well as the solidarity and relative freedom this community of outcasts enjoys." For Variety, Geoff Berkshire highlighted in his review writing that "this dramatically inert story of homeless youth reveals a fundamental lack of depth and urgency in its storytelling."
