= Daniela Amavia =

Greek-German actress, model

- Born: Daniela Amavia; 4 March 1966 (age 60); Athens, Kingdom of Greece
- Other names: Daniela Elle; Daniela Lunkewitz

Daniela Amavia (Greek: Ντανιέλα Αμαβία) (born 4 March 1966), also credited as Daniela Elle and Daniela Lunkewitz, is a Greek-born German actress and model, appearing in numerous films and international fashion events.

== Career ==
Born in Greece, raised in Germany and schooled in the United Kingdom, Amavia speaks fluent Greek, German, French, and English. As a young girl she was a dancer, but her teacher told her that she was too tall for the ballet, and suggested that she try acting. She began acting at the State Theatre Corps de Ballet, and studied drama and literature at Goethe University Frankfurt, and acting in London, where she soon received small roles. While studying to be an actress, she also modeled, doing runway work in Paris, France for Chanel and Dior, spokesmodel work for Chloé, and cover work for Vogue, Elle, and Femme.

Amavia won a DIVA German Entertainment Award for Best New Actress in 1995. In 2001, she won the Best Actress award at the New York International Independent Film and Video Festival for the film The Woman Every Man Wants (aka Perfect Lover). In addition to acting and modeling, Amavia also has written, directed, and produced several short films.

In 2003, Amavia appeared as Alia Atreides in the TV miniseries Frank Herbert's Children of Dune. Laura Fries of Variety called her performance "layered".

In 2013, Amavia wrote and directed the indie drama A Beautiful Now, about a passionate dancer who finds herself considering an extreme act when she reaches a crossroads in her life.
