= Klaus Kinski =

German actor (1926–1991)

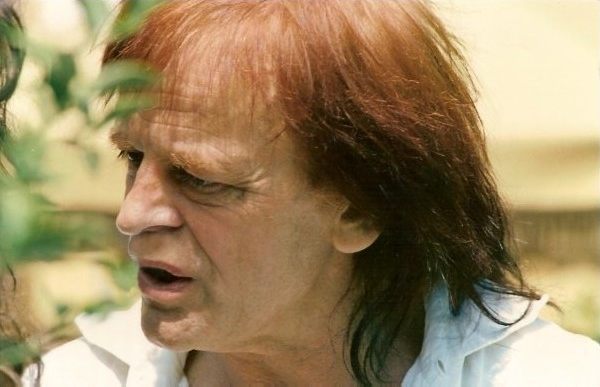
- Kinski at the 1988 Cannes Film Festival
- Born: Klaus Günter Karl Nakszynski; 18 October 1926; Zoppot, Free City of Danzig (now Sopot, Poland)
- Died: 23 November 1991 (aged 65); Lagunitas, California, U.S.
- Occupation: Actor
- Years active: 1948–1989
- Spouses: Gislinde Kühbeck (m. 1952; div. 1955); Brigitte Ruth Tocki (m. 1960; div. 1971); Minhoi Geneviève Loanic (m. 1971; div. 1979)
- Children: Pola; Nastassja; Nikolai

Klaus Kinski (German: [klaʊs ˈkɪnski]; born Klaus Günter Karl Nakszynski 18 October 1926 – 23 November 1991) was a German actor. Equally renowned for his intense performance style and his notoriously eccentric and volatile personality off-screen, he appeared in over 130 film roles in a career that spanned 41 years, from 1948 to 1989. He is best known for starring in five films directed by Werner Herzog from 1972 to 1987 (Aguirre, the Wrath of God; Nosferatu the Vampyre; Woyzeck; Fitzcarraldo; and Cobra Verde), who would later chronicle their tumultuous relationship in the documentary My Best Fiend.

Kinski's roles spanned multiple genres, languages, and nationalities, including spaghetti Westerns, horror films, war films, dramas, and Edgar Wallace Krimi films. His infamy was elevated by a number of eccentric creative endeavors, including a one-man show based on the life of Jesus Christ, a biopic of violinist Niccolò Paganini directed by and starring himself, and over twenty spoken word albums.

Kinski was prone to emotional and often violent outbursts aimed at his directors and fellow cast members, issues complicated by a history of mental illness. Herzog described him as "one of the greatest actors of the century, but also a monster and a great pestilence." Posthumously, he was accused of having physically and sexually abusing his daughters Pola and Nastassja. His notoriety and prolific output have developed into a widespread cult following and a reputation as a popular icon.

== Early life ==
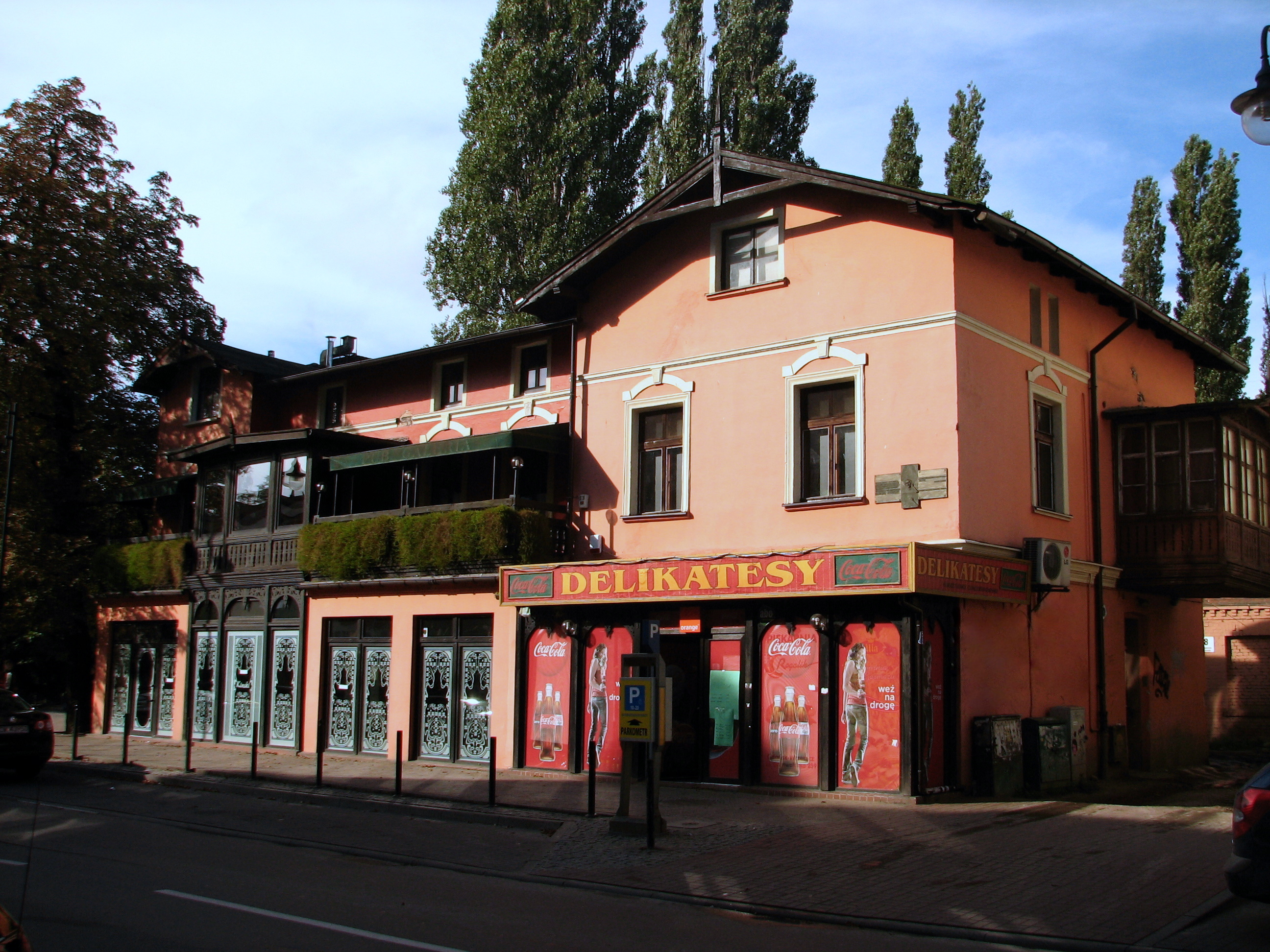
Kinski's birthplace in Sopot, Poland

Klaus Günter Karl Nakszynski was born on 18 October 1926 in Zoppot, Free City of Danzig (now Sopot, Poland). His father, Bruno Nakszynski, worked as an opera singer before becoming a pharmacist, while his mother, Susanne Lutze, was a nurse and the daughter of a local pastor. He had three older siblings; Inge, Arne, and Hans-Joachim. Due to the Great Depression, his family was unable to make a living in Danzig and moved to Berlin in 1931, where they also experienced financial difficulties. The family settled in an apartment in the Schöneberg district of the city and acquired German citizenship. In 1936, he began attending the Prinz-Heinrichs-Gymnasium in Schöneberg.

Kinski was conscripted into the Wehrmacht in 1943 at the age of 17, serving in a Fallschirmjäger unit. He saw no action until the winter of 1944, when his unit was transferred to the German-occupied Netherlands and he was captured by the British Army on his second day of combat. In his 1988 autobiography, he claimed that he had decided to desert from the Wehrmacht and had been recaptured by German forces and sentenced to death in a court-martial before escaping and hiding in the woods, subsequently encountering a British patrol which shot him in the arm and captured him. After being treated for his wounds and interrogated, he was transferred to a prisoner-of-war camp in Colchester, Essex; the ship transporting him to Britain was torpedoed by a German U-boat but arrived safely.

In his documentary My Best Fiend, Werner Herzog claimed that Kinski had fabricated much of his 1988 autobiography, including claims of maternal sexual abuse, incest, and childhood poverty; according to Herzog, Kinski was actually raised in a financially stable upper middle class family.

== Career ==
While interned at Berechurch Hall in Colchester, Kinski played his first roles on stage, taking part in variety shows intended to maintain morale among the prisoners. By May 1945, at the end of the war in Europe, the German POWs were anxious to return home. Kinski had heard that sick prisoners were to be returned first, and tried to qualify by standing outside naked at night, drinking urine and eating cigarettes. He remained healthy, however, and was returned to Germany in 1946.

Arriving in Berlin, he learned his father had died during the war, and his mother had been killed in an Allied air attack on the city.

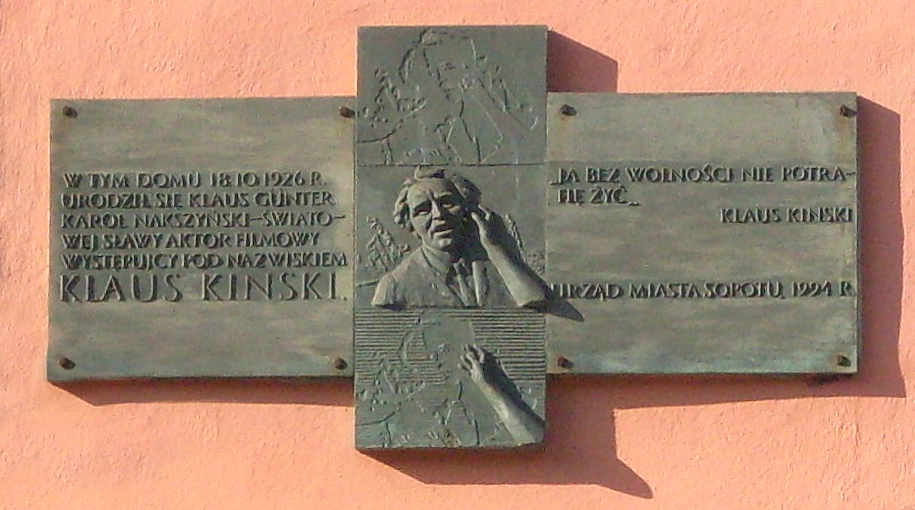
Plaque marking Kinski's birthplace in Sopot

=== Theatrical career ===
After his return to Germany, Kinski started out as an actor, first at a small touring company in Offenburg, where he first used the name "Klaus Kinski". In 1946, he was hired by the renowned Schlosspark-Theater in Berlin, but he was fired the following year due to his unpredictable behavior. He found work at other theater companies thereafter, but his emotional volatility regularly got him into trouble.

For three months in 1955, Kinski lived in the same boarding house as a 13-year-old Werner Herzog, who would later direct him in a number of films. In My Best Fiend, Herzog described how Kinski once locked himself in the communal bathroom for 48 hours and broke everything in the room.

In March 1956, he made a guest appearance at Vienna's Burgtheater in Goethe's Torquato Tasso. Although respected by his colleagues, among them Judith Holzmeister, and cheered by the audience, Kinski did not gain a permanent contract after the Burgtheater's management became aware of his earlier difficulties in Germany. Kinski then unsuccessfully tried to sue the company.

Living jobless in Vienna, Kinski reinvented himself as a monologist and spoken word artist. He presented the prose and verse of François Villon, William Shakespeare and Oscar Wilde, amongst others, and toured Austria, Germany and Switzerland with his shows.

=== Film work ===
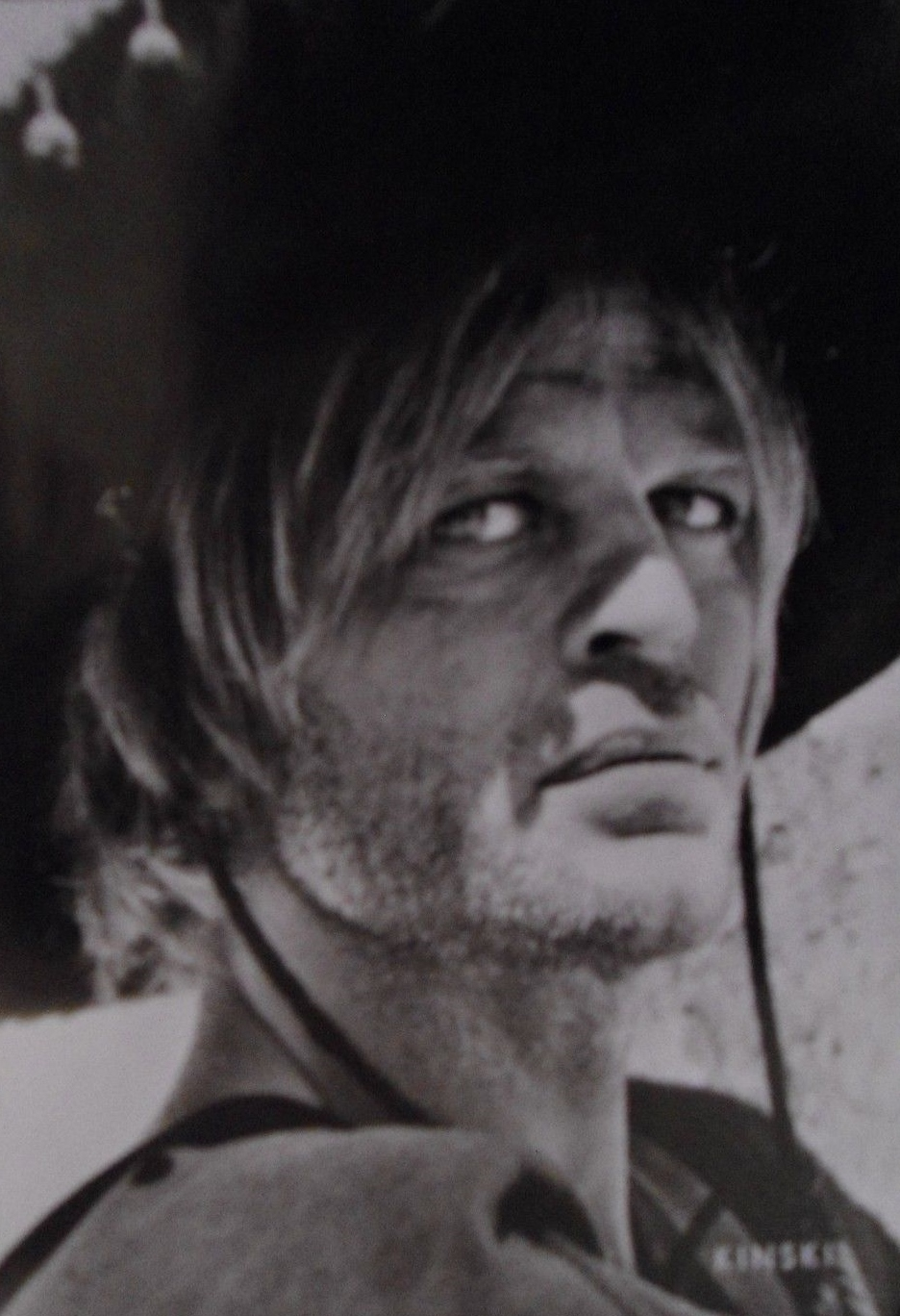
Kinski in For a Few Dollars More, 1965

Kinski's first film role was a small part in the 1948 film Morituri. He appeared in several German Edgar Wallace movies, and had bit parts in the American war films Decision Before Dawn (1951), A Time to Love and a Time to Die (1958), and The Counterfeit Traitor (1962). In Alfred Vohrer's Die toten Augen von London (1961), his character refused any personal guilt for his evil deeds and claimed to have only followed the orders given to him. Kinski's performance reflected post-war Germany's reluctance to take responsibility for what had happened during World War II.

During the 1960s and 1970s, he appeared in various European exploitation films, as well as more acclaimed works such as Doctor Zhivago (1965), in which he appeared as an anarchist prisoner on his way to the Gulag.

He relocated to Italy during the late 1960s, and found roles in numerous Spaghetti Westerns, including For a Few Dollars More (1965), A Bullet for the General (1966), The Great Silence (1968), Twice A Judas (1969), and A Genius, Two Partners and a Dupe (1975). In 1977, he starred as the RZ guerrillero Wilfried Böse in Operation Thunderbolt, based on the events of the Entebbe raid.

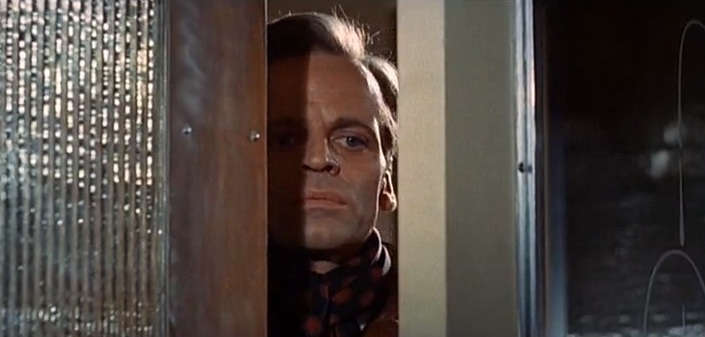
Kinski in Double Face, 1969

Kinski's work with Werner Herzog brought him international recognition. They made five films together: Aguirre: The Wrath of God (1972), Woyzeck (1979), Nosferatu the Vampyre (1979), Fitzcarraldo (1982) and Cobra Verde (1987). The working relationship between the two was contentious; Herzog had threatened, on occasion, to murder Kinski. In one incident, Kinski was said to have been saved by his dog, which attacked Herzog as he crept up to supposedly burn down the actor's house. Herzog has refused to comment on his numerous other plans to kill Kinski. However, he did pull a gun on Kinski, or at least threatened to do so, on the set of Aguirre, the Wrath of God, after the actor threatened to walk off the set. Late in the filming of Fitzcarraldo in Peru, the chief of the Machiguenga tribe offered to kill Kinski for Herzog, but the director declined.

In 1980, Kinski refused the lead villain role of Major Arnold Toht in Raiders of the Lost Ark, telling director Steven Spielberg that the script was "a yawn-making, boring pile of shit" and "moronically shitty". Kinski would go on to play Kurtz, an Israeli intelligence officer, in The Little Drummer Girl, a feature film by George Roy Hill in 1984.

Kinski co-starred in the science fiction television film Timestalkers with William Devane and Lauren Hutton. His last film was Paganini (1989), which he wrote, directed, and starred in as Niccolò Paganini.

== Personal life ==
Kinski was married three times. He married his first wife, singer Gislinde Kühlbeck, in 1952. The couple had a daughter, Pola Kinski. They divorced in 1955. Five years later, he married actress Ruth Brigitte Tocki. They divorced in 1971. Their daughter Nastassja Kinski was born in January 1961. He married his third and final wife, model Minhoi Geneviève Loanic, in 1971. Their son Nikolai Kinski was born in 1976. They divorced in 1979.

Kinski published his autobiography, All I Need Is Love, in 1988 (reprinted in 1996 as Kinski Uncut). The book prompted his second daughter, Nastassja Kinski, to file a libel suit against him, which she afterward withdrew.

=== Mental illness ===
In 1950, Kinski stayed at the Karl-Bonhoeffer-Nervenklinik (de), a psychiatric hospital in West Berlin, for three days after stalking his theatrical sponsor and attempting to strangle her. Medical records from the period listed a preliminary diagnosis of schizophrenia, but the doctors' ultimate conclusion was psychopathy (antisocial personality disorder). Kinski soon became unable to secure film roles, and in 1955, he attempted suicide twice.

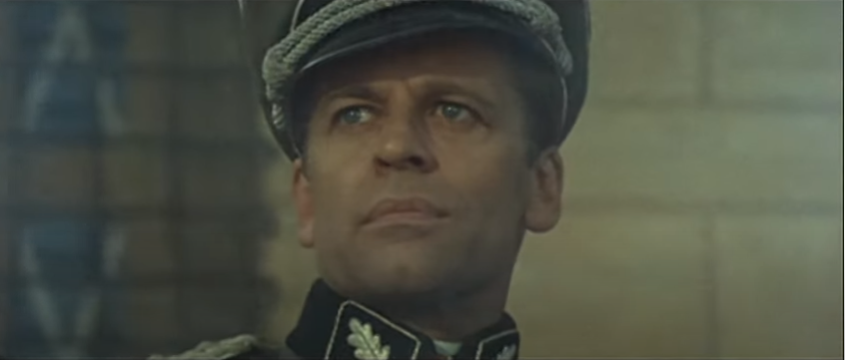
Kinski in Five for Hell, 1969.

=== Sexual abuse allegations ===
During the filming of Vampire in Venice, the boom man on set, Luciano Muratori, stated that Kinski inserted his fingers into Elvire Audray's vagina during a scene where he was supposed to bite her neck, which resulted in her running from the set in tears. Luigi Cozzi stated that Kinski went as far as slamming her to the floor and sexually assaulting her by biting her vagina. Co-star Barbara De Rossi also stated in the documentary Kinski in Italy that she was "assaulted one day. He never respected the script and he was always physical when he had something to do with women. [During filming] he grabbed my breasts and he hurt me".

In 2013, more than 20 years after her father's death, Pola Kinski published an autobiography titled Kindermund (or From a Child's Mouth), in which she claimed her father had sexually abused her when she was between the ages of 5 and 19.

In an interview published by the German tabloid Bild on 14 January 2013, Kinski's younger daughter and Pola's half-sister, Nastassja, said their father would embrace her in a sexual manner when she was 4–5 years old, but never raped her. Nastassja has expressed support for Pola and said that she was always afraid of their father, whom she described as an unpredictable tyrant.

In a scathing obituary of Kinski published in 1991, Spanish film director Fernando Colomo alleged that Kinski had tried to rape actress Maria Lamor during the filming of The Knight of the Dragon.

== Death ==
Kinski died on 23 November 1991 of a sudden heart attack at his home in Lagunitas, California; he was 65 years old. His body was cremated, and his ashes were scattered into the Pacific Ocean. Of his three children, only his son Nikolai attended his funeral.

== Legacy ==
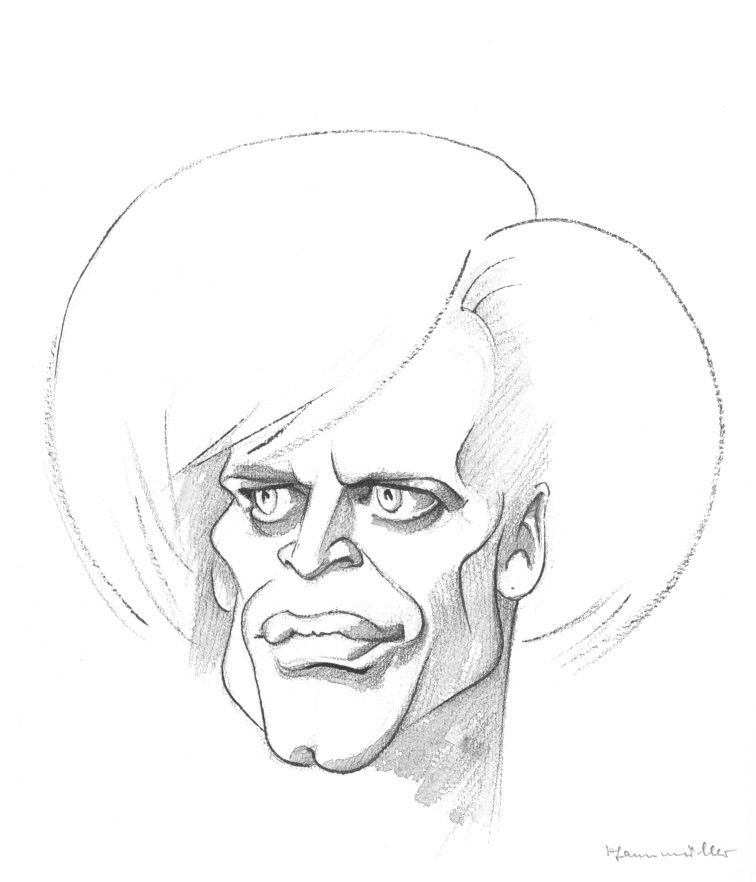
Klaus Kinski in a caricature by Hans Pfannmüller

In My Best Fiend, his 1999 documentary about Kinski, Werner Herzog claimed that Kinski had fabricated much of his autobiography, and told of the difficulties in their working relationship. In the same year, director David Schmoeller released a short film titled Please Kill Mr. Kinski, which examined Kinski's erratic and disruptive behavior on the set of Schmoeller's 1986 film Crawlspace. The film features behind-the-scenes footage of Kinski's various confrontations with the director and crew, along with Schmoeller's account of the events, in which he claims a producer offered to murder Kinski for his life insurance money.

In 2006, Christian David published the first comprehensive biography of Kinski, based on newly discovered archived material, personal letters and interviews with the actor's friends and colleagues. Peter Geyer published a paperback book of essays on Kinski's life and work.

== Publications ==
- Ich bin so wild nach deinem Erdbeermund. Munich: de:Rogner & Bernhard 1975 ISBN 3-8077-0050-1
- All I Need Is Love. New York: Random House, 1988.OCLC 924569732
- Paganini. Munich: Heyne Verlag 1992 ISBN 3-453-05637-X
- Kinski Uncut: The Autobiography of Klaus Kinski. London: Bloomsbury 1997 OCLC 722391492
- (with Peter Geyer) Jesus Christus Erlöser und Fieber – Tagebuch eines Aussätzigen. Frankfurt: Suhrkamp, 2006 ISBN 3-518-45813-2
