= Nastassja Kinski =

German actress (born 1961)

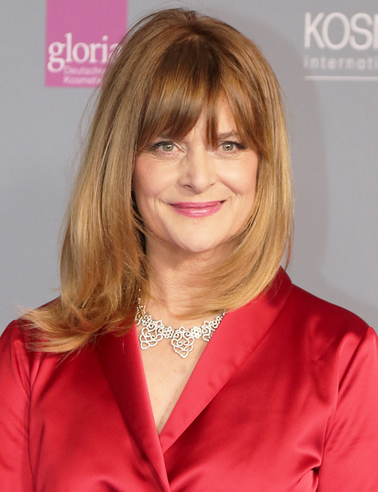
- Kinski in 2017
- Born: Nastassja Aglaia Nakszynski; 24 January 1961 (age 65); West Berlin, West Germany
- Occupations: Actress; model
- Years active: 1975–present
- Spouse: Ibrahim Moussa (m. 1984; div. 1992)
- Partners: Roman Polanski (1976-1979) (Note: Polanski confirmed this relationship in a 1994 interview with Diane Sawyer. Despite this Kinski has denied the relationship.); Quincy Jones (1992–1995)
- Children: 3, including Sonja and Kenya
- Father: Klaus Kinski
- Relatives: Pola Kinski (half-sister); Nikolai Kinski (half-brother)

Nastassja Aglaia Kinski (German: [nasˈtasi̯a ˈkɪnskiː]; née Nakszynski, Polish: [nakˈʂɨj̃skʲi]; born 24 January 1961) is a German actress and former model. She has appeared in more than 60 films in Europe and the United States. Her worldwide breakthrough was with Stay as You Are (1978). Kinski then came to global prominence with her Golden Globe Award-winning performance as the title character in the Roman Polanski-directed film Tess (1979). Her other films include the Francis Ford Coppola musical romance film One from the Heart (1982), Paul Schrader's supernatural horror film Cat People (1982), and the Wim Wenders films Paris, Texas (1984) and Faraway, So Close! (1993). She also appeared in the biographical drama film An American Rhapsody (2001). Kinski is the daughter of German actor Klaus Kinski.

== Early life ==
Born Nastassja Aglaia Nakszynski in West Berlin she is the daughter of German actor Klaus Kinski and his second wife, actress Ruth Brigitte Tocki. She is of partial Polish descent, for her grandfather Bruno Nakszynski was a Germanized ethnic Pole. Kinski has two half-siblings: Pola and Nikolai Kinski. Her parents divorced in 1968. After the age of 10, Kinski rarely saw her father. Her young mother struggled financially to support them; they eventually lived in a commune in Munich.

In a 1999 interview, Kinski denied that her father had molested her as a child, but said he had abused her "in other ways". In 2013, when interviewed about the allegations of sexual abuse made by her half-sister Pola Kinski, she confirmed that he attempted this with her, but did not succeed. She said, "He was no father. Ninety-nine percent of the time I was terrified of him. He was so unpredictable that the family lived in constant terror." When asked what she would say to him now, if she had the chance, she replied, "I would do anything to put him behind bars for life. I am glad he is no longer alive."

== Career ==
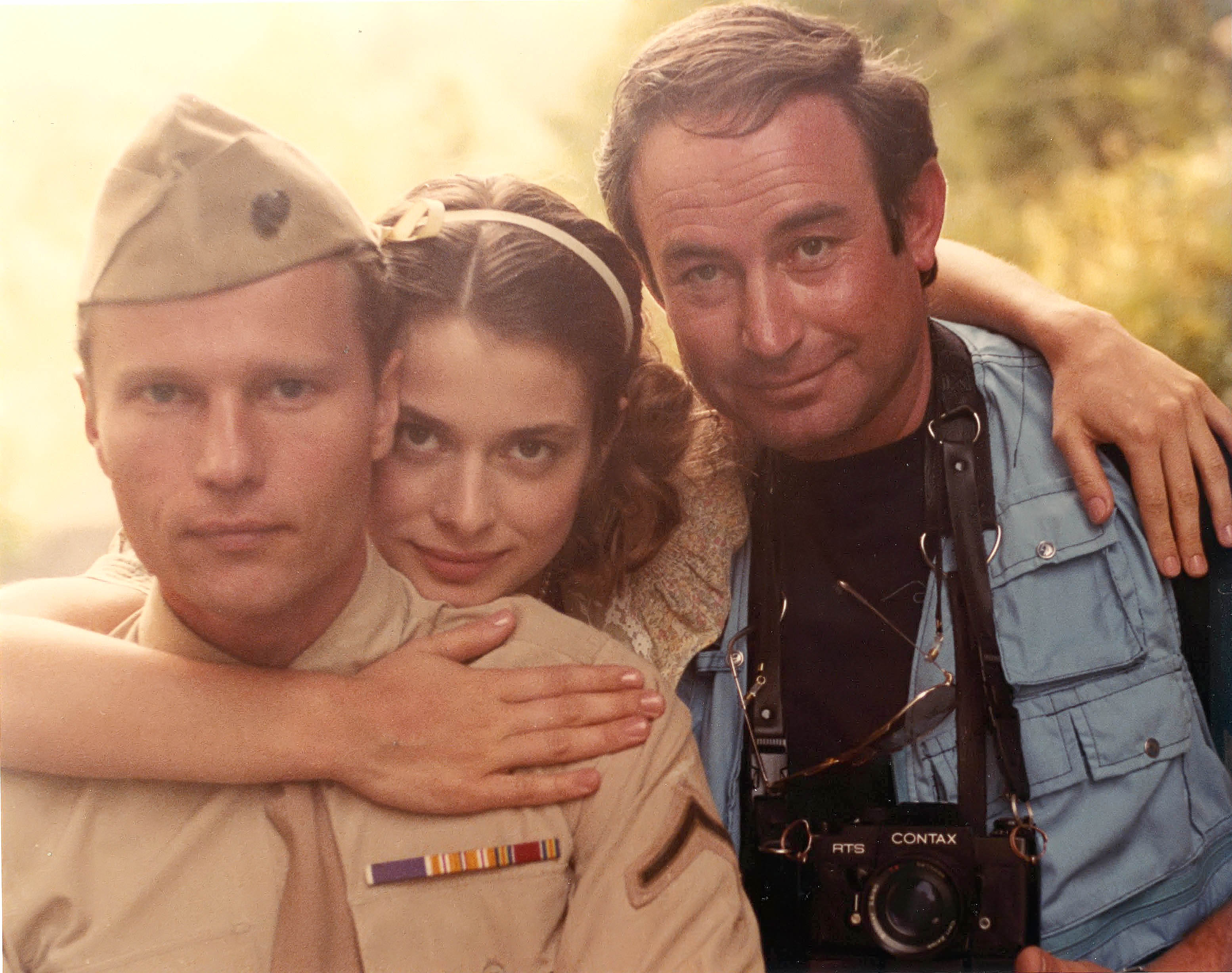
Nastassja Kinski with John Savage and still photographer Yoni S. Hamenachem on the set of Maria's Lovers (1984)

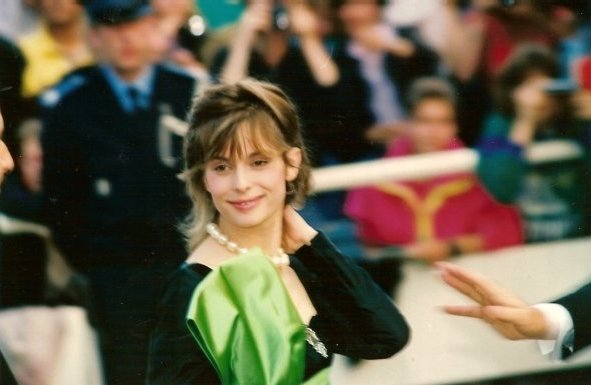
Kinski at the 1990 Cannes Film Festival

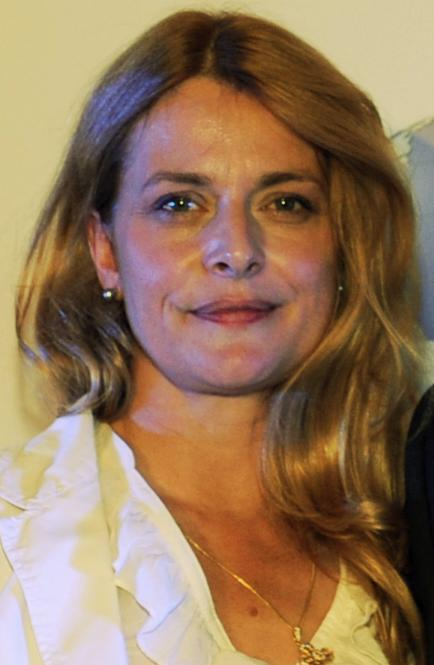
Kinski in 2009

Kinski began working as a model as a teenager in Germany. Actress Lisa Kreuzer of the German New Wave helped get her the role of the mute Mignon in Wim Wenders 1975 film The Wrong Move. Aged 13 at the time, she was depicted topless. In 2026, Kinski called on Wenders to halt distribution of the film, and he did so. She later played one of the leading roles in Wenders' film Paris, Texas (1984) and appeared in his film Faraway, So Close (1993).

In 1976, while still a teenager, Kinski had her first two major roles. She played Sina Wolf in Wolfgang Petersen's feature film-length episode Reifezeugnis of the German TV crime series Tatort, and played Catherine Beddows in the horror film To the Devil a Daughter (1976), co-produced by Hammer Film Productions and Terra Film. The film was released in the UK just 40 days after Kinski's fifteenth birthday, making it a virtual certainty she was only fourteen when her scenes were shot (including full frontal nudity). In regards to her early films, Kinski has stated that she felt exploited by the industry. In an interview with W, she said, "If I had had somebody to protect me or if I had felt more secure about myself, I would not have accepted certain things. Nudity things. And inside it was just tearing me apart."

In 1978, Kinski starred in the Italian romance Stay as You Are (Così come sei) with Marcello Mastroianni, gaining her recognition in the United States after New Line Cinema released it there in December 1979. Time wrote that she was "simply ravishing, genuinely sexy and high-spirited without being painfully aggressive about it." The film also received a major international release from Columbia Pictures.

Kinski met the director Roman Polanski at a party in 1976. He urged her to study method acting with Lee Strasberg in the United States and she was offered the title role in Polanski's upcoming film, Tess (1979). In 1978, Kinski underwent extensive preparation for the portrayal of an English peasant girl, which included acquiring a Dorset accent through elocution studies:

I was given the book almost a year prior to read, I then had to transform myself and lose my German accent completely. I worked with a coach from the National Theatre in London, Kate Fleming. It was almost an intellectual voyage. [...] I went to live in the countryside of the deep part of England, on a farm, did everything they did, and learned it. When the time came in Paris to do my test, it was with our director and our producers Claude Berri and Timothy Burrill, I had done a screen test with Roman prior to that, for Dino DeLaurentis, but now this was for Tess. Preparation is an amazing thing. It, somehow, after all the work, carries you if you are fully present, it carries you through like a bird, like big inner and outer wings.

Tess was nominated for six awards, including Best Picture, at the 53rd Academy Awards, and won three.

On 14 June 1981, Vogue editor Polly Allen Mellen asked Nastassja Kinski what she liked and Kinski replied, "snakes," then a Burmese python was hired for the photoshoot with Richard Avedon, with resulting photograph of Kinski with a Burmese python coiled around her nude body, "Nastassja Kinski and the Serpent, Los Angeles, California, June 14, 1981". The image, which first appeared in the October 1981 issue of US Vogue, was released as a poster and became a best-seller, further confirming her status as a sex symbol.

In 1982, she starred in Francis Ford Coppola's romantic musical One from the Heart, her first film made in the United States. Texas Monthly described her as acting "as a Felliniesque circus performer to represent the twinkling evanescence of Eros." The film failed at the box office and was a major loss for Coppola's new Zoetrope Studios. That year, she was also in the erotic supernatural horror movie Cat People. On 29 December 1982, Kinski made a puzzling appearance on the program Late Night with David Letterman, seeming somewhat oblivious to the jokes and everything else that was going on around her and appearing with an unusual hair style which Letterman described as, "...looking like there was a barn owl perched on top of her head". Letterman continued, "I thought, ok, ask her about the barn owl...". Kinski remained oblivious to his questions. (Letterman's second guest, John Candy, came out with his own hair moussed up in a pile as a spoof of Kinski's hair.)

Dudley Moore's comedy Unfaithfully Yours and an adaptation of John Irving's The Hotel New Hampshire followed in 1984.

Kinski reteamed with Wenders for the 1984 film Paris, Texas. One of her most acclaimed films to date, it won the top award at the Cannes Film Festival. Throughout the 1980s, Kinski split her time between Europe and the United States, making Moon in the Gutter (1983), Harem (1985) and Torrents of Spring (1989) in Europe, and Exposed (1983), Maria's Lovers (1984), and Revolution (1985) in the United States.

During the 1990s, Kinski appeared in a number of American films, including the action movie Terminal Velocity opposite Charlie Sheen, the Mike Figgis 1997 adultery tale One Night Stand, Your Friends & Neighbors (1998), John Landis's Susan's Plan (1998), and The Lost Son (1999).

Her most recent films include David Lynch's Inland Empire (2006) and Rotimi Rainwater's Sugar (2013). In 2016, she competed in the German Let's Dance show.

In recent years, Kinski has once again appeared in several German film productions, including Dark Satellites (2022) and LasVegas (2023).

In June 2026, following years of campaigning by Kinski, Wim Wenders agreed to withdraw Wrong Move from distribution, and apologised to her for the "sexualised" scene he had filmed of her when she was 13.

== Personal life ==
In 1976, when Kinski was aged 15, it was speculated that there had been a romantic relationship with director Roman Polanski, who at the time was 43. Polanski confirmed the relationship in a 1994 interview with Diane Sawyer: "...what about Nastassja Kinski? She was young and we had a love affair." However, in a 1999 interview in The Guardian, Kinski was quoted as saying that there was no affair and that "there was a flirtation. There could have been a seduction, but there was not. He had respect for me."

Kinski has three children from different relationships. Her first child, a son, was fathered by actor Vincent Spano, her co-star in Maria's Lovers. On 10 September 1984, Kinski married Egyptian filmmaker Ibrahim Moussa, with whom she had daughter Sonja Kinski. The marriage was dissolved in July 1992. From 1992 until 1995, Kinski lived with musician Quincy Jones, though she kept her own apartment on Hilgard Avenue, near UCLA, at the time. They had a daughter, Kenya Julia Niambi Sarah Jones, a model known professionally as Kenya Kinski-Jones.

In 1997, Kinski dated married producer Jonathan D. Krane during a brief separation from his wife, actress Sally Kellerman. Over the course of her career, Kinski has also been romantically linked with Paul Schrader, Jean-Jacques Beineix, Rob Lowe, Jon Voight, Gérard Depardieu, Dudley Moore, Miloš Forman and Wim Wenders. As of 2012, she was dating actor Rick Yune.

In 2001, Kinski stated in an interview in The Daily Telegraph that she was affected by the sleep disorder narcolepsy.

Kinski is fluent in four languages German, English, French and Italian and has acted in all of them.

== Filmography ==
Cinema feature films
Year	Title	Role	Notes
1975	The Wrong Move	Mignon	
1976	To the Devil a Daughter	Catherine Beddows	
1978	Passion Flower Hotel	Deborah Collins	
1978	Stay as You Are	Francesca	
1979	Tess	Tess	
1981	One from the Heart	Leila	
1982	Cat People	Irena Gallier	
1983	Spring Symphony	Clara Wieck	
1983	Exposed	Elizabeth Carlson	
1983	Moon in the Gutter	Loretta Channing	
1984	Unfaithfully Yours	Daniella Eastman	
1984	The Hotel New Hampshire	Susie the Bear	
1984	Paris, Texas	Jane Henderson	
1984	Maria's Lovers	Maria Bosic	
1985	Harem	Diane	
1985	Revolution	Daisy McConnahay	
1987	Maladie d'amour	Juliette	
1988	Magdalene	Magdalene	
1989	Torrents of Spring	Maria Nikolaevna Polozov	
1989	Crystal or Ash, Fire or Wind, as Long as It's Love	Joëlle Lavoisier	
1990	The Secret	Lucia	
1990	The Sun Also Shines at Night	Cristina	
1991	Humiliated and Insulted	Natasha Ikhmenyeva	
1991	L'alba	Karin	
1992	In camera mia	Nastienka	
1992	L'envers du décor: Portrait de Pierre Guffroy	Herself	Documentary film
1993	The Blonde	Christine	
1993	Faraway, So Close!	Raphaela	
1994	Crackerjack	K. C.	
1994	Terminal Velocity	Chris Morrow / Krista Moldova	
1996	Somebody Is Waiting	Charlotte Ellis	
1997	Fathers' Day	Collette Andrews	
1997	Little Boy Blue	Kate West	
1997	Off the Menu: The Last Days of Chasen's	Herself	Documentary film; uncredited
1997	One Night Stand	Karen	
1998	Your Friends & Neighbors	Cheri	
1998	Susan's Plan	Susan Holland	
1998	Savior	Maria Rose	
1998	Playing by Heart	The Lawyer	Uncredited
1998	Ciro norte	Venus	Short
1999	The Lost Son	Deborah	
1999	The Intruder	Badge Muller	
2000	The Magic of Marciano	Katie	
2000	Time Share	Dr. Julia Weiland	
2000	The Claim	Elena Dillon	
2001	Cold Heart	Linda Cross	
2001	Town & Country	Alex	
2001	An American Rhapsody	Margit	
2001	.com for Murder	Sondra	
2001	Diary of a Sex Addict	Jane Bordeaux	Video
2001	Say Nothing	Grace	
2001	Beyond the City Limits	Misha	
2003	Paradise Found	Mette Gauguin	
2004	À ton image	Mathilde	
2006	Inland Empire	The Lady	
2007	More Things That Happened	The Lady	Part of the Inland Empire DVD; uncredited
2013	Sugar	Sister Nadia	
2013	Il turno di notte lo fanno le stelle	Sonia	Short
2015	Dietro gli occhiali bianchi	Herself	Documentary film
2018	Nice Girls Don't Stay for Breakfast	Herself	Documentary film
2022	Dark Satellites	Birgitt	
2023	LasVegas	Ilse von Lossberg	
2025	Im Zeichen des Drachen	Anja	
2026	Music in the Forest	Marie	Post-production
2026	Hijamat	Margot	Post-production

Television
Year	Title	Role	Notes
1977	Tatort	Sina Wolf	Season 1, Episode 73: "Reifezeugnis"
1977	Notsignale	Michael's Freundin	Season 1, Episode 3: "Im Nest"
1996	The Ring	Ariana von Gotthard	2 episodes
1996	The Great War and the Shaping of the 20th Century	Rosa Luxemburg	Season 1, Episode 3: "Hatred & Hunger"; Voice
1997	Bella Mafia	Sophia Luciano	2 episodes
2000	A Storm in Summer	Gloria Ross	TV movie
2000	Quarantine	Dr. Galen Bronty	TV movie
2001	Blind Terror	Susan	TV movie
2001	The Day the World Ended	Dr. Jennifer Stillman	TV movie
2001	The District	Trish	Season 2, Episode 8: "Tug of War"
2002	All Around the Town	Karen Grant	TV movie
2003	Les Liaisons dangereuses	Madame Maria de Tourvel	2 episodes
2004	La Femme Musketeer	Lady Bolton	2 episodes
2022	Police de Caractères	Romy	Season 1, Episode 3: "Cadavre Exquis"
2022	Homeshopper's Paradise	Aimée	TV movie
2023–2025	Castlevania: Nocturne	Tera	Voice; 14 episodes

Music videos
Year	Artist	Title	Role	Notes
1988	Sonic Youth	"Teen Age Riot"	Jane Henderson	Archival footage from the 1984 film Paris, Texas
1993	U2	"Stay (Faraway, So Close!)"	Raphaela	Archival footage from the 1993 film In weiter Ferne, so nah!

Museum film installations
Year	Title	Role	Notes
2010	The Clock	Tess Durbeyfield / Irena Gallier / Karen	Archival footage from the 1979 film Tess, the 1982 film Cat People, the 1997 film One Night Stand

Producer
Year	Title	Notes
2000	Time Share	Television film; co-producer
2001	.com for Murder	Direct-to-video; co-associate producer

== Awards and nominations ==
Nastassja Kinski awards
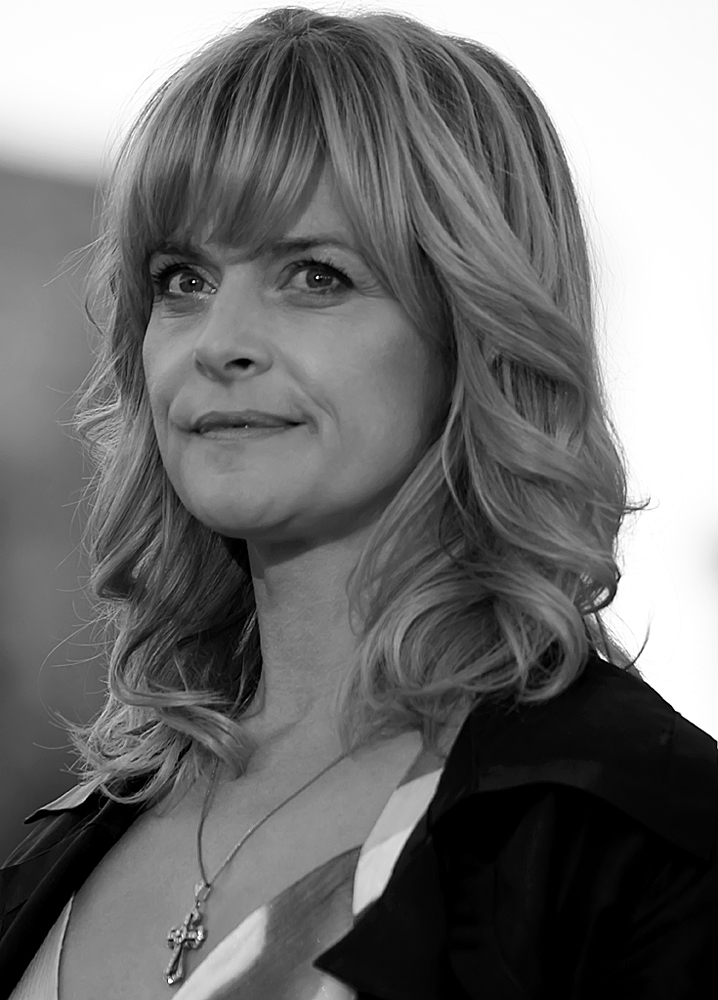
Awards and nominations
Award	Wins	Nominations
AFF Awards	1	1
Bambi Awards	1	1
Bravo Ottos	2	3
César Awards	0	2
DF Awards	2	3
Globo d'oro	0	1
Golden Globes	1	2
Jupiter Awards	1	1
Nastro d'Argento	1	1
Saturn Awards	0	1
UFCA Awards	0	1
WCFF Awards	1	1

Totals (Note: Certain award groups do not simply award one winner. They acknowledge several different recipients, have runners-up, and have third place. Since this is a specific recognition and is different from losing an award, runner-up mentions are considered wins in this award tally. For simplification and to avoid errors, each award in this list has been presumed to have had a prior nomination.)
- Wins: 10
- Nominations: 18

The awards and nominations received by Nastassja Kinski include one Art Film Fest Award, one Bambi Award, two Bravo Ottos (out of three nominations), two Deutscher Filmpreis Awards (also out of three nominations), one Golden Globe (out of two nominations), one Jupiter Award, one Nastro d'Argento Award and one Wine Country Film Festival Award.

Among others, her achievements in film industry include also two César Awards nominations, one Globo d'oro nomination, and one Saturn Award nomination.

=== Acting awards ===
Bambi Awards

Year	Nominated work	Category	Result
1978	Tatort: "Reifezeugnis"	Best Young Actress	Won
Note: Awards are listed in order of the effective years, annual ceremonies are usually held the following.

Bravo Otto Awards

Year	Nominated work	Category	Result
1977	Herself	Movie Star – Female	Won
1978	Herself	Movie Star – Female	Won
1979	Herself	Movie Star – Female	Runner-up
Note: Awards are listed in order of the effective years, annual ceremonies are usually held the following.

César Awards

Year	Nominated work	Category	Result
1980	Tess	Best Actress	Nominated
1988	Maladie d'amour	Best Actress	Nominated
Note: Awards are listed in order of the effective years, annual ceremonies are usually held the following.

Deutscher Filmpreis Awards

Year	Nominated work	Category	Result
1975	The Wrong Move (aka Wrong Movement)	Best Performance by an Ensemble ^{[A]}	Won
1983	Spring Symphony	Best Performance by an Actress in a Leading Role	Won
1985	Paris, Texas	Best Performance by an Actress in a Leading Role	Nominated
Note: Awards are listed in order of the effective years, annual ceremonies are usually held the following.

- A Shared with Hans Christian Blech, Ivan Desny, Adolf Hansen, Marianne Hoppe, Peter Kern, Lisa Kreuzer, Hanna Schygulla and Rüdiger Vogler.

Globo d'oro Awards

Year	Nominated work	Category	Result
1990	The Secret	Best Actress	Nominated
Note: Awards are listed in order of the effective years, annual ceremonies are usually held the following.

Golden Globe Awards

Year	Nominated work	Category	Result
1980	Tess	New Star of the Year in a Motion Picture – Female	Won
1980	Tess	Best Actress in a Motion Picture – Drama	Nominated
Note: Awards are listed in order of the effective years, annual ceremonies are usually held the following.

Jupiter Awards

Year	Nominated work	Category	Result
1978	Herself	Best International Actress	Won
Note: Awards are listed in order of the effective years, annual ceremonies are usually held the following.

Nastro d'Argento Awards

Year	Nominated work	Category	Result
1985	Maria's Lovers	Silver Ribbon – Best Foreign Actress	Won
Note: Awards are listed in order of the effective years, annual ceremonies are usually held the following.

Saturn Awards

Year	Nominated work	Category	Result
1982	Cat People	Best Actress	Nominated
Note: Awards are listed in order of the effective years, annual ceremonies are usually held the following.

Wine Country Film Festival Awards

Year	Nominated work	Category	Result
2000	The Magic of Marciano	Best Actress ^{[B]}	Won
Note: Awards are listed in order of the effective years, annual ceremonies are usually held the following.

- B Tied with Hege Schøyen for The Prompter.

=== Career achievement awards ===
Art Film Fest Awards

Year	Nominated work	Category	Result
2005	Herself	Actor's Mission Award	Honored
Note: Awards are listed in order of the effective years, annual ceremonies are usually held the following.

Moscow International Film Festival

Year	Category	Result
2018	Stanislavsky Award	Honored
Note: Awards are listed in order of the effective years, annual ceremonies are usually held the following.
