= Paper Girl =

2025 non-fiction book by Beth Macy

Paper Girl: A Memoir of Home and Family in a Fractured America
- Front cover
- Author: Beth Macy
- Language: English
- Subject: Rural poverty, political polarization
- Publisher: Penguin Press
- Publication date: 2025
- Publication place: United States
- Media type: Print, e-book
- Pages: 368 pages
- ISBN: 0593656733

Paper Girl: A Memoir of Home and Family in a Fractured America is a 2025 non-fiction book by American author Beth Macy. The book blends memoir with journalism, and follows Macy, who grew up poor in Urbana, Ohio, as she returns to her hometown. She attempts to discover how and why she has become politically divided from family and former friends who remained there. She uses Urbana as a microcosm for the challenges facing rural areas in America, and how those challenges have contributed to political polarization throughout the nation.

Macy attempts to approach the issues with an open mind, and conducts interviews with family and townspeople, many with conflicting views from her own, as well as subject-matter experts. She determines that the current political climate of extreme divisiveness owes much to the policies of President Donald Trump, but concedes that the roots of the issue go back much further and that Democrats and the left share the blame.

Paper Girl was generally well received, with The Washington Post saying that "there couldn't be a timelier book". Other critics praised the book's combination of research and personal insight. Also noted was the contrast between Macy's work and other contemporary takes on Appalachia, particularly that of JD Vance's memoir Hillbilly Elegy. Former president Barack Obama listed Paper Girl among his favorite books of 2025, and the book was a finalist for the National Book Critics Circle Award for Autobiography.

== Background ==
Macy was raised in Urbana, Ohio, in a poor household. Her father was an abusive alcoholic, and her mother shouldered many of the family's responsibilities. At a young age she began delivering newspapers in order to earn money for clothes and school field trips. With the help of extended family, teachers, and community, Macy developed a love of learning and performed well in school. She received a Pell Grant which allowed her to attend college at Bowling Green University.

Macy became a journalist following graduation. She wrote for the Roanoke, Virginia-based newspaper The Roanoke Times and was a recipient of Harvard University's Nieman Fellowship. She began writing books, the themes of which have echoed her journalism work in examining "rural poverty and corporate greed", while seeking out signs of hope in bleak situations. Her book Dopesick, which explored the effects of the opioid epidemic on the Appalachian region, was made into a Hulu miniseries.

After returning home in 2020 to care for her sick mother, Macy was affected by the proliferation of Confederate flags, MAGA supporters, and conspiracy theorists in the Ohio town that had once been a stop on the Underground Railroad. For Paper Girl, she sought to understand how she had become so politically divided from family and old friends who had stayed in Urbana – a city that voted nearly three to one for Donald Trump in the 2024 election, and which has been experiencing a sharp economic downturn. She spent two years making trips there from her Roanoke home, conducting "scores of interviews" of family, friends, and other townspeople, while also researching the causes of political polarization in the United States.

== Synopsis ==
Paper Girl is a combination of a memoir, with Macy recounting her childhood growing up in Urbana along with her return trips there in adulthood, and a work of journalism, detailing her research into rural despair and its effect on political divisiveness in the nation. The book contains fifteen chapters divided into three sections: "Schism", "Silo", and "Showing Up".

Macy reflects on the difficulties she faced as a child growing up disadvantaged but notes that a strong community as well as government assistance in the form of a Pell Grant helped to provide her with a good education and opportunities thereafter. Much of that infrastructure that helped her out of poverty no longer exists, Macy observes, and she seeks to learn why.

She attempts to approach the topic with a willingness to be open to other viewpoints, and speaks with a number of people with worldviews very different from her own. She seeks to learn why political disagreements have reached the point where friends and family have ended decades-long relationships. An interview with Macy's sister reveals that her sister believes Macy's son's marriage to another man to be an "abomination", for instance, while an organizer of a high school reunion dealing with political tensions receives a death threat and resigns their position. Macy contemplates the part she's played: "What was my own role in these breaches," she writes, "and were they beyond repair?"

One of the Urbana residents who Macy connects with is Silas, a recent high school graduate attempting to attend college and earn his welding certificate. Silas, who is trans, has to be a parent to his siblings following their removal from his addict mother's care, while attempting to earn enough money to attend school with unreliable transportation. Macy sees hope in Silas and others of his generation who are seeking to better themselves even while being discouraged from higher education by their parents, who believe college will make their children liberal and not return home.

In addition to interviews with townspeople and family members, Macy also talks to a number of experts who provide insight into the broader themes of political polarization. A historian, for instance, informs her of George Wallace's influence on the spread of the ideology that "government is bad" and its contribution to the erosion of public faith in the institution. Macy places much of the blame for the widening divide between the right and the left on the policies of Donald Trump, but admits that liberals, the media, and the Democratic Party are also complicit. By ignoring the challenges facing rural communities (Macy terms the Democrats on the 2024 campaign trail as "living in Kamala la-la land"), the left only deepened the wedge between those communities and the "urban élites". Macy writes that members of the left are often oblivious to their role in the schism; in response to photographer Sally Mann's insistence that the right has no reason to be upset with the left, Macy tells her that "hurt dogs bite".

== Analysis ==
Jennifer Szalai of The New York Times Book Review acknowledged that Paper Girl is not alone among recent non-fiction in covering the plight of rural America, but said that Macy's own personal history "provides an appealing prism" through which to view the topic. Writing for The Atlantic, Alex Kotlowitz praised Macy's willingness to get "out of her bubble". He contrasts Macy's approach to that of JD Vance, who in his memoir Hillbilly Elegy laid the blame for rural decay at those regions' residents. Macy, however, returns to her hometown with an "open mind", talking to people of all walks of life in an effort to "find a common humanity".

Jessica Grose wrote in The New York Times that Paper Girl, while "sad and sobering", does offer both large- and small-scale ideas to improve rural conditions, particularly for its children. Grose also notes that Macy is running for Congress in Virginia's 6th district in 2026. Grace Byron, the reviewer for The New Yorker, thought Macy naïve in placing most of the blame with Trump, and believed another of her conclusions – that by limiting opportunities for higher education, the super rich are removing the "ladder of upward mobility" from the reach of lower-class hands – to be her more sound argument.

== Reception ==
Paper Girl was released on October 7, 2025. The Washington Post's Leigh Haber called the book "searingly poignant" and "essential". The reviewer praised Macy's use of her hometown as a microcosm of the issues plaguing America, and considers her continuing the work previously done by Barbara Ehrenreich and Tracy Kidder. Kirkus Reviews wrote that, "By practicing the basic journalistic acts of listening and observing, Macy continues her noble work as a truth teller." The Boston Globe's Kate Tuttle called the book "beautifully written and deeply empathetic". Suzanne Perez of the NPR station KMUW praised the book's comprehensive look at the issues facing Urbana and many places like it, and said that Macy's "courage and truth-telling" equips her readers with knowledge that could initiate real change. Jerry Ridling of The Decatur Daily regretted the book's editing, believing it to jump from topic to topic in a haphazard fashion, but allowed that "in spite of its flaws, it tells a story which needs to be heard".

Paper Girl was a finalist for the 2025 National Book Critics Circle Award for Autobiography. Former American president Barack Obama placed it among the top three of his favorite books of 2025.
