= Dopesick =

Dopesick may refer to:

- Dope sickness, the colloquial term for drug withdrawal
- Dopesick (album), by Eyehategod, 1996
- Dopesick (book), a 2018 book by Beth Macy
  - Dopesick (miniseries), a 2021 Hulu TV series based on the book
- "Dopesick" (FBI: Most Wanted), a 2020 television episode

== See also ==
- Dope Sick, a 2012 album by Madchild
