= List of kidnappings before 1900 =

The following is a list of kidnappings summarizing the events of each case before 1900, including instances of celebrity abductions, claimed hoaxes, suspected kidnappings, extradition abductions, and mass kidnappings.

== List ==
Date	Image	Victim(s)	Abductor(s)	Location	Age of victim(s)	Outcome	Notes
99 B.C.		Antonia	Cilician pirates	Misenum, Roman Republic	Unknown	Released	A daughter of orator Marcus Antonius, Antonia was kidnapped by Cilician pirates; she was released following the payment of a ransom.
75 B.C.		Julius Caesar	Cilician pirates	Aegean Sea	25	Released	Caesar was kidnapped while traveling across the Aegean Sea to study in Rhodes in 75 B.C. His captors demanded a ransom of 20 talents of silver for his release; a sum Caesar reportedly persuaded his captors to raise to 50. He was released upon payment of this ransom, and later ensured his abductors were apprehended and crucified.
52 B.C.		Publius Claudius Pulcher (son of Clodius)	Pirates	Alba	Unknown	Raised by Mark Antony	Publius Claudius Pulcher was the young son of Clodius, who was kidnapped by pirates after his father died.
mid-5th to early-6th century		St. Patrick	pirates from Dál Riata	Sub-Roman Britain	16	escaped	St. Patrick was a 16-year-old son of a decurion who was kidnapped and forced to become a shepherd. After 6 years of work he escaped by fleeing to a port two hundred miles away. St. Patrick escaped back to Britain but returned a few years later to convert the people of Ireland to Catholicism.
880		Solange	The son of a nobleman	France	Unknown	Murdered	Frankish shepherdess who, according to legend, was abducted by the son of the count of Poitiers due to her beauty and popularity. Resisting his forceful abduction, her kidnapper grew enraged and then decapitated her. Myths claim that her severed head invoked the Holy Name of Jesus three times, before the body picked it up and walked towards a church in present-day Sainte-Solange, where it dropped dead. Solange has been locally canonized as a Saint to whom numerous miracles have been attributed.
994		Siegfried II, Count of Stade	Norman pirates	(Holy Roman Empire) Harsefeld, Germany	38	Escaped	Count of Stade kidnapped by Norman pirates. He was held in captivity at Harsefeld Castle in Lower Saxony, but escaped from his captors.
13th century		Elisabeth of Wrocław	Bolesław II the Bold	Duchy of Greater Poland	Unknown	Married Przemysł I of Greater Poland and had five children	Elisabeth was kidnapped by her brother Bolesław II the Bold because her family wanted her to marry Przemysł I of Greater Poland for political reasons. The marriage helped the reincorporation of Kalisz into Greater Poland. In 1250, Elisabeth founded a monastery in Owińska. Elisabeth and Przemysł had five children before the latter's death in 1257. He left Elisabeth her dower, in which was an estate in Modrze, where Elisabeth died in 1265. She was buried in the Poznań Cathedral.
1357		Prince Halil, the son of Orhan Bey and Theodora Kantakouzene	Marmara Sea pirates	Izmit	11	Ransomed	The pirates holed up in the fortress at Phocaea and were besieged for months by one ship from Orhan, two ships from Emperor Andronicos (paid for by Orhan). Finally, Orhan himself arrived and paid the ransom of 30,000 ducats ($5.3M in today's money). When Orhan died, Halil was killed by his brother Murad.
1438–1440		140+ victims	Gilles de Rais	Pays de la Loire, France		Murdered	Between 1438 and 1440, hundreds of children reportedly disappeared in the Nantes region. Many of the victims were last seen being taken away by servants of Gilles de Laval, the Marechal de Rais. An ecclesiastical court investigating accusations of murder against Rais found that the victims had been abducted on his orders and sexually abused by Rais and his servants before being murdered and disembowelled. Rais and several of his servants were executed for the alleged crimes. Modern historians are increasingly sceptical of the accusations against Rais, but most consider him guilty of at least some of the charges against him.
15 May 1440		Jean Le Ferron	Gilles de Rais	Saint-Étienne-de-Mer-Morte, France		Rescued	Jean Le Ferron took custody of the castle at Saint-Étienne-de-Mer-Morte from his brother Geoffroy, who had purchased it from Marshal of France Gilles de Rais. Rais later attempted to reclaim his castle; when Jean Le Ferron refused to hand it over, Rais seized it by force with help from a retinue of soldiers before dragging Le Ferron out of the village church and throwing him in the dungeons. Rais was arrested in September and Le Ferron was liberated. The crime led to an investigation which revealed Rais' involvement in the abduction and murder of local children (see above), resulting in Rais' execution.
7 December 1444		Geoffroy Le Ferron	François Prelati	La Roche-sur-Yon, France		Released	The brother of Jean Le Ferron, he was taken captive while passing through La Roche-sur-Yon at the order of François Prelati, an accomplice of Gilles de Rais who blamed the brothers for Rais' capture and his own imprisonment. Prelati held Le Ferron in his dungeon at La Roche-sur-Yon for two months, during which time he was tortured to try and extort a ransom from him, before the intervention of René of Anjou forced him to release Le Ferron. Prelati was condemned to death for his part in the affair.
1455		Ólöf Loftsdóttir	Scottish pirates	Orkney, Scotland	c. 45	Released	Ólöf, an Icelandic noblewoman, and her husband were robbed and abducted by Scottish pirates outside Orkney and imprisoned in Scotland; the couple were released following the paying of a ransom by Christian I of Denmark, who assigned them the task of expelling all British traders from Iceland on his behalf.
1509		India Catalina	Pedro de Heredia	Bolívar, New Kingdom of Granada	14	Released	The daughter of a local chief was kidnapped by Pedro de Heredia to be an interpreter and intermediary, playing a role in the Spanish conquest of Colombia.
1509		Catharina de Grebber	Gerrit van Raaphorst	Wassenaar, the Netherlands	13	Stayed with abductor for four months, then returned home	Parents sued. Court case and sentence are well documented. Abductor was found guilty and sentenced to a walk of repentance. What became of her after that is unknown.
1 October 1549		Edward VI	Edward Seymour, 1st Duke of Somerset	London, England	11	Rescued	The young King Edward was taken captive from Buckingham Palace by the Duke of Somerset, who had been alerted of a threat to his power as Lord Protector, and brought to Windsor Castle where he was held prisoner. He was freed on 11 October when the Regency Council ordered Somerset's arrest and Somerset was later executed for treason.
24 April 1567		Mary, Queen of Scots	James Hepburn, 4th Earl of Bothwell	Linlithgow, Scotland	24	Stayed with captor	Bothwell, who had been recommended as the third husband for Queen Mary by the Ainslie Tavern Bond, took her prisoner on the road to Edinburgh with a retinue of 800 men and removed her to his castle at Dunbar, where he allegedly raped her. After her release, she agreed to marry him and created him Duke of Orkney.
1568		Philip William of Orange-Nassau	Philip II of Spain	Leuven	13	Kept by abductor for 30 years before being released.	Father William the Silent was in disagreement with Philip II of Spain who decided to abduct his eldest son, kept him as a hostage for ensuring the good behavior of his father and raise him as a Catholic. Released 30 years later.
September 1600		Andronikos Kantakouzenos	Ottoman Empire	Giurgiu, Wallachia	47	Murdered	Leading politician in Wallachia during the Long Turkish War. He attempted to negotiate a peace with the Ottoman Empire after the war started to turn against Wallachia, but was taken hostage during negotiations and apparently beheaded the following year.
13 December 1600		Thomas Clifton	Blackfriars company	London, England	13	Released	Henry Clifton sued the Blackfriars Company for abducting his son and the case became known as the Clifton Star Chamber Case
1605		Vincent de Paul	Barbary pirates	Tunis, Tunisia	24	Released	An Occitan French Catholic priest taken captive by Barbary pirates and sold as a slave. De Paul spent approximately two years in slavery—being resold on several occasions—before he was released by one of his masters in June 1607.
1628		Olivier Le Jeune	David Kirke	New France	7	Released	Malagasy boy who was the first slave to New France, where he was sold to a French clerk in Quebec. After the settlement was returned to the French in 1632, Le Jeune was handed to a Jesuit priest who baptisized him and later declared him a free 'domestic servant'.
March 1613		Pocahontas	Samuel Argall	Passapatanzy, Virginia	approx. 16	Stayed with captors	Pocahontas, the daughter of chief Powahatan, was taken captive during the Anglo-Powhatan War by Captain Samuel Argall, who enticed her onto his ship with help from Native allies before holding her for ransom. She was held prisoner for a year, during which time she converted to Christianity, before agreeing to remain with the white colonists around March 1614, later marrying an Englishman and returning to London with him.
1644		Jeffrey Hudson	Barbary pirates	North Africa	25	Released	One of several court dwarves of Henrietta Maria. Hudson was captured by Barbary pirates in late 1644 at the age of 25 and spent the following 25 years as a slave in North Africa before a ransom was paid. He returned to England in the 1660s.
26 May 1665		Elizabeth Wilmot, Countess of Rochester	John Wilmot, 2nd Earl of Rochester	England	14	Stayed with captor	English heiress who refused to marry Wilmot, who then attempted to abduct her. She escaped, but later forgave and married him.
c. 1697		John Bowen	French pirates	Atlantic Ocean	Unknown	Escaped	A petty officer whose ship was commandeered by French pirates. Bowen and others kidnapped later escaped upon the ship's longboat and sailed to St. Augustine. He later became a pirate himself. Bowen died in 1704.
1698		Thomas White	French pirates	Guinea	Unknown	Escaped from captors	A former Royal Navy sailor. White subsequently became a pirate largely active in the Caribbean and the Indian Ocean. His vessel, the Marigold was captured by French pirates in 1698 off the coast of Guinea. He was later enslaved by George Booth and John Bowen before escaping in 1701. He later served as a quartermaster for notorious pirate Thomas Howard.
Early 1700s		Graman Quassi	Dutch protectorate	Surinam	Unknown	Stayed with captor	Ghanaian child who was kidnapped and sold into slavery.
1719		Bartholomew Roberts	Howell Davis et al.	Anomabu	37	Joined captors in piracy	A second mate on the slave ship Princess under Captain Abraham Plumb. Roberts and others were kidnapped by pirates while anchored along the Gold Coast of West Africa. He rapidly embraced the lifestyle and ultimately became the most successful pirate of the Golden Age of Piracy.
1721		John Phillips	Thomas Anstis et al.	Newfoundland	Unknown	Joined captors in piracy	A ship's carpenter; Phillips was captured by Thomas Anstis and his crew in April 1721. Initially forced to join the pirates and serve as their carpenter, Phillips soon embraced the lifestyle. He later became a captain, and captured 34 ships before he was killed alongside several members of his crew on 18 April 1724 by several prisoners they had kidnapped.
June 1722		Philip Ashton	Edward Low	Shelburne, Nova Scotia	20	Escaped	Ashton was taken hostage by pirates under Captain Edward Low while fishing off the coast of Nova Scotia in June 1722. He escaped in March the following year when his captors landed on Roatán Island and lived in the wilderness on Roatán for 16 months before being picked up by a passing ship.
November 1729		Ann Bond	Francis Charteris	England		Released	Charteris, an aristocrat with a reputation for raping women, hired Ann Bond as a maid while using a false identity and attempted to pay her for sex. When Bond discovered his identity, Charteris had his servants hold her prisoner and raped her. He flogged her and threw her out when she threatened to report the crime, and was later prosecuted for raping her.
1731		Maria ter Meetelen	Corsair pirates	Morocco	27	Released	Dutch woman who was abducted by Corsair pirates and sold into slavery to Abdullah of Morocco, who attempted to force her into his harem. She avoided this fate by marrying fellow Dutch slave Pieter Janszoon, and was ultimately freed in 1743 by the intervention of the Dutch Republic.
1758		Mary Jemison	Seneca warriors	Adams County, Pennsylvania	12	Stayed with abductors	Jemison, a Caucasian child, was taken from her family by Seneca warriors. The only one not massacred in her family, Jemison was adopted into the Seneca tribe and lived the remainder of her life with them.
3 April 1768		Rose Keller	Marquis de Sade	(Kingdom of France) Paris, France	36	Escaped	Keller, a homeless beggar, was offered employment by de Sade, who transported her by carriage to his country residence in Arcueil. According to Keller, de Sade then forced her to strip naked and tied her to a bed before beating her, cutting her with knives and pouring hot wax into her wounds. She managed to escape after being locked in an upstairs room by de Sade and brought criminal charges against him, but he was given a royal pardon two months later.
14 February 1779		Kalaniʻōpuʻu, ruling chief of Hawaii	Captain James Cook	Kealakekua Bay, Hawaii	50	Killed kidnapper	Explorer Captain James Cook attempted to kidnap the ruling chief of Hawaii, Kalaniʻōpuʻu, with the intention of holding him in exchange for a longboat stolen by natives. He was stabbed to death by Kalaniʻōpuʻu during a brief, violent melee between islanders and Cook's men, which also saw four of Cook's crew and numerous islanders killed.
1780		Susan Wood	Micajah and Wiley Harpe	North Carolina, United States	Unknown	Rescued	The Harpe brothers, the leaders of a "Tory rape gang" active during the American Revolutionary War who would later become known as America's first serial killers, abducted Susan Wood, the daughter of a Patriot captain who had earlier wounded Wiley Harpe, and another teenage girl named Maria Davidson. Both were forcibly married to the brothers and forced to take the names Susan and Betsey Roberts and spent the next 19 years as captives, travelling across the United States with the Harpes on their cross-country killing spree. Both women were eventually rescued in 1799 when Micajah Harpe was killed by bounty hunters.
1780		Maria Davidson	Micajah and Wiley Harpe	North Carolina, United States	Unknown	Rescued	
1785		Mary Bowes, Countess of Strathmore and Kinghorne	Andrew Robinson Stoney	England	30s	Rescued	Mary was abducted by her abusive husband Andrew Stoney and his servants in 1785 after filing for divorce. During her captivity, Stoney battered her and threatened to rape and kill her if she did not drop the case. The police soon tracked her down, freed Mary and arrested Stoney, who was later convicted of conspiring to abduct Mary.
27 April 1789		Michael Byrn	Mutineers led by Fletcher Christian	Pacific Ocean	Unknown	Released	Four crewmen on the HMS Bounty, they remained loyal to Captain William Bligh during the notorious mutiny. Unable to load them into the lifeboat with their fellow loyalists, the mutineers forcibly held them captive on board until the ship reached Tahiti, where they let them free. The four were later put on trial on suspicion of participating in the mutiny, but were acquitted after their fellow loyalists testified they had been detained against their will.
27 April 1789		Joseph Coleman	Mutineers led by Fletcher Christian	Pacific Ocean	Unknown	Released	Four crewmen on the HMS Bounty, they remained loyal to Captain William Bligh during the notorious mutiny. Unable to load them into the lifeboat with their fellow loyalists, the mutineers forcibly held them captive on board until the ship reached Tahiti, where they let them free. The four were later put on trial on suspicion of participating in the mutiny, but were acquitted after their fellow loyalists testified they had been detained against their will.
27 April 1789		Thomas McIntosh	Mutineers led by Fletcher Christian	Pacific Ocean	Unknown	Released	Four crewmen on the HMS Bounty, they remained loyal to Captain William Bligh during the notorious mutiny. Unable to load them into the lifeboat with their fellow loyalists, the mutineers forcibly held them captive on board until the ship reached Tahiti, where they let them free. The four were later put on trial on suspicion of participating in the mutiny, but were acquitted after their fellow loyalists testified they had been detained against their will.
27 April 1789		Charles Norman	Mutineers led by Fletcher Christian	Pacific Ocean	Unknown	Released	Four crewmen on the HMS Bounty, they remained loyal to Captain William Bligh during the notorious mutiny. Unable to load them into the lifeboat with their fellow loyalists, the mutineers forcibly held them captive on board until the ship reached Tahiti, where they let them free. The four were later put on trial on suspicion of participating in the mutiny, but were acquitted after their fellow loyalists testified they had been detained against their will.
1800		Dominique Clément de Ris	Agents of the Minister of Police	Touraine, France	50	Released	Clément de Ris was abducted by agents of the Minister of Police Joseph Fouché. He was imprisoned in an underground cell, and was released after nineteen days of captivity, on Fouché's orders.
1803		Rachel Fanny Antonina Lee	The Gordon brothers	London, England	30s–40s	Circumstances disputed	Lee, the illegitimate child of Sir Francis Dashwood, claimed to have been kidnapped by the two brothers, but it's unclear whether this was truthful or not. Both were acquitted, but Lee continued to write about her beliefs until her death.
1816		Hugh Glass	Pirates under the command of chief Jean Lafitte and later the Pawnee tribe	Off the coast of Texas, and Galveston, Texas	33–34	Was forced to become a pirate for two years under the command of chief Jean Lafitte, but escaped by swimming to the coast of Galveston, Texas. After, he was said to have been captured by the Pawnee tribe and lived with them for several years.	Hugh Glass was an American frontiersman, trader, fur trapper, explorer, and hunter who in 1816 was captured by pirates on the coast of Texas and was later said to have been captured by the Pawnee tribe in Galveston, Texas.
August of 1825		Cornelius Sinclair	The Patty Cannon gang	Philadelphia, United States	12	released	Cornelius Sinclair was a free black child who was kidnapped and forced into slavery by Patty Cannon and her gang in the summer of 1825. Sinclair was moved to Tuscaloosa, Alabama where he was sold in October of 1825. Sinclair obtain his freedom in March of 1827 through the efforts of several Methodist ministers, Robert L. Kennon and Joshua Boucher, who filed a lawsuit on his behalf.
February 1830		Yokcushlu	Crew of the British vessel HMS Beagle	Tierra del Fuego	9	Released	Yokcushlu was a Kawésqar woman from the western Tierra del Fuego who was taken hostage by the crew of the British vessel HMS Beagle at the age of nine. Yokcushlu and other Fuegians were taken to England, where they were educated in English and Christianity. Yokcushlu embarked on the second voyage of HMS Beagle and was returned to Tierra del Fuego, where she and the other captives were left on Navarino Island. Yokcushlu had two children with another captive and recounted her story to Thomas Bridges.
1841		Solomon Northup	James H. Birch	Washington, D.C., United States	32	Rescued	Northup, a free black man, was lured to Washington, D.C. for a job offer before being drugged and handed over to Birch, a prominent slave trader, who had him shipped to New Orleans where he was sold into slavery by Birch's partner Theophilus Freeman. Northup remained a slave for twelve years until he was eventually located in 1853 and freed through the intervention of the New York State government. He later wrote a memoir, Twelve Years a Slave, about his experiences.
30 October 1850		Unnamed 5-year-old girl	Franklin B. Evans	(United States) Salem, Massachusetts, U.S.	5	Murdered	Evans, a pedophile and suspected serial killer, confessed while awaiting execution for another murder that he had abducted and killed a five-year-old girl in Salem in 1850. He claimed that he had broken into the home of a man named Mills and carried off the victim, who appeared sickly, so that he could kill and dissect her; he then raped and strangled her before deciding against dissecting the corpse and burying the body in a location he could not remember.
18 March, 1851		Olive Ann Oatman	Apache or Tolkepayas warriors	(United States) The banks of the Gila River, 84 miles east of Yuma, Arizona	14	Released	Olive and her sister Mary were kidnapped by a group of Native American warriors who later sold them to the Mohaves. After 5 years in captivity, Olive was taken by authorities from Fort Yuma and reintegrated into society.
18 March, 1851		Mary Ann Oatman	Apache or Tolkepayas warriors	(United States) The banks of the Gila River, 84 miles east of Yuma, Arizona	7	Died	Olive and her sister Mary were kidnapped by a group of Native American warriors who later sold them to the Mohaves. After 5 years in captivity, Olive was taken by authorities from Fort Yuma and reintegrated into society.
21 June 1853		Martin Koszta	Austrian officers	Smyrna (present day İzmir), Turkey	Unknown	Released	Koszta—a Hungarian national—had participated in the political movement of 1848–49 to separate Hungary from the Austro-Hungarian Empire before emigrating to the United States in the early 1850s. In July 1852, he made a declaration under oath of his intention to become a citizen of the United States and renounce all previous national allegiances. While later returning to the United States, Koszta was captured by Austrian officers and confined in custody. Following diplomatic arguments between Austrian and American authorities—each of whom argued the other's conduct in the affair violated international law—Koszta was released and allowed to return to the United States.
23 June 1858		Edgardo Mortara	Police, ordered by Pope Pius IX	Bologna, Papal States	6	Stayed with abductors	Mortara, a Jewish child, was taken from his family by Pope Pius IX because a Catholic housekeeper had secretly baptized him. The child was never returned to his parents, notwithstanding the humanitarian pleas of President Ulysses S. Grant, Emperor Franz Josef, and Napoleon III. At age 18 he was ordained as an Augustinian priest, taking the name Pius.
16 October 1859		Lewis Washington	John Cook and his men	Harpers Ferry, West Virginia, United States	47	Rescued	American planter and slaveholder who was held hostage by John Cook, a leader during the Raid on Harpers Ferry, in an attempt to initiate a slave revolt and who was interested in several relics Washington had inherited. He was later rescued, and testified at the latter trial.
1866		Aster Ganno	Limmu-Ennarean slave traders	Kingdom of Limmu-Ennarea	C. 13–14	Rescued	An Ethiopian Bible translator enslaved by the King of Limmu-Ennarea. Ganno was emancipated in 1886 when a boat transporting her to be sold on the Arabian Peninsula was intercepted by Italian ships.
24 August 1867		Fanny Adams	Frederick Baker	Alton, England	8	Murdered	Abducted, murdered and then dismembered in a hop garden near her home. Her remains were found later that same day, and the killing caused a great outcry in the United Kingdom. The phrase "Sweet Fanny Adams" originated from this case.
1869		Ngataua Omahuru	Māori loyalists	New Zealand	5	Released	Omahuru was kidnapped at age five by colonial forces during the battle of Te Ngutu o te Manu. Taken to Whanganui, he was later adopted by William Fox, who later became the Premier of New Zealand. Omahuru was later reunited with his family.
1 July 1874		Charley Ross	Possibly Bill Mosher and Joe Douglas	(United States) Germantown, Philadelphia, U.S.	4	Unknown	Charley Ross was the first American known to be kidnapped for private ransom who received wide public attention. He and his brother, Walter, were taken by two men from their house under the pretense of buying fireworks. Walter was sent to a fireworks shop, during which time the men left with his brother. Walter was quickly found but did not know where Charley was. The primary suspects, Mosher and Douglas, were killed before they could be proved to be the kidnappers, and Charley was never found.
23 May 1875		Mabel Young	Thomas W. Piper	(United States) Boston, Massachusetts, U.S.	5	Murdered	Mabel Young was approached after church service by church sexton Thomas Piper, who enticed her to come with him up to the church belfry, sexually assaulted her and beat her to death with a baseball bat.
Around the 1870s/1880s		Petrus Kafiar	Unknown	Supiori Island	7	Released	Petrus Kafiar, a Supiori Island native whose father was a headman, was kidnapped at age 7 around the 1870s and 1880s, and was eventually released. Some time later he became an evangelist.
August 1882		Tolbert McCoy	Hatfield family	(United States) Pikeville, Kentucky	28	Murdered	Three members of the Kentucky-based McCoy family who were involved in a feud with the West Virginia Hatfield family. On 6 August the three of them shot and stabbed Ellison Hatfield during a drunken brawl; a few days later, armed men led by Devil Anse Hatfield took them prisoner while they were being taken up to Pikeville for trial and removed them across the state line to West Virginia. When Ellison died of his injuries, Devil Anse arranged an impromptu firing squad who executed the McCoy brothers.
August 1882		Pharmer McCoy	Hatfield family	(United States) Pikeville, Kentucky	19	Murdered	
August 1882		Bud McCoy	Hatfield family	(United States) Pikeville, Kentucky	15	Murdered	
September 1887		Jaja of Opobo	Henry Hamilton Johnston	Opobo	67	Remained in exile	The King of Opobo, which was designated as British territory during the Berlin Conference. After refusing to stop taxing foreign traders, he was lured to a meeting with the British consul Henry Johnston, taken prisoner and conveyed by boat to Accra, where he was forced to agree to go into exile in the West Indies. He remained in exile until his death in 1891.
4 May 1889		Patrick Henry Cronin	Clan na Gael	(United States) Chicago, Illinois, U.S.	42	Murdered	Cronin was a member of Clan na Gael, a Fenian secret society based in the United States. Opponents within the group accused him of being a British spy, and on 4 May 1889 he was abducted by Clan na Gael members who killed him and stuffed his body into a trunk before disposing of it in the sewers. Four members of Clan na Gael were found guilty of involvement in the murder, although two were later acquitted on appeal.
31 January 1896		Pearl Bryan	Scott Jackson and Alonzo Walling	(United States) Cincinnati, Ohio, U.S.	22	Murdered	Bryan was having a clandestine affair with medical student Scott Jackson. When Bryan became pregnant, Jackson and his roommate Alonzo Walling drugged her with cocaine and drove her to Fort Thomas, Kentucky, where they killed her and decapitated her body in an attempt to conceal her identity. Both men were hanged together the following year.
1899		George Muse	James Herman Shelton	(United States) Truevine, Virginia, U.S.	6	Rescued	Two African American brothers abducted as children in 1899 and exploited as sideshow performers due to their albinism. The brothers were recovered by their mother in 1927.
1899		Willie Muse	James Herman Shelton	(United States) Truevine, Virginia, U.S.	9	Rescued	Two African American brothers abducted as children in 1899 and exploited as sideshow performers due to their albinism. The brothers were recovered by their mother in 1927.
23 April 1899		Sam Hose	A lynch mob	(United States) Newnan, Georgia, U.S.	23-24	Murdered	Hose, an African-American man accused of murder and rape, was abducted from jail by a mob of around 500 white people, who took him to a field just outside of town, tortured and mutilated him with knives, and burned him alive. Parts of Hose's body were cut off and sold as souvenirs.
