= Dopesick (miniseries) =

2021 American drama miniseries

- Genre: Drama
- Created by: Danny Strong
- Based on: Dopesick: Dealers, Doctors, and the Drug Company that Addicted America by Beth Macy
- Starring: Michael Keaton; Peter Sarsgaard; Michael Stuhlbarg; Will Poulter; John Hoogenakker; Kaitlyn Dever; Rosario Dawson
- Composer: Lorne Balfe
- Country of origin: United States
- Original language: English
- No. of episodes: 8

Production
- Executive producers: Danny Strong; John Goldwyn; Warren Littlefield; Karen Rosenfelt; Barry Levinson; Beth Macy; Michael Keaton
- Cinematography: Checco Varese
- Editors: Douglas Crise; C. Chi-Yoon Chung; Matthew Barber
- Running time: 57–65 minutes
- Production companies: Danny Strong Productions; John Goldwyn Productions; The Littlefield Company; 20th Television

Original release
- Network: Hulu
- Release: October 13 – November 17, 2021

Dopesick is an American drama television miniseries, created by Danny Strong for Hulu. Based on the non-fiction book Dopesick: Dealers, Doctors, and the Drug Company that Addicted America by Beth Macy, it premiered on October 13, 2021, and concluded on November 17, 2021, after eight episodes. The series was produced by 20th Television, John Goldwyn Productions, and The Littlefield Company. It stars Michael Keaton, Peter Sarsgaard, Michael Stuhlbarg, Will Poulter, John Hoogenakker, Kaitlyn Dever, and Rosario Dawson. The series focuses on how the opioid epidemic started and the people in the U.S. who were impacted by it.

Dopesick received positive reviews from critics, with particular praise for the performances of the cast, most notably those of Michael Keaton and Kaitlyn Dever. At the 74th Primetime Emmy Awards, the series received 14 nominations, including Outstanding Limited or Anthology Series and acting nominations for Keaton, Dever, Peter Sarsgaard, Michael Stuhlbarg, Will Poulter, and Mare Winningham, with Keaton winning for Outstanding Lead Actor in a Limited or Anthology Series or Movie. In addition, Keaton also won as Lead Actor at the 79th Golden Globe Awards, 28th Screen Actors Guild Awards and 12th Critics' Choice Television Awards.

== Premise ==
Dopesick focuses on "the epicenter of America's struggle with opioid addiction" across the U.S. on how individuals and families are affected by it, on the alleged conflicts of interest involving Purdue Pharma and various government agencies such as the Food and Drug Administration and the United States Department of Justice, and finally, on the legal case against Purdue Pharma and their development, testing and marketing of the drug OxyContin under the Sackler family. The narrative takes place across different points in time and centers around numerous intertwining storylines, beginning with OxyContin's initial launch and ending in the contemporary present following the Sacklers' indictment in court. Most of the characters are composites highlighting the broad effects of the opioid epidemic, with the exceptions of the Sackler family, several government figures, and prosecutors Rick Mountcastle and Randy Ramseyer.

== Cast and characters ==
=== Main ===
- Michael Keaton as Dr. Samuel Finnix
- Peter Sarsgaard as Rick Mountcastle
- Michael Stuhlbarg as Richard Sackler
- Will Poulter as Billy Cutler
- John Hoogenakker as Randy Ramseyer
- Kaitlyn Dever as Betsy Mallum
- Rosario Dawson as Bridget Meyer

=== Recurring ===
- Jake McDorman as John Brownlee
- Ray McKinnon as Jerry Mallum
- Cleopatra Coleman as Grace Pell
- Raúl Esparza as Paul Mendelson
- Will Chase as Michael Friedman
- Phillipa Soo as Amber Collins
- Mare Winningham as Diane Mallum
- Lawrence Arancio as Raymond Sackler
- Jaime Ray Newman as Kathe Sackler
- Arischa Conner as Leah Turner
- Ian Unterman as Jonathan Sackler
- Brendan Patrick Connor as Howard Udell
- Andrea Frankle as Beth Sackler
- Winsome Brown as Theresa Sackler
- Alan Campbell as Dr. Paul Goldenheim
- Rebecca Wisocky as Cynthia McCormick
- Meagen Fay as Sister Beth Davies
- Trevor Long as Rudy Giuliani
- Serena Ebhardt as Sue Ella Van Zee

== Episodes ==
No.	Title	Directed by	Written by	Original release date	Prod. code
1	"First Bottle"	Barry Levinson	Danny Strong	October 13, 2021	1DJE01
In the late 1980s and early 1990s, Richard Sackler, head of research, development and marketing at his family-owned company, Purdue Pharma, aggressively pursues the development, licensing and marketing of Oxycontin, a new morphine-based pain relief medication. In the mid-1990s, Dr. Samuel Finnix, a GP in the Virginia mining town of Finch Creek, is highly resistant to prescribing class II narcotics for his patients. A Purdue sales representative, Billy Cutler, convinces Finnix to accept a free bottle of Oxycontin pills after showing him evidence that the drug has a very low rate of addiction and has been approved for treatment of moderate pain by the FDA. Finnix later gives some Oxycontin pills to Betsy Mallum, a young coal miner with an injured back. In the early 2000s, the U.S. Attorney for western Virginia, John Brownlee authorizes two of his assistants, Rick Mountcastle and Randy Ramseyer, to investigate Purdue over concerns surrounding Oxycontin's approval process by the FDA and claims made in its marketing. DEA agent Bridget Meyer also begins an investigation, noting the rise in criminal activity in areas associated with Oxycontin use.
2	"Breakthrough Pain"	Barry Levinson	Danny Strong	October 13, 2021	1DJE02
1996: Some Oxycontin users find the drug only briefly effective and begin to use alternative medications. Sackler invokes the concept of breakthrough pain for such people and recommends doubling the dose of Oxycontin to treat it. Sales are increased subsequently. Cutler invites Dr. Finnix to an expenses-paid, Purdue-sponsored seminar on pain management in Arizona. Initially reluctant, Finnix eventually attends. Prompted by a lie from Cutler, he makes an impassioned statement on the importance of caring for coal-mining communities, and is warmly received by the Purdue team. Unknown to Finnix, the emotionally troubled Betsy Mallum steadily increases her Oxycontin dose and shows signs of addiction. 2003: Mountcastle and Ramseyer investigate an early Oxycontin promotional video featuring testimonials from pain sufferers. They discover the patients, several of whom now have an Oxycontin addiction, were duped into making a PSA on pain management, with graphics regarding Oxycontin added later. Meyer, frustrated in her own investigation, directs Mountcastle and Ramseyer to the DOJ where it is suggested Purdue could be charged with criminal mislabeling of Oxycontin, an offense with a lesser burden of proof than fraud. Ramseyer receives devastating personal news.
3	"The 5th Vital Sign"	Michael Cuesta	Danny Strong & Beth Macy	October 13, 2021	1DJE03
1996: Betsy's healing injury leads Finnix to taper her Oxycontin use, but Betsy stops taking the drug immediately and experiences withdrawal. Coupled with a traumatic attempt to come out to her devoutly religious parents, Betsy's drowsy inattention in the mine causes an explosion. Rushing to the site, Finnix is involved in a car crash and suffers cracked ribs. The ER doctor offers Finnix a high dose of Oxycontin, which he reluctantly takes. At Purdue, Sackler pushes to have Oxycontin registered in Germany, noting that passing the notoriously tough German approval process would enable obtaining worldwide approvals. 1999: Meyer is told by a pharmacist that his efforts to cease stocking Oxycontin, in response to repeated break-ins, were met with legal threats from Purdue. Meyer's DEA superior refuses to authorize investigation, stating Oxycontin is a registered drug and associated issues are a local law enforcement problem. Meyer accepts a transfer to the DEA's Office of Diversion Control to pursue her concerns about Purdue. 2003: Ramseyer undergoes surgery for prostate cancer and resists strong pressure from the medical staff to take Oxycontin for his post-operative pain, despite the nurses using material produced by various pain societies. Mountcastle discovers these societies, their meetings and publications are heavily sponsored by Purdue. Using this information, Mountcastle successfully subpoenas Purdue for their material relating to the marketing and distribution of Oxycontin. Purdue sends five truckloads of documents to his office.
4	"Pseudo-Addiction"	Michael Cuesta	Jessica Mecklenburg	October 20, 2021	1DJE04
1997: Faced with increasing reports of Oxycontin addiction, Sackler hires spokesperson Dr. J. David Haddox who does not believe in drug addiction in a medical situation, instead referring to "pseudo-addiction" which he maintains is caused by inadequate drug doses. In Finch Creek, both Betsy and Finnix are now addicted to Oxycontin. Betsy is a gas station attendant and works with a drug dealer to obtain multiple Oxycontin prescriptions, including clinics in Florida. Eventually catching on to her dilemma, Betsy's ex-partner, parents, and others stage an intervention, with her parents loosely apologizing for their reaction to her sexuality. At her first NA meeting, Betsy buys Oxycontin surreptitiously offered by another attendee. Finnix attempts to go cold turkey and suffers severe withdrawal, during which he assaults Cutler and calls him a "poison peddler". Finnix relapses, buying Oxycontin from Betsy's dealer. 2000: Meyer tries to pressure the FDA and Purdue to change the indication for Oxycontin as a treatment for severe pain only, restrict dispensers and place addiction warnings on the label. Both organizations push back using very similar language. 2004: Mountcastle and Ramseyer discover that a purported key study, cited as evidence by Purdue and the FDA that Oxycontin users have a less-than 1% rate of addiction, is in fact a 5-sentence-long letter to a medical journal. In testimony, the letter’s author confirms it was not a scientific study and should not be used to support claims made for Oxycontin. Mountcastle is suspicious when the DEA suddenly become interested in their investigation.
5	"The Whistleblower"	Patricia Riggen	Danny Strong & Benjamin Rubin	October 27, 2021	1DJE05
1999: Despite being disliked by his wider family, Richard Sackler campaigns shrewdly and they elect him president of Purdue Pharma. Betsy steals and pawns her mother’s jewelry and engages in paid sex to fund her Oxycontin addiction. Her angry father throws the pills down the garbage disposal, causing Betsy to have a violent tantrum. She is committed to rehabilitation. Finnix badly botches a surgical procedure while high. Accompanying the injured patient to the ER, Finnix asks for Oxycontin. The ER doctor has Finnix arrested; his medical license is suspended, and he is placed in 90-day rehabilitation. Finnix asks Cutler to visit. Thinking he wants to make amends, Cutler does so and apologizes for his naivete about the dangers of Oxycontin, only to be horrified when Finnix asks him for some pills. 2001: Meyer organizes a press conference to publicly pressure Purdue into action over OxyContin addiction and abuse. After her manner is described as 'too aggressive', Meyer later crashes a meeting between Sackler, his executives and Diversion officials. She dismisses Purdue's proposed minor modifications and confronts Sackler personally. The Diversion director admits Meyer's confrontational approach is required. 2004: Ramseyer and Mountcastle search for a whistleblower from inside Purdue. They find Maureen Sara, a former administrative assistant at Purdue. Sara was asked to investigate online chat rooms and forums and prepared a report on widespread Oxycontin abuse, sent to Purdue's general counsel Howard Udell and Purdue board members including Richard Sackler. Sara was later fired after developing an Oxycontin addiction. Now clean, she agrees to give Grand jury testimony, but the pressure of doing so causes a relapse and the US Attorneys dismiss her as a witness.
6	"Hammer the Abusers"	Patricia Riggen	Danny Strong & Eoghan O'Donnell	November 3, 2021	1DJE06
2000: Purdue celebrate $1 billion in OxyContin sales. US Attorney for Maine Jay McCloskey sends a letter regarding OxyContin diversion and abuse to all doctors in the state. Purdue officials meet with McCloskey, Sackler instructing them to "hammer the abusers" as law-breakers unrepresentative of legitimate pain-sufferers. Finnix doubts the effectiveness of rehab when realizing fellow addicts have been through the program multiple times, and Finnix still craves OxyContin. Upon leaving rehab, he quickly relapses and reluctantly enters a methadone program. Betsy Mallum fights her OxyContin addiction with intense exercise and prayer, despite being an atheist. She eventually tries heroin as a cheaper option to OxyContin. 2002: FDA officials tell Meyer they will act on OxyContin if it can be proved use of the drug as prescribed (as opposed to abuse) is dangerous. Meyer expends much time and energy on the case, placing strain on her marriage and attracting the attention of 9/11 hero Rudy Giuliani, who lobbies her on behalf of Purdue. Eventually Meyer's team uncover clear evidence of deaths associated with prescribed OxyContin use. 2005: The Virginia attorneys mark the third anniversary of their investigation. Ramseyer interviews doctors imprisoned for illegal OxyContin prescribing, who mention misinformation used by Purdue in marketing. He and Mountcastle show the material to an FDA official, who tells them Purdue were expressly told not to use such material in marketing OxyContin to doctors. The FDA official agrees to give grand jury testimony. Mountcastle attempts to compare notes with McCloskey, unsuccessfully, before learning McCloskey now represents Purdue.
7	"Black Box Warning"	Danny Strong	Danny Strong & Beth Macy	November 10, 2021	1DJE07
2001: Public pressure brought by Meyer and doctors including Art Van Zee force the FDA to place a black box warning on OxyContin, indicating significant risk of serious adverse effects. Purdue negotiate other changes to the label, notably stating OxyContin can be used on a continuous, long-term basis. Purdue estimate tripled sales. A disillusioned Cutler steals Purdue's sales training material. Methadone and counseling improve Finnix’s health and sobriety, but methadone use prevents reinstatement of his medical license. Van Zee suggests Suboxone therapy, which Finnix finds more effective. Diane Mallum rescues her daughter Betsy from a drug den. Finnix calls Betsy, expresses his regrets and the two reconcile. Finnix recommends Suboxone therapy with him, and she agrees. The night before commencing, Betsy calls her estranged girlfriend in the hopes of rekindling their relationship, but discovers she has a new partner and child. Devastated, Betsy takes "one last shot" via a fatal heroin overdose, with Finnix finding out the next morning. 2002: Meyer meets with FDA and Purdue officials to present the study on deaths caused by prescribed OxyContin, without allowing them prior viewing. Effectively ambushed, both groups of officials dismiss the study's findings. Meyer's confrontational style is again scorned by colleagues. 2006: Mountcastle is confident of the case against Purdue for OxyContin mislabeling and deceptive marketing but wants to prosecute the Sacklers personally. Mountcastle realizes senior Purdue officials probably lied during a 2001 Congressional inquiry regarding their knowledge of OxyContin abuse. He hopes the threat of perjury charges will coerce the officials into informing on the Sacklers. John Brownlee, Mountcastle and Ramseyer’s boss, agrees to charge the officials with lying before Congress but is informally told his actions will not be supported by Main Justice.
8	"The People vs. Purdue Pharma"	Danny Strong	Danny Strong	November 17, 2021	1DJE08
2002: Finnix continues to make progress but is told he may never get off the medication that prevents him from regaining his medical license. He encounters Elizabeth and tells her about the medical program that has worked for him. She agrees to try it. Finnix goes to see Betsy's parents and apologizes to them; Diane reacts coldly, but Finnix makes peace with Betsy's father. Finnix starts driving other patients from Finch Creek to the clinic and they suggest he moves back to the town but he rejects the idea, believing the townspeople don't want him there. Cutler is fired from Purdue for the suspected theft of training tapes. He is offered a $75K severance payment but has to agree to sign a NDA. Richard Sackler is informed regarding the nascent Virginia attorneys' investigation and the risk to him personally. Sackler resigns as Purdue Pharma president, appointing CEO Michael Friedman in his stead. 2006: Brownlee meets with Purdue's lawyers, who offer $10 million to settle the case with no admission of guilt by the defendants. Brownlee counters with an offer of $1.2 billion, which causes the lawyers to leave. Brownlee is called at home by his superior and asked to end the case, which he declines. Mountcastle and Ramseyer find out Cutler stole Purdue's training tapes. They meet him, who is now married and training to become a lawyer. He reveals he did not sign the NDA but tells Mountcastle he did not steal the tapes. Later however, he sends the tapes to Mountcastle anonymously. The tapes, which are damning evidence, are used as leverage by Brownlee, forcing Purdue to agree to a $600M settlement with misdemeanor admissions by Purdue's executives. Brownlee is then slated to be fired by Main Justice as retribution when he informs his superiors that he will not delay the settlement, but the decision is later overturned. At the settlement hearing in 2007, family members of OxyContin's victims confront Purdue's executives. Meyer celebrates with Mountcastle and Ramseyer although Mountcastle thinks Purdue will escape justice. 2019–2021: Numerous protesters, including Diane, occupy the Guggenheim museum in New York in protest at the donations they accepted from Purdue. In an epilogue, a montage of new stories are shown, indicating how Purdue and the Sackler family became publicly reviled and institutions across the world removed their name and stopped accepting donations from them. A class action lawsuit resulted in $6Bn of damages however the Sackler family did not face criminal prosecution. Finnix, having since regained his medical license, hosts a support group for recovering addicts.

== Production ==
=== Development ===
On June 17, 2020, it was announced that Hulu had given the production a limited series order consisting of eight episodes based on the book, Dopesick: Dealers, Doctors and the Drug Company that Addicted America by Beth Macy. The series was created by Danny Strong who also serves as executive producer alongside Michael Keaton, Warren Littlefield, John Goldwyn, Beth Macy, Karen Rosenfelt, and Barry Levinson, who directed the limited series. Production companies involved with the series are 20th Television (replacing the initially announced Fox 21 Television Studios), John Goldwyn Productions and The Littlefield Company.

=== Casting ===
Alongside the miniseries announcement, Michael Keaton was also cast in a starring role. In September 2020, Peter Sarsgaard, Kaitlyn Dever, Will Poulter, and John Hoogenakker joined the main cast, with Phillipa Soo and Jake McDorman joining in recurring roles. In October 2020, Rosario Dawson was cast as a series regular, while Ray McKinnon was cast in a recurring role. In November 2020, Cleopatra Coleman joined the cast in a recurring role. In December 2020, Michael Stuhlbarg was cast as a series regular. In January 2021, Jaime Ray Newman, Andrea Frankle and Will Chase joined the cast in recurring roles. In March 2021, Rebecca Wisocky and Meagen Fay were cast in recurring capacities. In April 2021, Trevor Long joined the cast of the series in a recurring capacity.

=== Filming ===
Principal photography began in December 2020 in Richmond, Virginia, and Clifton Forge, Virginia, and continued through May 2021. North Carolina and Georgia were in contention, but Virginia was selected for its tax incentives and locations.

== Release ==
Dopesick was released on Hulu on October 13, 2021. The first episode screened at the Virginia Film Festival on October 30, 2021, followed by a discussion with Danny Strong and Beth Macy. Internationally, the series premiered on the Star content hub of Disney+, Disney+ Hotstar and Star+ on November 12, 2021,

== Reception ==
=== Critical response ===
The review aggregator website Rotten Tomatoes reported an 89% approval rating with an average rating of 7.7/10, based on 73 critic reviews. The website's critics consensus reads, "Dopesick at times sinks under the weight of its subject matter, but strong performances from Michael Keaton and Kaitlyn Dever and an empathetic approach to the very real people impacted by the opioid crisis make for harrowing drama." Metacritic, which uses a weighted average, assigned a score of 68 out of 100 based on 25 critics, indicating "generally favorable reviews".

Joel Keller of Decider called the series ambitious and sprawling, stating Danny Strong succeeds to provide different stories in a non-linear fashion, and praised the performances of the cast, writing, "The series is definitely buoyed by its strong performances, from Keaton’s reserved and reticent Dr. Fennix, to Dever's confident portrayal of Betsy, who just wants to be herself but knows it can’t be in her hometown. Sarsgaard and Dawson do their usual excellent work." Fionnuala Halligan of Screen Daily applauded the performances of the actors, calling the cast "stellar," and praised Strong's writing for not sugarcoating the exploration of the Sackler family and Purdue Pharma's role in America's opioid crisis, stating, "The result is a solid, increasingly effective and satisfyingly well-made drama."

Ed Cumming of The Independent rated the miniseries 5 out of 5 stars, found Dopesick to be an ambitious drama series, saying, "It aims to explore the scandal from the Sacklers down, opening with the development of the drug in the 1980s, to show how greedy bosses and avaricious sales reps were able to hijack the good intentions of doctors all over the country," praised the performances of the cast members and called the script "admirably tight," while complimenting the direction. Kristen Baldwin of Entertainment Weekly gave the series an A−, praised the performances of the cast and their chemistry, writing, "Dopesick deftly corrals the vast addiction epidemic through intimate, deeply engrossing stories of human devastation." Reviewing the series for USA Today, Kelly Lawler gave a rating of 3 out of 4 stars and described the cast as "excellent and empathetic, helping ground the series. Keaton is at his best, mastering a character who's a mess of contradictions and transformation." Matt Cabral of Common Sense Media rated the series 4 out of 5 stars, praised the depiction of positive messages and role models, citing teamwork and benevolence, and complimented the diverse representations of the actors.

=== Accolades ===
Year	Award	Category	Nominee(s)	Result	Ref.
2021	USC Scripter Awards	Best Adapted TV Screenplay	Danny Strong	Won	
2022	AARP Movies for Grownups Awards	Best Actor – Television	Michael Keaton	Won	
2022	Critics' Choice Television Awards	Best Limited Series	Dopesick	Nominated	
2022	Critics' Choice Television Awards	Best Actor in a Limited Series or Movie Made for Television	Michael Keaton	Won	
2022	Critics' Choice Television Awards	Best Supporting Actress in a Limited Series or Movie Made for Television	Kaitlyn Dever	Nominated	
2022	Directors Guild of America Awards	Outstanding Directing – Miniseries or TV Film	Barry Levinson (for "First Bottle")	Nominated	
2022	Directors Guild of America Awards	Outstanding Directing – Miniseries or TV Film	Danny Strong (for "The People vs. Purdue Pharma")	Nominated	
2022	Dorian Awards	Best TV Movie or Miniseries	Dopesick	Nominated	
2022	GLAAD Media Awards	Outstanding Limited or Anthology Series	Dopesick	Nominated	
2022	Golden Globe Awards	Best Miniseries or Television Film	Dopesick	Nominated	
2022	Golden Globe Awards	Best Actor in a Miniseries or Television Film	Michael Keaton	Won	
2022	Golden Globe Awards	Best Supporting Actress in a Series, Miniseries or Television Film	Kaitlyn Dever	Nominated	
2022	Hollywood Critics Association TV Awards	Best Streaming Limited or Anthology Series	Dopesick	Won	
2022	Hollywood Critics Association TV Awards	Best Actor in a Streaming Limited or Anthology Series or Movie	Michael Keaton	Won	
2022	Hollywood Critics Association TV Awards	Best Supporting Actor in a Streaming Limited or Anthology Series or Movie	Michael Stuhlbarg	Nominated	
2022	Hollywood Critics Association TV Awards	Best Supporting Actor in a Streaming Limited or Anthology Series or Movie	Peter Sarsgaard	Nominated	
2022	Hollywood Critics Association TV Awards	Best Supporting Actor in a Streaming Limited or Anthology Series or Movie	Will Poulter	Nominated	
2022	Hollywood Critics Association TV Awards	Best Supporting Actress in a Streaming Limited or Anthology Series or Movie	Rosario Dawson	Nominated	
2022	Hollywood Critics Association TV Awards	Best Supporting Actress in a Streaming Limited or Anthology Series or Movie	Kaitlyn Dever	Won	
2022	Hollywood Critics Association TV Awards	Best Directing in a Streaming Limited or Anthology Series or Movie	Danny Strong (for "The People vs. Purdue Pharma")	Nominated	
2022	Hollywood Critics Association TV Awards	Best Writing in a Streaming Limited or Anthology Series or Movie	Danny Strong (for "The People vs. Purdue Pharma")	Won	
2022	Peabody Awards	Entertainment	Dopesick	Won	
2022	Primetime Emmy Awards	Outstanding Limited or Anthology Series	Danny Strong, John Goldwyn, Warren Littlefield, Karen Rosenfelt, Barry Levinson, Beth Macy, Michael Keaton, Jane Bartelme, Mandy Safavi, Eoghan O'Donnell, Jessica Mecklenburg, Ann Johnson, and Graham Littlefield	Nominated	
2022	Primetime Emmy Awards	Outstanding Lead Actor in a Limited or Anthology Series or Movie	Michael Keaton	Won	
2022	Primetime Emmy Awards	Outstanding Supporting Actor in a Limited or Anthology Series or Movie	Will Poulter	Nominated	
2022	Primetime Emmy Awards	Outstanding Supporting Actor in a Limited or Anthology Series or Movie	Peter Sarsgaard	Nominated	
2022	Primetime Emmy Awards	Outstanding Supporting Actor in a Limited or Anthology Series or Movie	Michael Stuhlbarg	Nominated	
2022	Primetime Emmy Awards	Outstanding Supporting Actress in a Limited or Anthology Series or Movie	Kaitlyn Dever	Nominated	
2022	Primetime Emmy Awards	Outstanding Supporting Actress in a Limited or Anthology Series or Movie	Mare Winningham	Nominated	
2022	Primetime Emmy Awards	Outstanding Directing for a Limited or Anthology Series or Movie	Danny Strong (for "The People vs. Purdue Pharma")	Nominated	
2022	Primetime Emmy Awards	Outstanding Writing for a Limited or Anthology Series or Movie	Danny Strong (for "The People vs. Purdue Pharma")	Nominated	
2022	Primetime Creative Arts Emmy Awards	Outstanding Casting for a Limited or Anthology Series or Movie	Avy Kaufman and Erica Arvold	Nominated	
2022	Primetime Creative Arts Emmy Awards	Outstanding Cinematography for a Limited or Anthology Series or Movie	Checco Varese (for "Breakthrough Pain")	Won	
2022	Primetime Creative Arts Emmy Awards	Outstanding Single-Camera Picture Editing for a Limited or Anthology Series or Movie	C. Chi-yoon Chung (for "Black Box Warning")	Nominated	
2022	Primetime Creative Arts Emmy Awards	Outstanding Single-Camera Picture Editing for a Limited or Anthology Series or Movie	Douglas Crise (for "First Bottle")	Nominated	
2022	Primetime Creative Arts Emmy Awards	Outstanding Sound Mixing for a Limited or Anthology Series or Movie	Nick Offord, Ryan Collins, and Jay Meagher (for "Pseudo-Addiction")	Nominated	
2022	Producers Guild of America Awards	Outstanding Producer of Limited or Anthology Television Series	Dopesick	Nominated	
2022	Screen Actors Guild Awards	Outstanding Performance by a Male Actor in a Miniseries or Television Movie	Michael Keaton	Won	
2022	Television Critics Association Awards	Outstanding Achievement in Movies, Miniseries and Specials	Dopesick	Won	
2022	Television Critics Association Awards	Individual Achievement in Drama	Michael Keaton	Nominated	
2023	Artios Awards	Outstanding Achievement in Casting – Limited Series	Dopesick	Won	

=== Viewership ===
Analytics company Samba TV, which gathers viewership data from certain smart TVs and content providers, reported that the first episode of Dopesick was streamed by 261,000 U.S. households on Hulu within its first four days. Nielsen Media Research, which records streaming viewership on U.S. television screens, estimated that the series was watched for 214 million minutes from November 8–14, 2021. According to market research company Parrot Analytics, which looks at consumer engagement in consumer research, streaming, downloads, and on social media, Dopesick demonstrated significant audience interest for the period leading up to the 74th annual Emmy Awards during the eligibility period from June 1, 2021, to May 31, 2022. It had a notable demand of 12.62 times the average series demand, placing it among the higher-demand nominees in the Outstanding Limited or Anthology Series category. The series later saw a notable 10.8% increase in demand following its season finale, which aired on November 17, 2021. This uptick in interest was part of the show's strong performance over its first month, during which episodes were released weekly. The Hulu original continued to maintain high demand, reflecting its sustained popularity and engagement with viewers. Dopesick was one of Hulu's top-performing originals this year, based on U.S. consumer demand as measured by Parrot Analytics in 2022. The series has achieved "outstanding demand" by placing it in the top 2.9% of TV series across all platforms.

== See also ==
- Painkiller (TV series)
