= 79th Golden Globe Awards =

Film award ceremony in 2022

- Date: January 9, 2022
- Site: The Beverly Hilton, Beverly Hills, California, U.S.

Highlights
- Best Film: Drama: The Power of the Dog
- Best Film: Musical or Comedy: West Side Story
- Best Drama Series: Succession
- Best Musical or Comedy Series: Hacks
- Best Miniseries or Television movie: The Underground Railroad
- Most awards: The Power of the Dog; Succession; West Side Story (3)
- Most nominations: Belfast; The Power of the Dog (7)

The 79th Golden Globe Awards honored the best in film and American television of 2021, as chosen by the Hollywood Foreign Press Association (HFPA). The ceremony took place privately on January 9, 2022. The nominees were announced on December 13, 2021, by rapper Snoop Dogg and HFPA president Helen Hoehne.

For the first time since 2008, there was no traditional, televised ceremony. In support of boycotts of the HFPA by various media companies, actors, and other creatives over its lack of action to increase the membership diversity of the organization, the Golden Globes' regular broadcaster NBC declined to televise the 79th Golden Globe Awards. The HFPA ultimately chose to hold the presentation privately, with attendance limited to the organization's beneficiaries, and results announced via press release and highlighted on the Golden Globes' social media pages.

Belfast and The Power of the Dog tied for the most nominations with seven each, while the latter's three awards (including Best Motion Picture – Drama) tied with West Side Story (Best Motion Picture – Musical or Comedy) and HBO's Succession (Best Television Series – Drama) for the most wins of the night.

== Ceremony information ==
On May 10, 2021, NBC announced that it would not televise the ceremony, in support of a boycott of the HFPA by multiple media companies over what it criticized as insufficient efforts to increase the membership diversity of the organization. NBC added that it would be open to televising the ceremony in 2023 if the HFPA were successful in its efforts to reform its organization. Following these events, the HFPA released a timeline for its reforms, which would see the process completed by the week of August 2, 2021. On October 1, 2021, the HFPA released a list of 21 new members that it had recruited under these reforms.

The HFPA then announced on October 15 that it still planned to hold the 79th Golden Globe Awards on January 9, 2022, with or without a telecast. It was then reported that the HFPA would not require its normal submission process and screening requirements for the year. NBC ultimately aired Sunday Night Football as usual on the night of the ceremony, with the 2021 NFL season having extended the regular season to 17 game, 18-week season for the first time.

Details of the ceremony remained unclear when the HFPA announced the nominations on December 13, including whether the nominees would continue to boycott the ceremony. Following the announcement of nominations, The New York Times wrote that the HFPA's choices represented improvement on its goal to diversify itself, but it along with many other publications doubted its effectiveness. In support of the boycott, many studios chose not to acknowledge Golden Globes nominations in their "For Your Consideration" marketing.

On January 6, the HFPA announced that the ceremony would be held privately, with the winners announced via its social media platforms and press releases. It marked the first time since the 36th Golden Globe Awards in 1979 that there was no telecast and the 65th Golden Globe Awards in 2008 that there was no traditional ceremony. The HFPA stated that the 90-minute event would primarily highlight the organization's philanthropic efforts and be interspersed with the award presentations. After reportedly being unable to secure celebrities to serve as presenters, attendance was limited to those associated with the HFPA's beneficiaries, and no nominees, guests, or credentialed media were in attendance. The private ceremony was held under strict COVID-19 protocol due to the Omicron variant's widespread surge in Los Angeles.

== Winners and nominees ==
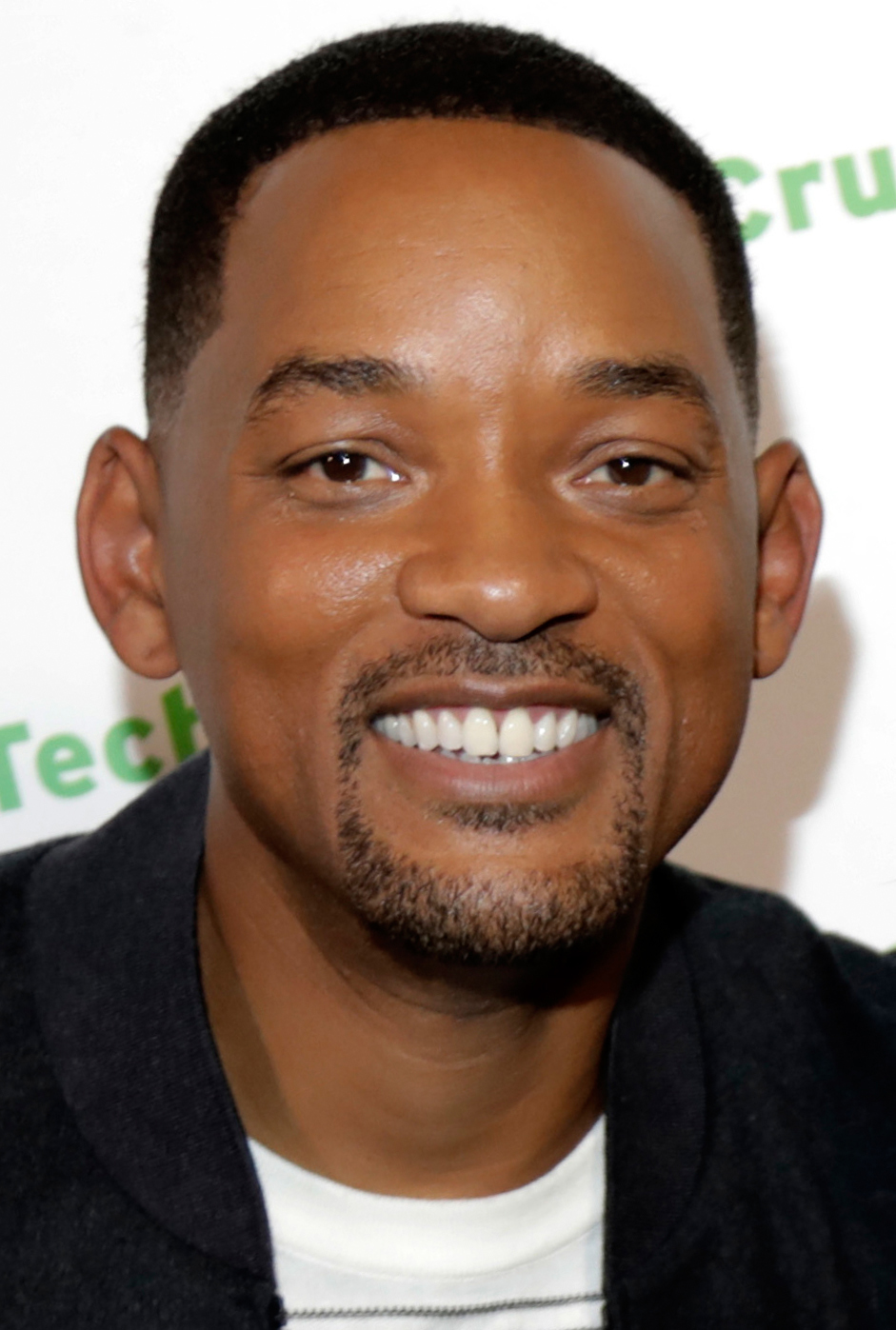
Will Smith, Best Actor in a Motion Picture – Drama winner

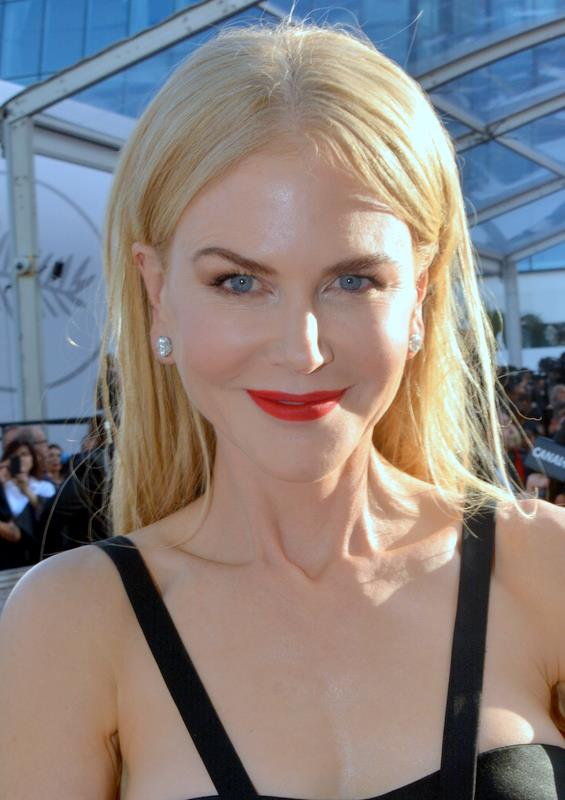
Nicole Kidman, Best Actress in a Motion Picture – Drama winner

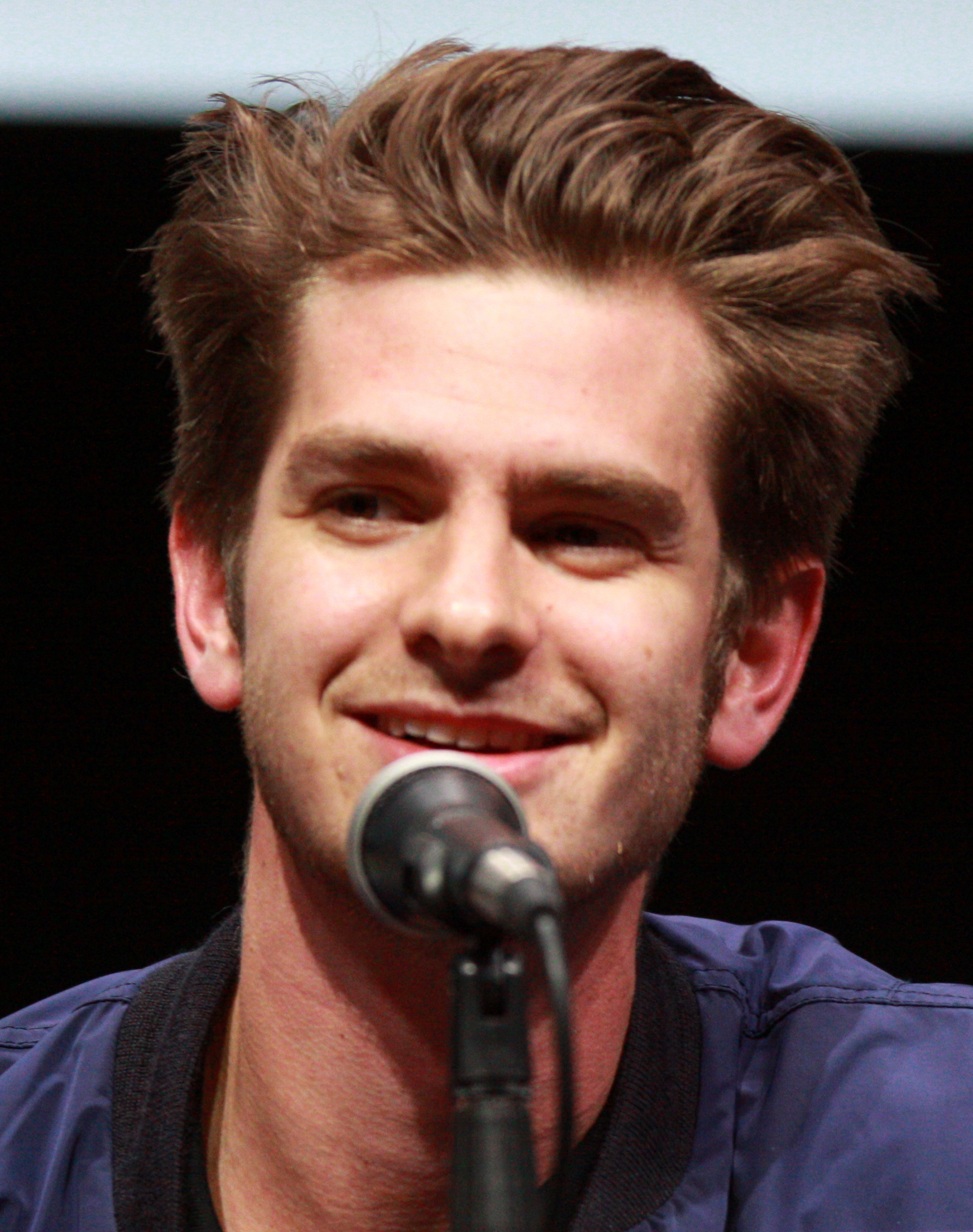
Andrew Garfield, Best Actor in a Motion Picture – Musical or Comedy winner

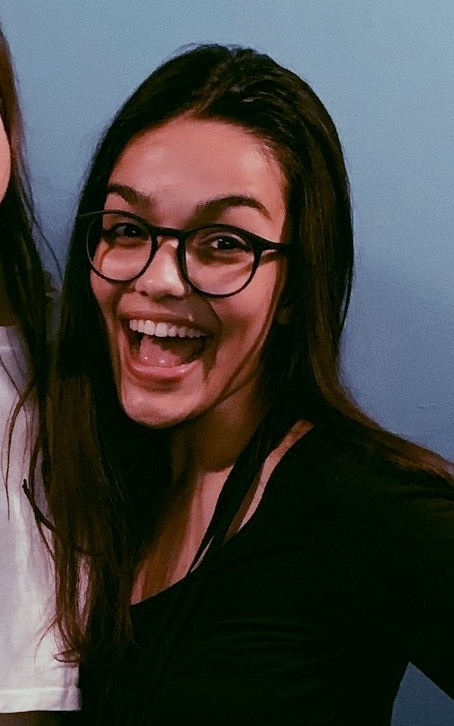
Rachel Zegler, Best Actress in a Motion Picture – Musical or Comedy winner

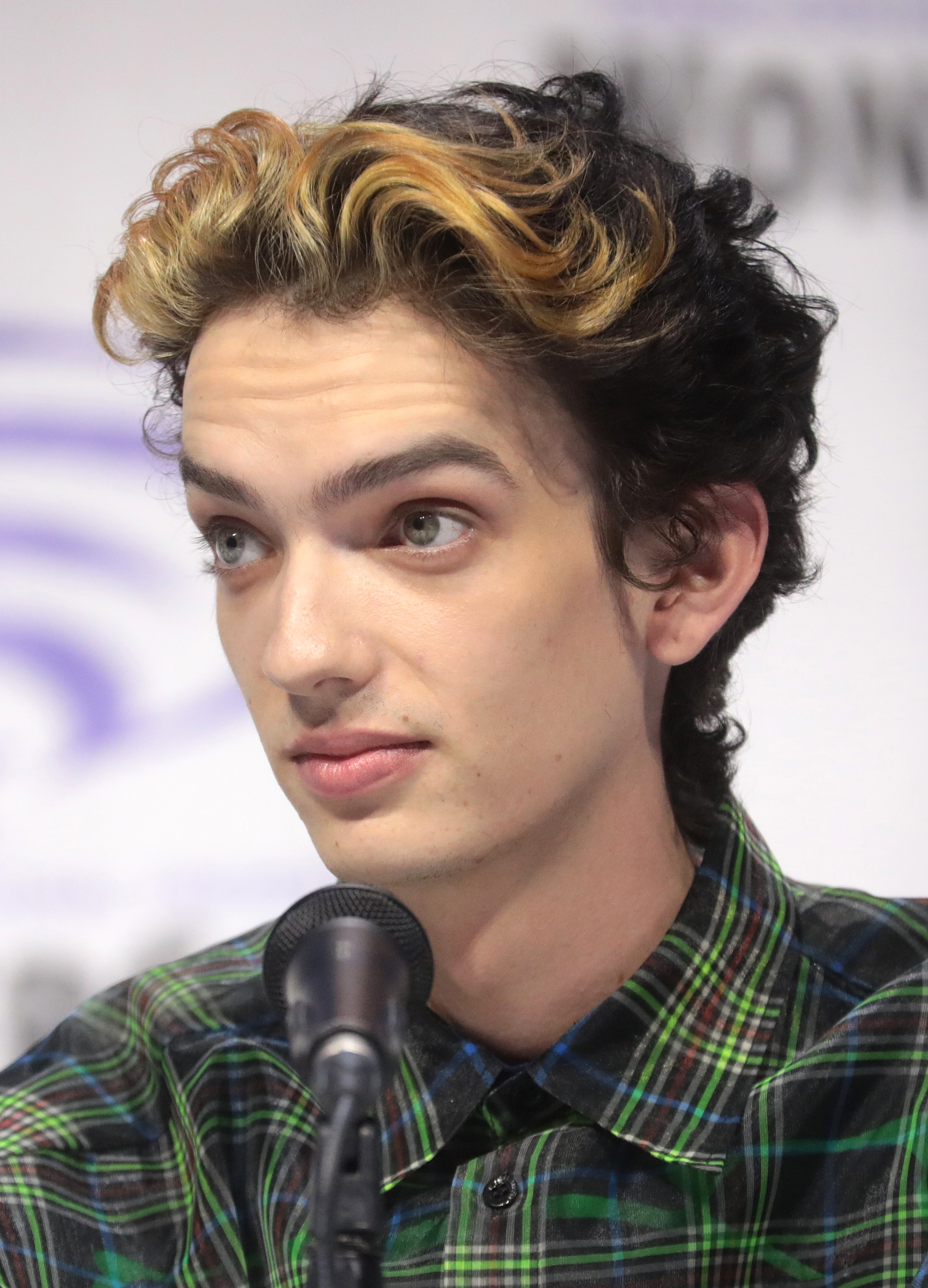
Kodi Smit-McPhee, Best Supporting Actor winner

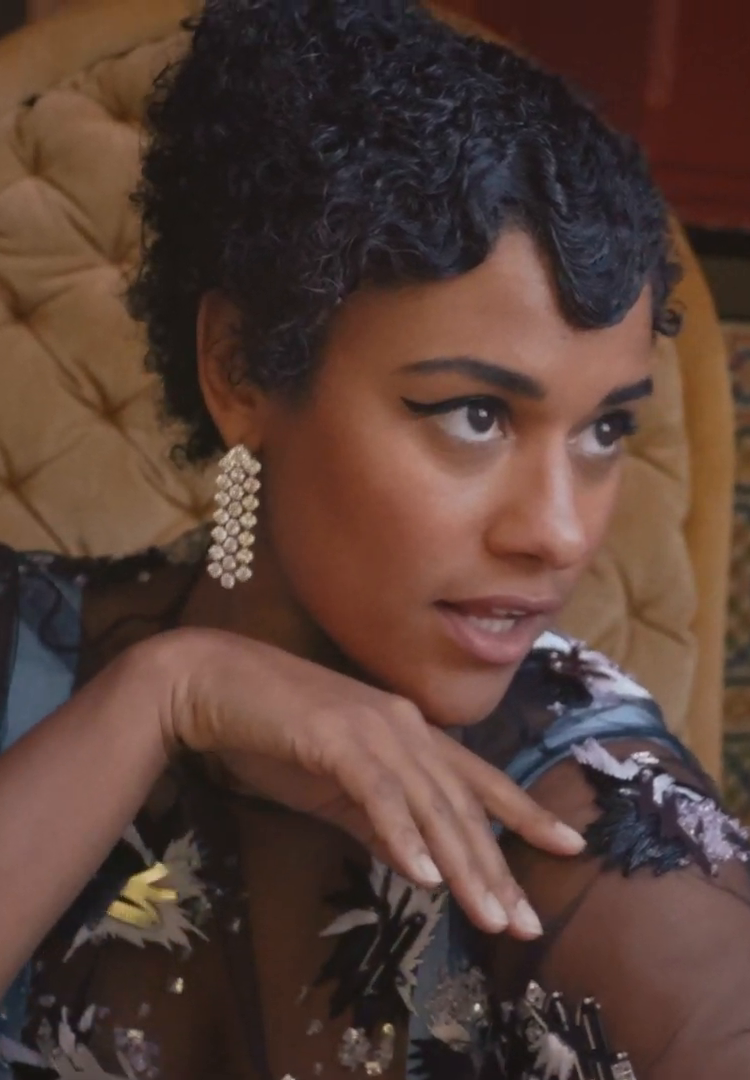
Ariana DeBose, Best Supporting Actress winner

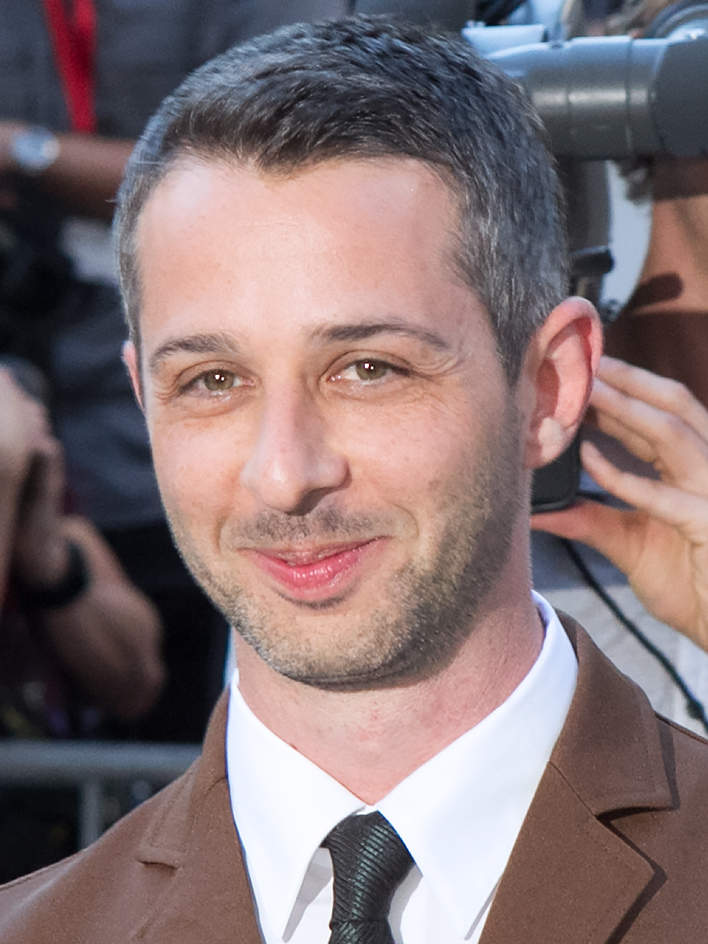
Jeremy Strong, Best Actor in a Television Series – Drama winner

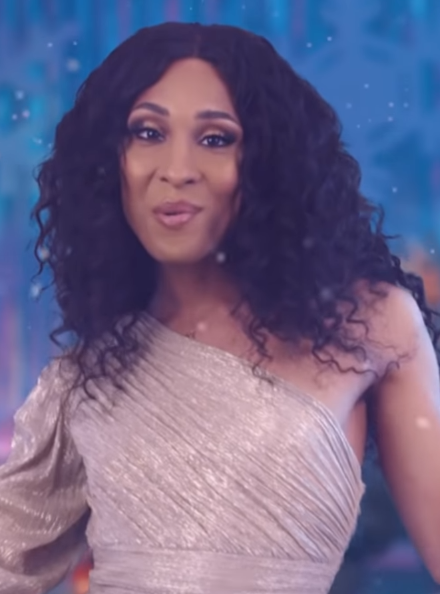
Michaela Jaé Rodriguez, Best Actress in a Television Series – Drama winner

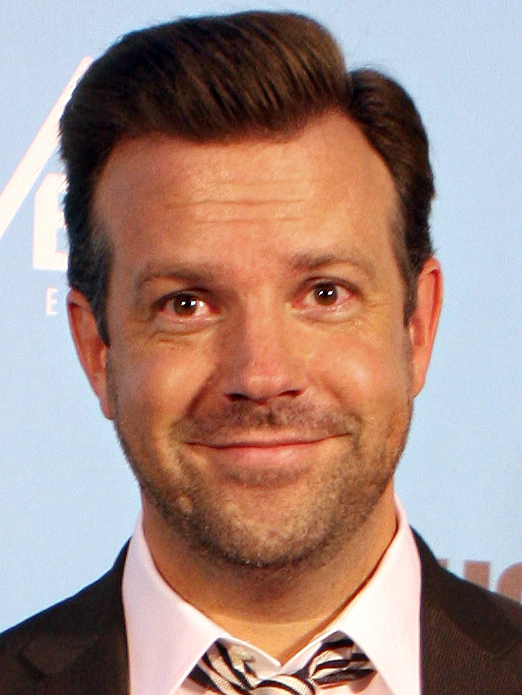
Jason Sudeikis, Best Actor in a Television Series – Musical or Comedy winner

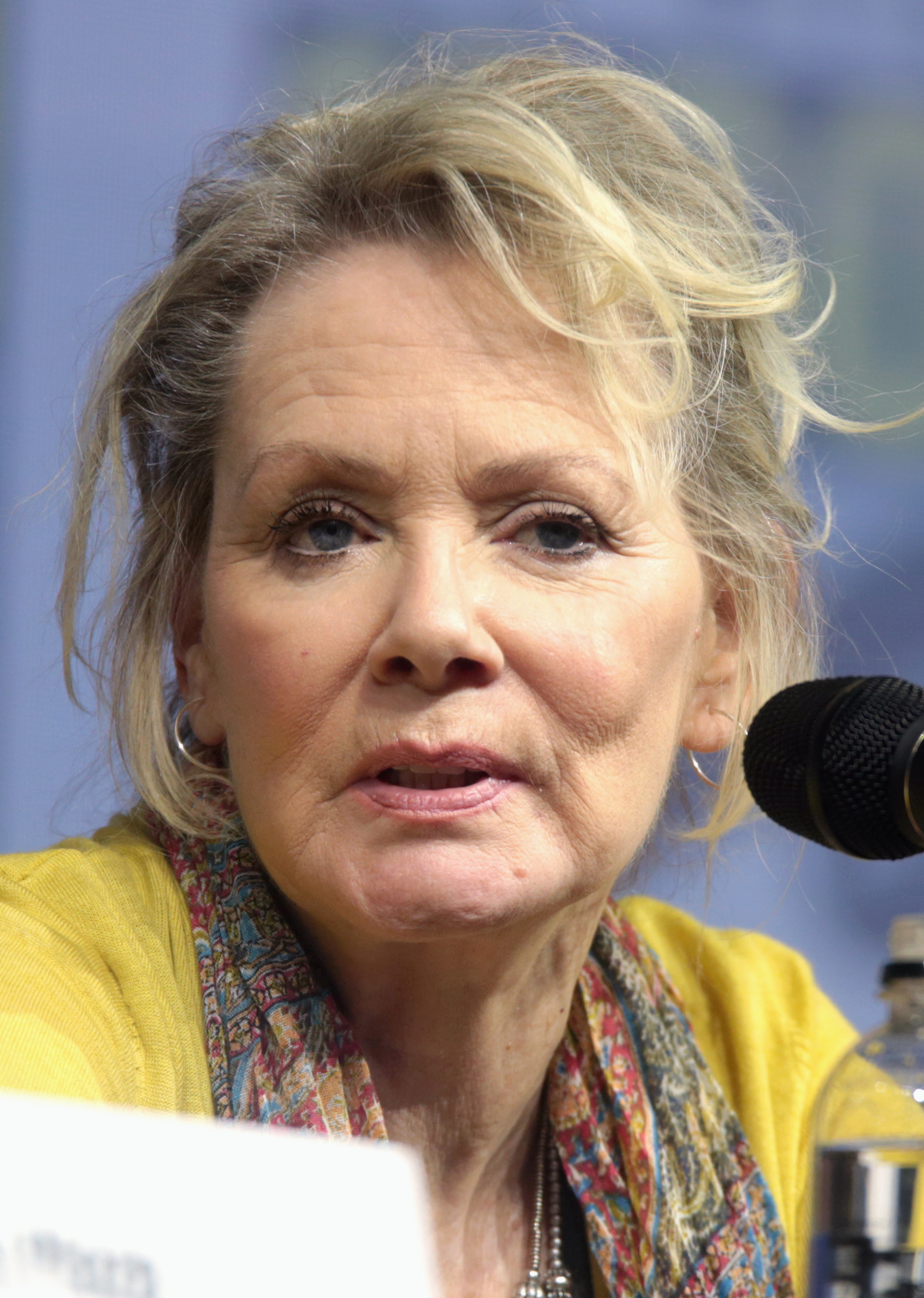
Jean Smart, Best Actress in a Television Series – Musical or Comedy winner

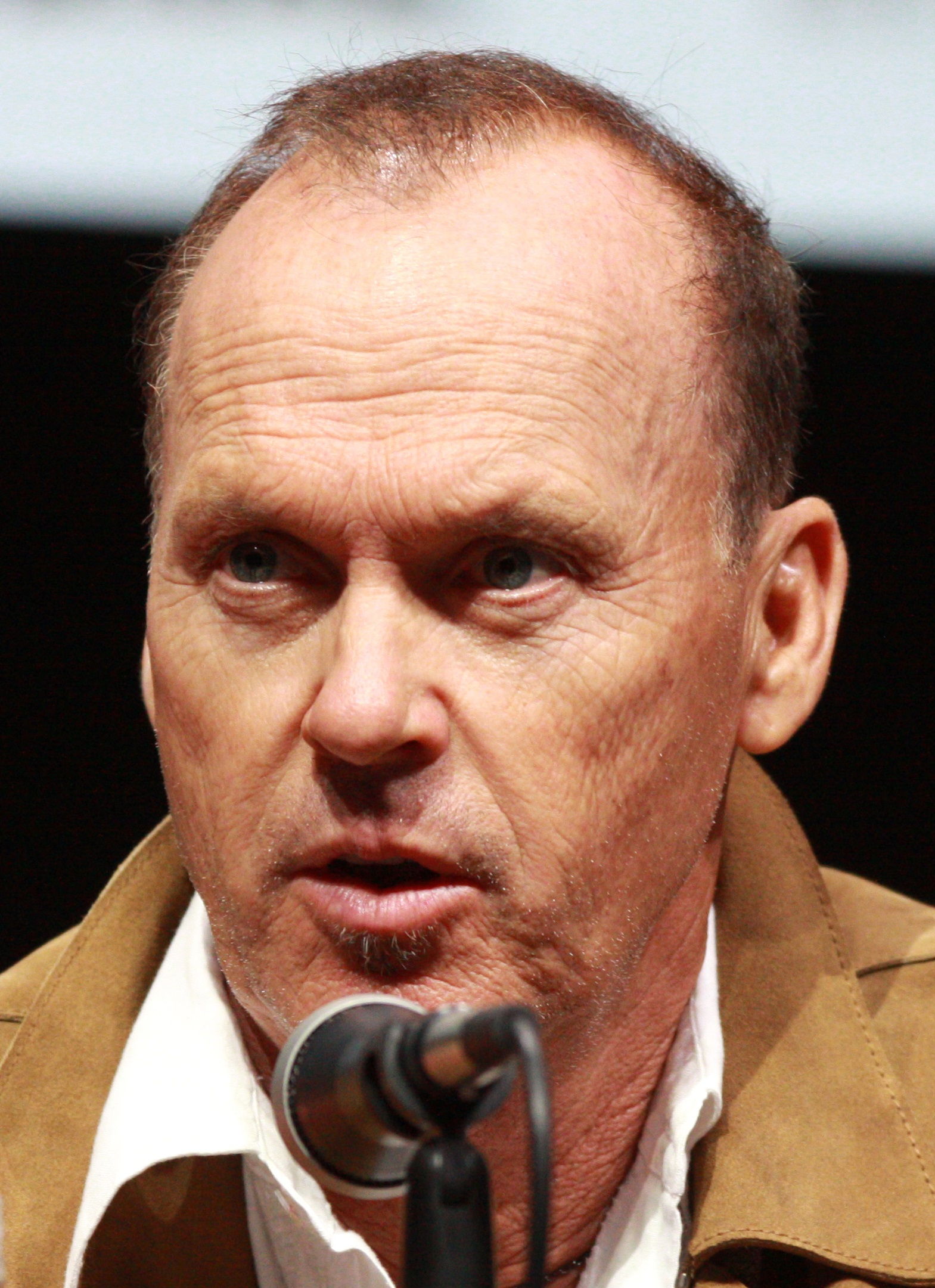
Michael Keaton, Best Actor in a Miniseries or Television Film winner

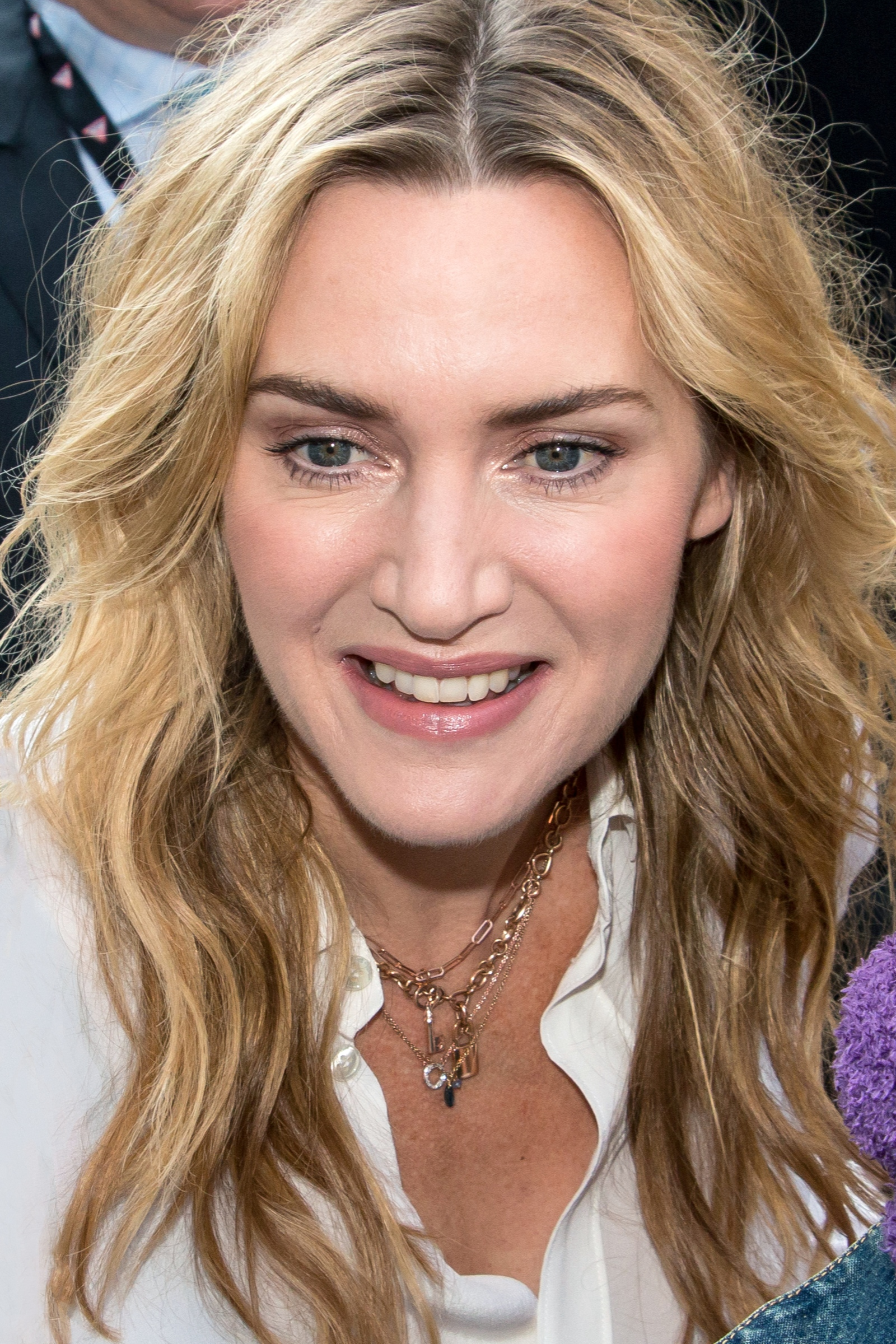
Kate Winslet, Best Actress in a Miniseries or Television Film winner

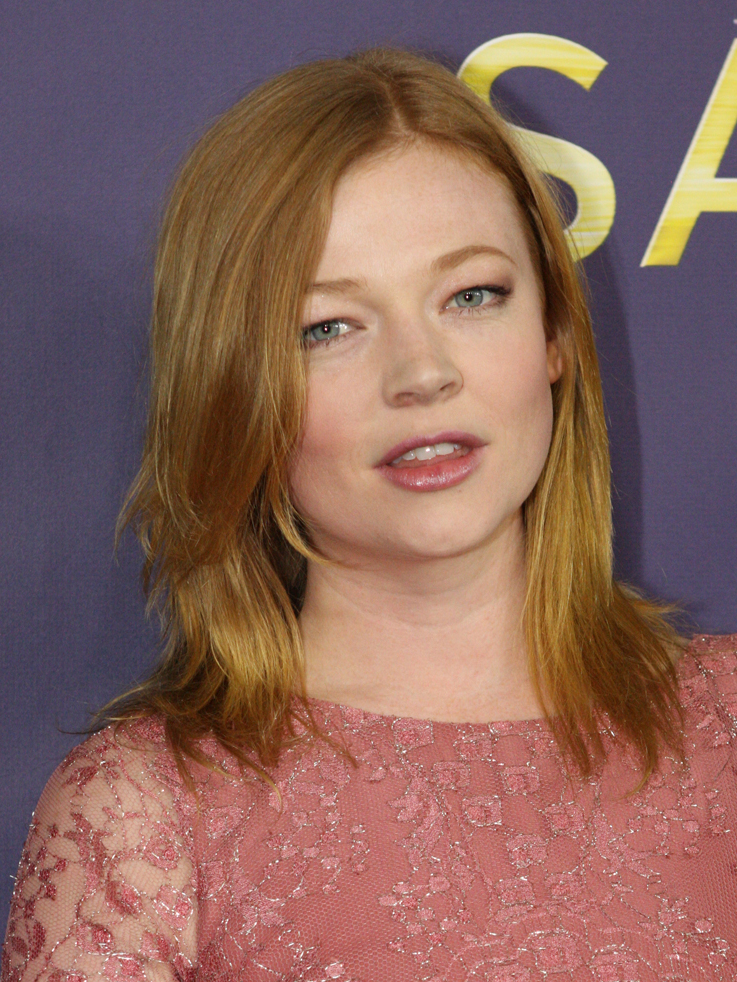
Sarah Snook, Best Supporting Actress in a Series, Miniseries, or Television Film winner

For her role as Blanca Evangelista in Pose, Michaela Jaé Rodriguez became the first transgender person to win a Golden Globe Award, winning Best Actress – Television Series Drama. West Side Story star Rachel Zegler was the first actress of Colombian descent to win Best Actress – Motion Picture Musical or Comedy and, at 20 years old, the youngest in the category. Zegler was also one of the first people born in the 21st century to win a Golden Globe, alongside Billie Eilish (also 20 years old), who won Best Original Song for the title song from No Time to Die. For his role as Oh Il-nam in Squid Game, O Yeong-su became the first South Korean actor to win an acting award, winnnig Best Supporting Actor – Series, Miniseries or Television Film.

=== Film ===
Best Motion Picture
Drama	Musical or Comedy
The Power of the Dog; Belfast; CODA; Dune; King Richard	West Side Story; Cyrano; Don't Look Up; Licorice Pizza; tick, tick... BOOM!
Best Performance in a Motion Picture – Drama
Actor	Actress
Will Smith – King Richard as Richard Williams; Mahershala Ali – Swan Song as Cameron / Jack; Javier Bardem – Being the Ricardos as Desi Arnaz; Benedict Cumberbatch – The Power of the Dog as Phil Burbank; Denzel Washington – The Tragedy of Macbeth as Lord Macbeth	Nicole Kidman – Being the Ricardos as Lucille Ball; Jessica Chastain – The Eyes of Tammy Faye as Tammy Faye Bakker; Olivia Colman – The Lost Daughter as Leda Caruso; Lady Gaga – House of Gucci as Patrizia Reggiani; Kristen Stewart – Spencer as Diana Spencer
Best Performance in a Motion Picture – Musical or Comedy
Actor	Actress
Andrew Garfield – tick, tick... BOOM! as Jonathan Larson; Leonardo DiCaprio – Don't Look Up as Dr. Randall Mindy; Peter Dinklage – Cyrano as Cyrano de Bergerac; Cooper Hoffman – Licorice Pizza as Gary Valentine; Anthony Ramos – In the Heights as Usnavi de la Vega	Rachel Zegler – West Side Story as María; Marion Cotillard – Annette as Ann Defrasnoux; Alana Haim – Licorice Pizza as Alana Kane; Jennifer Lawrence – Don't Look Up as Kate Dibiasky; Emma Stone – Cruella as Estella / Cruella de Vil
Best Supporting Performance in a Motion Picture
Supporting Actor	Supporting Actress
Kodi Smit-McPhee – The Power of the Dog as Peter Gordon; Ben Affleck – The Tender Bar as Charlie Maguire; Jamie Dornan – Belfast as Pa; Ciarán Hinds – Belfast as Pop; Troy Kotsur – CODA as Frank Rossi	Ariana DeBose – West Side Story as Anita; Caitríona Balfe – Belfast as Ma; Kirsten Dunst – The Power of the Dog as Rose Gordon; Aunjanue Ellis-Taylor – King Richard as Oracene "Brandy" Price; Ruth Negga – Passing as Clare Bellew
Other
Best Director	Best Screenplay
Jane Campion – The Power of the Dog; Kenneth Branagh – Belfast; Maggie Gyllenhaal – The Lost Daughter; Steven Spielberg – West Side Story; Denis Villeneuve – Dune	Kenneth Branagh – Belfast; Paul Thomas Anderson – Licorice Pizza; Jane Campion – The Power of the Dog; Adam McKay – Don't Look Up; Aaron Sorkin – Being the Ricardos
Best Original Score	Best Original Song
Hans Zimmer – Dune; Alexandre Desplat – The French Dispatch; Germaine Franco – Encanto; Jonny Greenwood – The Power of the Dog; Alberto Iglesias – Parallel Mothers	"No Time to Die" (Billie Eilish and Finneas O'Connell) – No Time to Die; "Be Alive" (Beyoncé and DIXSON) – King Richard; "Dos Oruguitas" (Lin-Manuel Miranda) – Encanto; "Down to Joy" (Van Morrison) – Belfast; "Here I Am (Singing My Way Home)" (Jamie Hartman, Jennifer Hudson, and Carole King) – Respect
Best Animated Feature	Best Non-English Language Film
Encanto; Flee; Luca; My Sunny Maad; Raya and the Last Dragon	Drive My Car (Japan); Compartment No. 6 (Finland); The Hand of God (Italy); A Hero (Iran); Parallel Mothers (Spain)

=== Films with multiple nominations ===
The following films received multiple nominations:

Nominations	Films
7	Belfast
7	The Power of the Dog
4	Don't Look Up
4	King Richard
4	Licorice Pizza
4	West Side Story
3	Being the Ricardos
3	Dune
3	Encanto
2	CODA
2	Cyrano
2	The Lost Daughter
2	Parallel Mothers
2	tick, tick... BOOM!

=== Films with multiple wins ===
The following films received multiple wins:

Wins	Films
3	The Power of the Dog
3	West Side Story

=== Television ===
Best Television Series
Drama	Musical or Comedy
Succession (HBO); Lupin (Netflix); The Morning Show (Apple TV+); Pose (FX); Squid Game (Netflix)	Hacks (HBO Max); The Great (Hulu); Only Murders in the Building (Hulu); Reservation Dogs (FX on Hulu); Ted Lasso (Apple TV+)
Best Miniseries or Television Film
The Underground Railroad (Prime Video); Dopesick (Hulu); Impeachment: American Crime Story (FX); Maid (Netflix); Mare of Easttown (HBO)
Best Performance in a Television Series – Drama
Actor	Actress
Jeremy Strong – Succession (HBO) as Kendall Roy; Brian Cox – Succession (HBO) as Logan Roy; Lee Jung-jae – Squid Game (Netflix) as Seong Gi-hun; Billy Porter – Pose (FX) as Prayerful "Pray" Tell; Omar Sy – Lupin (Netflix) as Assane Diop	Michaela Jaé Rodriguez – Pose (FX) as Blanca Rodriguez-Evangelista; Uzo Aduba – In Treatment (HBO) as Dr. Brooke Taylor; Jennifer Aniston – The Morning Show (Apple TV+) as Alex Levy; Christine Baranski – The Good Fight (Paramount+) as Diane Lockhart; Elisabeth Moss – The Handmaid's Tale (Hulu) as June Osborne / Offred
Best Performance in a Television Series – Musical or Comedy
Actor	Actress
Jason Sudeikis – Ted Lasso (Apple TV+) as Ted Lasso; Anthony Anderson – Black-ish (ABC) as Andre "Dre" Johnson, Sr.; Nicholas Hoult – The Great (Hulu) as Peter III of Russia / Pugachev; Steve Martin – Only Murders in the Building (Hulu) as Charles-Haden Savage; Martin Short – Only Murders in the Building (Hulu) as Oliver Putnam	Jean Smart – Hacks (HBO Max) as Deborah Vance; Hannah Einbinder – Hacks (HBO Max) as Ava Daniels; Elle Fanning – The Great (Hulu) as Catherine the Great; Issa Rae – Insecure (HBO) as Issa Dee; Tracee Ellis Ross – Black-ish (ABC) as Dr. Rainbow "Bow" Johnson
Best Performance in a Miniseries or Television Film
Actor	Actress
Michael Keaton – Dopesick (Hulu) as Dr. Samuel Finnix; Paul Bettany – WandaVision (Disney+) as Vision; Oscar Isaac – Scenes from a Marriage (HBO) as Jonathan Levy; Ewan McGregor – Halston (Netflix) as Halston; Tahar Rahim – The Serpent (Netflix) as Charles Sobhraj	Kate Winslet – Mare of Easttown (HBO) as Marianne "Mare" Sheehan; Jessica Chastain – Scenes from a Marriage (HBO) as Mira Phillips; Cynthia Erivo – Genius: Aretha (National Geographic) as Aretha Franklin; Elizabeth Olsen – WandaVision (Disney+) as Wanda Maximoff / Scarlet Witch; Margaret Qualley – Maid (Netflix) as Alexandra "Alex" Russell
Best Supporting Performance in a Series, Miniseries or Television Film
Supporting Actor	Supporting Actress
O Yeong-su – Squid Game (Netflix) as Oh Il-nam; Billy Crudup – The Morning Show (Apple TV+) as Cory Ellison; Kieran Culkin – Succession (HBO) as Roman Roy; Mark Duplass – The Morning Show (Apple TV+) as Charlie "Chip" Black; Brett Goldstein – Ted Lasso (Apple TV+) as Roy Kent	Sarah Snook – Succession (HBO) as Siobhan "Shiv" Roy; Jennifer Coolidge – The White Lotus (HBO) as Tanya McQuoid; Kaitlyn Dever – Dopesick (Hulu) as Betsy Mallum; Andie MacDowell – Maid (Netflix) as Paula; Hannah Waddingham – Ted Lasso (Apple TV+) as Rebecca Welton

=== Series with multiple nominations ===
The following television series received multiple nominations:

Nominations	Series
5	Succession
4	The Morning Show
4	Ted Lasso
3	Dopesick
3	The Great
3	Hacks
3	Maid
3	Only Murders in the Building
3	Pose
3	Squid Game
2	Black-ish
2	Lupin
2	Mare of Easttown
2	Scenes from a Marriage
2	WandaVision

=== Series with multiple wins ===
The following series received multiple wins:

Wins	Series
3	Succession
2	Hacks
