= George and Willie Muse =

Kidnapped American albino brothers

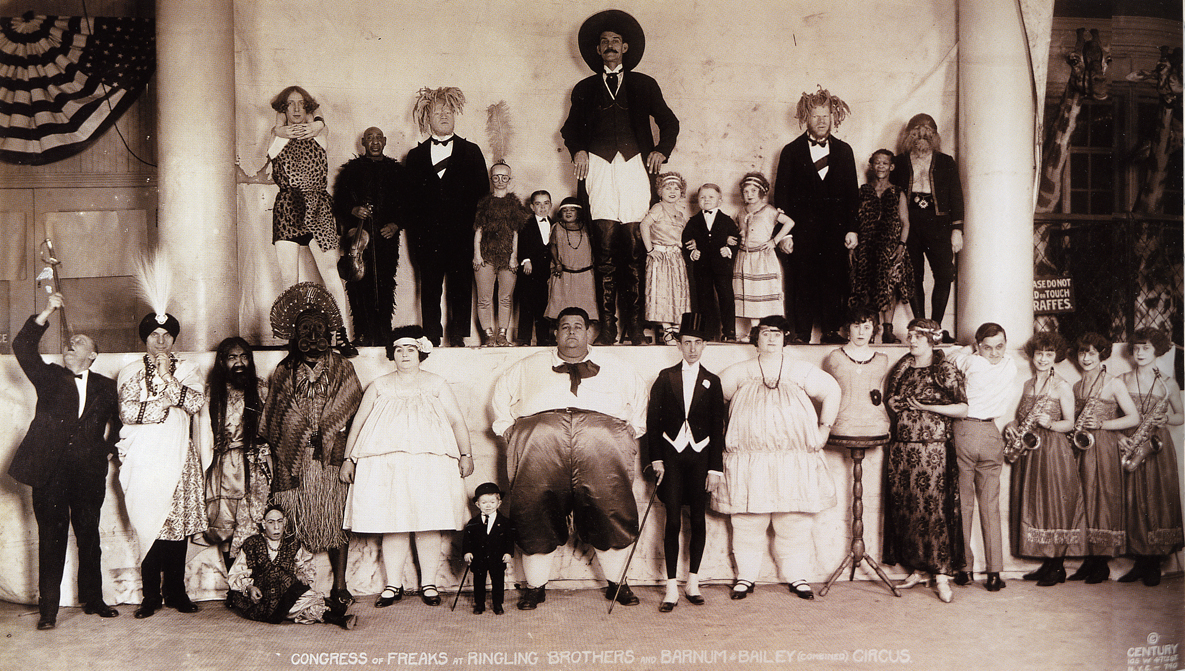
- The Muse Brothers and other "freaks" displayed at the Ringling Brothers Circus.
- Born: Truevine, Virginia, United States

George and Willie Muse were a pair of African American brothers from Truevine, Virginia, who were abducted as children in 1899 and exploited as sideshow performers due to their albinism. They were exhibited in traveling circuses for several decades under fabricated identities and sensationalized with dehumanized presentations.

The brothers story was adapted into the non-fiction book Truevine.

== Early life ==
Both brothers were born in the early 1890s in Truevine, Virginia, George and Willie Muse were the sons of Harriett and Cabell Muse, who were both descendants of former slaves. Both brothers were born with albinism, a genetic disorder characterized by a lack of pigmentation in the skin, hair, and eyes, leading to pale skin and sensitivity to sunlight. They were both nearly blind, but also suffered from nystagmus, a condition causing involuntary eye movement and impaired vision. Their pale blue eyes and pale skinned appearance made them stand out in their rural community, where they toiled from an early age in the tobacco fields.

In 1899, when Willie was nine and George was just six years old, their mother made a contract for her boys to tour with the Stokes carnival.

== Abduction ==
In 1914 they were discovered by a "freak-hunter" called James Herman "Candy" Shelton. Shelton had been hunting for "freaks" to exhibit in travelling circus freak shows. He was eager to find humans with unusual conditions, such as dwarfism or conjoined twins as he believed they would make him a lot of money. Consequently the Muse brothers were both abducted by offering them a contract in which they were able to keep their wages.

== Exploitation ==
After the Muse brothers were abducted James Herman "Candy" Shelton would take on the role of their manager. He managed the brothers as they toured across the United States as part of various circuses, including the Al G. Barnes Circus and Ringling Brothers Circus. Some of the funds raised from this were used to pay for the brothers’ lodging and clothing, however the mother was not paid wages. The brothers were cruelly exploited and portrayed often as savages and cannibals. They were also often dehumanized such as being said to be aliens from Mars and even portrayed to have been descended from monkeys from the dark continent. Shelton also lied to both George and Willie, telling them that their mother had died in order to prevent them from trying to contact her.

The brothers were also used as case studies for the US eugenics movement where a picture of them was displayed within the book titled "You and Heredity". The author of the book Amram Scheinfeld would go on to point out the brothers’ albinism, nystagmus and teeth defects.

== Later life ==
In 1927, the Ringling Brothers Circus passed through Roanoke. Their mother, Harriet Muse, interrupted a performance and confronted circus proprietors and city cops. During this interruption she was reunited with her sons, who had been missing for 13 years. Three days later Harriet would begin legal proceedings to try and recover her sons wages and to hold the Ringling Brothers and her sons abductor James Herman "Candy" Shelton accountable. Harriet's lawyer argued that the brothers had been turned into slaves, which led to a settlement where the mother agreed to return her sons to their abductor, on the condition that their wages were paid to her, and that the circus would also hire their younger brother Tom, who also exhibited albinism.

George died in 1971 at the age of 80 years old, while Willie died in 2001 aged 108.

== Family ==
The Muse brothers' parents were Cabell Muse and Harriet Muse, who were both descendants of former slaves. After the kidnapping of the brothers, their mother would go on to have three more children named Tom, Annie Belle and Harrison. All five of the mother's children were born with albinism. Multiple other members of the Muse family also exhibited albinism including uncles and a niece.

== See also ==
- List of kidnappings before 1900
