= Petrus Kafiar =

Papuan evangelist

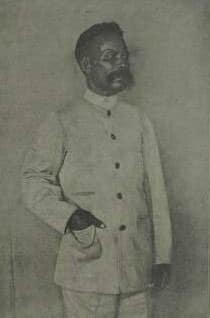
- Born: 1864 or 1873; Supiori Island
- Died: 1926; Supiori Island
- Occupations: Preacher; Christian missionary

Petrus Kafiar (died 1926) was an evangelist active on Irian Jaya.

== Background ==
The son of a headman, Kafiar was a native of Supiori Island; his date of birth has been given variously as 1864 and c. 1873. When he was seven years old he was kidnapped during a raid, and was sold for fifty florins to a Moluccan carpenter, a Christian, and his wife; an Indonesian missionary couple at Mansinam paid to ensure his liberation. He received his baptism in 1887.

In 1892 he and another Papuan, Timotheus Awendu, were sent under the auspices of the Mansinam mission to attend the Depok Seminary to study for missionary work. Kafiar became a teacher-preacher, serving in various locations before returning in 1908 to the village of his birth. He went on to become a pioneer of missionary work in Biak. He was fluent in both Dutch and Malay, which added to his appeal among the Biaks, who came to be seen as the most successful of those groups Christianized under the Dutch.

== See also ==
- List of kidnappings before 1900
- Lists of solved missing person cases
