= Diversion Investigator =

Diversion Investigator (DI) is the title of a specialist position within the Drug Enforcement Administration (DEA) of the United States Department of Justice. DIs are responsible for addressing the problem of diversion of controlled pharmaceuticals and regulated chemicals from the legitimate channels in which they are manufactured, distributed, and dispensed. They primarily inspect or investigate medical practitioners and staff; pharmacies; and companies involved in manufacturing, distributing, importing, and exporting controlled substances.

The mission of a DI is to aid the U.S. pharmaceutical and chemical industries in complying with the Federal Controlled Substances Act (CSA) and other pertinent laws, as well as international treaties and conventions. DIs conduct investigations to uncover and investigate suspected sources of diversion and take appropriate criminal, civil and/or administrative actions. Most DIs are part of DEA's Diversion Control Program and are assigned to various DEA field offices throughout the U.S. and in several foreign countries.

The DI position was originally known as a "Compliance Investigator" and was created to address the regulatory responsibilities of the Bureau of Narcotics and Dangerous Drugs (BNDD) following the enactment of the CSA in 1970. Around 1983–84, the position had been given its current name. One key difference between the DI position and that of a DEA Special Agent is that DEA has never authorized DIs (or their Compliance Investigator predecessors) to carry firearms or to perform traditional law enforcement activities such as making arrests or controlling informants. DEA Special Agents, on the other hand, are fully commissioned Federal law enforcement officers. From 1971 to 1995, DIs were classified as series 1810 (general investigator) within the U.S. civil service system. In other Federal agencies, series 1810 investigators performed administrative investigative functions such as background investigations for security clearances (Office of Personnel Management and the Defense Security Service) or investigations of equal employment opportunity violations (Equal Employment Opportunity Commission). In 1995, DEA reclassified DIs to series 1801 (general inspection, investigation, enforcement, and compliance) to reflect the position's mixture of criminal, civil, and administrative investigative duties.

In order to accomplish their mission, DIs employ a wide range of investigative activities. One such activity is the scheduled regulatory investigation (or audit) of registered handlers of controlled substances. These investigations serve to deter diversion through evaluation of the registrants' record-keeping procedures, security safeguards and general compliance with the CSA and implementing regulations. Legitimate handlers of controlled substances subject to regulatory investigation include drug manufacturers, distributors (wholesalers), importers and exporters, and narcotic treatment programs, which are those programs primarily designed to furnish methadone to narcotic addicts as part of a program of addiction treatment.

Most recently, there has been a growing push to investigate diversion of controlled substances involving sale and distribution via the Internet. The rapidly changing environment and an increase in Internet diversion of controlled substances has created a need for programs to target these sources of diversion.

Frequently, DIs are involved in investigations aimed at the most serious practitioner-level registrant violators (e.g., medical practitioners, pharmacies, etc.) of controlled substances laws and regulations. These registrants have a documented or suspected history of diversion of drugs/chemicals into the illicit market. DIs collect and analyze information developed during their investigations and consult with supervisory personnel to determine if criminal prosecution is warranted. DIs work closely with DEA Special Agents and state and local law enforcement officers who provide assistance in making undercover purchases and executing search warrants. DIs also work closely with attorneys for DEA, the United States Attorneys Office and state and local prosecutors. DIs are required to testify as to the results of their investigations during criminal trials, grand jury proceedings and administrative hearings.

A key function of the DI position involves maintaining liaison with all levels of the U.S. drug and chemical registrant population, including the pharmaceutical and chemical industries. DIs will often answer questions registrants have concerning their responsibilities under the CSA. Many DIs also become involved in their field office's demand reduction and community out-reach programs.

Foreign-based DIs are experts in legal and regulatory matters pertaining to narcotics, psychotropic substances, and regulated chemicals. They serve as advisers/consultants to foreign host governments in establishing anti-diversion programs.
