= Beth Macy =

American journalist and writer

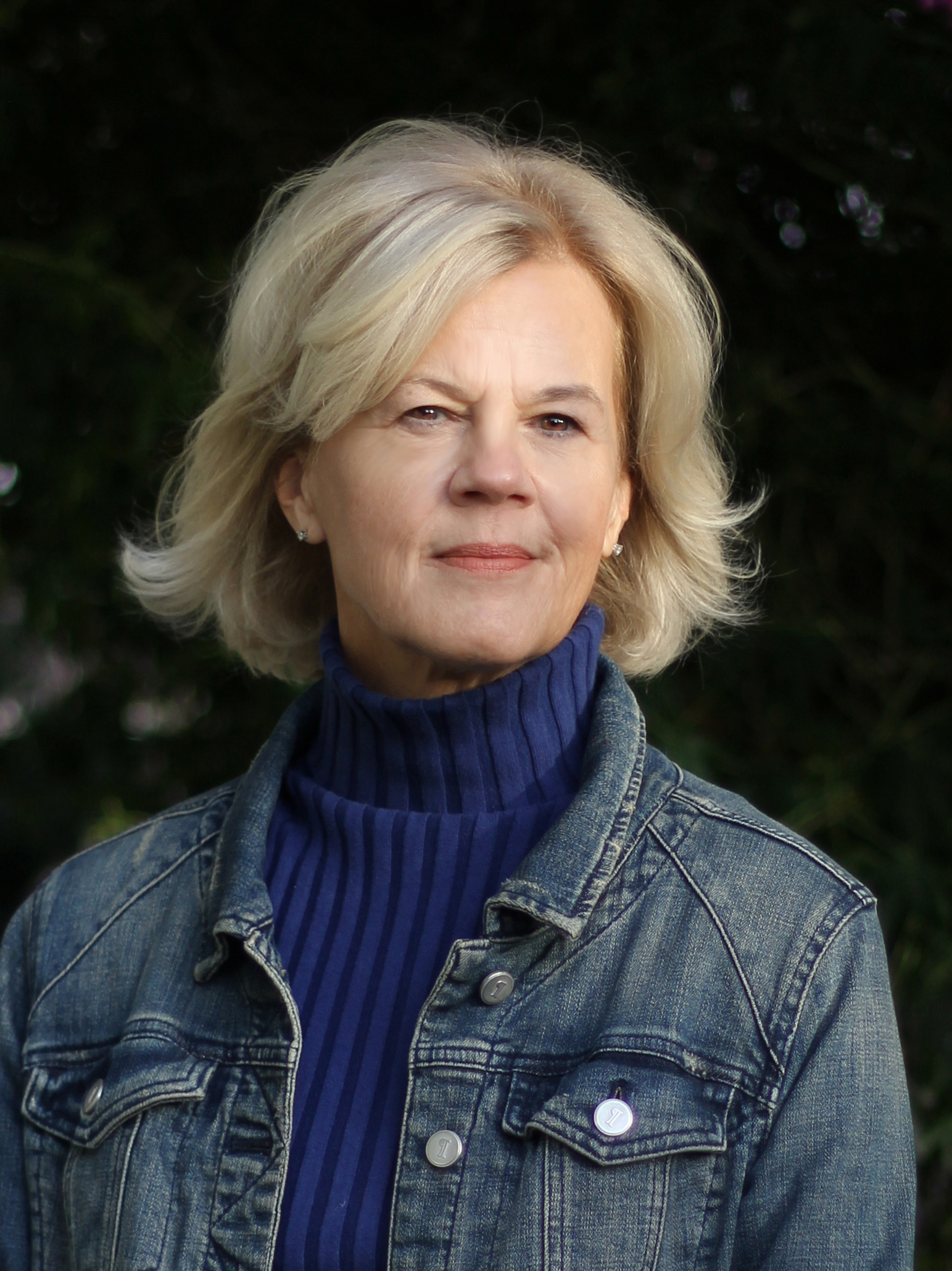
- Macy in 2024
- Born: c. 1964 (age 61–62); Urbana, Ohio, U.S.
- Education: Bowling Green State University (BS); Hollins University (MA)
- Political party: Democratic
- Spouse: Tom Landon
- Children: 2
- Writing career
- Years active: 1989–present
- Notable works: Truevine (2016); Dopesick (2018); Paper Girl (2025)
- Website: Official website

Beth Macy (born c. 1964) is an American journalist and non-fiction writer. She is the author of five books including the four national bestsellers Factory Man (2014), Truevine (2016), Dopesick (2018) and Paper Girl (2025). Macy is a Democratic candidate for Virginia's 6th congressional district in 2026.

== Early life ==
The daughter of a factory worker, Sarah Macy Slack, and a housepainter father, Macy grew up in Urbana, Ohio. She was the first in her family to attend college, receiving a bachelor's degree in journalism from Bowling Green State University in Bowling Green, Ohio, in 1986. In 1993, she earned a master's degree in creative writing from Hollins University in Hollins, Virginia.

== Career ==
Macy was a reporter for The Roanoke Times in Roanoke, Virginia, from 1989 to 2014. She writes essays and op-eds, including for The New York Times, in addition to writing for magazines. In 2010, she was awarded the Nieman Fellowship for Journalism by Harvard University in Cambridge, Massachusetts. In 2023, she was named a Guggenheim Fellow for General Non-Fiction.

In June 2020, Macy was an executive producer and co-writer for an eight episode Hulu series based on her 2018 book, Dopesick: Dealers, Doctors and the Drug Company that Addicted America. Dopesick tells the story of America's opioid crisis and the deadly role played by members of the Sackler family, the former owners of Purdue Pharma. The series was developed by Danny Strong and stars Michael Keaton.

In 2020, Macy wrote a follow up to Dopesick titled Raising Lazarus: Hope, Justice, and the Future of America's Overdose Crisis. It documents heroic efforts by grassroots activists and families to combat addiction and resistance to scientifically valid treatment methods.

In her latest book, Paper Girl: A Memoir of Home and Family in a Fractured America, Macy returns to her hometown of Urbana, Ohio, to document the changes there resulting from globalization, addiction, and a divided America.

== Awards ==
Macy won numerous national honors for reporting on race, immigrants and refugees, caregiving for the elderly, and teen pregnancy during her more than 20 years as a reporter at The Roanoke Times. She has received an Associated Press Managing Editors award, the Casey Medal for Meritorious Journalism, and an award from the Society for Advancing Business Editing and Writing.

Factory Man: How One Furniture Maker Battled Offshoring, Stayed Local—and Helped Save an American Town received the J. Anthony Lukas Work-in-Progress Award in 2013.

Dopesick was shortlisted for the 2019 Andrew Carnegie Medal for Excellence in Nonfiction.

In 2022, Macy and Strong won the USC Scripter Award for an episode in the Dopesick Hulu series, "The People vs Purdue Pharma."

Paper Girl was a finalist for the 2025 National Book Critics Circle Award for Autobiography.

== 2026 U.S. House of Representatives campaign ==
On November 18, 2025, Macy announced her candidacy for the U.S. House of Representatives in Virginia's 6th congressional district as a Democrat in the 2026 midterm elections.

== Personal life ==
Macy lives in Roanoke, Virginia, with her husband, Tom Landon. They have two adult children.

== Works ==
- Factory Man: How One Furniture Maker Battled Offshoring, Stayed Local—and Helped Save an American Town; (2014, Little Brown & Co.; ISBN 9780316231435; OCLC 1003808101)
- Truevine: Two Brothers, a Kidnapping, and a Mother's Quest: A True Story of the Jim Crow South; (2016, Little, Brown & Co.; ISBN 9780316337540; OCLC 971462415)
- Dopesick: Dealers, Doctors, and the Drug Company That Addicted America; (2018, Little, Brown & Co.; ISBN 9780316551243; OCLC 1043454094)
- Finding Tess: A Mother's Search for Answers in a Dopesick America; (2019 Audible Original Audiobook; ASIN B07T2NSXHY)
- Raising Lazarus: Hope, Justice, and the Future of America's Overdose Crisis; (2022, Little Brown & Co.; ISBN 978-0316430227; OCLC 1288140355)
- Paper Girl: A Memoir of Home and Family in a Fractured America; (2025, Penguin Random House; ISBN 978-0-593-65673-0
