= Clifton Star Chamber Case =

1601 court case in England

Henry Clifton v. Robinson
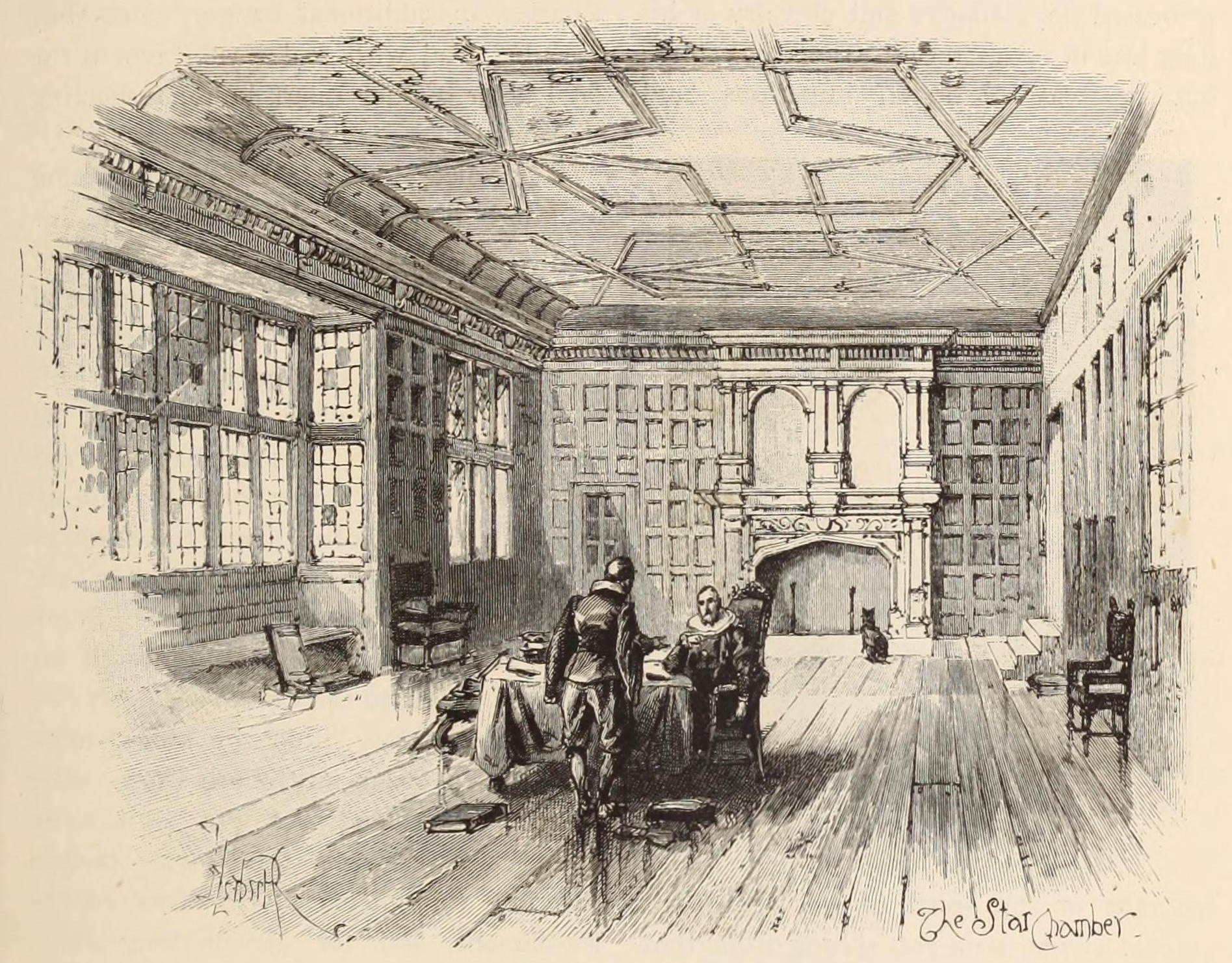
- Court: Star Chamber
- Full case name: Henry Clifton vs. The Blackfriars Company (Robinson, Gyles & Evans)
- Decided: 1601

Case history
- Subsequent action: none

Keywords
- Forced drama; Early English Choir Schools; Sexualisation; Children

The Clifton Star Chamber Case or Clifton vs. Robinson was a court case of early modern England, in 1601, before the Star Chamber, concerning the abduction of children by choir schools.

== The case ==
In 1601, Henry Clifton, a nobleman from Norfolk, sued the Blackfriars company (headed by Gyles, Robinson, and Evans) for their abduction of his son Thomas, on 13 December 1600. Clifton obtained a warrant from Sir John Fortescue, who granted it using his authority as a member of the Privy Council due to his connections and high social status. The basis for the case was not that Thomas was forcibly impressed into the choir school (which was entirely legal) but that he was made to act in the plays of Children of the Chapel.

=== Ostensible consequence ===
In 1606, possibly as a result of this case, the royal patent allowing the Master of the Children of the Chapel Royal to impress children into service was revised to stipulate that choristers who had been forcibly impressed would not be "used or employed as Comedians or Stage players."

== Importance of the case ==
The Clifton case is one of the only surviving objection records to the common practice of forcibly impressing boys into (ecclesiastical) choir schools in medieval and early modern England. It is notable that the objection is to the child's involvement in the controversial children's theatre companies of the period. Forcible impressment was royally condoned as seen in letters from Elizabeth I on 15 July 1597 for the Master of the Children of the Chapel. The prevalence is evidenced by documents such as an authorization for the Chapel Royal in 1420 and An Ordinance of the Lordes and Commons Assembled in Parliament, for the Apprehending and Bringing to Condigne Punishment, All Such Lewd Persons as Shall Steale, Sell, Buy, Inveigle, Purloune, Convey, or Receive Any Little Children (9 May 1644). Others such as Salmon Pavey, Avery Trussell, John Chappell, Nathan Field, John Motteram, Philip Pykman, and Thomas Grymes are known such impressees.
