= Dopesick (book) =

2018 nonfiction book by Beth Macy

Dopesick: Dealers, Doctors, and the Drug Company that Addicted America
- First edition
- Author: Beth Macy
- Language: English
- Genre: Narrative nonfiction
- Publisher: Little, Brown and Company
- Publication date: 2018
- Publication place: United States
- Media type: Print, e-book
- Pages: 384 pages
- ISBN: 0316551244

Dopesick: Dealers, Doctors, and the Drug Company that Addicted America is a 2018 non-fiction book by American author Beth Macy. The book covers the origin and evolution of the opioid epidemic in the United States beginning primarily with the 1996 release of the drug OxyContin, and examines its effects on small town America and the Appalachian region in particular. It was well received by critics and won the Los Angeles Times Book Prize for Science and Technology. In 2021, the book was adapted into a Hulu miniseries starring Michael Keaton.

== Background ==
Author Beth Macy worked as a journalist for the Roanoke, Virginia–based newspaper The Roanoke Times from 1989 until 2014. In 2012, following the completion of her first book, Factory Man, Macy was assigned a story by the newspaper to report on a local teen who had died of a heroin overdose. Macy's subsequent reporting on the topic prompted her to suggest heroin and opioid abuse as the subject of her next book. Her New York City–based publishers, having already seen a heroin epidemic in their city, didn't see the topic's novelty, and Macy ended up writing Truevine as her second book instead. The 2015 publication of the opioid study Dreamland by Sam Quinones, combined with further research into the effect of the drugs on America, brought the issue further into the public consciousness, and Macy began writing Dopesick soon after.

== Synopsis ==
Dopesick combines an overview of the history of opioid prescription and abuse in the United States with interviews and anecdotes from people whose lives the drugs have affected. The book goes back to the Civil War and the widescale distribution of morphine to wounded soldiers, followed later by Bayer's marketing of heroin as safe and effective, in displaying the history of careless treatment of opiates by many in the medical and pharmaceutical fields. Macy traces the more recent epidemic to Purdue Pharma and their 1996 release of the opioid painkiller OxyContin.

Purdue was successful in having the drug approved for less serious ailments than opiates were typically prescribed due to the company's claim that its extended release (the "-Contin" in its name being short for "continuous") made it safe from recreational users and addicts seeking a quick fix. In reality, users quickly learned that removing the pill's outer layer allowed access to the concentrated narcotic located inside. This discovery resulted in drug dealers taking advantage of the medical field's readiness to prescribe OxyContin to create "pill mills", the effects of which were felt hardest in rural America.

The book goes on to describe personal stories from affected people and families in the Appalachian region. Many people who had been prescribed opiates had become addicted but could no longer afford to pay for the pills. They often turned to heroin, which was being imported into rural areas on an unprecedented scale. Teens who had tried pills embraced heroin as an easily obtained alternative, with one remarking, "I did my first bag of heroin before I drank my first bottle of beer." The widespread use of opioids also introduced new demographics to heroin dealers in the form of women and people with more disposable income.

Finally, the book examines the science behind medication-assisted treatment, which involves the monitored use of an opiate-derived medicine to combat addiction. Macy interviewed Nora Volkow, the director of the National Institute on Drug Abuse, who remarked that "[a]ll studies – every single one of them – show superior outcomes when patients are treated" with buprenorphine and other maintenance medications. Macy describes resistance to such treatment, much of which was found in the South where communities had been hit hardest by the epidemic but still believed in a "cold turkey" approach to recovery.

== Reception ==
Dopesick received generally positive reviews. Jessica Bruder of The New York Times Book Review called it a "harrowing, deeply compassionate...masterwork of narrative journalism." Janet Maslin of The New York Times said that "no matter what you already know about the opioid crisis, [Dopesick's] toughness and intimacy make it a must." Entertainment Weekly's David Canfield called Macy a "terrific reporter" and said Dopesick was a "definitive attempt at confronting the epidemic, from its source to its current scale." Brian Volck of The Christian Century praised the book's thoroughness but likened its portrayal of so many affected people and their heartbreaking stories to a "mass of indistinguishable misery like characters in a 19th-century Russian novel."

Dopesick was named one of the 100 Notable Books of 2018 by The New York Times Book Review and made the 2018 year-end "best-of" lists of The Washington Post, Chicago Tribune, and Amazon. It was a New York Times best seller and received the 2018 Los Angeles Times Book Prize for Science and Technology.

== Adaptation ==
In 2020, it was announced that the streaming service Hulu was adapting Dopesick for an eight-episode limited series. Michael Keaton was signed to star in the series, which would be led by showrunner Danny Strong and director Barry Levinson. Macy, who was an executive producer and co-wrote some episodes, succeeded in her attempt at having the series filmed in Virginia where much of the book took place. She was also an advocate for the show's inclusion of the benefits of medication-assisted treatment, which Patrick Radden Keefe said was "hugely important" in helping the American viewing public begin to talk about such measures in combating the epidemic.

The show premiered in October 2021. It received critical acclaim and was nominated for 14 Primetime Emmy Awards, with Keaton winning for Outstanding Lead Actor in a Limited or Anthology Series or Movie. It also received a 2021 Peabody Award in the entertainment category.
