= Truevine =

2016 non-fiction book by Beth Macy

Truevine: Two Brothers, a Kidnapping, and a Mother's Quest: A True Story of the Jim Crow South
- First edition
- Author: Beth Macy
- Language: English
- Genre: Non-fiction
- Publisher: Little, Brown and Company
- Publication date: 2016
- Publication place: United States
- Media type: Print, e-book
- Pages: 432 pages
- ISBN: 0316337544

Truevine: Two Brothers, a Kidnapping, and a Mother's Quest: A True Story of the Jim Crow South is a 2016 non-fiction book by American author Beth Macy. The book tells the story of George and Willie Muse, two African-American brothers who were kidnapped and forced to perform as sideshow attractions because they were albinos. Truevine was released on October 18, 2016 through Little, Brown and Company.

in 2016, film rights for the book were being negotiated by Paramount Pictures and Appian Way Productions.

== Synopsis ==
George and Willie Muse were two brothers who grew up in Truevine, part of a sharecropping family that lived in a tobacco farming community near Roanoke, Virginia. The two brothers were both albinos, a feature that Willie claimed prompted a circus man to abduct the two children in 1899 while they worked in a field. In the book, Macy notes that it was possible that the children were sent to the circus by their mother, as their albino skin made it unlikely that they would survive long as sharecroppers, but that "if you ask me in my heart, I'm gonna go with [Willie Muse's] story". They performed for years as sideshow attractions where they were cruelly exploited and frequently portrayed as savages from another country or Martians. George and Willie were prevented from contacting their family by their manager, who kept them as modern day slaves, since they were unpaid. The two boys were told that their mother Harriet was dead – a lie, as their mother was still alive and was constantly searching for them. She eventually found the two boys working for the Ringling Brothers Circus and their family was reunited. Harriet successfully sued Ringling Brothers for the treatment of George and Willie. George and Willie resumed performing for the circus in the late 1920s, when they finally received pay for their work. George died in 1972 and Willie died in 2001.

The book also details Macy's work at finding information about the two brothers and gaining the trust of their niece Nancy Saunders, who cared for Willie until his death.

== Development ==
Macy learned about the Muses in the 1980s, when she began working for The Roanoke Times. She was told that it was "the best story in town" but that no one had been able to get the complete story due to the protectiveness of the Muse family. Macy approached Saunders but was initially rebuffed due to the number of people that tried to invade the men's privacy with "rude" questions. She was given permission to write a series of news articles about Willie and George after the latter of the two brothers died in 2001 and Saunders approved of Macy's plans to write a book about the brothers in late 2013. Macy searched through news clippings and trade presses and also gained information from the Muse family. She also approached older members of the African-American community in Roanoke, where she discovered that some of them assumed that the story of the Muses was a hoax and that "Some of them thought it was true; some of them lived near George and Willie in their later years and were scared of them like a Boo Radley figure."

== Reception ==
Critical reception has been positive. Truevine received reviews from Edward E. Baptist and Janet Maslin, the former of which wrote that "Macy is a gifted storyteller and a dogged researcher, and readers will be riveted by her account of Harriet Muse's struggle to find her sons." USA Today gave the work four and a half stars, as they felt that "Macy's conscientious reporting (affirming the story's accuracy) and her vigorous storytelling make the saga of George and Willie Muse even more enthralling than fiction."
