= List of songs recorded by Oh Land =

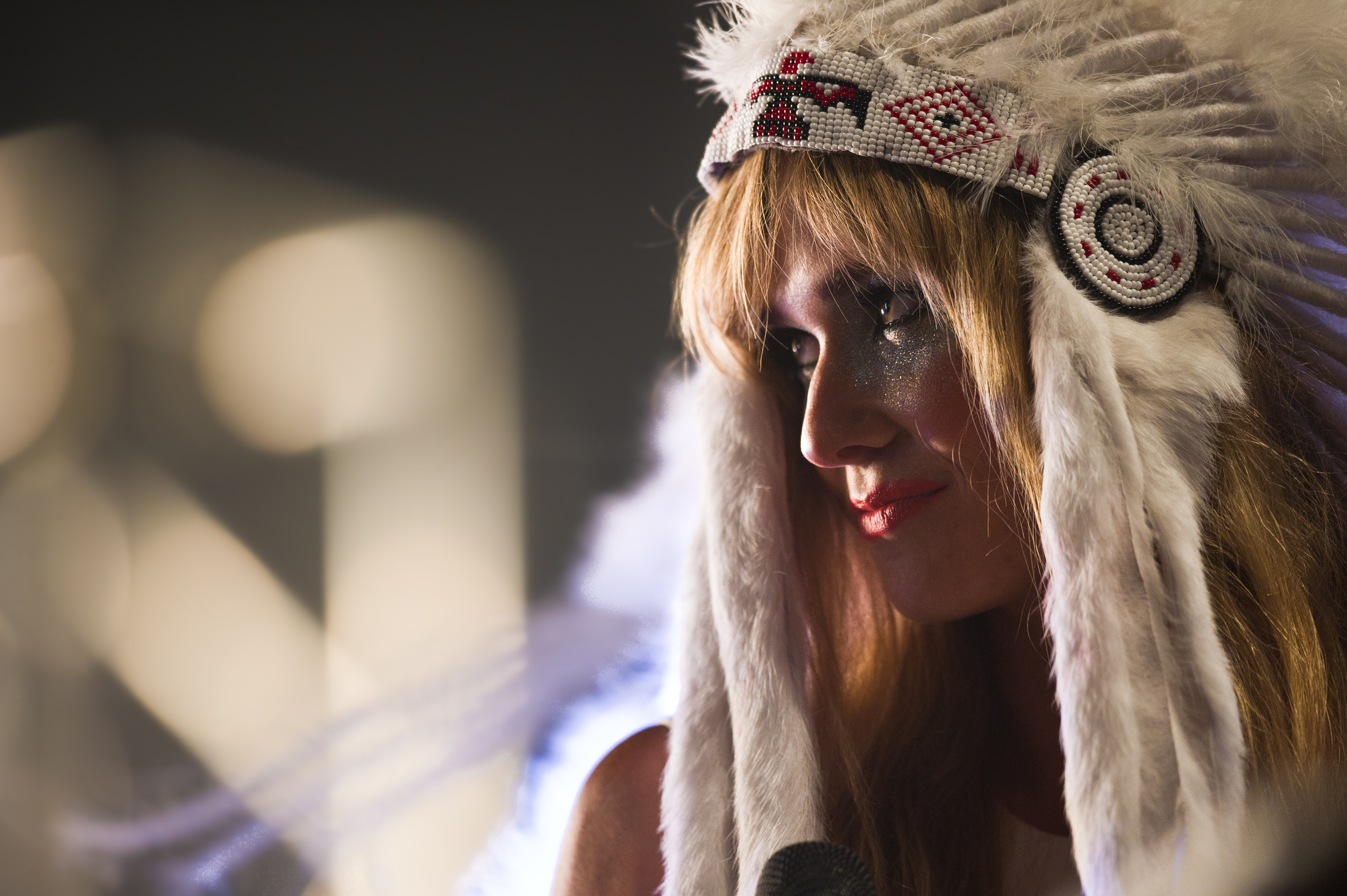
Oh Land performing in 2011

Danish singer-songwriter Oh Land has recorded material for five studio albums and guest features. She has also released an EP and a soundtrack album, and appeared as a featured artist for songs on other artists' releases. After solely writing and independently issuing Fauna in 2008 with Fake Diamond Records, Oh Land released her eponymous second studio album in 2011. Oh Land explored dance and modern pop music and featured contributions from a variety of producers. It peaked at number five on the Danish Albums Chart, and became certified platinum for sales of 20,000 copies in December 2012. Oh Land additionally peaked at number 184 on the United States' Billboard 200, becoming her first and only album to do so. Five singles were released from the effort, with three of them ("Sun of a Gun", "White Nights", and "Speak Out Now") peaking within the top forty of the single charts in Denmark; "Sun of a Gun" also landed the number twelve spot on Billboard's Dance Club Songs chart. Oh Land's "otherworldy vocals" and "lush soundscapes" on the album drew comparisons to the music of Björk, La Roux, and Lykke Li. She was featured three times on Danish rock band Kashmir's sixth studio album Trespassers (2010), on "Bewildering in the City", "Mouthful of Wasps", and "Pallas Athena". In 2011, Oh Land contributed guest vocals to "Life Goes On", a promotional single for The Papercut Chronicles II (2011) by Gym Class Heroes.

The singer spent a two-year hiatus preceding the release of Wish Bone in 2013. The record similarly contained music from the pop genre, and was announced alongside the release of three singles: "Renaissance Girls", "Pyromaniac", and "Cherry on Top". It featured contributions from American musician Dave Sitek and its material was compared to the works of Robyn and Goldfrapp. Additionally, Sitek's work with the singer was outed for not being radio-friendly and instead focused on "strange" and "unidentifiable instrumentation" in order to create unique songs. Oh Land's fourth studio album, Earth Sick, was released in 2014 and promoted by singles "Head Up High" and "Nothing Is Over". As a whole, the record had a much "darker" tone and the songs relied less on the Scandipop genre. Because of her use of synths on Earth Sick, similarities between the singer and Goldfrapp continued. Oh Land was the lone writer for "Love a Man Dead", "Next Summer", and "Renaissance Girls" on Wish Bone while she solely wrote all of the tracks from Earth Sick except for "Machine" and "Nothing Is Over". She also was one of the artists who contributed to the 2015 compilation album Toppen af Poppen 2015, where she sang six covers of previously released songs. In 2016, Oh Land independently released a soundtrack containing music for a Danish revival of the Cinderella ballet tale, titled Askepot. The compilation contains twelve songs, all of which are performed solely by the singer. Dúné collaborated with the singer in 2016 for the song "Fall Back", which is featured on their fourth studio album Delta (2016). Following the announcement that the singer would release her fifth studio album in 2018, she released a soundtrack titled Watermusic featuring thirteen original compositions created for a theatre piece detailing the relationship between romance and water.

== Songs ==
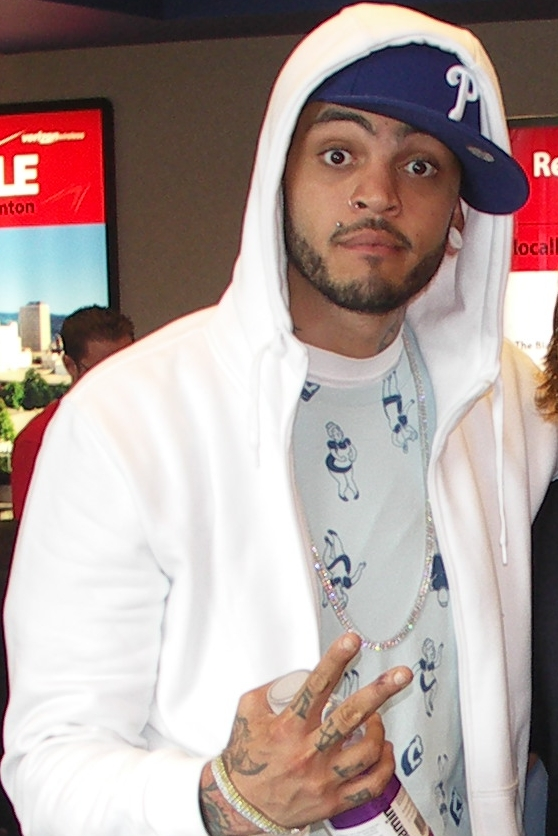
Travie McCoy of Gym Class Heroes co-wrote "Life Goes On", to which Oh Land appears as a featured artist.

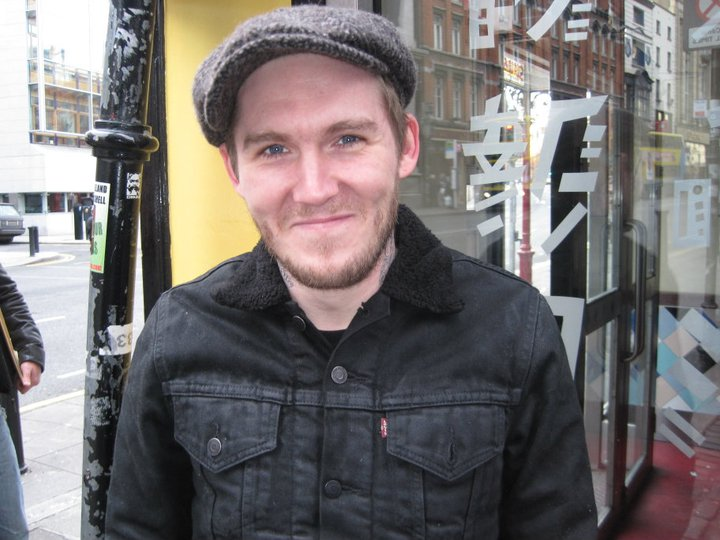
The singer and Brian Fallon collaborated on "We Turn It Up" in 2011.

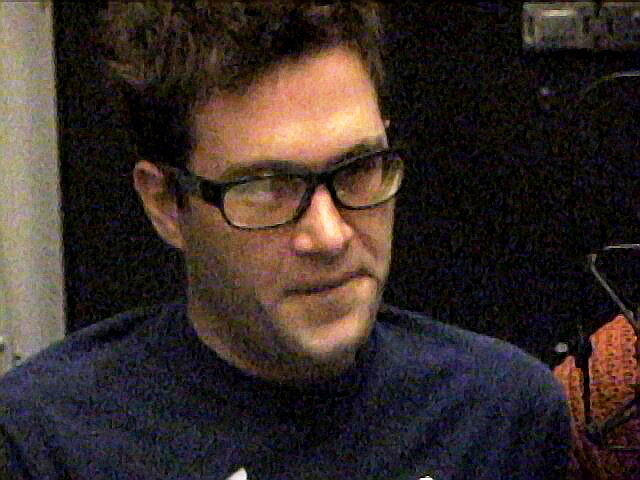
David Andrew Sitek helped Oh Land on various songs for her third studio album, Wish Bone (2013).

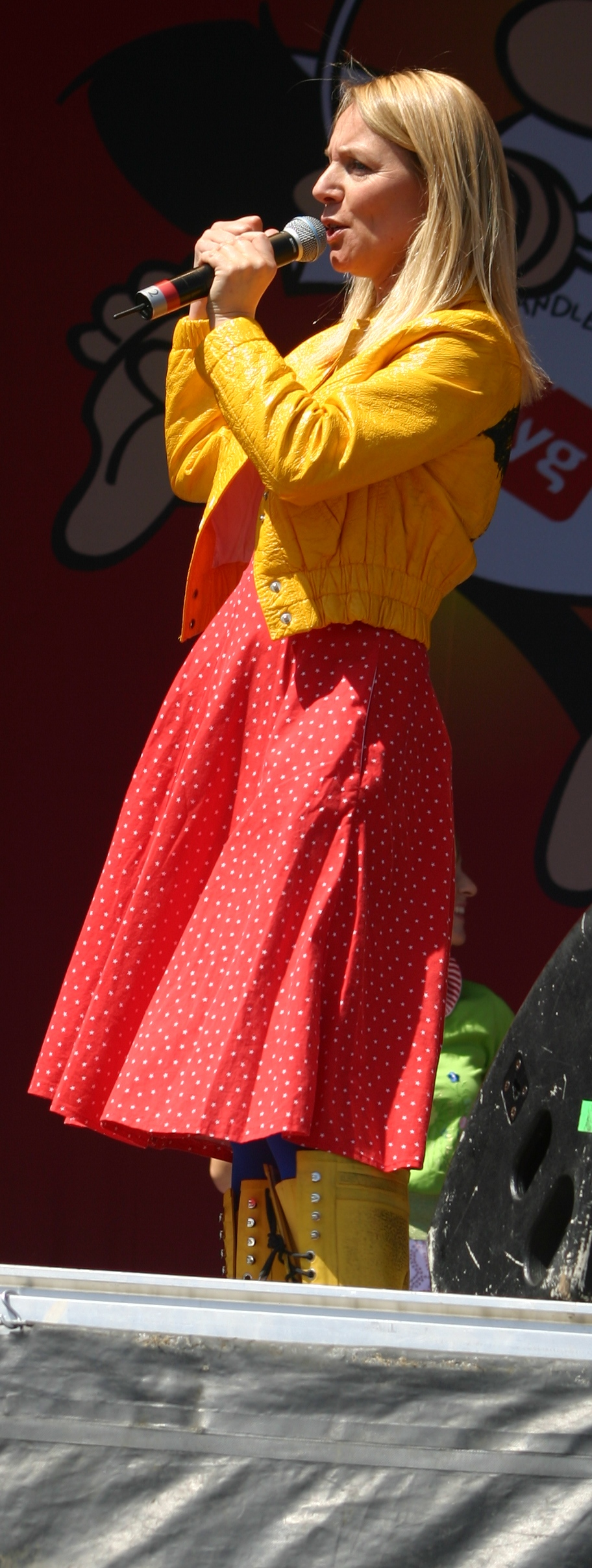
"Det Noget Tosser Gør" was co-written by Alberte Winding in 2009, and includes a contribution from Oh Land.

Name of song, featured performers, writers, originating album, and year released.
Song	Artist(s)	Writer(s)	Album	Year	Ref(s).
"3 Chances"	Oh Land	Oh Land; Julian Bunetta	Wish Bone	2013	
"100% Terrible"	Oh Land	Oh Land; Adnan Zukanovic	Loop Soup	2023	
"Aabne Hjerter"	Oh Land featuring Wafande and Joey Moe	Unknown	Non-album single	2015	
"After the Storm"	Oh Land	Oh Land; Thomas Bartlett	Family Tree	2019	
"Aicha"	Oh Land	Unknown	Toppen af Poppen 2015	2015	
"Alive/Awake"	Oh Land	Oh Land	Fauna	2008	
"Almost Touched"	Oh Land	Oh Land	The Flying Machine	2011	
"Altmuligmanden"	Oh Land	Oh Land	12 Bud På CV	2010	
"Artists Don't Smile"	Oh Land	Oh Land; Lara Andersson; Nick Labajewska Madsen	Loop Soup	2023	
"At First Glance"	Oh Land	Oh Land	Watermusic	2018	
"Audition Day"	Oh Land	Oh Land	Fauna	2008	
"Battle"	Oh Land	Oh Land	Watermusic	2018	
"Better Days"	Oh Land featuring Broods	Oh Land; Adnan Zukanovic; Georgia Nott	Loop Soup	2023	
"Bewildered in the City"	Kashmir featuring Oh Land	Kashmir	Trespassers	2010	
"Bird in an Aeroplane"	Oh Land	Oh Land; David Andrew Sitek	Wish Bone	2013	
"Birds Will Take Me There"	Oh Land	Oh Land	Askepot	2016	
"Bleeed"	Oh Land	Oh Land; Lara Andersson; Nick Labajewska Madsen	Loop Soup	2023	
"Break the Chain"	Oh Land	Oh Land; Dave McCracken	Oh Land	2011	
"Brief Moment"	Oh Land	Oh Land; Adnan Zukanovic; Thomas Bartlett	Family Tree	2019	
"Bucket List"	Oh Land	Oh Land; Lara Andersson; Nick Labajewska Madsen	Loop Soup	2023	
"The Ceremony"	Oh Land	Oh Land	Askepot	2016	
"Cherry on Top"	Oh Land	Oh Land; E. Kidd Bogart; Emanuel Kiriakou	Wish Bone	2013	
"Coma"	Oh Land	Oh Land; Thomas Bartlett	Family Tree	2019	
"Cut a Heel Clip a Toe"	Oh Land	Oh Land	Askepot	2016	
"Dans Din Idot"	Oh Land	Andreas Keilgaard; Shaka Loveless; Søren Schou	Toppen af Poppen 2015	2015	
"Daylight"	Oh Land	Oh Land	Earth Sick	2014	
"Deep Sleep"	Oh Land	Oh Land; Adnan Zukanovic	Loop Soup	2023	
"Deep-Sea"	Oh Land	Oh Land	Fauna	2008	
"Der Står Et Træ"	Oh Land	Lars Lilholt	Toppen af Poppen 2015	2015	
"Der Var et Yndigt Land"	Oh Land	Adam Oehlenschläger; Hans Ernst Krøyer	The Rain	2018	
"Destroy & Rebuild"	Oh Land	Oh Land	Watermusic	2018	
"Det Noget Tosser Gør"	Ormen & Alberte Har; Besøg Af Blæs Bukki featuring Oh Land	Alberte Winding; Lasse Bavngaard	Ormen & Alberte Har Besøg Af Blæs Bukki	2009	
"Doubt My Legs"	Oh Land	Oh Land	Earth Sick	2014	
"Dressing Up"	Oh Land	Oh Land	Askepot	2016	
"Earth Sick"	Oh Land	Oh Land	Earth Sick	2014	
"Elsker Dig Mer"	Oh Land	Oh Land	Watermusic	2018	
"En Linedanser"	Oh Land	Oh Land	Oh Land	2011	
"Ending Song"	Oh Land	Oh Land	Askepot	2016	
"The Escape"	Oh Land	Oh Land	Askepot	2016	
"Etude in E Major, Op. 10 No. 3 'Tristesse'"	Lang Lang featuring Oh Land	Frédéric Chopin	The Chopin Tristesse EP	2012	
"Fall Back"	Dúné featuring Oh Land	Unknown	Delta	2017	
"Family Tree"	Oh Land	Oh Land; Thomas Bartlett	Family Tree	2019	
"Favor Friends"	Oh Land	Oh Land	Earth Sick	2014	
"La Fin"	Cours Lapin featuring Oh Land	Louise Alenius	Cours Lapin	2009	
"First to Say Goodnight"	Oh Land	Oh Land; Sam Farrar	Wish Bone	2013	
"Flags"	Oh Land	Oh Land	Earth Sick	2014	
"The Flood"	Oh Land	Oh Land	Watermusic	2018	
"Frostbite"	Oh Land	Oh Land	Fauna	2008	
"Grand Opening"	Oh Land	Oh Land	Askepot	2016	
"Grand Pas de Seux"	Oh Land	Oh Land	Askepot	2016	
"Great Kills"	Kasper Bjørke featuring Oh Land	Kasper Bjørke	Standing on Top of Utopia	2010	
"Green Card"	Oh Land	Oh Land; Sia Furler; Grant Michaels	Wish Bone	2013	
"Half Hero"	Oh Land	Oh Land	Earth Sick	2014	
"Head Up High"	Oh Land	Oh Land	Earth Sick	2014	
"Heavy Eyes"	Oh Land	Oh Land	Fauna	2008	
"Heiress of Valentina"	Oh Land	Dúné	Toppen af Poppen 2015	2015	
"Helicopter"	Oh Land	Oh Land; Lester Mendez	Oh Land	2011	
"Hjem"	Oh Land	Oh Land	Watermusic	2018	
"Hot 'n' Bothered"	Oh Land	Oh Land	Earth Sick	2014	
"Human"	Oh Land	Oh Land; E. Kidd Bogart	Oh Land	2011	
"Human Error"	Oh Land	Oh Land; Adnan Zukanovic; Thomas Bartlett	Family Tree	2019	
"I Found You"	Oh Land	Oh Land	Fauna	2008	
"I Miss One Week Ago"	Oh Land	Oh Land	Non-album single	2020	
"I Vand"	Oh Land	Oh Land	Watermusic	2018	
"I'm Not Going"	Tricky featuring Oh Land	Adrian Thaws; Oh Land	Skilled Mechanics	2016	
"I'd Rather Sing"	Oh Land	Oh Land; Adnan Zukanovic	Loop Soup	2023	
"Julefeber"	Oh Land	Oh Land; Jesper Mechlenburg	Non-album single	2020	
"Kill My Darling"	Oh Land	Oh Land; David Poe	Wish Bone	2013	
"Kiss in Songs"	Oh Land	Oh Land; Thomas Bartlett	Family Tree	2019	
"Koo Koo"	Oh Land	Oh Land	Fauna	2008	
"Kun for Nu"	Oh Land	Oh Land	Watermusic	2018	
"Last of Our Kinds"	Yuksek featuring Oh Land	Pierre-Alexandre Busson	Partyfine Volume 1	2014	
"Lean"	Oh Land	Oh Land; Dan Carey	Oh Land	2011	
"Life Goes On"	Gym Class Heroes featuring Oh Land	Travie McCoy; Disashi Lumumba-Kasongo; Eric Roberts; Matt McGinley; Annie Clark; Emile Haynie	The Papercut Chronicles II	2011	
"Listen a Little Less"	Oh Land	Oh Land; Adnan Zukanovic	Non-album single	2021	
"Little Things"	Oh Land	Oh Land	Earth Sick	2014	
"Love a Man Dead"	Oh Land	Oh Land	Wish Bone	2013	
"Love Lost City"	Peder featuring Oh Land	Peder Peterson	Dirt & Gold	2010	
"Love You Better"	Oh Land	Oh Land; David Poe	Wish Bone	2013	
"Machine"	Oh Land	Oh Land; Daniel "Danny Keyz" Tannenbaum	Earth Sick	2014	
"Make My Trouble Beautiful"	Oh Land	Oh Land; Thomas Bartlett	Family Tree	2019	
"Mouthful of Wasps"	Kashmir featuring Oh Land	Kashmir	Trespassers	2010	
"My Boxer"	Oh Land	Oh Land; Dan Carey	Wish Bone	2013	
"My Freak"	Oh Land	Oh Land; Nick Labajewska Madsen; Lina Hansson	Loop Soup	2023	
"Nær"	Oh Land	Michael Falch	Toppen af Poppen 10	2020	
"Namazu"	Oh Land	Oh Land	Fauna	2008	
"Nesting"	Oh Land	Oh Land	Watermusic	2018	
"Next Summer"	Oh Land	Oh Land	Wish Bone	2013	
"No Particular Order"	Oh Land	Oh Land	Earth Sick	2014	
"Not Going"	Oh Land	Oh Land	Askepot	2016	
"Nothing Is Over"	Oh Land	Oh Land; Negin Djafari	Earth Sick	2014	
"Numb"	Oh Land	Oh Land	Fauna	2008	
"Open"	Oh Land	Oh Land; Thomas Bartlett	Family Tree	2019	
"Pallas Athena"	Kashmir featuring Oh Land	Kashmir	Trespassers	2010	
"Pas de Troix"	Oh Land	Oh Land	Askepot	2016	
"A Perfect Fit"	Oh Land	Oh Land	Askepot	2016	
"Perfection"	Oh Land	Oh Land; Dan Carey	Oh Land	2011	
"Postpone the Bad"	Oh Land	Oh Land	Fauna	2008	
"Pramdragerens Song"	Oh Land	Oh Land	Watermusic	2018	
"Pressure's On"	Oh Land	Oh Land; Adnan Zukanovic	Loop Soup	2023	
"Pretty Is Dead"	Oh Land featuring Ximena Sariñana	Oh Land; Adnan Zukanovic; Ximena Sariñana	Loop Soup	2023	
"Pyromaniac"	Oh Land	Oh Land; Jimmy Harry	Wish Bone	2013	
"Rainbow"	Oh Land	Oh Land; Dave McCracken	Oh Land	2011	
"Release Me"	Oh Land	Oh Land	Fauna	2008	
"Renaissance Girls"	Oh Land	Oh Land	Wish Bone	2013	
"Right Here"	Tricky featuring Oh Land	Adrian Thaws; Oh Land	Adrian Thaws	2014	
"Salt"	Oh Land	Oh Land; Thomas Bartlett	Family Tree	2019	
"Shadowlands"	Oh Land	Oh Land	Watermusic	2018	
"Sirens"	Oh Land	Oh Land	Watermusic	2018	
"Skjulte Øjne"	Sebastian featuring Oh Land	Unknown	De Bedste Sange	2015	
"Sleepy Town"	Oh Land	Oh Land; David Andrew Sitek; David Poe	Wish Bone	2013	
"Slow"	Oh Land and Turboweekend	Unknown	Non-album single	2015	
"Someone I Can Be Alone With"	Oh Land	Oh Land; Adnan Zukanovic; Thomas Bartlett	Family Tree	2019	
"Speak to Me with Love"	Oh Land	Oh Land; Thomas Bartlett	Family Tree	2019	
"Speak Out Now"	Oh Land	Oh Land; Kristian Leth; Fridolin Nordsø	Oh Land	2011	
"The Spell"	Oh Land	Unknown	Toppen af Poppen 2015	2015	
"Still Here!"	Oh Land	Oh Land	Fauna	2008	
"Sun of a Gun"	Oh Land	Oh Land; Jimmy Harry	Oh Land	2011	
"Sunlight"	Oh Land	Oh Land; Dan Carey; Thomas Bartlett	Family Tree	2019	
"The Swan Arrives"	Oh Land	Oh Land	Watermusic	2018	
"Tea Dance"	Oh Land	Oh Land	Askepot	2016	
"Tingeltangeltingeltangel"	Maeckes featuring Oh Land	Markus Winter	Mash Up! 2	2010	
"Trailblazer"	Oh Land	Oh Land	Earth Sick	2014	
"Twist"	Oh Land	Oh Land; Ryan Breen	Oh Land	2011	
"Ulvesangen"	Oh Land	Unknown	Toppen af Poppen 2015	2015	
"Voodoo"	Oh Land	Oh Land; Dan Carey	Oh Land	2011	
"Waiting"	Oh Land	Oh Land; Lara Andersson; Adnan Zukanovic	Loop Soup	2023	
"We Turn It Up"	Oh Land	Oh Land; Dave McCracken; Brian Fallon	Oh Land	2011	
"When a Hawk Comes By"	Oh Land	Oh Land; Adnan Zukanovic; Thomas Bartlett	Replanting Family Tree	2019	
"White Nights"	Oh Land	Oh Land; Dave McCracken	Oh Land	2011	
"White Winter Hymnal"	Oh Land	Robin Pecknold	Live Sessions	2011	
"Wishes"	Oh Land	Oh Land	Non-album single	2019	
"Wolf & I"	Oh Land	Oh Land; Owen Beverly	Oh Land	2011	
