= Oh Land discography =

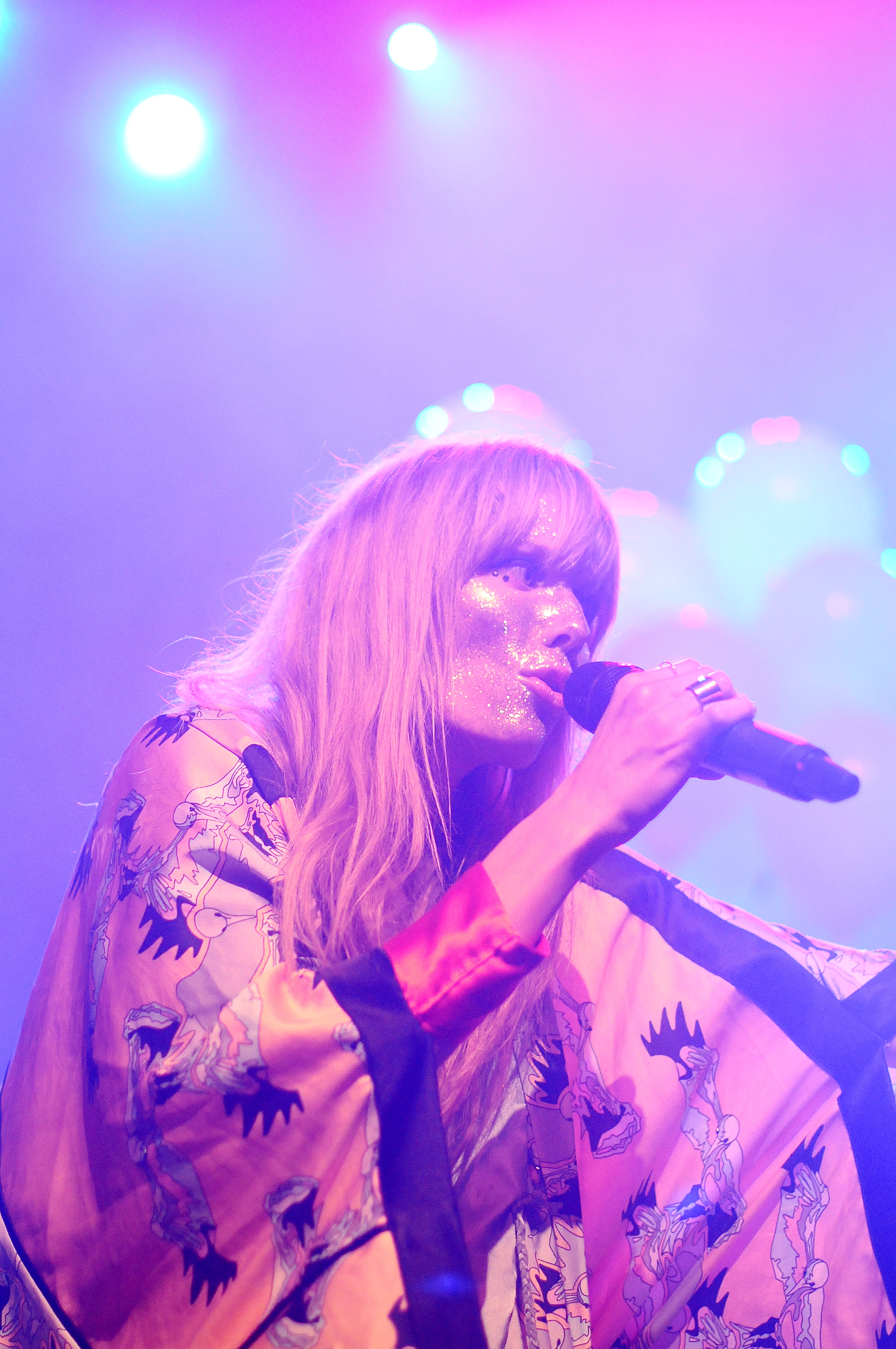
- Oh Land performing live in Los Angeles in 2011
- Studio albums: 6
- EPs: 4
- Soundtrack albums: 2
- Singles: 32
- Music videos: 17
- Promotional singles: 9
- Guest appearances: 32

Danish singer Oh Land has released six studio albums, four extended plays (EPs), 32 singles (including four as a featured artist), nine promotional singles, and 15 music videos. When signed to Fake Diamond Records, Oh Land released her debut album, Fauna, in November 2008. Following a performance at the 2009 SXSW event, she met a representative from Epic Records and signed with the label. She released her major-label debut single "Sun of a Gun" in October 2010, which charted in five countries and served as the lead single to her 2011 self-titled studio album. Oh Land peaked at number five in Denmark and also entered the Billboard 200 in the United States. It would go on to be certified Platinum for selling over 20,000 copies in the former country. The album spawned four additional singles, including "Wolf & I", "Voodoo", "White Nights", and "Speak Out Now"; the latter two songs both charted within the top twenty in Oh Land's native Denmark and were also certified Gold by IFPI Denmark. In 2012, the singer was featured on Gym Class Heroes' song "Life Goes On", which entered the Tophit chart in Russia.

She released her third studio album, Wish Bone, in 2013 with Tusk or Tooth Records and A:larm Music. It peaked at number four in Denmark and appeared on the Top Heatseekers component chart in the United States. "Renaissance Girls", "Pyromaniac", and "Cherry on Top" were available as singles and all three of them had accompanying music videos, in addition to promotional single "My Boxer". Her fourth studio album, Earth Sick (2014), features the singles "Head Up High" and "Nothing Is Over". Oh Land's first soundtrack album, Askepot, was distributed digitally in 2016 and accompanies a live opera retelling of Cinderella. A music video was created for Wish Bone's "Love You Better" in 2016, prompting it to chart on the digital component chart in Denmark at number six. The singer announced that she planned to release her fifth studio album titled Family Tree on 3 May 2019. It reached number 35 in Denmark and spawned three singles: "Human Error", "Brief Moment", and "Kiss in Songs". Oh Land released numerous non-album singles in the 2020s, including "I Miss One Week Ago", "Listen a Little Less", and "Julefeber", the lattermost of which reached the top 40 in Denmark and was certified Gold. Her sixth studio album, Loop Soup, was released in September 2023 and supported by the singles "Bleeed", "My Freak", and "Bucket List".

== Studio albums ==
Title	Album details	Peak chart positions					Certifications
Title	Album details	DEN	US	US Alt.	US Heat	US Rock	Certifications
Fauna	Released: 10 November 2008; Label: Fake Diamond; Format: CD · digital download · LP · streaming	—	—	—	—	—	
Oh Land	Released: 14 March 2011; Label: Fake Diamond · Epic · A:larm Music; Format: CD · digital download · LP · streaming	5	184	24	5	43	DEN: Platinum
Wish Bone	Released: 16 September 2013; Label: Tusk or Tooth · A:larm Music; Format: CD · digital download · streaming	4	—	—	32	—	
Earth Sick	Released: 11 November 2014; Label: Tusk or Tooth; Format: CD · digital download · LP · streaming	—	—	—	—	—	
Family Tree	Released: 3 May 2019; Label: Tusk or Tooth · Universal Music; Format: CD · digital download · LP · streaming	35	—	—	—	—	
Loop Soup	Released: 29 September 2023; Label: Tusk or Tooth · Universal Music; Format: Digital download · LP · streaming	—	—	—	—	—	
"—" denotes a title that did not chart, or was not released in that territory.

== Extended plays ==
Title	EP details
Oh Land EP	Released: 19 October 2010; Label: Epic; Format: CD · digital download · streaming
Live Sessions	Released: 13 May 2011; Label: Sony Music Entertainment; Format: Streaming
Replanting Family Tree	Released: 18 September 2019; Label: Self-released; Format: Digital download · streaming
Xtra	Released: 11 November 2022; Label: Tusk or Tooth; Format: Digital download · streaming

== Soundtracks ==
Title	Soundtrack details
Askepot	Released: 4 November 2016; Label: Self-released; Format: Digital download · streaming
Watermusic	Released: 30 March 2018; Label: Self-released; Format: Digital download · streaming

== Singles ==
=== As lead artist ===
List of singles as lead artist, with selected chart positions, showing year released and album name
Title	Year	Peak chart positions					Certifications	Album
Title	Year	DEN	AUT	BEL (WA)	GER	US Dance	Certifications	Album
"Audition Day"	2008	—	—	—	—	—		Fauna
"Heavy Eyes"	2009	—	—	—	—	—		Fauna
"Sun of a Gun"	2010	31	59	43	60	12		Oh Land
"Wolf & I"	2011	—	—	—	—	—		Oh Land
"Voodoo"	2011	—	—	—	—	—		Oh Land
"White Nights"	2011	13	—	—	—	—	DEN: Gold	Oh Land
"Speak Out Now"	2011	4	—	—	—	—	DEN: Gold	Oh Land
"Renaissance Girls"	2013	—	—	—	—	—		Wish Bone
"Pyromaniac"	2013	—	—	—	—	—		Wish Bone
"Cherry on Top"	2014	—	—	—	—	—		Wish Bone
"Head Up High"	2014	—	—	—	—	—		Earth Sick
"Nothing Is Over"	2014	—	—	—	—	—		Earth Sick
"Slow" (with Turboweekend)	2015	—	—	—	—	—		Non-album singles
"Aabne Hjerter" (featuring Mattias Kolstrup, Wafande, and Joey Moe)	2015	—	—	—	—	—		Non-album singles
"Human Error"	2019	—	—	—	—	—		Family Tree
"Brief Moment"	2019	—	—	—	—	—		Family Tree
"Kiss in Songs"	2019	—	—	—	—	—		Family Tree
"Salt" (Arthur Moon remix)	2019	—	—	—	—	—		Replanting Family Tree
"Wishes"	2019	—	—	—	—	—		Non-album singles
"I Miss One Week Ago"	2020	—	—	—	—	—		Non-album singles
"Julefeber"	2020	19	—	—	—	—	DEN: Gold	Non-album singles
"Listen a Little Less"	2021	—	—	—	—	—		Non-album singles
"Sådan Ligger Landet"	2022	—	—	—	—	—		Xtra
"Bad Timing"	2022	—	—	—	—	—		Xtra
"Bleeed"	2023	—	—	—	—	—		Loop Soup
"My Freak"	2023	—	—	—	—	—		Loop Soup
"Bucket List"	2023	—	—	—	—	—		Loop Soup
"Deep Sleep"	2025	—	—	—	—	—		Loop Soup
"—" denotes a title that did not chart, or was not released in that territory.

=== As featured artist ===
List of featured singles, showing year released and album name
Title	Year	Album
"Det Noget Tosser Gør" (Ormen & Alberte Har Besøg Af Blæs Bukki featuring Oh Land)	2009	Ormen & Alberte Har Besøg Af Blæs Bukki
"Love Lost City" (Peder featuring Oh Land)	2010	Dirt & Gold
"Rumskib" (Nikolaj Nørlund featuring Oh Land)	2020	Hverdag i Paradis
"Monster" (Burhan G featuring Oh Land)	2022	Non-album single

=== Promotional singles ===
List of promotional singles, showing year released and album name
Title	Year	Album
"We Turn It Up"	2011	Oh Land
"Life Goes On" (Gym Class Heroes featuring Oh Land)	2012	The Papercut Chronicles II
"My Boxer"	2013	Wish Bone
"Earth Sick"	2014	Earth Sick
"Der Var et Yndigt Land"	2018	Non-album promotional single
"Family Tree"	2019	Family Tree
"Nær"	2020	Toppen af Poppen 10
"Vilde Piger Vilde Drenge" (featuring Zeritu Kebede)	2020	Non-album promotional single
"I'd Rather Sing"	2023	Loop Soup

== Other charted songs ==
List of songs, with selected chart positions, showing year released and album name
Title	Year	Peak chart positions	Album
Title	Year	DEN Digital	Album
"Love You Better"	2013	6	Wish Bone

== Guest appearances ==
List of non-single guest appearances, with other performing artists, showing year released and album name
Title	Year	Album
"Altmuligmanden"	2010	12 Bud På CV
"Great Kills" (Kasper Bjørke featuring Oh Land)	2010	Standing on Top of Utopia
"Bewildered in the City" (Kashmir featuring Oh Land)	2010	Trespassers
"Mouthful of Wasps" (Kashmir featuring Oh Land)	2010	Trespassers
"Pallas Athena" (Kashmir featuring Oh Land)	2010	Trespassers
"Tingeltangeltingeltangel" (Maeckes featuring Oh Land)	2010	Mash Up! 2
"La Fin" (Cours Lapin featuring Oh Land)	2010	Cours Lapin
"Almost Touched"	2011	The Flying Machine
"Twist"	2011	Abduction (Original Motion Picture Soundtrack)
"Etude in E Major, Op. 10 No. 3 'Tristesse'" (Frédéric Chopin with Oh Land)	2012	The Chopin Tristesse EP
"Last of Our Kinds" (Yuksek featuring Oh Land)	2013	Partyfine Volume 1
"Right Here" (Tricky featuring Oh Land)	2014	Adrian Thaws
"Aicha"	2015	Toppen af Poppen 2015
"Dans Din Idiot"	2015	Toppen af Poppen 2015
"Der Står Et Træ"	2015	Toppen af Poppen 2015
"Heiress of Valentina"	2015	Toppen af Poppen 2015
"The Spell"	2015	Toppen af Poppen 2015
"Ulvesangen"	2015	Toppen af Poppen 2015
"Skjulte Øjne" (Sebastian featuring Oh Land)	2015	De Bedste Sange
"I En Gade Gik Jeg Engang" (Lars Lilholt featuring Oh Land)	2015	Amulet
"Still Life" (Peder featuring Oh Land)	2016	Come with Me
"I'm Not Going" (Tricky featuring Oh Land)	2016	Skilled Mechanics
"Echo My Shout" (Mattias Kolstrup with lyrics co-written by Oh Land)	2016	Norskov (Original Soundtrack of the TV Series)
"Fall Back" (Dúné featuring Oh Land)	2017	Delta
"Sig Mit Navn" (Lars Lilholt featuring Oh Land)	2018	Drømmefanger
"En Morgen I Amsterdam" (Lars Lilholt featuring Oh Land)	2018	Drømmefanger
"Desert Island"	2018	DALI CD Volume 5 - Thirty Five Years
"Running Off" (Tricky featuring Oh Land)	2020	Fall to Pieces
"I'm in the Doorway" (Tricky featuring Oh Land)	2020	Fall to Pieces
"Glemmer Du?" (Kali featuring Oh Land)	2021	Ingen Skam
"Under" (Lonely Guest and Tricky featuring Oh Land)	2021	Lonely Guest
"The Test of Time" (Kasper Winding featuring Oh Land)	2022	The Test of Time, Pt. 1

== Music videos ==
List of music videos, with directors, showing year released
Title	Year	Director(s)
"Heavy Eyes"	2009	ArtPeople
"Sun of a Gun"	2010	ThirtyTwo
"White Nights"	2011	Canada
"Rainbow"	2011	Eske Kath
"Speak Out Now"	2012	Unknown
"My Boxer"	2013	Unknown
"Renaissance Girls"	2013	Duncan Winecoff
"Pyromaniac"	2013	Rasmus Weng Karlsen & Jasper Carlberg
"Cherry on Top"	2014	Duncan Winecoff
"Head Up High"	2014	Duncan Winecoff
"Nothing Is Over"	2014	Lauren Cohan
"Flags"	2015	Oh Land
"Love You Better"	2016	Kristian Levring
"Family Tree"	2019	Helena Christensen
"Vilde Piger Vilde Drenge"	2020	René Sascha Johannsen
"Julefeber"	2020	Unknown
"Listen a Little Less"	2021	Unknown
"Pressure's On"	2023	Ida Kvetny
