= My Boxer =

Promotional single by Oh Land

from the album Wish Bone
- Released: 10 July 2013
- Recorded: 2013
- Studio: Mr. Dan's (Streatham)
- Genre: Electropop
- Length: 2:50
- Label: Tusk or Tooth; A:larm Music
- Songwriter(s): Nanna Øland Fabricius; Dan Carey
- Producer(s): Dan Carey

"My Boxer" is a song recorded by Danish singer and songwriter Oh Land. It was included on her third studio album, Wish Bone (2013), and released digitally on 10 July 2013 by Tusk or Tooth Records and A:larm Music. The track was written by Nanna Øland Fabricius and Dan Carey; Carey also served as the sole producer. An electropop recording with a rhythmic beat, its lyrics were inspired by an event where Oh Land walked a blind lady across the street. She compared the experience to having a boxer living in her ear.

Music critics found the track to be both "weird" and "excellent", leaving other reviewers to have a mixed opinion towards it. The song was compared to the works of several artists, including Robyn, Santigold and Gwen Stefani. An accompanying music video was released on 12 July 2013 and features Oh Land riding a bike through various streets with a small dog in her bicycle basket.

== Background and composition ==
"My Boxer" was the first track released for her then-upcoming third studio album, and she premiered it digitally on Spin's official website on 10 July 2013. It was written by Oh Land, while Dan Carey helped with the writing and its production. It was recorded at Mr. Dans recording studios in London in 2013. While creating music for her third record, Wish Bone (2013), Oh Land wanted to incorporate pop music that was more complex. Also, the singer hoped that listeners of her album would find it weird and enjoy it because of that. Incorporating these ideas, she claimed that "My Boxer" was inspired by an embarrassing event that occurred in her life:

There was this one time where I had to take a blind lady across the street and I’d never done that before. I took her hand which is so obviously wrong! You don’t take a stranger’s hand! Like a 45-year-old woman! But once you take someone’s hand you can’t just let go because then you’re admitting your own awkwardness. I just held her hand and in the middle of the street she turns around and is like, ‘Do you mind if we don’t hold hands.’

"My Boxer" is an electropop song with an "aggressive and rhythmic" sound that has a duration of two minutes and 50 seconds. It was one of the few tracks not produced by musician Dave Sitek and was instead handled by Carey who used "bobs and weaves with jabbing percussion, glitchy electronics, and a dangerously hummable melody" in its production. Regarding its genre, Jim Carroll of The Irish Times stated that it can be placed under "smart premier league pop" and also said it is cheerful. AllMusic's James Christopher Monger described "My Boxer" as a "forced dancefloor rave" and compared it to the works of American singer Santigold. Similarly, Michael Jose Gonzalez from Gaffa felt the singer took influence from Robyn, while The Argus's Rosie Clarke found its lyrics resembled Gwen Stefani's catalogue. The singer asks herself within the lyrics on various occasions, "Is that weird?", responding to her questions concerning whether or not a boxer living in her ear is strange. Her pondering is accompanied by a "pulsating beat" that resembles a live boxer. At one point during the song, Oh Land speaks into a megaphone and quizzes her lover: "Does baby like weird?".

== Critical reception ==
The Guardian's Paul MacInnes applauded the song, finding it as proof that Oh Land's artistry varies on Wish Bone and declaring it "excellent". Michelle Geslani, a writer for Consequence of Sound called the song "a little" weird but then continued, "but we like weird". Jennifer Jof from Neon Tommy singled out "My Boxer" from Wish Bone and declared it the unofficial "anthem" on the album due to its uniqueness. She claimed the "insane and nonsensical lyrics" make the track "so fun to listen to". Monger from AllMusic was more mixed towards both "My Boxer" and single "Cherry on Top", writing that "neither song is a deal breaker, especially when they're tempered by better versions of themselves", citing album tracks "Pyromaniac" and "Love You Better" as examples.

== Music video ==
An accompanying music video for "My Boxer" premiered on 12 July 2013 through her official website and YouTube account. The clip features Oh Land riding on a bike through various streets. Towards the beginning of the video, an elderly lady stares at the singer as she steers with a small puppy in her bicycle basket.
