= Pyromaniac (Oh Land song) =

Single by Oh Land

from the album Wish Bone
- Released: 2 September 2013
- Recorded: 2013
- Studio: Federal Prism Studios (Glendale, California)
- Genre: Funk; pop; soul
- Length: 3:44
- Label: Tusk or Tooth; A:larm Music
- Songwriter(s): Nanna Øland Fabricius; Jimmy Harry
- Producer(s): David Andrew Sitek

Oh Land singles chronology
"Renaissance Girls" (2013)	"Pyromaniac" (2013)	"Cherry on Top" (2014)

"Pyromaniac" is a song by Danish singer-songwriter Oh Land, taken from her third studio album Wish Bone (2013). It was released digitally as the album's second single on 2 September 2013 by Tusk or Tooth and A:larm Music, exclusively in Denmark. The track was written by Oh Land and Jimmy Harry, and produced by David Andrew Sitek. A combination of funk, pop, and soul music, "Pyromaniac" features a hook with repetitive lyrics and was compared to the works of several artists, including the Cardigans, Robyn, and Phoenix.

Receiving a mixed response from music critics, "Pyromaniac" was highlighted for being a strong track on Wish Bone but faulted for being inferior to her previous singles. A music video for the single was released on 13 September 2013 and directed by Rasmus Weng Karlsen and Jasper Carlberg. It features the singer in a variety of outfits.

== Background and composition ==
"Pyromaniac" is taken from Oh Land's third studio album, Wish Bone (2013). The album's second single overall, "Pyromaniac" was released as a digital download on 2 September 2013 by Tusk or Tooth Records and A:larm Music; it was distributed exclusively in Denmark. It was written by Oh Land and Jimmy Harry, and produced by David Andrew Sitek. Additionally, several musicians contributed to the track, including drummer Nathaniel Morton, Todd Simon who played brass instruments, and Zeph Showers who served as the head audio engineer and mixer. The song itself was recorded at Federal Prism Studios in Glendale, California.

Musically, "Pyromaniac" features a "sweet melody" and "occasional minor-key twists". Leonie Cooper from NME described the song's genre as "straight-up lo-fi funk" and claimed it "com[es] on like Robyn produced by Phoenix". Continuing, Michael Jose Gonzalez of Gaffa called it a mixture of pop, funk, and soul music. Throughout the song, Oh Land repeatedly sings "woo-hoo", which was considered reminiscent to some of her previous singles. Jennifer Joh from Neon Tommy compared it to the Cardigans' 1996 single "Lovefool".

== Critical reception ==
"Pyromaniac" received a mixed to positive response from music critics. NME's Leonie Cooper called it "remarkable", while James Christopher Monger from AllMusic called the song a "better version" of Oh Land's "My Boxer" (2013); he also described it as "Studio 54-kissed". Gaffa's Michael Jose Gonzalez listed "Renaissance Girls", "My Boxer", and "Pyromaniac" as three potential hits from Wish Bone in his album review. In a highly positive review, Neon Tommy's Jennifer Joh called it "very quintessential Oh Land" and "different and clearly inspired by more classic songs". In a more mixed review, Christopher Monk from musicOMH felt that the song (and the parent album) was not "lacking in hooks" and considered it one of Wish Bone's strongest tracks, but overall said that it (along with "Bird in an Aeroplane" and "Cherry on Top") cannot match the quality or catchiness of her previous singles, listing "Sun of a Gun" and "White Nights" as two examples. Similarly, Hannah Eads from The Daily Nebraskan considered both "Pyromaniac" and "Renaissance Girls" to be "just as edgy and catchy as the first", but claimed that "the songs contribute nothing new to the genre".

== Music video ==
An accompanying music video for "Pyromaniac" was directed by Rasmus Weng Karlsen and Jasper Carlberg. It was released on 13 September 2013 via Oh Land's official YouTube account. The video features the singer in a wide variety of outfits. Some of the scenes include Oh Land in front of several fire dancers, singing in front of a mirror, and skinny dipping with a group of friends. During the aforementioned scene where Oh Land appears swimming in the nude, censor bars are used.

== Personnel ==
Personnel adapted from Wish Bone liner notes.

- Nanna Øland Fabricius – vocals, lyrics, instruments
- Jimmy Harry – lyrics
- Nathaniel Morton – drums
- Todd Simon – brass
- David Andrew Sitek – production, instruments
- Zeph Sowers – engineering, mixing

== Release history ==
Region	Date	Format	Label
Denmark	2 September 2013	Digital download	Tusk or Tooth Records; A:larm Music
