= Cherry on Top =

Cherry on Top may refer to:

- "A Cherry on Top", a song by The Knife from the album Shaking the Habitual
- "Cherry on Top" (Bini song), 2024
- "Cherry on Top" (Oh Land song), 2014
- "Cherry on Top", a song by Jake Owen from the album Easy Does It

== See also ==
- Cherry top, a roof-mounted single beacon emergency vehicle light
- Cherry on the Cake, a 2012 French-Italian romantic comedy film
