= Cherry on Top (Oh Land song) =

Single by Oh Land

from the album Wish Bone
- Released: 20 April 2014
- Recorded: 2013
- Studio: Federal Prism Studios (Glendale, California)
- Genre: Pop; R&B
- Length: 3:48
- Label: Tusk or Tooth; A:larm Music
- Songwriter(s): Nanna Øland Fabricius; E. Kidd Bogart; Emanuel Kiriakou
- Producer(s): David Andrew Sitek

Oh Land singles chronology
"Pyromaniac" (2013)	"Cherry on Top" (2014)	"Head Up High" (2014)

"Cherry on Top" is a song by Danish singer-songwriter Oh Land, taken from her third studio album Wish Bone (2013). It was released digitally as the album's third and final single on 20 April 2014 by Tusk or Tooth and A:larm Music. The song was written by Oh Land, E. Kidd Bogart and Emanuel Kiriakou, while production was handled by David Andrew Sitek. A pop and R&B song, "Cherry on Top" features "relatable" lyrics about one wanting to achieve it all.

The song garnered a mixed reception from music critics. Some considered it a stand-out track on the parent album while others found it to be unmemorable and "over-the-top". An accompanying music video was filmed in New York City and premiered simultaneously with the single's release. It was directed by Duncan Winecoff and features Oh Land as a piano player working for a ballet studio instructor, portrayed by Helena Christensen. The main narrative is about a young male ballet student who dreams of becoming a professional dancer.

== Background and composition ==
"Cherry on Top" is taken from Oh Land's third studio album, Wish Bone (2013). The album's third and final single, its release coincided with the premiere of the corresponding music video on 20 April 2014 by Tusk or Tooth Records and A:larm Music. "Cherry on Top" was written by Oh Land, E. Kidd Bogart and Emanuel Kiriakou, while production was handled by David Andrew Sitek. Additionally, several musicians contributed to the track, including drummer Nathaniel Morton and Zeph Showers who served as the head audio engineer and mixer. The song itself was recorded at Federal Prism Studios in Glendale, California, in 2013.

"Cherry on Top" is a pop and R&B track with a duration of three minutes and 48 seconds. Unlike the majority of Oh Land's songs, it is not an uptempo track. Instead, it contains "piano instrumentals" and "light background harmonies". It features lyrics with a "relatable" message and "figurative imagery". Oh Land herself stated that the song is about "always going for the win, always focusing on the result and sometimes missing the process because you're such a perfectionist". According to Paul MacInnes from The Guardian, the lyrics serve as a "plea to a lover about the pitfalls of excess"; the song opens with Oh Land singing, "Small boy, big dreams / Going in for a bite", which is "sublimely literal". She proceeds in the chorus: "You can have it all but you never stop / 'Cause all you ever want is the cherry on top" / "And all you ever dreamed of, it ain't enough / You'll never fill that hole with the cherry on top".

== Critical reception ==
"Cherry on Top" received mixed reviews from music critics. Neon Tommy's Jennifer Joh highlighted both "Cherry on Top" and album track "3 Chances" for "continu[ing] the ebb and flow that is the essence of th[e] album"; she also enjoyed Oh Land's "clean and seductive vocals". Kayleigh Watson, an editor for Renowned for Sound, liked the "impish yet cutesy quality" of the song, calling it part of Wish Bone's "magically imaginative mental joyride". Also, Jesse Cataldo from Slant Magazine referred to the song as "hit[ting] the right balance" on Wish Bone. He liked that the recording "display[ed] Scandinavian reserve on the verses and bloom[ed] into something more lively during the choruses". In a mixed review, Christopher Monk from musicOMH felt that the song (and the parent album) was not "lacking in hooks" and considered it one of Wish Bone's strongest tracks, but overall said that it (along with "Bird in an Aeroplane" and "Pyromaniac") cannot match the quality or catchiness of her previous singles, listing "Sun of a Gun" and "White Nights" as two examples. James Christopher Monger from AllMusic called the song "radio-ready" but criticized it for being inferior to Oh Land's "Love You Better", which also appears on Wish Bone. Describing it as one of the album's "slower songs", Hannah Eads for The Daily Nebraskan felt the track was "over-the-top in all the wrong places" and was used as a "half-made attempt at breaking up the album's non-stop, fast-paced beat".

== Music video ==
An accompanying music video for "Cherry on Top" was released on 20 April 2014. It was directed by frequent collaborator Duncan Winecoff while the cinematography was headed by Jake Saner. Casting calls for the video began in January 2014 as filming was scheduled to start on February 8 and end on February 10. Shot inside a ballet studio, Oh Land assumes the role of a substitute piano player who was hired by the studio's instructor (Helena Christensen). It tells the story of a male ballet dancer (Drew Minard) who works hard in order to receive the career of his dreams, although "he didn't have anyone to share it with" because he was overly determined. According to Winecoff, he would like to expand the video into a series of "three short films" with "Cherry on Top" serving as the very first one; he also said that over time "a larger storyline will emerge, having much to do with dance, music, love and the power of the human spirit". However, no other films from the planned series have been created.

== Personnel ==
Personnel adapted from the liner notes of Wish Bone.

- Nanna Øland Fabricius – vocals, lyrics, instruments
- E. Kidd Bogart – lyrics
- Emanuel Kiriakou – lyrics
- Nathaniel Morton – drums
- David Andrew Sitek – production, instruments
- Zeph Sowers – engineering, mixing
