= Natasha Vargas-Cooper =

American journalist and author (born c. 1984)

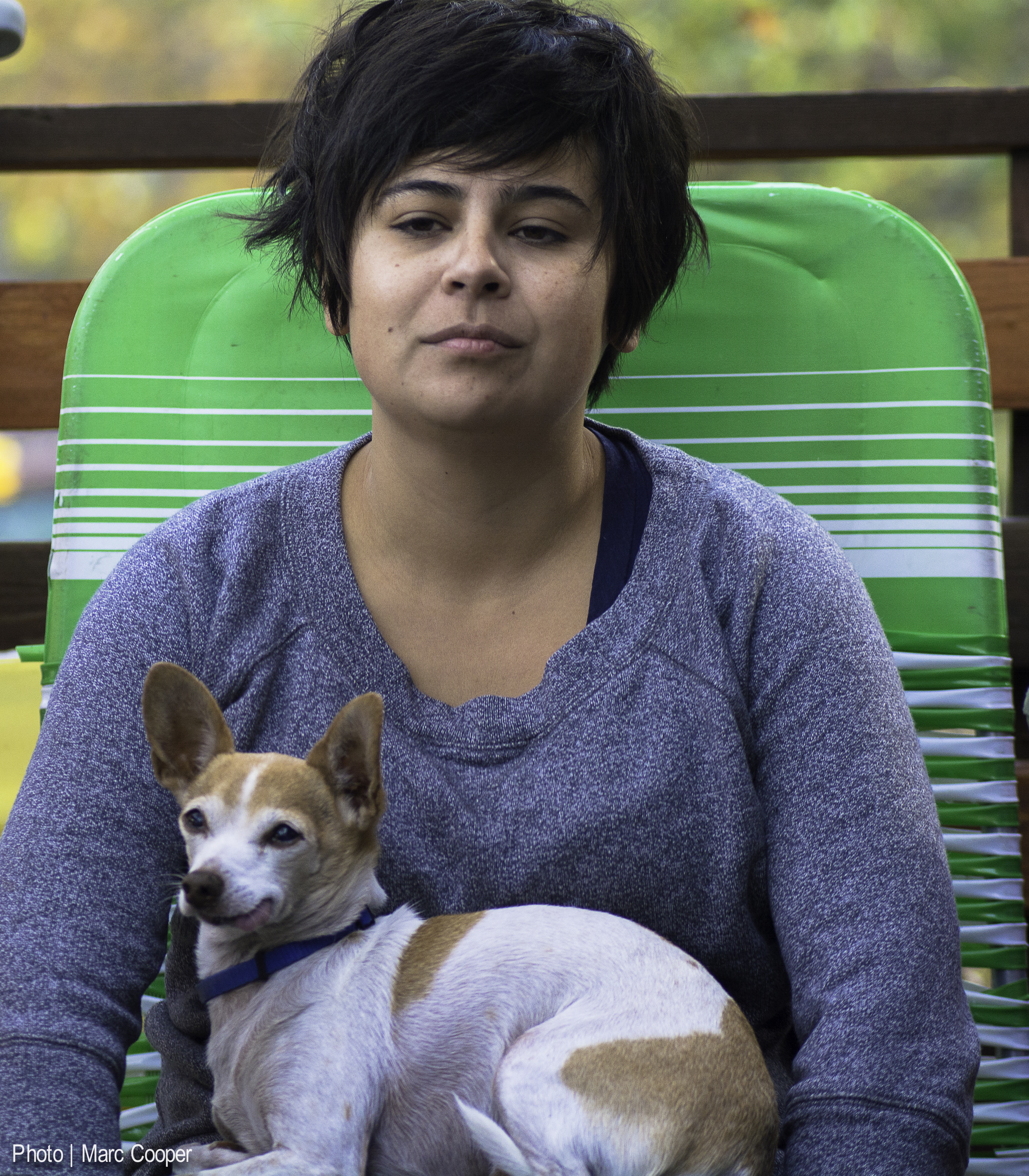
- Born: c. 1984; Los Angeles, California, U.S.
- Education: UCLA
- Occupations: Journalist and author
- Years active: 2009–present

Natasha Vargas-Cooper is an American journalist and author. Her writing has been published in The New York Times, The Wall Street Journal, The Guardian, GQ, Spin, The Atlantic, the New Statesman, Good magazine, Bookforum, BlackBook, New York magazine, and Los Angeles magazine. Her writing has also been featured on websites such as The Awl, the Huffington Post, E! Online, The Daily Beast, and Salon.

She resigned as a staff writer at The Intercept on January 15, 2015, to work for Jezebel; she left in November 2015.

== Early life and family ==
Vargas-Cooper was born in and raised in Los Angeles, California. She is the daughter of author and journalist Marc Cooper and teacher Patricia Vargas-Cooper. She attended UCLA, and graduated summa cum laude in 2007 with a major in history.

== Career ==
After graduating from UCLA, Vargas-Cooper worked as a union organizer and health policy analyst in both Los Angeles and Washington, DC.

In 2009, Vargas-Cooper wrote a memoir/true-crime series on the trials of Jesse James Hollywood that took place in Santa Barbara. It was widely praised and critics said that the series "remind us more than a little bit of Dominick Dunne." In June 2012 ,Vargas-Cooper was one of the first reporters to acknowledge and report on the bath salts crisis in America for Spin magazine. It was praised by The Atlantic for being first and referred to the article as "fascinating".

For Buzzfeed in 2013, Vargas-Cooper wrote an article entitled "What the Language in Abortion Laws Really Means" and revealed that she had had an abortion. In 2013, Freespeech.org praised this article as "great" regarding the "language and nuance behind the restorative policy". In December 2014, Vargas-Cooper published the first interview with Jay from the popular podcast Serial.

On February 27, 2015, Jezebel published an article by Vargas-Cooper falsely reporting that Wisconsin governor Scott Walker's proposed budget would cut funding for sexual assault reporting from the state's universities. The article was widely condemned, and Jezebel subsequently acknowledged that its article had presented "an unfair and misleading picture. We regret the error and apologize." The Daily Beast, which ran an article of its own based on the Jezebel report, likewise backpedaled, saying, "We deeply regret the error and apologize to Gov. Walker and our readers. Our original story should be considered retracted." On Twitter, Vargas-Cooper initially defended the post, claiming that Walker should have been aware of the "optix". Several days, later she admitted, "I screwed up."

In April 2015, also at Jezebel, Vargas-Cooper published the leaked Amazon shopping list of Amy Pascal. There was some backlash as people thought this list violated Pascal's privacy. While working for Vice, Vargas-Cooper published articles regarding women and LGBTQ rights, including "How to Take your Attempted Rapist to Court and Win", "How to Protect your Nude Selfies from Vengeful Ex Boyfriends and Trolls" and "Bye: Scalia: Antonin Scalia's Worst Decisions on the Rights of Women and LGBTQs".

In February 2017, Vargas-Cooper wrote an article in The American Conservative, entitled "Womanhood Redefined", which called transgender women "men who decide to become women" who undergo "surgical mutilation." The New Republic's Jo Livingstone called her essay an "attack on trans people masquerading as an exercise in good faith" and "trans-exclusionary rhetoric."

== Books ==
Her book, Mad Men Unbuttoned: A Romp Through 1960s America, was published by HarperCollins in 2010. The book stemmed from a blog she had started on the Tumblr platform. In 2010, GQ wrote an article calling for an end to Tumblr book deals, but referred to Mad Men Unbuttoned as the exception, "anticipated... a rare bird." The New Yorker judged the book to be "wonderfully diverting" and "well-versed".

== Other works ==
Vargas-Cooper is the creator and host of Public School, a weekly live storytelling series in Los Angeles where writers and performers tell personal stories, based on a theme. Some past participants include Starlee Kine, Paul F. Tompkins, Davy Rothbart, and Julie Klausner.
