= Marc Cooper =

American journalist and educator

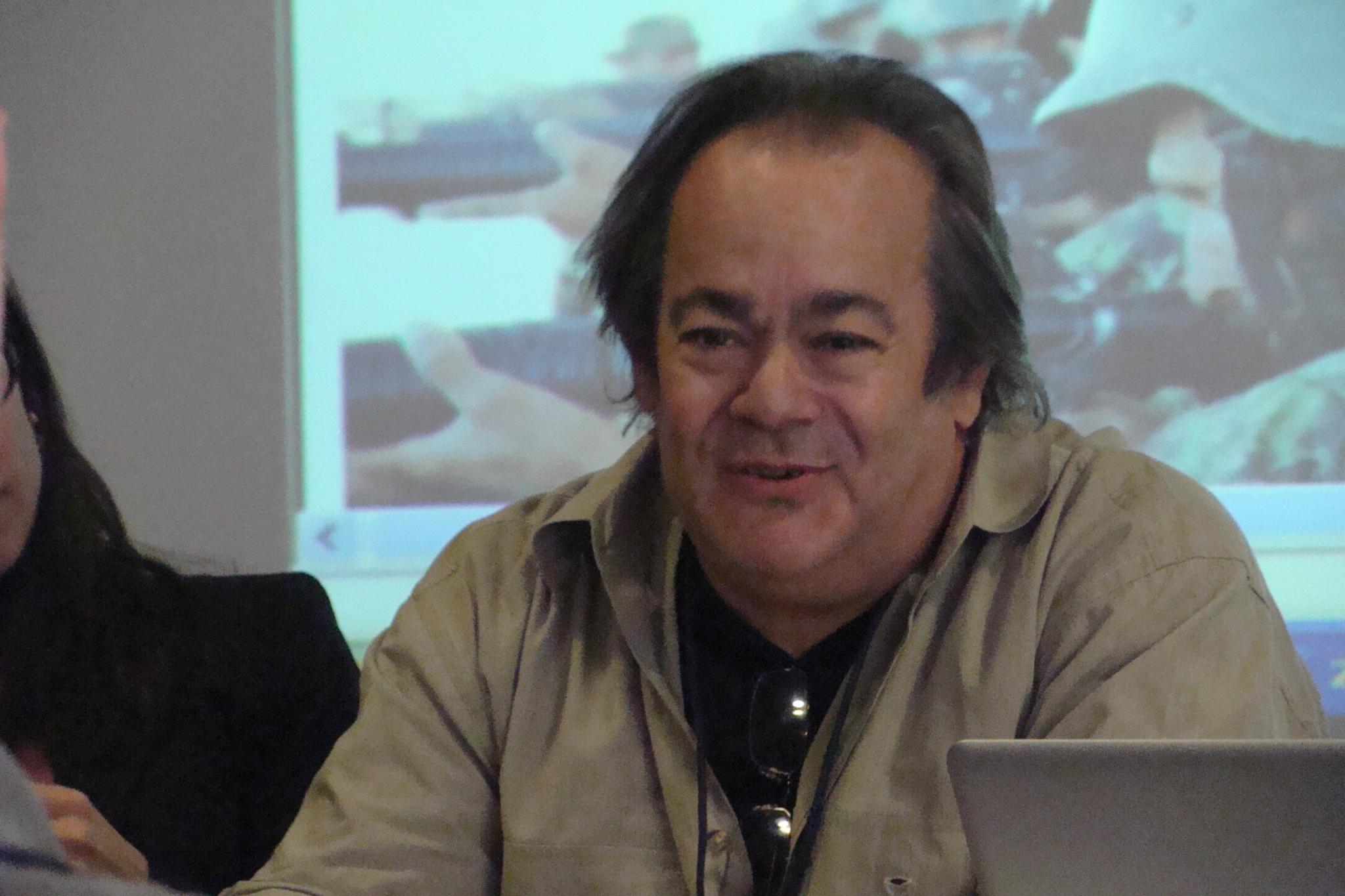
- Marc Cooper during a conference in Santiago, Chile, 2010
- Born: Los Angeles, California, U.S.
- Education: Fairfax High School; San Fernando Valley State College
- Occupations: Journalist; author; professor; blogger
- Spouse: Patricia Vargas-Cooper
- Children: Natasha Vargas-Cooper

Marc Cooper is an American journalist, author, journalism professor and blogger. He is a contributing editor to The Nation. He wrote the popular "Dissonance" column for LA Weekly from 2001 until November 2008. His writing has also appeared in such publications as the Los Angeles Times, The Atlantic Monthly, Harper's Magazine, The New Yorker, The Christian Science Monitor, Playboy and Rolling Stone.

His translated work has been published in various European and Latin American publications, including the French daily Liberation and the Mexico City-based dailies La Jornada and Uno Mas Uno. He has also been a television producer for PBS, CBS News, and The Christian Science Monitor. His radio reports have aired on NBC, Canadian Broadcasting Corporation and the BBC. During the 2008 presidential campaign he worked as editorial coordinator of The Huffington Post's citizen-journalism project OffTheBus as well as a senior editor of the overall site.

== Early life and education ==
Cooper was born in and grew up in Los Angeles. His career in journalism began in 1966 when he founded and edited an underground newspaper at Fairfax High School in Los Angeles, California. Cooper attended San Fernando Valley State College in the 1960s and took part in several protests. In 1971, he was expelled from the California State University system for his antiwar activism by order of Governor Ronald Reagan.

== Chile and Allende ==
From 1971 to 1973, Cooper served as the Spanish-English translator for the democratically-elected Chilean socialist president Salvador Allende. Following the military coup in September 1973, he fled the country, fearing execution as a participant in the Allende government. Some of his American friends were in fact executed by the military regime, including journalist Charles Horman. In 2002, Cooper testified before a Chilean magistrate who was investigating Horman's death.

== Journalism career ==
=== Radio ===
From 1980 to 1983, Cooper was the news and public affairs director of Pacifica Radio station KPFK-FM, Los Angeles. During this period, he also produced and hosted a weekly program that delved into issues of bias in the news media. Between 1998 and 2001, he hosted a daily talk show on KPFK.

Between 1995 and 2005, Cooper served as the principal host and executive producer of Radio Nation, a weekly, syndicated one-hour production of The Nation Institute, featuring writers and editors from The Nation magazine. At its peak, Radio Nation was heard on more than 100 public and community radio stations.

=== Huffington Post ===
Cooper began his own daily blog in 2004. Since May 2005 he has been a contributing blogger at The Huffington Post. During the 2008 campaign he served as a senior editor of the site and also worked as editorial director of its OffTheBus citizen journalism reporting project. The same year he joined the advisory board of Pajamas Media, a weblog-related company. As of July 2007, Cooper is no longer affiliated with Pajamas Media. He left The Huffington Post in December 2008.

=== Academia ===
After teaching for five years as an adjunct professor, Cooper was made a full-time member of the journalism faculty at the USC Annenberg School for Communication for the academic year 2006–2007. He was also promoted to the position of associate director of Annenberg's Institute for Justice and Journalism.

In late 2008, Cooper was named director of Annenberg Digital News and its online publication "Neon Tommy". He also coordinates the USC Annenberg News21 fellowship, which is part of a national Carnegie-Knight initiative for developing innovative journalism. In 2010, Cooper was promoted to Associate Professor of Professional Practice.

== Political views ==
Although Cooper espouses many traditional leftist positions, he also criticizes some of his fellow leftists for what he says is a kneejerk and irrational tendency to support "unworthy" and marginal causes. He ruffled many ideological allies by his criticism of Mumia Abu-Jamal, whom he famously dismissed as "a bad choice for poster-boy of the anti-death penalty movement." Cooper also disparaged Ward Churchill, calling him a "guaranteed loser" who was "an irrelevant and clearly deranged loner on the edge of the looniest left."

Cooper was vocal in his opposition to the 2003 invasion of Iraq and the subsequent occupation, but he has been scathingly critical of other leftist opponents to the war, such as Canadian journalist Naomi Klein, who he lambasted as a "friend" and "apologist" for prominent Iraqi Shiite Islamist Muqtada al-Sadr in response to a piece she wrote for the September 13, 2004 edition of The Nation.

Cooper has also been harshly critical of Venezuelan president Hugo Chávez, whom he regards as a "thug," and very supportive of the Ukrainian Orange Revolution in 2004.

Cooper has criticized the liberal position on gun control, and has written that he is "tired of and deeply annoyed by affluent liberals--living in 6,000-square-foot houses with heated swimming pools, who use a 400-horsepower SUV to drive their kids two blocks to school, with a family carbon footprint that of a small battleship".

Over the past few years Cooper has sharply criticized the Cuban government for its crackdown on internal dissidents—some of whom have been handed stiff sentences for receiving funds and instructions from the United States. Cooper has helped write and circulate international letters of protest defending the locked-up dissidents.

He has described his current political position as "contrarian" and declares himself "agnostic" on grand ideological schemes.

== Recognition ==
Cooper's work has won awards from the Society of Professional Journalists, the PEN American Center, Project Censored, the Armstrong Memorial Foundation, the Sidney Hillman Foundation, the Greater Los Angeles Press Club, the California Associated Press, the California Newspaper Publishers Association, and the Best in the West.

== Personal life ==
Cooper is married to Chilean writer and teacher Patricia Vargas-Cooper and has one adult daughter, Natasha Vargas-Cooper, who studied at UCLA. She graduated in May 2007 and is now a writer and journalist. Her book Mad Men Unbuttoned: A Romp Through America of the 60's was published by Harper Collins in 2010.

== Books ==
Cooper has published three books: Roll Over Che Guevara: Travels of a Radical Reporter (1994), an anthology of his journalistic pieces; Pinochet and Me: A Chilean Anti Memoir (2001) which was an L.A. Times best-seller; and The Last Honest Place in America: Paradise and Perdition in the New Las Vegas (2004).
