= Speak Out Now =

Single by Oh Land

from the album Oh Land
- Released: 28 November 2011
- Recorded: 2011
- Length: 3:28
- Label: Fake Diamond Records
- Songwriters: Nanna Øland Fabricius; Kristian Leth; Fridolin Nordsø
- Producers: Kristian Leth; Fridolin Nordsø

Oh Land singles chronology
"White Nights" (2011)	"Speak Out Now" (2011)	"Renaissance Girls" (2013)

"Speak Out Now" is a song recorded by Danish recording artist Oh Land, taken from the deluxe edition of her eponymous and second studio album (2011). It was released as the album's fifth and final single on 28 November 2011 by Fake Diamond Records. The track was written by Nanna Øland Fabricius, Kristian Leth, and Fridolin Nordsø, with production being handled by the latter two.

"Speak Out Now" divided professional music critics. One critic appreciated Oh Land displaying her "mature" side while a different one found it to be "less interesting" compared to her previous singles. The Euro TV Place listed "Speak Out Now" at number three on their list of the "10 Best Euro TV Theme Songs". Commercially, it peaked at number four in Denmark and was later certified Gold by IFPI Denmark for digital sales exceeding 10,000 units. A music video was also created and features Oh Land performing outside in a forest.

The song serves as the opening and closing theme to the TV 2 Danish television series Rita, which debuted in February 2012.

== Background and development ==
"Speak Out Now" was first released in the United States for digital consumption on 1 January 2011. However, it was not distributed as a commercial single, nor in Oh Land's native Denmark, until 28 November 2011 as a digital download. Both releases were handled by Fake Diamond Records, who had previously distributed the releases for both Oh Land (2011) and her debut album Fauna (2008). On 5 December of the same year, the parent album was reissued in its deluxe edition, featuring three previously unreleased bonus tracks: "Speak Out Now", "Twist", and "En Linedanser". The single was written by Oh Land, Kristian Leth, and Fridolin Nordsø, with production being handled by the latter two. It serves as the opening and closing theme to the Danish TV series Rita, which debuted in February 2012.

== Reception ==
"Speak Out Now" received mixed to favourable reviews from music critics. A reviewer from Scandipop called it "charmingly upbeat and joyful", in addition to naming it the "more mature sister" to album track "We Turn It Up". Becky Bain of Idolator was more mixed, stating that it was less interesting than both "Sun of a Gun" and "White Nights". On a list published by The Euro TV Place, which displays the "10 Best Euro TV Theme Songs" according to the publication, Oh Land's single was placed at number three; the site's consensus reads, "[...] this tune is as peppy and catchy as they come. Anyone who's watched Rita has probably danced to it in her or his seat during the show's title credits."

For the week ending 17 February 2012, "Speak Out Now" debuted on Denmark's Tracklisten chart at number six. The following week, it reached its peak position of number four; including its first appearance on the chart, it spent seven consecutive weeks on their top ten. Furthermore, on the digital component section of the aforementioned chart, which is compiled by Billboard, it debuted and peaked at number four, for the week on 3 March 2012. It lasted an additional six weeks there before departing. On 30 March 2012, "Speak Out Now" was certified Gold in Denmark for digital sales exceeding of 10,000 copies. It was similarly successful on Danish radio stations, where it received significant airplay. It peaked at number eight on Tracklisten's official airplay chart and spent a total of eighteen non-consecutive weeks charting.

== Music video ==
An accompanying music video for "Speak Out Now" was released on 10 February 2012. For the visual, the singer appears in various scenes, including in a forest and in a "flooded greenhouse". The video was highlighted by Eliot Glazer of Vulture.com, who joked "the beautiful Danish weirdo is going through her 'lace phase'"; additionally, the staff at Electronic Beats declared it "stunning". The music video is recorded at Randers regnskov.

== Track listing ==
Digital download
No.	Title	Length
1.	"Speak Out Now"	3:28

== Charts and certifications ==
=== Charts ===
Chart (2012)	Peak position
Denmark (Tracklisten)	4
Denmark Airplay (Tracklisten)	8
Denmark Digital Songs (Billboard)	4

=== Certifications ===
Region	Certification	Certified units/sales
Denmark (IFPI Danmark)	Gold	15,000^{^}
^{^} Shipments figures based on certification alone.

== Release history ==
Region	Date	Format	Label
United States	1 January 2011	Digital download	Fake Diamond Records
Denmark	28 November 2011	Digital download	Fake Diamond Records
