= Earth Sick =

Studio album by Oh Land
- Released: November 11, 2014
- Genre: Pop; synthpop; electropop; indietronica
- Length: 51:20
- Label: Tusk or Tooth

Oh Land chronology
Wish Bone (2013)	Earth Sick (2014)	Askepot (2016)

Singles from Earth Sick
- 1. "Head Up High" Released: 14 October 2014; 2. "Nothing Is Over" Released: 4 November 2014

Earth Sick is the fourth studio album by Danish recording artist Oh Land. It was released on 11 November 2014 by her independent label Tusk or Tooth.

== Background and funding ==
On 28 June 2014, Oh Land revealed plans for her fourth record, which would be recorded in her Brooklyn apartment and crowdfunded in collaboration with PledgeMusic;. 5% of the proceeds would also be donated to Greenpeace's Save the Arctic campaign.

Funders of the project received digital downloads of the album in mp3 or FLAC at $10USD on its release. Larger donations would allow donors to receive physical copies of the album in CD or Vinyl format, signed copies, artwork, clothing, merchandise and experiences with the artist such as a song-writing session.

== Release ==
The album was ultimately titled Earth Sick, and its lead single "Head Up High" was released on 6 October 2014. Oh Land debuted "Head Up High" live on 23 September 2014 on Denmark's Voice Junior, for which she serves as a coach. The music video for "Head Up High" was released on 20 October 2014, with a world premiere on the Nylon website, which described it as "a victorious electro-jam smattered with twinkling bells and grounding percussion" and while that could be used to describe other songs, they felt the new track still demonstrated Oh Land's evolution and maturation as an artist. Nylon also announced that Earth Sick would be released on 11 November 2014 on Oh Land's Tusk or Tooth label. On 27 October, the title track from the album was made available to download for people who had pre-ordered the album on her pledge site, and the following day it was released as the instant download track on other retailers.

== Track listing ==
1. "Machine" – 3:58 (Nanna Øland Fabricius, Daniel "Danny Keyz" Tannenbaum)
2. "Favor Friends" – 3:17 (Nanna Øland Fabricius, Tore Nissen)
3. "Head Up High" – 3:33 (Nanna Øland Fabricius)
4. "Earth Sick" – 4:44 (Nanna Øland Fabricius, Tore Nissen)
5. "Nothing Is Over" – 3:07 (Nanna Øland Fabricius, Negin Djafari)
6. "Doubt My Legs" – 4:31 (Nanna Øland Fabricius, Tore Nissen)
7. "Half Hero" – 3:24 (Nanna Øland Fabricius)
8. "Daylight" – 4:24 (Nanna Øland Fabricius)
9. "Hot 'n' Bothered" – 3:59 (Nanna Øland Fabricius, Tore Nissen)
10. "Little Things" – 3:43 (Nanna Øland Fabricius, Tore Nissen)
11. "Flags" – 3:40 (Nanna Øland Fabricius)
12. "No Particular Order" – 4:18 (Nanna Øland Fabricius)
13. "Trailblazer" – 4:42 (Nanna Øland Fabricius, Tore Nissen, Bendt J. Fabricius)
