= Listen a Little Less =

2021 single by Oh Land

Single by Oh Land
- Released: 26 March 2021
- Length: 3:24
- Label: Tusk or Tooth
- Songwriters: Nanna Øland Fabricius; Adi Zukanovic

Oh Land singles chronology
"Rumskib" (2020)	"Listen a Little Less" (2021)	"Sådan Ligger Landet" (2022)

Music video
- "Listen a Little Less" on YouTube

"Listen a Little Less" is a song recorded by Danish singer and songwriter Oh Land. She wrote the song with her boyfriend, Danish musician Adi Zukanovic, and it was released as a single on 26 March 2021, through Tusk or Tooth Records. Oh Land developed "Listen a Little Less" during a mentally-draining episode in her personal life, and used the song to regain her confidence.

The accompanying music video for "Listen a Little Less" was released on 28 March, and was filmed entirely on a Samsung Galaxy S21 smartphone. The clip originated from a live concert sponsored by Samsung Galaxy, that was held earlier in the month.

== Background and release ==
Oh Land conceived "Listen a Little Less" during the COVID-19 pandemic, in a moment where she "could just feel the weight of the world". Regarding this period, she commented that her daily tasks had become draining and tiring, and that the song served "as a reminder [...] that sometimes I need to listen a little less – to stay on my path, and hold my own." On 10 March 2021, she announced "Listen a Little Less" as her next single, and confirmed its release date for that month. She wrote the song with her boyfriend, Danish musician Adi Zukanovic. In Denmark, it was released for digital download and streaming on 26 March, through Tusk or Tooth Records. Elsewhere, the song was self-released by Oh Land to digital retailers.

== Reception and promotion ==
A critic from Gaffa labelled "Listen a Little Less" as a groovy number from Oh Land. Thomas Treo from Ekstra Bladet noted that despite Oh Land's presence as a judge on the Danish version of X Factor, "Listen a Little Less" underperformed on Spotify during its release week.

"Listen a Little Less" was first performed by Oh Land on 10 March 2021, during a live concert sponsored by Samsung Galaxy. The entire event was filmed using a Samsung Galaxy S21 smartphone, and was previously featured as a full concert on Oh Land's YouTube channel. The portion of the event devoted to "Listen a Little Less" was later utilized as the song's official accompanying music video, and was also uploaded to her channel on 28 March. The clip features Oh Land in a pastel outfit, and appearances from Zukanovic, who performs as a keyboardist, and Hans Hvidberg-Hansen, who plays percussion and drums.

== Release history ==
Release dates and formats for "Listen a Little Less"
Region	Date	Format(s)	Label	Ref.
Denmark	26 March 2021	Digital download; streaming	Tusk or Tooth	
Various (Note: Various regions excluding Denmark.)	26 March 2021	Digital download; streaming	Self-released	
