= I Miss One Week Ago =

Song by Oh Land

Single by Oh Land
- Released: 20 March 2020
- Recorded: March 2020
- Length: 2:54
- Label: Tusk or Tooth
- Songwriter: Nanna Øland Fabricius
- Producer: Adnan Zukanovic

Oh Land singles chronology
"Wishes" (2019)	"I Miss One Week Ago" (2020)	"Julefeber" (2020)

"I Miss One Week Ago" is a song by Danish singer and songwriter Oh Land. It was written, recorded, and released during the month of March 2020, as the effects of the COVID-19 pandemic began internationally, resulting in lockdowns and the promotion of social distancing. The concept for "I Miss One Week Ago" originated as she spent lockdown in her home with boyfriend Adnan Zukanovic, the song's producer. In the lyrics, Oh Land discusses how, prior to the pandemic, the difficulty of her daily struggles paled in comparison to the current day.

When Oh Land digitally released "I Miss One Week Ago", she paired it with its instrumental version so fans could create their own versions of the song. Its live music video features the singer at home performing on the piano. She also performed the song on the Danish television special Danmark står sammen (2020).

== Background and release ==
The song's development began following announcements from the Danish government regarding protocol for lockdowns and social distancing. In the early stages of pregnancy, she took up residence with her boyfriend Adnan Zukanovic and son. To combat feelings of isolation, she found songwriting and the opportunity to "put [..] abstract emotions into sounds" to help. She ultimately wrote "I Miss One Week Ago" the night of the government's first statement. Oh Land's musical endeavors leading up to the release of "I Miss One Week Ago" included her fifth studio album, Family Tree, in 2019, and the holiday-themed single "Wishes".

The song was then sent to digital retailers on 20 March through Tusk or Tooth Records. The single was packaged with its instrumental version so fans could extend the lyrics to "I Miss One Week Ago" and create their own versions. She also intended to repost any cover videos submitted by fans. Oh Land is credited with writing and performing piano on the song, while Zukanovic handled production, mastering, mixing, and performed Casio synths.

== Composition and lyrics ==
"I Miss One Week Ago" primarily features Oh Land layered vocals over a piano. Her lyrics reflect her feelings of isolation and lonesomeness amidst Denmark's response to the COVID-19 pandemic; elaborating, she said that writing the song's lyrics helped her cope with struggles during quarantine. She added: "Every day this past week has felt unreal, and it's been hard to deal with the massive changes. The only way I could cope emotionally was by writing this song. I miss normal. I love normal. And I can't wait for everything to be over." One of her lyrics describes worrying over losing a cell phone, and another about missing an exit while driving. In Jon Pareles' inclusion of the song in a The New York Times article, he remarked: "Cooped-up songwriters are going to write songs, and they're thinking about the same topic as nearly everyone else." He also described her vocals as poised and highlighted its "luminous final ascent". A contributor to WNYC Studios felt that the song did not have her typical "sophisticated arrangements", but wrote: "but here, she chooses, wisely, to go small."

== Reception and promotion ==
Brett Callwood from LA Weekly selected "I Miss One Week Ago" as his "Music Pick" of the week and predicted its then-unreleased live video would be a "delicate treat" for fans.

The same day as the single's release, a live music video for "I Miss One Week Ago" was uploaded to Oh Land's official YouTube channel. She also performed the song on the Danish television special Danmark står sammen the following week. For further promotion, she announced a live streaming event, via YouTube, where she would perform an acoustic version of "I Miss One Week Ago", beginning on 11 April 2020 at 10:00 AM (PT).

== Track listing ==
Digital download/streaming
No.	Title	Length
1.	"I Miss One Week Ago"	2:54
2.	"I Miss One Week Ago" (Instrumental)	2:54

== Credits and personnel ==
Credits adapted from the live video description of "I Miss One Week Ago".

- Nanna Øland Fabricius – writing, piano, choir
- Adnan Zukanovic – production, mastering, mixing, Casio synths

== Release history ==
Release dates and formats for "I Miss One Week Ago"
Region	Date	Format(s)	Label	Ref.
Various	20 March 2020	Digital download; streaming	Tusk or Tooth	
