= Wishes (Oh Land song) =

Single by Oh Land
- Released: 22 November 2019
- Genre: Christmas
- Length: 3:50
- Label: Tusk or Tooth
- Songwriter(s): Nanna Øland Fabricius
- Producer(s): Adi Zukanovic

Oh Land singles chronology
| "Salt (Arthur Moon Remix)" (2019) | "Wishes" (2019) | "I Miss One Week Ago" (2020) |

"Wishes" is a song recorded and written by Danish singer-songwriter Oh Land. It was released as a single on 22 November 2019 through Tusk or Tooth Records.

== Background and release ==
The single cover artwork was created by the Danish graphic design firm Hvass&Hannibal, designers of the cover for Oh Land's third remix extended play, Replanting Family Tree (2019). "Wishes" was released for digital download and streaming in Denmark on 22 November 2019, through Tusk or Tooth Records. Outside of Denmark, the single was self-released by Oh Land to digital retailers.

== Release history ==
Release dates and formats for "Wishes"
| Region | Date | Format(s) | Label | Ref. |
|---|---|---|---|---|
| Denmark | 22 November 2019 | Digital download; streaming | Tusk or Tooth | |
| Various | 22 November 2019 | Digital download; streaming | Self-released | |
