= Love You Better (Oh Land song) =

- Cover used for the 2018 Danish version "Elsker dig mer"

Song by Oh Land

from the album Wish Bone
- Released: 16 September 2013
- Recorded: 2013
- Studio: Chalice Recording Studios (Los Angeles)
- Genre: Acoustic; folk
- Length: 3:43
- Label: Tusk or Tooth; A:larm Music
- Songwriters: Nanna Øland Fabricius; David Poe
- Producer: Nanna Øland Fabricius

"Love You Better" (recorded in Danish and named "Elsker dig mer" in 2018) is a song by Danish singer-songwriter Oh Land for her third studio album, Wish Bone (2013). It was released digitally, along with the rest of the parent album, on 16 September 2013 by Tusk or Tooth Records and A:larm Music. It was written and produced by Oh Land, with David Poe serving as an additional songwriter. An acoustic and folk ballad, "Love You Better" is about learning to love your companion more as you age. The song received generally favourable reviews from music critics who described it as romantic and stark.

Danish filmmaker Kristian Levring filmed and produced a music video for the song after Oh Land expressed interest in collaborating with him. Leth was able to select any song by Oh Land for the clip and he chose "Love You Better". The visual features Oh Land aging in reverse, achieved by the singer wearing tracking devices. Following the release of the video on 21 October 2016, it entered Billboard's Denmark Digital Songs chart at number six. Oh Land re-recorded the song in Danish for her 2018 soundtrack Watermusic; the new rendition features guest vocals from Oliver Arndt de Thurah and was retitled "Elsker dig mer".

== Background and composition ==
"Love You Better" is from Oh Land's third studio album, Wish Bone (2013). The album was released on 16 September 2013 by Tusk or Tooth Records and A:larm Music. The song was written and produced by Oh Land, with David Poe serving as an additional songwriter. Poe played his guitar on the track and Danny Cheung served as the track's sole engineer. According to the singer, "it is a song that means a lot to [her]" because it serves as a "delicate, melancholy ode to wisdom and age". Oh Land spoke regarding the song's meaning and inspiration:

It was written in the L.A. sun on an afternoon with my friend David Poe. We were talking about how you sometimes know that you would be better at love if only you were older. But you can't rush old. You have to be young and dumb and let time do its thing before you get the experience you need to handle love right.

The song itself was recorded at Chalice Recording Studios in Los Angeles. In an interview with Noisey, Oh Land spoke with Kim Taylor Bennett who asked her for further clarification on the lyrics. Bennett interpreted the lyrics as a "girl who is perhaps incapable of love and commitment" but by the end of the song, it is revealed that "it's the guy who is the asshole", to which Oh Land confirmed and said, "Yeah, so it's like, 'fuck you!'". She also described it as a song that "fast-forwards a bit" and inspires her because she believes that she "will do everything better when [she] get[s] older". Oh Land discusses loving someone to a deeper extent as she ages: "I will wrap my arms around you and keep you from the cold / I will love you better when I'm old". Several music critics described "Love You Better" as a ballad. The Guardian's Paul MacInnes called the song an "acoustic ballad", while Leonie Cooper from NME felt it was a "folk ballad".

== Reception ==
"Love You Better" received generally favourable reviews from music critics. Jim Carroll of The Irish Times found the song to be proof of Oh Land's "efforts to find new ground"; he also praised the track for containing "timeless drama" and recommended that readers of his column download the track. James Christopher Monger from AllMusic called the song a "better version" of Oh Land's single "Cherry on Top" (2013) and described it as "stark and surprisingly quaint". Other critics called the track romantic, such as The Guardian's Paul MacInnes who described it as "heart-smooshing" and Leonie Cooper from NME who stated it was "starkly romantic" and called for a "heart-swelling shift in mood" on Wish Bone. Michael Jose Gonzalez, an editor for Gaffa, stated that the song was both beautiful and a delight. Neon Tommy's Jennifer Joh wrote that "Love You Better" and album track "Kill My Darling" were both "dark and calmly chaotic", adding that their "satisfying harmonies [will] make one's head spin". Christopher Monk, a writer for musicOMH, noted that Oh Land's self-produced songs on Wish Bone ("3 Chances" and "Love You Better") are both "pretty", but ultimately she claimed that "they belong on a different album altogether".

Following the release of the official music video on 21 October 2016, "Love You Better" entered the digital component chart in Denmark, which strictly tracks download sales from songs in that country. It debuted and peaked at number six on the list compiled by Billboard on 5 November 2016. It left the chart the following week.

== Music video ==
Approximately three years after the initial release of "Love You Better" and Wish Bone, a music video was created for the song. Oh Land had wanted to collaborate with Danish filmmaker Kristian Levring on several occasions but due to scheduling conflicts they were unable to work together. However, he finally agreed to produce a music video for her in 2016 and she allowed him to pick any song from her catalog for the clip; he ultimately chose "Love You Better". In the video, Oh Land "age[s] slowly in reverses in a surprising, and sometimes unsettling, series of subtle fades". In order to produce the several special effects in the video, the singer wore a series of "3D tracking dots" in order to makes the "transitions [appear] seamless". Oh Land spoke about the filming process: "The video was shoot was fun and challenging because it's sorta shot like stop-motion. We gradually remove prosthetics and makeup for me to get younger and younger." She further predicted that of the several shots, approximately "95 percent" of them featured her in extensive makeup. The video eventually premiered on Oh Land's official YouTube account on 21 October.

== Personnel ==
Personnel adapted from Wish Bone liner notes.

- Nanna Øland Fabricius – vocals, lyrics, production
- Danny Cheung – engineering
- David Poe – production, guitar

== Charts ==
Chart performance for "Love You Better"
Chart (2016)	Peak position
Denmark Digital Song Sales (Billboard)	6
