= Fall to Pieces (album) =

Studio album by Tricky
- Released: 4 September 2020
- Recorded: Berlin
- Length: 28:30
- Label: False Idols
- Producer: Tricky

Tricky chronology
ununiform (2017)	Fall to Pieces (2020)

Fall to Pieces is the fourteenth studio album by English trip hop artist Tricky. It was released on 4 September 2020 via False Idols. It features guest appearances from Marta and Oh Land.

== Critical reception ==
Professional ratings
Aggregate scores
Source	Rating
AnyDecentMusic?	7.7/10
Metacritic	73/100
Review scores
Source	Rating
AllMusic	3.5/5 stars
The Arts Desk	5/5 stars
Clash	7/10
Exclaim!	7/10
The Independent	4/5 stars
Mojo	4/5 stars
Pitchfork	7.6/10
The Times	4/5 stars
Uncut	6/10
Under the Radar	8.5/10

Fall to Pieces was met with generally favorable reviews from critics. At Metacritic, which assigns a normalized rating out of 100 to reviews from mainstream publications, the album received an average score of 73 based on twelve reviews. The aggregator AnyDecentMusic? has the critical consensus of the album at a 7.7 out of 10, based on thirteen reviews. The aggregator Album of the Year assessed the critical consensus as 73 out of 100, based on fifteen reviews.

== Track listing ==
All tracks are written by Adrian Nicholas Matthews Thaws.

No.	Title	Length
1.	"Thinking Of" (featuring Marta)	2:11
2.	"Close Now" (featuring Marta)	1:37
3.	"Running Off" (featuring Oh Land)	1:44
4.	"I'm in the Doorway" (featuring Oh Land)	2:51
5.	"Hate This Pain" (featuring Marta)	3:23
6.	"Chills Me to the Bone" (featuring Marta)	2:16
7.	"Fall Please" (featuring Marta)	2:27
8.	"Take Me Shopping" (featuring Marta)	2:44
9.	"Like a Stone" (featuring Marta)	3:26
10.	"Throws Me Around" (featuring Marta)	3:15
11.	"Vietnam" (featuring Marta)	2:28
Total length:		28:30

== Charts ==
Chart (2020)	Peak position
Belgian Albums (Ultratop Flanders)	35
Belgian Albums (Ultratop Wallonia)	45
Scottish Albums (Official Charts)	29
UK Albums (Official Charts)	69
UK Independent Albums (Official Charts)	3
UK Vinyl Albums (OCC)	6
