= Renaissance Girls =

Single by Oh Land

from the album Wish Bone
- Released: 6 August 2013
- Recorded: 2013
- Genre: Electropop
- Length: 3:09
- Label: Tusk or Tooth; A:larm Music
- Songwriter(s): Nanna Øland Fabricius
- Producer(s): David Andrew Sitek

Oh Land singles chronology
"Speak Out Now" (2011)	"Renaissance Girls" (2013)	"Pyromaniac" (2013)

Music video
- "Renaissance Girls" on YouTube

"Renaissance Girls" is a song by Danish recording artist Oh Land, taken from her third studio album Wish Bone (2013). It was released as the album's lead single on 6 August 2013 by Tusk or Tooth and A:larm Music. The track was written by Nanna Øland Fabricius, while David Andrew Sitek solely produced it. Musically an electropop song, the lyrics discuss finding a balance between societal roles and tasks that a woman might perform, alongside accomplishing her dreams. Oh Land questions why the term "renaissance men" exists when there is no female counterpart.

Oh Land described the writing process as inspiring, and claimed that the single notices what it is like to be a woman in today's society. "Renaissance Girls" was well received by music critics, who appreciated the singer's empowering lyrics. An accompany music video was released on 7 August 2013 and features Oh Land and backup dancers performing choreography within an abandoned warehouse. For the visual, the singer wanted it to be simple yet spontaneous, and features wardrobes provided by fashion designer Phillip Lim.

== Background and release ==
After taking a yearlong hiatus following the release of her eponymous second studio album, Oh Land (2011), she began to start writing and recording new material for an upcoming project. Oh Land enlisted the help of TV on the Radio's David Andrew Sitek, who she praised as a "brilliant instrumentalist"; the pair collaborated for the aforementioned project, which would later become her third record, Wish Bone (2013). The singer billed the record as her "most directly personal album that [she has] done to date", and also claimed that the lyrics stood out for being extremely vulnerable. "Renaissance Girls" was released for digital consumption on 6 August 2013 through Tusk or Tooth and A:larm Music.

"Renaissance Girls" was released on 6 August 2013 as a digital download in her home country of Denmark, through Tusk or Tooth and A:larm Music. In the United States and Europe, it was made available as a 12-inch single and digital download on the same day. A digital extended play featured a remix of the single was released in the same year, on 27 August by Federal Prism Records. A CD single was also issued from the same label in 2013.

== Music and lyrics ==
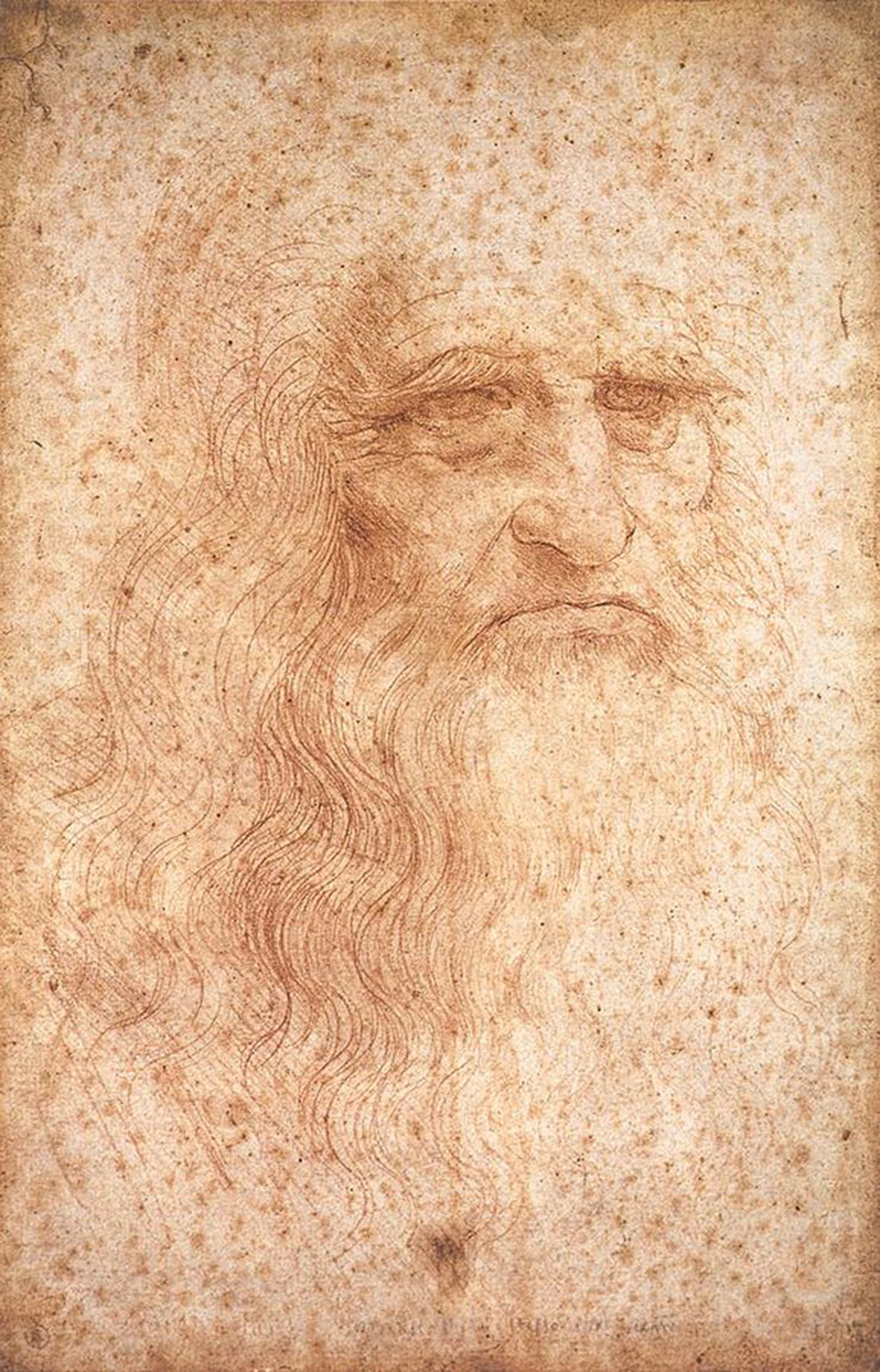
"Renaissance men" is a term used to describe men like Leonardo da Vinci; with "Renaissance Girls", Oh Land questions why a female equivalent term does not exist.

An electropop song, "Renaissance Girls" lasts three minutes and nine seconds. For the track's entire duration, she sings with constant staccato over a furious melody. Michelle Geslani of Consequence of Sound called it an "off-kilter electro-pop [...] girl-power anthem". Geslani stated it was "abuzz with a swarm of busy, twinkling beats". Lyrically, Oh Land sings about performing common household tasks, followed by reaching her goals: "Doing the laundry and planning for the future / Is the nature of a renaissance girl". The singer also claims to giving birth to three children, yet still "remaining a virgin". Oh Land commented on her inspiration in the lyrics of "Renaissance Girls":

The inspiration is taken from my own life, but also all my girlfriends who are very strong, confident girls who want to be their best in all levels of life. They’re kind of like overachievers and never seem to be satisfied with how [much] they achieve in life. I can see that with myself as well because you expect so much from yourself. You expect yourself to be the best friend, have a great career, be really talented and be able to cook—you just have to be great at everything. I think genders have been washed out a little bit -- like you have to have masculine qualities as well as feminine. It’s just a song that recognizes what it takes to be a girl today, and it’s quite a lot.

Additionally, the singer acknowledged that the term "Renaissance Man" is given to artistic individuals like Leonardo da Vinci and Michelangelo, but that the female equivalent has never existed. She claimed the release serves as "an ode" to her friends who are "good at doing everything at once". She speaks of the dedication in lines such as "I can be an engine / Buzzing like a bee / I'm a real independent". Both the lyrics and production were considered reminiscent of Oh Land's previous work, according to Sam Lansky of Idolator.

== Critical reception ==
"Renaissance Girls" received generally favourable reviews from music critics. Geslani from Consequence of Sound applauded the single's message, which she described as: "We can basically do anything we want". A reviewer from CMJ New Music Monthly acclaimed the recording by claiming that "Oh Land might just give Superwoman a run for her money". A critic from Pretty Much Amazing praised Sitek's production on the track, but Slant Magazine's Jesse Cataldo disliked the song, along with album tracks "Bird in an Aeroplane" and "Love a Man Dead". He claimed they all make use of a "shimmering simplicity and hypnotic circularity" formula, that becomes "stale" after a while. On a different note, Kayleigh Watson from Renowned for Sound described "Renaissance Girls" as a highlight, in addition to calling it an "addictively catchy number that calls to the modern, independent woman". Jennifer Joh from Neon Tommy also was positive towards the song, which she found to be "dazzling and exuberant", while James Christopher Monger of AllMusic called it "ultimately infectious".

== Music video ==
An accompanying music video to "Renaissance Girls" was released on 7 August 2013 through YouTube. In the visual, the singer performs choreography alongside a "juxtaposition of dance of scenery". Other scenes display semi trucks and cement mixers driving away from a building that Oh Land and several individuals are dancing in. Fashion designer Phillip Lim lent several outfits of his to Oh Land for the video, which she declared was "so simple and clean, but [it] still has a playfulness to it". The singer commented on the video's synopsis:

We really wanted to do something that just shows who I am. We weren't trying to make a better version of myself. It was really more about fun and being spontaneous. All of the mistakes were allowed to be there, which was the same for the song. The way that the song was recorded was very live. We played everything live, we didn't stop to edit ourselves, it was very intuitive and I wanted the video to have that energy, as well.

The visual opens with a scene of trucks pulling away from a large, brick building. Oh Land is then seen wearing pink overalls entering the building and sitting down in a folding chair towards the center. As the first verse begins, she stands up and dances around the open space, which continues into the chorus. For the second verse, she is joined by four background dancers, who are now sitting in chairs, much like Oh Land. The singer has changed outfits and is now shown knitting. The next scene has the five women standing spaced apart, before they all begin dancing again. Two female children watch the dancers with curiosity. For the song's refrain, Oh Land rides an all-terrain vehicle, before the video concludes with a large group of children joining the women for a final dance.

The video was positively viewed by critics, including by Lauren Musacchio of Rolling Stone, who called the video's storytelling "fun". A reviewer from Baeble Music shared a similar opinion, in addition to praising its playfulness.

== Track listings and formats ==
Denmark Digital download

1. "Renaissance Girls" – 3:09
2. "Renaissance Girls (Yeah, Yeah, Yeah's Remix)" – 3:41

Europe CD single

1. "Renaissance Girls" – 3:09
2. "Renaissance Girls (Nick Zinner Remix)" – 3:41

Europe Digital download

1. "Renaissance Girls" – 3:25

Europe Remix EP

1. "Renaissance Girls (Nick Zinner Remix)" – 3:40
2. "Renaissance Girls" – 3:11
3. "Renaissance Girls (Instrumental)" – 3:09

United States 12-inch single

- A1. "Renaissance Girls" – 3:11
- A2. "Renaissance Girls (Nick Zinner Remix)" – 3:41
- B1. "Renaissance Girls" – 3:11
- B2. "Renaissance Girls (Instrumental)" – 3:09

== Release history ==
Region	Date	Format	Label
Denmark	6 August 2013	Digital download	Tusk or Tooth
United States	6 August 2013	12-inch single	Tusk or Tooth
Europe	6 August 2013	Digital download	Federal Prism
Europe	27 August 2013	Remix EP	Federal Prism
