= Julefeber =

Single by Oh Land
- Language: Danish
- Released: 13 November 2020
- Recorded: 2020
- Genre: Christmas
- Length: 3:27
- Label: Tusk or Tooth
- Songwriters: Nanna Øland Fabricius; Jesper Mechlenburg
- Producer: Adi Zukanovic

Oh Land singles chronology
"I Miss One Week Ago" (2020)	"Julefeber" (2020)	"Rumskib" (2020)

Music video
- "Julefeber" on YouTube

"Julefeber" (English: "Christmas Fever") is a song by Danish singer and songwriter Oh Land. Oh Land wrote the song with Jesper Mechlenburg, composer of the DR1 television series Julefeber (2020). It was written for usage within the series and was released in Denmark as a single on 13 November 2020 through Tusk or Tooth Records, before being released internationally three days later.

== Music video ==
The accompanying music video for "Julefeber" was released to DR1's official YouTube channel on 25 November 2020.

== Charts ==
Chart performance for "Julefeber"
Chart (2020)	Peak position
Denmark (Tracklisten)	19
Denmark Airplay (Tracklisten)	15

== Certifications ==
Certifications for "Julefeber"
Region	Certification	Certified units/sales
Denmark (IFPI Danmark)	Gold	45,000^{‡}
^{‡} Sales+streaming figures based on certification alone.

== Release history ==
Release dates and formats for "Julefeber"
Region	Date	Format(s)	Label	Ref.
Denmark	13 November 2020	Digital download; streaming	Tusk or Tooth	
Various	16 November 2020	Digital download; streaming	Self-released	
