= Wish Bone (album) =

Studio album by Oh Land
- Released: 16 September 2013
- Recorded: 2012–13
- Studio: Chalice Recording Studios (Los Angeles); Crush Studios, Premier Sound (New York City); Federal Prism Studios (Glendale, California); Medley Studios (Copenhagen); Mr. Dans (London); Samurai Hotel Recording (Long Island City, New York)
- Genre: Pop; electronic; indie pop; synth-pop; art pop
- Length: 47:14
- Label: Tusk or Tooth; A:larm
- Producer: Dan Carey; Nanna Øland Fabricius; David Andrew Sitek; WNDRBRD

Oh Land chronology
Oh Land (2011)	Wish Bone (2013)	Earth Sick (2014)

Singles from Wish Bone
- 1. "Renaissance Girls" Released: 20 May 2013; 2. "Pyromaniac" Released: 2 September 2013; 3. "Cherry on Top" Released: 20 April 2014

Professional ratings
Aggregate scores
Source	Rating
Metacritic	72/100
Review scores
Source	Rating
AllMusic	3.5/5 stars
Gaffa	4/5 stars
The Guardian	4/5 stars
Mojo	4/5 stars
Q	4/5 stars
Slant Magazine	2.5/5 stars

Wish Bone is the third studio album by Danish recording artist Oh Land, released on 16 September 2013 by Tusk or Tooth and A:larm Music. The album features production by Oh Land herself, along with David Andrew Sitek of TV on the Radio, Dan Carey and Grant "WNDRBRD" Michaels. It was preceded by the singles "Renaissance Girls" and "Pyromaniac".

== Background and release ==
In 2012, Oh Land announced that she was developing new music in the studio.

On 10 July 2013, the track "My Boxer" premiered on Spin.com as the first taste of the album. "Renaissance Girls" was released as the album's official lead single in Denmark on 20 May 2013 and in the United States on 6 August. The accompanying music video debuted on 6 August 2013 and features Oh Land, along with four backing dancers, dancing in an empty warehouse. "Pyromaniac" was released on 2 September 2013 as the second single from the album.

The New York Times featured Wish Bone on its Press Play blog, previewing several of the tracks on the website.

== Track listing ==
No.	Title	Writer(s)	Producer(s)	Length
1.	"Bird in an Aeroplane"	Nanna Øland Fabricius; David Andrew Sitek	Sitek	4:00
2.	"Renaissance Girls"	Fabricius	Sitek	3:10
3.	"Cherry on Top"	Fabricius; E. Kidd Bogart; Emanuel Kiriakou	Sitek	3:48
4.	"3 Chances"	Fabricius; Julian Bunetta	Fabricius	2:28
5.	"My Boxer"	Fabricius; Dan Carey	Carey	2:50
6.	"Love a Man Dead"	Fabricius	Sitek	3:58
7.	"Next Summer"	Fabricius	Sitek	2:32
8.	"Sleepy Town"	Fabricius; Sitek; David Poe	Sitek	5:00
9.	"Pyromaniac"	Fabricius; Jimmy Harry	Sitek	3:42
10.	"Green Card"	Fabricius; Sia Furler; Grant Michaels	WNDRBRD	4:07
11.	"Kill My Darling"	Fabricius; Michaels	WNDRBRD	3:56
12.	"Love You Better"	Fabricius; Poe	Fabricius	3:43
13.	"First to Say Goodnight"	Fabricius; Sam Farrar	Sitek	4:00

== Personnel ==
Credits adapted from the liner notes of Wish Bone.

- Nanna Øland Fabricius – vocals (all tracks); vocal arrangements (tracks 1–3, 5–13); instruments (tracks 1–3, 6–9, 13); production (tracks 4, 12); executive producer
- b14 – graphic design
- Owen Beverly – guitar, engineering (track 10)
- Dan Carey – engineering, mixing, production (track 5)
- Asger Carlsen – cover photo
- Vincent Chauncey – French horn (track 11)
- Danny Cheung – engineering (track 12)
- Andrew Dunn – trombone (track 11)
- Josh Edmondson – additional engineering (track 10)
- Katrine Muff Enevoldsen – choir singer (track 4)
- Bendt Fabricius – harp and choir arrangement (track 4)
- Steve Fallone – mastering
- Matty Green – mixing (track 2)
- Eske Kath – Wish Bone font, paintings
- Dana Leong – trombone (track 10)
- Farra Mathews – executive production
- Nathaniel Morton – drums (tracks 3, 9)
- Anna Mose – choir singer (track 4)
- Tore Nissen – engineering, mixing (track 4)
- Carolina Parra – piano (track 7)
- David Poe – guitar (track 12)
- Andros Rodriguez – engineering (track 10); mixing (tracks 10, 11)
- Maylen Rusti – choir singer (track 4)
- Michael Shobe – trumpet (tracks 10, 11); brass arrangement (track 11)
- Todd Simon – brass (track 9)
- David Andrew Sitek – instruments, production (tracks 1–3, 6–9, 13); mixing (track 7)
- Zeph Sowers – engineering (tracks 1–3, 6–9, 13); mixing (tracks 1, 3, 6–9, 13)
- David Stoller – engineering (tracks 10, 11)
- Lillian Törnqvist – harp (track 4)
- Qarin Wikström – choir singer (track 4)
- WNDRBRD – engineering, production (tracks 10, 11)
- Sophie Ziedoy – choir singer (track 4)

== Charts ==
Chart (2013)	Peak position
Danish Albums Chart	4
US Heatseekers Albums	32

== Release history ==
Region	Date	Format(s)	Label
Denmark	16 September 2013	CD; digital download	Tusk or Tooth; A:larm Music
Australia	24 September 2013	Digital download	Federal Prism
Germany	24 September 2013	Digital download	Federal Prism
United Kingdom	24 September 2013	Digital download	Federal Prism
United States	24 September 2013	CD; digital download	Federal Prism
Australia	1 November 2013	CD	Federal Prism
United Kingdom	4 November 2013	CD	Federal Prism
Germany	15 November 2013	CD	Rykodisc
