= Head Up High (Oh Land song) =

Single by Oh Land

from the album Earth Sick
- Released: 14 October 2014
- Recorded: 2014
- Studio: Nanna's Apartment (New York City)
- Genre: Dance-pop
- Length: 3:31
- Label: Tusk or Tooth
- Songwriter(s): Nanna Øland Fabricius
- Producer(s): Nanna Øland Fabricius

Oh Land singles chronology
| "Cherry on Top" (2014) | "Head Up High" (2014) | "Nothing Is Over" (2014) |

"Head Up High" is a song by Danish singer-songwriter Oh Land, taken from her fourth studio album Earth Sick (2014). It was released as the album's lead single on 14 October 2014 through Tusk or Tooth Records. The single was written and produced solely by Oh Land. In order to record both the song and the parent album, the singer relied on donations from fans to a PledgeMusic campaign she created. Described as a dance-pop recording, "Head Up High" originated as a song written for a close friend of Oh Land who was having relationship issues.

Noted as a standout track on Earth Sick, "Head Up High" received praise from music critics. Other reviewers noted that the single was interesting and uplifting. An accompanying music video for the track was released onto her Vevo account in October 2014. It was directed by Duncan Winecoff and features Oh Land dancing and singing in a dark studio. A live performance of "Head Up High" was also uploaded onto her Vevo account in March 2015.

== Background and writing ==
In early 2014, Oh Land announced plans to record a fourth studio album in her own New York City apartment in an attempt to "return to her roots". Relying on funding from herself and fans, she set up a PledgeMusic campaign in order to begin work on the project. In exchange, those who donated to the fund would receive autographed CD copies of the then-upcoming album, merchandise such as tote bags and prior albums, and tickets to see an interview with the singer. Oh Land recorded "Head Up High" at her home studio in 2014. She then released the song as the lead single from Earth Sick on 14 October 2014.

On 3 March 2015, Tusk or Tooth Records released a digital EP with six remixes of "Head Up High" produced by MS MR, Penguin Prison, CSS, Lauren Flax, and Mercury. Oh Land described CSS's remix as "more club and minimal" and compared its sound to the music of the 1980s. Reflecting on all six of the remixes, Oh Land claimed that she only asked musicians that she "really admire[s]" to create the mixes. She then stated that she enjoyed listening to what the different musicians could create from her music.

== Composition and lyrics ==
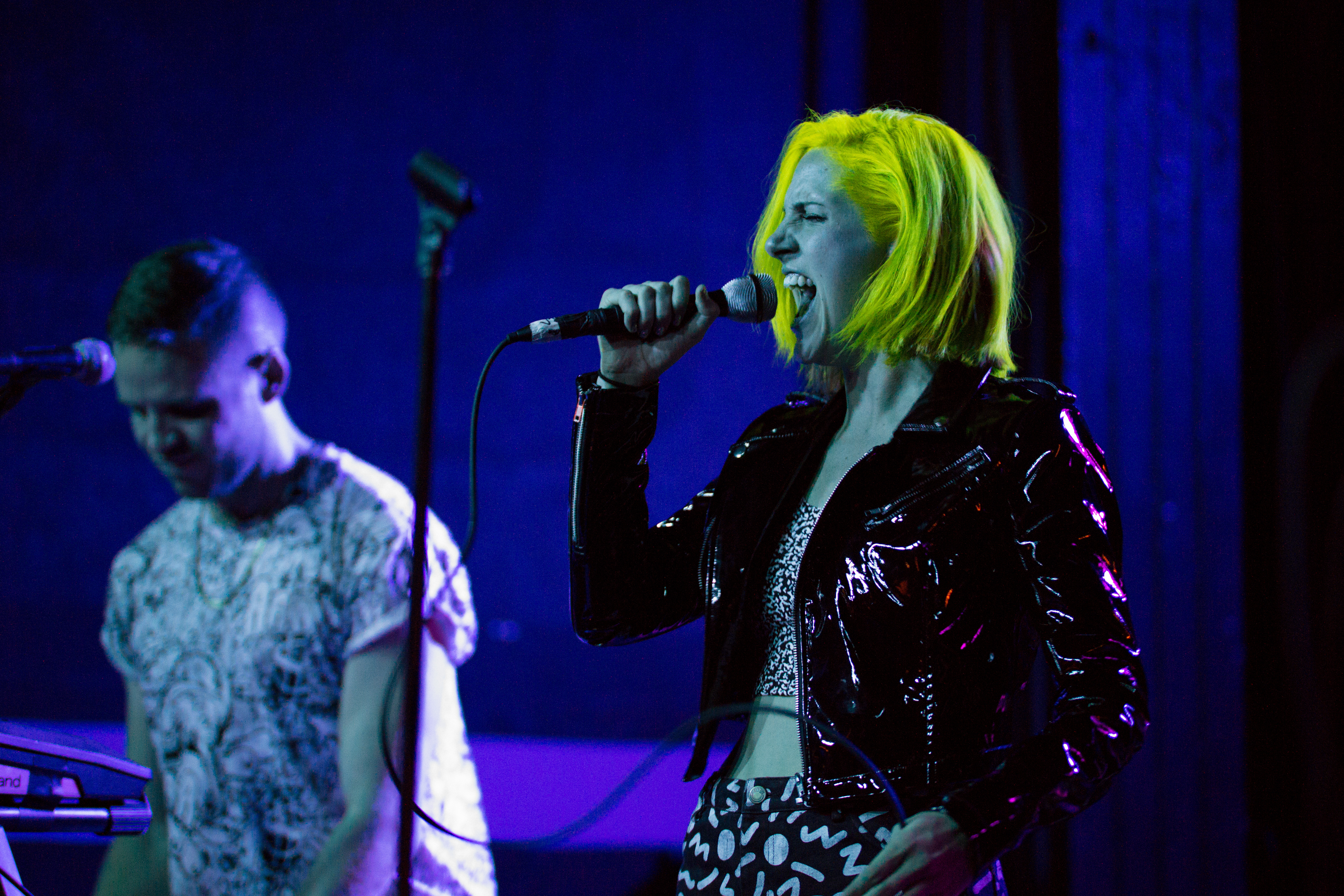
MS MR was one of five artists who created a remix of "Head Up High" for the subsequent remix EP.

"Head Up High" was solely written and produced Oh Land. Tore Nissen, who served as a co-producer on Earth Sick, also co-mastered, co-mixed, and played instruments on the track. Rolling Stone's Kory Grow described its genre as dance-pop and noted the "reedy synths" in the production. In order to achieve the sound heard in "Head Up High", Oh Land used "sound samples from [her] everyday life" and "mixed [them] with string quartet recordings" that were created at her Copenhagen residence. Jason Lipshutz, a writer for Billboard, commented that this effect helped make "an altogether spellbinding effort". Michael Cragg from The Guardian described it as "effortlessly featherlight, symphonic pop with a warm heart".

After learning that a close friend of hers was dealing with issues in her romantic life, Oh Land took it upon herself to write a song that had the power to liberate the friend. However, she forgot about the track until that friend reminded the singer of it nearly an entire year later. Oh Land completed recording the song and decided to include it on Earth Sick. Acknowledging the clichés in the pre-chorus, Michael Cragg remarked that they "somehow sound enriching". The lyrics feature encouraging and helpful mantras: "No heavy rain's going to hold me down any more". The chorus consists of the phrase "high up" sung repeatedly.

== Critical reception ==
General feedback from music critics suggested that "Head Up High" was one of the best tracks on Earth Sick. Billboard's Jason Lipshutz wrote that it was one of two highlights, with the other being "Favor Friends", on the parent album. Kai Hermann, a writer for Nothing but Hope and Passion, found the song to be one of the "very interesting pieces" and "biggest highlights" on Earth Sick. Robin Murray from Clash was pleased with the "euphoric [and] enormously uplifting release" and found that the singer was "pouring her heart and soul into each note"; commenting on the Mercury remix of "Head Up High", she stated it was "packed with colour" and called it an "enormously energetic piece of music aimed straight at the dancefloor".

== Music video and promotion ==
The accompanying music video for "Head Up High" was released onto Oh Land's Vevo account on 20 October 2014. It was directed by frequent collaborator Duncan Winecoff and produced by Oh Land, Winecoff, Stuart Winecoff, Emi Stewart, and Sam Campodonico-Ludwig. The video starts with Oh Land walking down a sidewalk at night. She then enters a small, darkened studio where she is shown dancing and singing. The following scenes display the singer appearing stressed and she eventually places a mask on top of head and grabs a baseball bat. She then proceeds to throw a potted plant and vase of flowers against a brick wall, knock over a glass of orange juice, and smash a desktop computer. The news team behind Nothing but Hope and Passion described the visual as "atmospheric". A live performance of "Head Up High" was also uploaded to the singer's Vevo account on September 25, 2015.

== Track listings and formats ==
- Digital download
1. "Head Up High" – 3:31
- The Remixes EP
1. "Head Up High" (MS MR Remix) – 4:09
2. "Head Up High" (Penguin Prison Remix) – 4:22
3. "Head Up High" (CSS Remix) – 4:13
4. "Head Up High" (Lauren Flax Remix) – 4:20
5. "Head Up High" (Mercury Remix) – 7:31
6. "Head Up High" (Mercury Dub Remix) – 7:31

== Credits and personnel ==
Credits and personnel adapted from Earth Sick liner notes.

Recording

- Recorded at Nanna's Apartment (New York City)

Personnel

- Nanna Øland Fabricius – vocals, lyrics, production, string arrangements, mixing, instruments
- Justin Tyler Close – cover photography
- Marcelo Gomes – cover photography
- Eske Kath – cover illustrations
- Tore Nissen – mastering, mixing, instruments
