= Fauna (Oh Land album) =

Studio album by Oh Land
- Released: 10 November 2008
- Length: 44:05
- Label: Fake Diamond
- Producer: Kasper Bjørke; Anders "Ormen" Christophersen; Oh Land; Peder

Oh Land chronology
Fauna (2008)	Oh Land (2011)

Singles from Fauna
- 1. "Audition Day" Released: 10 November 2008; 2. "Heavy Eyes" Released: 23 February 2009

Fauna is the debut studio album by Danish singer Oh Land. It was released in Denmark on 10 November 2008 by Danish independent label Fake Diamond Records. The album received generally positive acclaim in her home country.

To celebrate 10 years since the release of Fauna, on 10 November 2018, it was released on a 12" limited light blue 180g vinyl, packaged in a gatefold cover and accompanied by a 16-page booklet. The vinyl, including signed versions, was made available via PledgeMusic.

The album's title is a reference to Fauna Groenlandica, a 1780 book written by her great-great-grandfather Otto Fabricius, a missionary and explorer of Greenland.

== Track listing ==
All tracks are written by Oh Land.

Fauna track listing
No.	Title	Length
1.	"Numb"	4:38
2.	"Still Here!"	3:16
3.	"Frostbite"	4:49
4.	"Heavy Eyes"	3:47
5.	"Postpone the Bad"	3:23
6.	"Koo Koo"	1:53
7.	"Audition Day"	3:55
8.	"I Found You"	3:27
9.	"Release Me"	4:38
10.	"Namazu"	3:05
11.	"Alive/Awake"	3:42
12.	"Deep-Sea"	3:32

== Personnel ==
Credits adapted from the liner notes of Fauna.
