= Sun of a Gun =

Single by Oh Land

from the album Oh Land
- B-side: "White Nights"
- Released: 4 October 2010
- Recorded: 2010
- Genre: Europop; synth-pop; dance-pop
- Length: 3:25
- Label: Fake Diamond Records; Sony Music Entertainment
- Songwriters: Jimmy Harry; Nanna Øland Fabricius
- Producer: Dave McCracken

Oh Land singles chronology
"Love Lost City" (2010)	"Sun of a Gun" (2010)	"Wolf & I" (2011)

"Sun of a Gun" is the major-label debut song recorded by Danish recording artist Oh Land. It is taken from her self-titled second studio album Oh Land (2011). It was released as the album's lead single on 4 October 2010 by Fake Diamond Records and Sony Music Entertainment. Elsewhere, the single was released on 24 April 2011 as a CD single and 7-inch single. A Europop and synth-pop song, its lyrics describe a troubled relationship by comparing its effects to the orbit of the Sun. The track was written by Jimmy Harry and Nanna Øland Fabricius, with Dave McCracken solely producing it.

"Sun of a Gun" received positive reviews from critics, who praised its "ready for the dancefloor" theme, in addition to it being a "standout track". In the United States, it garnered commercial success on the Dance Club Songs chart, spending a total of nine weeks on the chart. It also peaked in several European countries, including in Austria, Belgium, Denmark, and Germany. An accompanying music video premiered on 19 October 2010, displaying Oh Land in two different stages of a relationship. It was filmed in Brooklyn and directed by ThirtyTwo. Oh Land performed the song on various occasions, including on an episode of Jimmy Kimmel Live! in March 2011.

== Background and composition ==
"Sun of a Gun" is a synth-pop and Europop song that lasts three minutes and twenty-five seconds. It is composed in the key of E minor using common time with a tempo of 133 beats per minute. It was written by Jimmy Harry and Nanna Øland Fabricius, while Dave McCracken served as the song's executive producer. The song was written while Oh Land was in Los Angeles. Lyrically, the song depicts a relationship by comparing it to the Earth's orbit. In an interview with MTV News, Oh Land described it as a "love story" about "a person who's kind of destructive, but you keep coming back because you can't let it go". She further said it was a "metaphor for how we orbit around the sun": the Sun is a "beautiful thing [...] But it's also something we need to protect ourselves against, because it can burn you."

The song's instrumentation consists of Oh Land's vocals, which range from G_{3} to D_{5}, guitars and a piano. Andrew Leahey from AllMusic commented that the "four-on-the-floor breakup anthem featur[es] snaps, synthesizers, and background vocals that sound like pan pipes". Matthew Perpetua, writing for Rolling Stone, compared its Europop sound to that of Kylie Minogue and Goldfrapp. Sal Cinquemani of Slant Magazine claimed it "juxtaposes a driving 4/4 beat with accompanying madrigal-style vocal harmonies". while Fraser McAlpine of BBC opined that it "appropriates some of the primal chanting and hollering of Tune-Yards, but brings in a big pop chorus".

== Critical reception ==
Following its release, "Sun of a Gun" received generally positive reviews from music critics. When Leahey reviewed the parent album, he stated the single "stand[s] out from the rest of the pack". Robert Copsey for Digital Spy found it a "delicate yet cinematic slice of synth-pop". Andrew Hannah from The Line of Best Fit complimented McCracken's ability "to produce a killer chorus", in addition to "the ability to tell a story, and lift the music away from the dreary conventionality of a song about relationships". A critic from Sunset in the Rearview called the single a "pop winner", while DeShaun Zollicoffer of GeekRevolt labelled it a "stand out track". Additionally, a reviewer from Mixtape Muse found "Sun of a Gun" and album track "Voodoo" good for dancing. On the other hand, in his album review, John Calvert of Drowned in Sound disapproved of the track, stating "[it] is as dated as the album gets, sounding like something Rachel Stevens would've recorded while grinning inanely at a lame kitten".

== Chart performance ==
"Sun of a Gun" is Oh Land's most successful single, entering on several record charts. The single first entered the United States Dance Club Songs chart, peaking at number 12 for the week ending April 9, 2011. It was Oh Land's first and only entry there, lasting a total of twelve non-consecutive weeks on the chart. The song spent six weeks on the chart before departing, only to spend an additional six weeks on the chart following the release of her eponymous album. Elsewhere, it was a sleeper hit, peaking in the majority of its countries in 2012, over a year after its original release. On Belgium's Ultratop 50 Wallonia chart, it peaked at number 43, similarly lasting one week at its position. The track debuted and peaked at number 31 for the week of March 30, according to Denmark's Tracklisten; the following week, it dropped off the charts. It also charted for two weeks in both Austria and Germany, peaking at positions 59 and 60, respectively.

== Music video ==
A music video for "Sun of a Gun", directed by ThirtyTwo, was first released onto Vevo on 19 October 2010. It was filmed in 2010 in Brooklyn, and displays Oh Land in two different themes: dark and light. According to Oh Land herself, she "wanted the video to show the two different states that you can get in when you are in love with someone". The dark side reflects her "desire to protect oneself from being hurt and celebrating independence", while the light side reflects her "desire to be loved and the joys of being in love". The video opens with the dark side of Oh Land, wearing a black dress and extensive eye makeup. She performs the song's choreography atop a cloud-like stage, surrounded by blinking lights. As the track's chorus begins, the light side of Oh Land appears, in a skin-colored dress and longer hair, in front of a screen displaying the sun. The second verse finds her wearing a different black dress, and singing the song by many mirrors; simultaneously, visuals of Oh Land on the ground dancing appear. The following chorus shows the same scenario, but in the same skin-colored dress from earlier. In the song's bridge, both versions of the singer pull a shawl over their head, allowing it to move with the wind. The video concludes with Oh Land closing her eyes as the screen cuts to black.

== Live performances ==
In the United States, Oh Land performed "Sun of a Gun" for the first time in March 2011 on Jimmy Kimmel Live! For the rendition, "a chorus of back-up singers [was] projected behind her on balloons". Matthew Perpetua from Rolling Stone enjoyed the effort, calling it "flashy and stylish". Other performances were at a Billboard promotional effort, and three nightclub shows throughout New York City, immediately following the single's original release.

== Track listings and formats ==
Digital download

1. "Sun of a Gun" – 3:25

Netherlands CD

1. "Sun of a Gun" – 3:25

UK Remix EP

1. "Sun of a Gun" – 3:25
2. "Sun of a Gun (Yuksek Remix)" – 4:26
3. "Sun of a Gun (Savage Skulls Remix)" – 4:37

US Jonathan Peters Remixes

1. "Sun of a Gun (Jonathan Peters Vocal Mix)"
2. "Sun of a Gun (Jonathan Peters Sun Of A Dub)"
3. "Sun of a Gun (Jonathan Peters Radio Edit)"
4. "Sun of a Gun (Original)" – 3:25

US "The Remixes" EP

1. "Sun of a Gun (Ian Pooley Main Mix)" – 6:45
2. "Sun of a Gun (Ian Pooley Dub)" – 6:35
3. "Sun of a Gun (Hoxton Whores Vocal)" – 7:43
4. "Sun of a Gun (Hoxton Whores Dub)" – 6:28
5. "Sun of a Gun (Hoxton Whores Radio)" – 3:51
6. "Sun of a Gun (Kris Menace Remix)" – 6:34
7. "Sun of a Gun (Kris Menace Instrumental)" – 6:28

US 7-inch single

- A1. "Sun of a Gun" – 3:25
- B1. "White Nights (Twin Shadow Remix)" – 4:09

== Credits and personnel ==
Credits and personnel adapted from Oh Land liner notes.

Recording

- Recorded at Mr Dan's, Buckeye, Arizona; Premier Recording Studios, Corby, England; and Secret Frequency Studio, Chicago, Illinois.

Personnel

- Nanna Øland Fabricius – vocals, lyrics, instruments
- Serban Ghenea – mixing
- John Hanes – additional mixing
- Jimmy Harry – music/lyrics
- Mikkel Hess – drums
- Dave McCracken – production, instruments
- Andros Rodriquez – engineering

== Charts ==
Chart (2010–12)	Peak position
Austria (Ö3 Austria Top 40)	59
Belgium (Ultratop 50 Wallonia)	43
Denmark (Tracklisten)	31
Germany (GfK)	60
US Dance Club Songs (Billboard)	12

== Release history ==
=== Process ===
"Sun of a Gun" was released on 4 October 2010 as a digital download in her home country of Denmark. In the United Kingdom and the United States, the download was available on 24 April 2011. Two promotional compact discs with various remixes were also released throughout 2010 and 2011, while a 7-inch single of "Sun of a Gun" was released exclusively in the United States.

=== History ===
Region	Date	Format	Label
Denmark	4 October 2010	Digital download	Fake Diamond Records
United Kingdom	24 April 2011	Digital download	Sony Music Entertainment
