= White Nights (song) =

Single by Oh Land

from the album Oh Land
- Released: 22 May 2011
- Recorded: 2010
- Genre: Synthpop, alternative dance
- Length: 3:45
- Label: Fake Diamond
- Songwriters: Nanna Øland Fabricius, Dave McCracken
- Producer: Dave McCracken

Oh Land singles chronology
"Voodoo" (2011)	"White Nights" (2011)	"Speak Out Now" (2011)

"White Nights" is a song by Danish recording artist Oh Land from her self-titled second studio album, Oh Land (2011). It was released on 22 May 2011, peaking at number thirteen on the Danish Singles Chart, which made it her first top 20 single there.

== Music video ==
The music video for "White Nights" was directed by the film collective Canada and was filmed over a five-day shoot in Barcelona. It premiered on 9 August 2011.

== Media usage ==
It was featured in a 2011 Beavis and Butt-head episode "The Rat" earning the usual blasé response from the duo. It also featured in an episode of Teen Wolf named "The Tell" and an episode of Girls named "Welcome to Bushwick a.k.a. The Crackcident". In 2012, after featuring on Sky Atlantic's Adam Buxton's BUG, "White Nights" was used in the Autumn season Littlewoods television advertisement. A part of the song was also featured in "Dreams Up" by the rapper Hoodie Allen in 2011. It was also featured in a Gossip Girl episode named “Petty in Pink”.

== Track listing ==
- Digital EP
1. "White Nights" – 3:46
2. "White Nights" (Twin Shadow Remix) – 4:08
3. "White Nights" (Max Tundra Remix) – 3:22
4. "White Nights" (Kasper Bjørke Reanimation Short Mix) – 4:26

== Charts ==
Chart (2012)	Peak position
Denmark (Tracklisten)	13
