= Neon Tommy =

Online news publication

- Type: Online news website
- Owner: Annenberg Digital News
- Publisher: University of Southern California Annenberg School for Communication & Journalism
- Founded: Spring 2009
- Ceased publication: Fall 2015
- Language: English
- Headquarters: University of Southern California; Los Angeles, CA; United States
- Circulation: Undisclosed
- Price: Free
- Website: neontommy.com

Neon Tommy was the online news publication sponsored by the Annenberg School for Communication & Journalism at the University of Southern California. It was active from 2009 to 2015.

== Publication ==
Neon Tommy was a web-only student publication of the University of Southern California's Annenberg School for Communication & Journalism. The website was part of the Annenberg Media Center and ended its digital publication in 2015.

The website offered students at the schools a platform through which to learn journalism.

The website was regularly linked to by the Los Angeles Times, L.A. Weekly, LAist, The Huffington Post, Romenesko, Gawker, Yahoo!, CNN, SB Nation and more.

== History ==
The website launched in spring 2009 and received a redesign during summer 2010. The website receives nearly 4 million visitors annually, from more than 120 countries. The publication has produced notable alumni who have gone on to launch successful careers at The Los Angeles Times, The Voice of San Diego, The Atlantic, Yahoo News, and Time Inc.

In 2015, Neon Tommy moved its production offices from the West Wing of the Annenberg School for Communication & Journalism into the Julie Chen/Les Moonves & CBS Media Center inside Wallis Annenberg Hall. It now shares the space with the school's other student media operations, Annenberg TV News and Annenberg Radio News. The publication's principal founder, Marc Cooper, also announced his retirement at the end of the 2014–2015 academic calendar year, marking the end of a successful six-year run as the organization's faculty director.

== Acclaim ==
- Won an L.A. Press Club award in 2010 for its reporting of the local swine flu crisis.
- Won two L.A. Press Club awards in 2011 and received two honorable mentions as well.
- Won 10 L.A. Press Club awards in 2012, including for best sports photo and best online feature.
- Was recognized by the Online News Association for its coverage of a shooting on campus in April 2012 that left two graduate students dead. The National Entertainment Journalism Awards included several Neon Tommy articles among its finalists, including for best online critic.
- Won three L.A. Press Club awards in 2013 for feature writing and sports news, along with six honorable mentions.
- Nominated for two National Arts & Entertainment awards in 2014, for feature writing and industry news.
- Won two L.A. Press Club awards in 2014 for investigative reporting and online news reporting, and two honorable mentions.
- Won SPJ Mark of Excellence Award in 2015 for best online commentary, and was a finalist for best sports reporting.

== Purpose ==
Unlike the Daily Trojan, USC's only student-run newspaper, Neon Tommy received funding by the Annenberg School.

It was operated, edited and managed by undergraduate and graduate students from all disciplines. Annenberg staff and faculty members made hiring decisions and oversaw the digital publication process.
