= Oh Land =

Danish musician and dancer

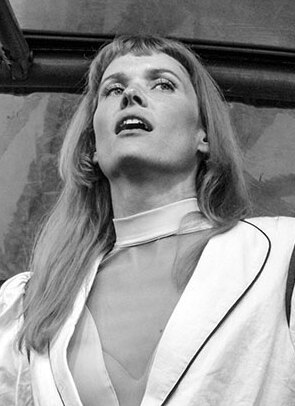
- Oh Land in 2023

Background information
- Born: Nanna Øland Fabricius; 2 May 1985 (age 41); Copenhagen, Denmark
- Genres: Pop; indie pop; synthpop; electronic; experimental
- Occupations: Musician; singer; songwriter; dancer
- Years active: 2008–present
- Labels: Fake Diamond; Epic; Federal Prism; Tusk or Tooth

Nanna Øland Fabricius (born 2 May 1985), known professionally as Oh Land, is a Danish musician, singer, songwriter, and dancer.

== Early life ==
Øland was born in Copenhagen, the daughter of Bendt Fabricius, an organist (not to be confused with the composer Bent Fabricius Bjerre), and Bodil Øland, an opera singer. She is the great-great-grandchild of Lutheran missionary and ethnographer Otto Fabricius, who published Fauna Groenlandica in 1780, the first zoological observations of Greenland. She is a former student of the Royal Danish and Royal Swedish Ballet schools. Her dancing career was ended by injury, a slipped disc and spinal fracture, which eventually led her to start making music.

== Career ==
=== 2008–2011: Debut, Fauna and Oh Land ===
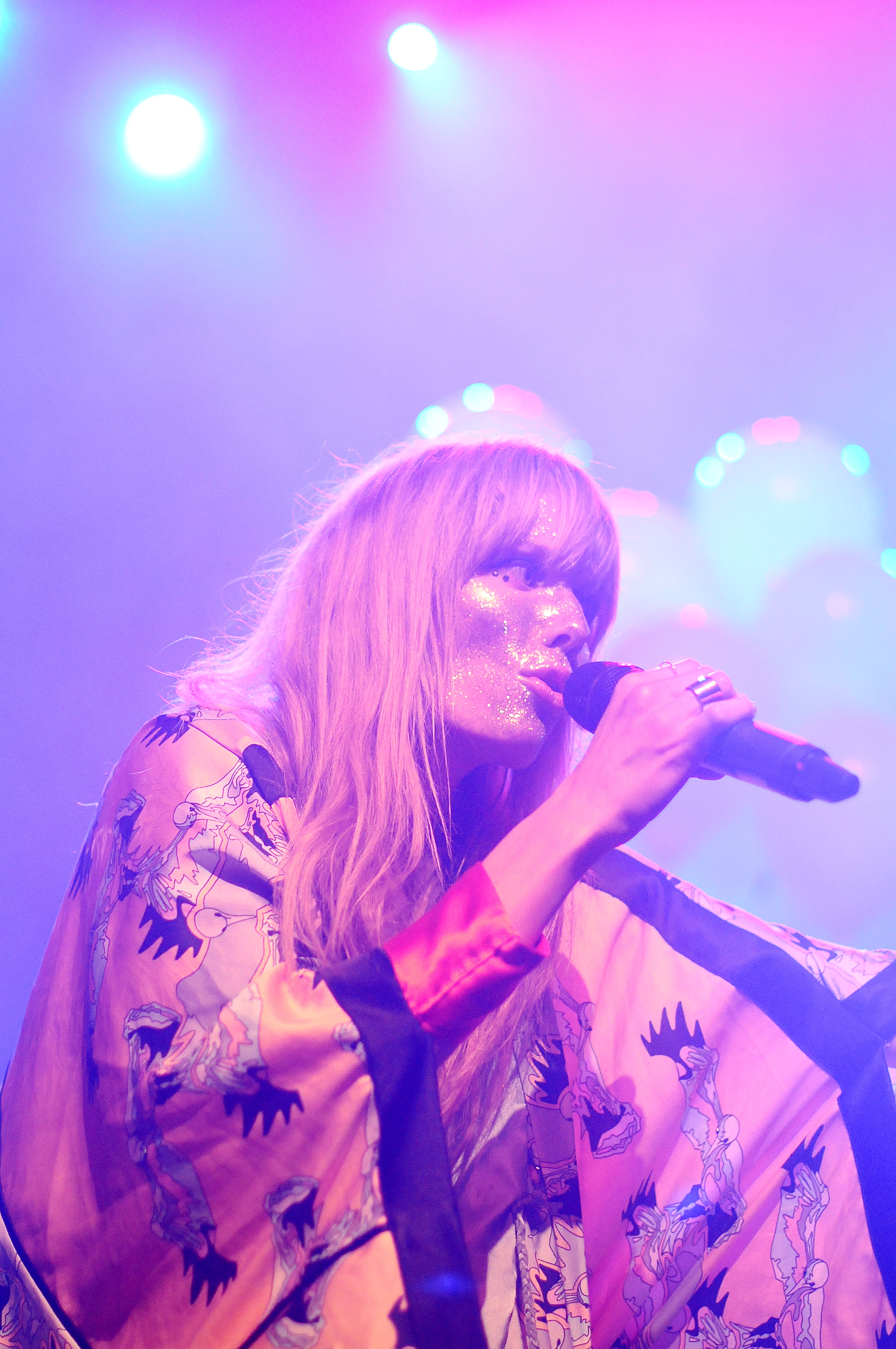
Oh Land performing in Music Box, Los Angeles, in 2011

Oh Land's debut album, Fauna, was released in her native Denmark on 10 November 2008 by Danish independent label Fake Diamond Records. For her eponymous follow-up album, she worked with producers Dan Carey, Dave McCracken and Lester Mendez. The album was released on 14 March 2011 and peaked at number five on the Danish Albums Chart. It also served as her debut in the United States, where it was released on 15 March 2011 by Epic Records, reaching number 184 on the Billboard 200 chart. An EP with the same name was previously released on 19 October 2010, containing four tracks from the full-length album. On 7 April 2011, she was given the Brink of Fame: Music Artist award at the 2011 NewNowNext Awards.

Oh Land made her US television debut performance on Late Show with David Letterman on 2 March 2011 performing her single "Sun of a Gun". She also performed it on Jimmy Kimmel Live! on 24 March 2011 and on The Late Late Show with Craig Ferguson on 25 May. Oh Land toured North America as the supporting act for Orchestral Manoeuvres in the Dark in March 2011, and supported Sia on North American dates of her We Are Born Tour in July and August 2011. She also opened for Katy Perry on select US dates of her California Dreams Tour in August 2011, and joined Perry again in October and November on the tour's second leg in the UK and Ireland. As an actress, Oh Land had a supporting role as Sara in the 2007 Danish psychological drama film Hvid nat. Her song "Speak Out Now" was used as the theme for the TV series Rita starting in 2012.

=== 2012–2013: Wish Bone ===
On 20 May 2013, "Renaissance Girls" was released as the lead single from Oh Land's third studio album, Wish Bone. The album was released in Denmark on 16 September 2013, and in the United States on 24 September via Dave Sitek's boutique label Federal Prism. The second single "Pyromaniac" was released on 2 September 2013. On 20 September, Oh Land kicked off her Wish Bone tour at the Music Hall of Williamsburg. The show featured special guests Sun Rai and (Who Is) Anastasia, who both also appeared with her at Gramercy Theatre on 24 September.

=== 2014: Acting, Voice Junior and Earth Sick ===
Oh Land stars in the 2014 Danish western The Salvation as Marie, alongside Mads Mikkelsen, Eva Green and Eric Cantona, which premiered at the 2014 Cannes Film Festival on 17 May 2014.

On 28 June 2014, Oh Land revealed plans for her fourth record, which would be recorded in her Brooklyn apartment and crowdfunded in collaboration with PledgeMusic; part of the proceeds would also be donated to Greenpeace's Save the Arctic campaign. The album was ultimately titled Earth Sick, and its lead single "Head Up High" was released on 6 October 2014. Oh Land debuted "Head Up High" live on 23 September 2014 on Denmark's Voice Junior, for which she serves as a coach. The music video for "Head Up High" was released on 20 October 2014, with a world premiere on the Nylon website, which described it as "a victorious electro-jam smattered with twinkling bells and grounding percussion" and wrote that the track demonstrated Oh Land's evolution and maturation as an artist. Nylon also announced that Earth Sick would be released on 11 November 2014 on Oh Land's Tusk or Tooth label. On 27 October, the title track from the album was made available to download for people who had pre-ordered the album on her pledge site, and the following day it was released as the instant download track on other retailers.

=== 2015–2020: Soundtracks and Family Tree ===
On 23 November 2015, it was announced that Oh Land was to be the composer for a production of Cinderella at Tivoli Pantomime Theatre, working with Queen Margrethe II as scenographer and the award-winning Russian choreographer Yuri Possokhovs. On 4 November 2016, Oh Land's first soundtrack album, Askepot (Musikken fra forestllingen i Tivolis Pantomime teater), was released digitally.

On 2017 Oh Land collaborated with her then husband, visual artist Eske Kath, on the interactive art exposition "SKIBET", showing at Nikolaj Kunsthal from 23 August 2017 until 7 January 2018. On 30 March 2018 she released the soundtrack album from the exhibition, "Watermusic". In 2018 Oh Land recorded "Der Var Et Yndigt Land", a modified version of Denmark's national anthem, to serve as the theme of the Netflix series The Rain. On 27 May 2018 Oh Land performed at the live-televised 50th birthday celebrations of the Danish Crown Prince. In July 2018 she became an ambassador for WWF's Wild Schoolprojekt and travelled to Kenya as part of the project.

On 11 February 2019 she released the single "Human Error" and announced her new album Family Tree to be released 3 May 2019. That year, she also made her debut as a judge on the twelfth season of Danish TV show X Factor.

Oh Land wrote the music to a musical production of the Hans Christian Andersen fairy tale "The Snow Queen", premiering on 1 December 2019 in Tivoli Concert Hall. This was her second collaboration with Queen Margrethe II, who acted as costume designer.

Oh Land collaborated with British trip hop artist Tricky on his 2020 album Fall to Pieces.

=== 2022–present: Xtra EP and Loop Soup ===
Between 15 May and 4 June 2022 Oh Land played Anna I in the opera Manualen & De syv dødssynder, performed in Danish and German.

On 11 October 2022, Oh Land announced (via Instagram) she was working on an all-Danish EP to be released later that year and an international album coming out in spring of 2023. "Bad Timing" was announced as a Danish single on 19 October, with the EP, Xtra, following on 11 November and featuring including three more tracks.

In June 2023, Oh Land announced a new album Loop Soup would be released in September 2023.

Between 9 and 21 November, a ballet adaptation of Julefeber was performed at the Aarhus Theater with music composed by Oh Land.

== Personal life ==
Øland moved from Denmark to New York City in 2010. She lived in the Williamsburg neighbourhood of Brooklyn. In 2016, she moved back to Denmark.

She married artist and designer Eske Kath in 2013 at a zoo in Denmark. On 14 February 2016 she gave birth to her first son Svend in New York. The family moved to Søborg, a northern suburb of Copenhagen, after Svend was born. The pair subsequently split, with their separation being finalized on 23 October 2018.

She has a small dog named Ujan that travels with her sometimes. On 21 August 2020 Øland gave birth to her second son by her boyfriend, Adi Zukanović, known to the public as Moust; the child's real name remains a family secret. On 19 July 2025 she give birth to her third child and her second with Zukanović, a girl. On 6 December 2025 she revealed that her daughter was treated for a “rare and fast growing” cancer in 2025.

== Musical style ==
In 2011, The Line of Best Fit described Oh Land's music as pop that is both catchy and experimental. The magazine wrote that her vocals have a wide range and go from gentle to soaring. In 2020, Higher Plain Music felt her album Family Tree represented a new direction; more adult while retaining a quirky element. They noted the gospel influence on the vocals and use of orchestral synths.

== Discography ==
- Fauna (2008)
- Oh Land (2011)
- Wish Bone (2013)
- Earth Sick (2014)
- Family Tree (2019)
- Loop Soup (2023)

== Filmography ==
Year	Title	Role	Notes
2007	Hvid nat	Sara	Movie
2009	Store Drømme	Girl in foyer	TV series; 1 episode
2014	The Salvation	Marie Jensen	Movie
2015	Destination Oh Land	Herself	TV mini-series documentary
2018	Som et strejf af en dråbe - Danmark synger farvel til Kim Larsen	Herself	Tribute concert to Kim Larsen
2023	Født i Rampelyset	Herself	TV mini-series documentary
2024	For evigt	Anita	Movie
