= A Ruff Guide =

Compilation album by Tricky
- Released: 27 May 2002
- Recorded: 1994—1999
- Genre: Trip hop
- Length: 1:06:32
- Label: Island

Tricky chronology
Blowback (2001)	A Ruff Guide (2002)	Vulnerable (2003)

Professional ratings
Review scores
Source	Rating
AllMusic	4/5 stars

A Ruff Guide is a compilation album by Tricky, with songs from the albums released during the Island Records period. It was released in 2002. Many of the songs feature vocals by Martina Topley-Bird.

== Track listing ==
No.	Title	Original album	Length
1.	"Aftermath" (version one)	Maxinquaye (1995)	5:04
2.	"Poems" (edit, feat. Terry Hall)	Nearly God (1996)	4:16
3.	"For Real"	Juxtapose (1999)	3:31
4.	"Black Steel" (radio edit)	Maxinquaye	3:42
5.	"Pumpkin" (edit, feat. Alison Goldfrapp)	Maxinquaye	4:07
6.	"Broken Homes" (feat. PJ Harvey)	Angels with Dirty Faces (1998)	3:35
7.	"Wash My Soul"	Juxtapose	3:54
8.	"I Be the Prophet" (with drums)	Nearly God	4:56
9.	"Makes Me Wanna Die"	Pre-Millennium Tension (1996)	4:04
10.	"Tricky Kid"	Pre-Millennium Tension	4:13
11.	"Scrappy Love"	Juxtapose	3:14
12.	"Ponderosa" (original 7" edit)	Maxinquaye	3:32
13.	"Christiansands"	Pre-Millennium Tension	3:54
14.	"Hell Is Round the Corner"	Maxinquaye	3:47
15.	"Singing the Blues"	Angels with Dirty Faces	3:30
16.	"Bubbles" (feat. Terry Hall)	Nearly God	3:28
17.	"Overcome"	Maxinquaye	3:45
Total length:			1:06:32

Bonus tracks
No.	Title	Length
18.	"Aftermath" (I Could Be Looking for People remix)	5:12
19.	"Black Steel" (In the Draw mix)	6:25
Total length:		1:18:09
