= Heroes of Remix =

Sing and dance reality television competition

- Promotional poster, 2016
- Also known as: The Remix
- Genre: Talent show
- Directed by: 车澈
- Presented by: Li Hao (李好)
- Country of origin: China
- Original languages: Chinese; Korean; English
- No. of seasons: 1
- No. of episodes: 11

Production
- Producer: STAR (灿星制作)
- Camera setup: Multicamera
- Running time: 80 minutes

Original release
- Network: Jiangsu Television (2016–Present)
- Release: June 19 – September 4, 2016

Heroes of Remix (Chinese: 盖世英雄), or simply The Remix, is a Chinese sing and dance reality television competition on Jiangsu Television. The show first aired on June 19, 2016, and it is hosted by Li Hao (李好). The mentors of the show include Psy, Leehom Wang, Harlem Yu, and Phoenix Legend.

== Overview ==
The series is based on a similar competition format in Vietnam with the same name. Different from the past variety shows in China, the show features Electronic Dance Music (EDM) marking China's first-ever variety show featuring the music genre.

With the introduction of EDM in the western world, the show hopes to extend its possibilities of electronic music-making in China. According to People's Daily's music producer Liu Zhou (刘洲), "In China, the development of EDM somewhat lags behind, and we are not able to keep up with industry trends. If everyone else is making electronic music but we are not, we will stay behind." In this sense, Heroes of Remix aims to introduce the real meaning of EDM to its viewers, particularly to the Chinese people.

In contrast to the popular belief that EDM is all about being 'fast-tempo nightclub tunes' only, the show would bring about the 'true essence of electronic music' in the context of Chinese music. However, since EDM is defined as "...one of the most transportable" by Forbes Magazine, not only will the performers bring elements of Chinese traditional culture into the remixes of their songs but they are also welcome to incorporate other traditional cultures from other countries. In this way, they would be producing new and creative remixes of their songs.

== Format ==
Heroes of Remix highlights the performers' and mentors' talents in producing Chinese EDM music. Performers (bands or soloists) would perform their own rendition to their song choice under the guidance of their mentors. They are welcome to interpret and remix the songs in any way possible. Audience would then vote for their winning group/soloist by the end of each show.

== Development ==
In April 2016, Chinese-American singer-songwriter Leehom Wang was confirmed to join Heroes of Remix together with South Korean singer-songwriter and rapper Psy. The two already met once during the 2012 Mnet Asian Music Awards in Hong Kong. On May 12, the variety show held a press conference in Zhuhai. It was reported that the show would provide virtual reality (VR) content and production. Star Media CEO Tian Ming said that VR content would allow viewers to fully experience the backstage activities in their perspective and be able to interact with the artists/performers, which is different from traditional television. Five days after, it was announced that the variety show was set to air in June on Jiangsu TV. By then, Chinese music duo Yangwei Linghua and Zeng Yi, and Chinese singer-songwriter Harlem Yu have been announced as mentors already.

== Mentors and performers ==
The mentors of Heroes of Remix

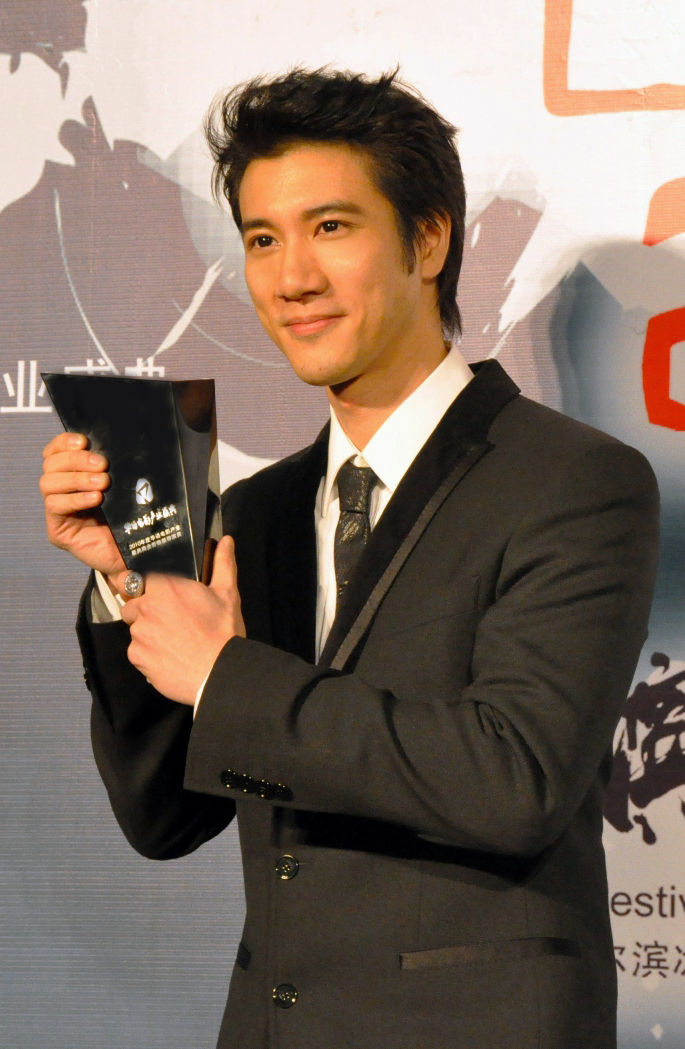
Leehom Wang

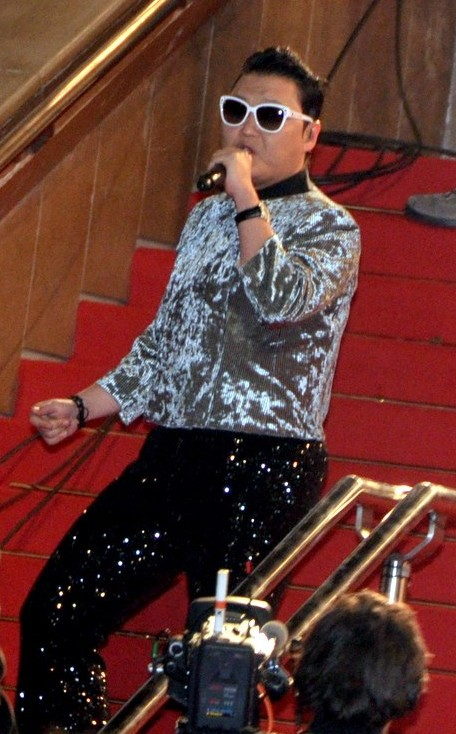
Psy

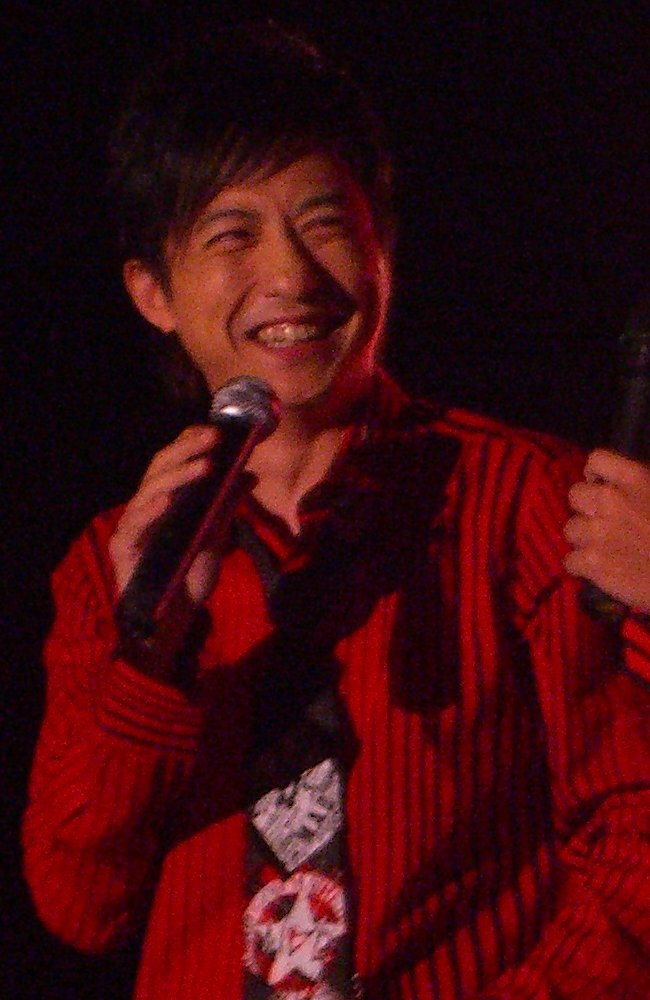
Harlem Yu

Mentors and their respective teams in Heroes of Remix
Mentor	Team members
Leehom Wang	Joyce Chu; Summer (吉克隽逸); William Wei; Li Qi (李琦)
Psy	iKon; SNH48; G.E.M. (邓紫棋)
Harlem Yu	Wu Mochou; Liu Meilin (刘美麟); VIXX; Zhang Wei (张玮)
Phoenix Legend	Danny Lee and Ivy; Monsta X; VC组合; Wowkie Zhang (大张伟)

== Episode overview ==
Color key

Winner of the week
Runner-up of the week

=== Episode 1 (June 19) ===
On its first episode, two of the mentors performed an opening number. Leehom Wang sang "蓋世英雄" ("Gai Shi Ying Xiong") first, then followed by Psy singing "Daddy" and "Gangnam Style". After their performance, four mentors were introduced and the performances commenced.

Order	Mentor	Artist/Group	Song Choice		
Order	Mentor	Artist/Group	Title	Original Artist	Remixer
1	Phoenix Legend	Danny Lee and Ivy	"十面埋伏"	S.H.E	
2	Harlem Yu	Wu Mochou	"快乐组曲"	Harlem Yu	
3	Psy	SNH48	"The Moon Represents My Heart"	Teresa Teng	Psy
4	Leehom Wang	Joyce Chu	"I Miss U"	Joyce Chu	Cazzette
5	Phoenix Legend	Monsta X	"Love" (爱)/"Moves like Jagger"	Xiao Hu Dui/Maroon 5	Punchsound
6	Harlem Yu	Liu Meilin	"Secret Fragrance" (暗香)	Sha Baoliang	
7	Psy	iKon	"Beijing Beijing"	Wang Feng	Psy
8	Leehom Wang	Summer	"蜕化"	Summer	

=== Episode 2 (July 3) ===
Phoenix Legend's Danny Lee and Ivy were the first ones to perform this week again. Last week's winner, iKon then performed second with only three members. Wang's Summer, who performed last, received the highest number of votes by the end of the show.

Order	Mentor	Artist/Group	Song Choice		
Order	Mentor	Artist/Group	Title	Original Artist	Remixer
1	Phoenix Legend	Danny Lee and Ivy	"Kiss"/"Messy Hair" (头发乱了)	Prince/Jacky Cheung	
2	Psy	iKon	"A Better Tomorrow" (奔向未来的日子)	Leslie Cheung	Psy
3	Leehom Wang	Joyce Chu	"Look Over Here, Girl" (對面的女孩看過來)	Richie Jen	
4	Harlem Yu	VIXX	"Xi Shua Shua" (嘻唰唰)	The Flowers	Melodesign
5	Psy	G.E.M.	"Like You" (喜欢你)	G.E.M.	
6	Harlem Yu	Wu Mochou	"Bad Boy"	A-mei	
7	Phoenix Legend	VC组合	"魅影流声"		Kaka
8	Leehom Wang	Summer	"Still Loving You" (依然爱你)	Leehom Wang	Trouze

=== Episode 3 (July 10) ===
This week marks the first time the audience would vote twice: one for the first half of the show and another for the second half. Last week's winner, Summer, performed first this week. William Wei, who performed for the first time, performed with his mentor, Leehom Wang. Meanwhile, iKon received their second win for their "Rhythm Ta"/"Master Zhou" performance.

Order	Mentor	Artist/Group	Song Choice		
Order	Mentor	Artist/Group	Title	Original Artist	Remixer
1	Leehom Wang	Summer	"Jai Ho"	The Pussycat Dolls	
2	Psy	G.E.M.	"Rose, Rose I Love You" (玫瑰玫瑰我爱你)/"Eyes, Nose, Lips"	Yao Lee/Taeyang	
3	Phoenix Legend	Danny Lee and Ivy	"Let Me Go Wild On Snow" (快让我在这雪地上撒点野)	Cui Jian	
4	Harlem Yu	Wu Mochu	"五环之歌"	MC HotDog	
5	Harlem Yu	VIXX	"Wolf" (狼)		
6	Phoenix Legend	Monsta X	"男儿当自强"	George Lam	DJ Tak
7	Leehom Wang	William Wei	"Jiangnan" (江南)	JJ Lin	
8	Psy	iKon	"Rhythm Ta"/"Master Zhou" (周大侠)	iKon/Jay Chou	Psy

=== Episode 4 (July 17) ===
Last week's winner, iKon, opened the competition. On the other hand, Liu Meilin was asked to repeat her performance due to some unfortunate circumstances.

Order	Mentor	Artist/Group	Song Choice	
Order	Mentor	Artist/Group	Title	Original Artist
1	Psy	iKon	"Friend"	Wakin Chau
2	Phoenix Legend	Monsta X	"In That Distance Place" (快乐组曲)	Tong Li
3	Leehom Wang	Summer	"我等的花儿都谢了"	Jacky Cheung
4	Harlem Yu	Liu Meilin	"36 Tricks of Love" (爱情三十六计)	Jolin Tsai
5	Leehom Wang	William Wei	"Tsunami" (海啸)	
6	Phoenix Legend	Danny Lee and Ivy	"Why Are The Flowers So Red" (花儿为什么这样红)	刀郎
7	Psy	G.E.M.	"The Brightest Star in the Night Sky" (夜空中最亮的星)	Escape Plan
8	Harlem Yu	VIXX	"Enraptured" (眉飞色舞)/"独一无二"	Sammi Cheng

=== Episode 5 (July 24) ===
Last week's winner VIXX was the first one to perform this week, while Wowkie Zhang debuted in the show. Also, iKon won for the third time after performing Park Jin-Young's "Honey" and dancing to the tune of Michael Jackson's "Billie Jean".

Order	Mentor	Artist/Group	Song Choice	
Order	Mentor	Artist/Group	Title	Original Artist
1	Harlem Yu	VIXX	"Those Years" (那些年)	Hu Xia
2	Phoenix Legend	Danny Lee and Ivy	"Ghost" (鬼)	
3	Psy	iKon	"Honey"/"Billie Jean" inst.	Park Jin-young/Michael Jackson
4	Leehom Wang	William Wei	"Freedom" (自由)	Tong Li
5	Psy	SNH48	"Little Apple" (小苹果)/"Gentleman" inst.	Chopstick Brothers/Psy
6	Phoenix Legend	Wowkie Zhang	"Lake Road Children" (葫芦娃)	
7	Harlem Yu	Liu Meilin	"山歌好比春江水"	刘三姐
8	Leehom Wang	Summer	"Fool" (傻瓜)	Landy Wen

=== Episode 6 (July 31) ===
Three-time winner iKon opened the show with David Tao's "Love is Very Simple". On the other hand, Liu Meilin received her first win.

Order	Mentor	Artist/Group	Song Choice	
Order	Mentor	Artist/Group	Title	Original Artist
1	Psy	iKon	"Love is Very Simple" (爱很简单)	David Tao
2	Phoenix Legend	VC组合	"Fragrance of Roses" (玫瑰香)	Sandy Lam
3	Leehom Wang	Summer	"Light" (光)	Rocket Girls
4	Harlem Yu	VIXX	"Fated" (命中注定)	Harlem Yu
5	Phoenix Legend	Wowkie Zhang	"Love is Like Tidal Wave" (爱如潮水)	Jeff Chang
6	Harlem Yu	Liu Meilin	"Katyusha" (喀秋莎)	Russian folk song
7	Psy	SNH48	"So Cheerful" (倍儿爽)/"Gangnam Style"	Wowkie Zhang/Psy
8	Leehom Wang	Joyce Chu	"Dark Sky" (天黑黑)	Stefanie Sun

=== Episode 7 (August 7) ===
South Korean group iKon was the first one to perform for the second consecutive time. However, they lost to first-time winners Danny Lee and Ivy.

Order	Mentor	Artist/Group	Song Choice	
Order	Mentor	Artist/Group	Title	Original Artist
1	Psy	iKon	"Kiss Goodbye"	Leehom Wang
2	Leehom Wang	Joyce Chu	"雨中即景"	Liu Wen-cheng
3	Harlem Yu	Liu Meilin	"Sky" (天空)	Faye Wong
4	Phoenix Legend	Monsta X	"Meteor Rain" (流星雨)/"我的未来不是梦"	F4/Chang Yu-sheng
5	Harlem Yu	Wu Mochou	"I Can't Have Your Love" (得不到你的愛情)	Yao Lee
6	Phoenix Legend	Danny Lee and Ivy	"Orchids" (兰花草)	Timi Zhuo
7	Psy	SNH48	"You Exist In My Song" (我的歌声里)	Wanting Qu
8	Leehom Wang	Summer	"Dawn" (晨曦)	

=== Episode 8 (August 14) ===
After his two weeks of absence, Wang's William Wei was the first one to perform. Also from team Wang, Li Qi, who performed for the first time, ended this week's competition.

Order	Mentor	Artist/Group	Song Choice	
Order	Mentor	Artist/Group	Title	Original Artist
1	Leehom Wang	William Wei	"Only One" (唯一)	Leehom Wang
2	Phoenix Legend	Danny Lee and Ivy	"I Miss You" (我好想你)/"Empire State of Mind"	Sodagreen/Jay-Z ft. Alicia Keys
3	Harlem Yu	VIXX	"Chained Up"/"Thank You For Your Love" (谢谢你的爱)	VIXX/Nicholas Tse
4	Psy	iKon	"Exist" (存在)	Wang Feng
5	Phoenix Legend	Wowkie Zhang	"北京小妞" / "新长征路上的摇滚"	Zheng Yajie/Cui Jian
6	Psy	SNH48	"Up & Down"/"Superstar"	EXID/S.H.E
7	Harlem Yu	Liu Meilin	"Late Autumn" (秋意浓)	Jacky Cheung
8	Leehom Wang	Li Qi	"Cliff" (悬崖)	Fifi Wong

=== Episode 9 (August 21) ===
In this episode, a number of performers were not present, particularly the South Korean acts. Psy's appearance was notably blurred out as well. However, three new artists performed for the first time including Queen T, Zhang Wei, and girl group MG女团. There were only seven performances all in all.

Order	Mentor	Artist/Group	Song Choice	
Order	Mentor	Artist/Group	Title	Original Artist
1		Queen T	"不见不散"/"Every Breath You Take"	李汉颖/The Police
2	Harlem Yu	Liu Meilin	"沧海一声笑"	Samuel Hui
3	Leehom Wang	William Wei	"Tenderness" (溫柔)	Mayday
4	Phoenix Legend	Danny Lee and Ivy	"PLAY 我呸"/"Bad Girls"	Jolin Tsai/M.I.A.
5	Harlem Yu	Zhang Wei	"The Fox (What Does the Fox Say?)"	Ylvis
6	Leehom Wang	Li Qi	"我的天空"/"Just a Dream"	NZBZ (南征北戰)/Nelly
7		MG女团	"Legend" (传奇)	Faye Wong

=== Episode 10 (August 28) ===
Seven artists performed this week. By the end of the performances, Wang received his third win as a mentor.

Order	Mentor	Artist/Group	Song Choice	
Order	Mentor	Artist/Group	Title	Original Artist
1	Leehom Wang	Li Qi	"Ten Years" (十年)	Eason Chan
2	Phoenix Legend	VC组合	"Did You Ever Loved Me" (是否爱过我)	Sun Nan
3	Harlem Yu	Liu Meilin	"The Most Dazzling Folk Style" (最炫民族风)	Phoenix Legend
4	Phoenix Legend	Danny Lee and Ivy	"Ninja" (忍者)	Jay Chou
5		Queen T	"Nunchucks" (双截棍)	Jay Chou
6	Harlem Yu	Zhang Wei	"Lift Up Your Veil" (掀起你的盖头来)	Uyghur traditional song
7	Leehom Wang	William Wei	"Goodbye Kiss" (吻别)	Jacky Cheung

=== Golden Music Festival (September 4) ===
Order	Mentor	Artist/Group	Song Choice	
Order	Mentor	Artist/Group	Title	Original Artist
1	Leehom Wang	William Wei	"Goodbye Kiss" (吻别)	Jacky Cheung
2	Leehom Wang	Summer	"Still Loving You" (依然爱你)	Leehom Wang
3	Phoenix Legend	Danny Lee and Ivy	"Orchids" (兰花草)	Timi Zhuo
4	Harlem Yu	Liu Meilin	"Katyusha" (喀秋莎)	Russian folk song
5	Phoenix Legend	Wowkie Zhang	"人间精品起来嗨"	Various Artists
6	Leehom Wang	Li Qi	"我的天空"/"Just a Dream"	NZBZ (南征北戰)/Nelly

==== Opening medley ====
Order	Mentor	Artist/Group	Song Choice	
Order	Mentor	Artist/Group	Title	Original Artist
1	Phoenix Legend	VC组合	"Silent" (默)	Na Ying
2		MG女团	"Pass Me The Mic" (我的麦克风)/"Fire" (火)	Will Pan/A-mei
3	Leehom Wang	Liu Meilin	"Hidden Fragrance" (暗香)	Sha Baoliang
4	Phoenix Legend	Danny Lee and Ivy	"十面埋伏"	S.H.E
5	Phoenix Legend	Wowkie Zhang	"Lake Road Children" (葫芦娃)	

== Results ==
The table below shows the number of times contestants win per week:

Contestant	Mentor	Record Set		Weeks Won
Contestant	Mentor	Win	Runner-up	Weeks Won
iKon	Psy	3	1	Week 1; Week 3; Week 5
Summer	Leehom Wang	1	2	Week 2
VIXX	Harlem Yu	1	1	Week 4
Liu Meilin	Harlem Yu	1	–	Week 6
Danny Lee and Ivy	Phoenix Legend	1	–	Week 7
Wowkie Zhang	Phoenix Legend	1	1	Week 8
Li Qi	Leehom Wang	1	–	Week 9
William Wei	Leehom Wang	1	–	Week 10

== Controversies ==
In the ninth episode, August 21, a number of performers were not present, particularly performers from South Korea. Psy's appearance was blurred out while he was also removed from the program's official website. The ongoing Terminal High Altitude Area Defense (THAAD) issue wherein Chinese Foreign Minister Wang Yi expressed concerns against the deployment of THAAD in South Korea that could jeopardize China's "legitimate national security interest" may be the reason.
