= The Process (Jon Batiste, Chad Smith and Bill Laswell album) =

Studio album by Chad Smith, Bill Laswell, Jon Batiste
- Released: November 4, 2014
- Recorded: 2013
- Genre: jazz-funk, hip-hop, avant-garde jazz
- Label: M.O.D. Technologies
- Producer: Bill Laswell

Bill Laswell chronology
The Dream Membrane (2014)	The Process (2014)

The Process is a 2014 album recorded by a supergroup of musicians that consists of Red Hot Chili Peppers drummer Chad Smith, bassist/producer Bill Laswell and jazz pianist Jonathan Batiste. The album was recorded in 2013 as a musical score for a film that had yet to be written and never ended up being made. The album also features guest appearances by Tunde Adebimpe of TV on the Radio, Wu-Tang affiliate Killah Priest, avant-garde jazz musician Peter Apfelbaum, and avant-garde jazz trumpeter Toshinori Kondo, among others.

== Track listing ==
1. "B1"
2. "Drop Away"
3. "Timeline"
4. "Haunted"
5. "B2"
6. "Turn on the Light/Ascent"
7. "Black Arc"
8. "Spiral"
9. "B3"
10. "Time Falls"
11. "The Drift"

== Personnel ==
Taken from information on the

Musicians

- Jon Batiste – piano, electric piano, Hammond organ, electronic keyboards, harmonaboard, percussion
- Chad Smith – drums, percussion
- Bill Laswell – basses, guitar, electronics

Additional Personnel

- Tunde Adebimpe – vocals on "Drop Away"
- Killah Priest – vocals on "Turn on the Light/Ascent"
- Garrison Hawk – vocals on "Turn on the Light/Ascent"
- Toshinori Kondo – trumpet on "Haunted"
- Peter Apfelbaum – flute & tenor saxophone on 6 & soprano saxophone on "The Drift"
- Dominic James – guitar on "Black Arc" and "The Drift"
