= Slave to the Rhythm =

Slave to the Rhythm may refer to:

- Slave to the Rhythm (album), a 1985 album by Grace Jones
  - "Slave to the Rhythm" (Grace Jones song)
- "Slave to the Rhythm" (Michael Jackson song)
- Slave to the Rhythm (book), a 1997 book by Liz Jones
- "Slave to the Rithm", a song from the album Odyssey (Illenium album) by Illenium
