= Skilled Mechanics =

Studio album by Tricky
- Released: 22 January 2016
- Genre: Trip hop
- Length: 34:13
- Label: False Idols; !K7 Records
- Producer: Tricky; DJ Milo; Ivy 艾菲; Xdare

Tricky chronology
Adrian Thaws (2014)	Skilled Mechanics (2016)	ununiform (2017)

Skilled Mechanics is a studio album by English trip hop artist Tricky. It was released on 22 January 2016 via False Idols/!K7 Records. It features contributions from Luke Harris, DJ Milo, Ann Dao, Francesca Belmonte, Han Xingzhou, Ivy 艾菲, Oh Land, Renata "Xdare" Platon and Wim Janssens.

== Critical reception ==
Professional ratings
Aggregate scores
Source	Rating
Metacritic	68/100
Review scores
Source	Rating
AllMusic	4/5 stars
Drowned in Sound	7/10
No Ripcord	8/10
Q	3/5 stars
Record Collector	2/5 stars
Resident Advisor	2.8/5
The Spill Magazine	3/5 stars
The Arts Desk	4/5 stars
The Guardian	3/5 stars
The Line of Best Fit	8.5/10

Skilled Mechanics was met with generally favorable reviews from critics. At Metacritic, which assigns a normalized rating out of 100 to reviews from mainstream publications, the album received an average score of 68 based on nine reviews.

== Track listing ==
No.	Title	Writer(s)	Producer(s)	Length
1.	"I'm Not Going" (featuring Oh Land)	Adrian Nicholas Matthews Thaws	Tricky	2:53
2.	"Hero"	Thaws; Milo McKenzie Johnson	Tricky; DJ Milo	2:23
3.	"Don't Go"	Thaws	Tricky; DJ Milo	3:12
4.	"Beijing to Berlin" (featuring Ivy 艾菲)	Thaws; Deng Wanxing	Tricky; Ivy 艾菲	2:52
5.	"Diving Away"	Porno for Pyros	Tricky	2:09
6.	"Boy"	Thaws	Tricky	2:54
7.	"Bother"	Corey Taylor	Tricky	2:24
8.	"How's Your Life"	Thaws; Larry Carlton	Tricky; DJ Milo	2:59
9.	"Here My Dear"	Thaws	Tricky; DJ Milo; Chembakwe Johnson; Tyler Sheppard Morris	2:38
10.	"We Begin" (featuring Francesca Belmonte)	Thaws; Francesca Belmonte	Tricky	1:35
11.	"Well"	Thaws	Tricky	2:50
12.	"Necessary"	Thaws; Milo Johnson	Tricky; DJ Milo	3:35
13.	"Unreal"	Renata Platon	Xdare	1:48
Total length:				34:13

=== Charts ===
Chart (2016)	Peak position
Belgian Albums (Ultratop Flanders)	127
Belgian Albums (Ultratop Wallonia)	108
