= Túwaqachi (The Fourth World) =

Studio album by Bill Laswell
- Released: November 27, 2012
- Studios: Orange Music, West Orange, NJ
- Genres: Ambient, sound collage
- Length: 59:01
- Label: M.O.D. Technologies
- Producer: Bill Laswell

Bill Laswell chronology
Means of Deliverance (2012)	Túwaqachi (The Fourth World) (2012)	The Dream Membrane (2014)

Túwaqachi (The Fourth World) is the eighteenth solo album by American composer Bill Laswell, released on November 27, 2012 by M.O.D. Technologies. It was composed by Laswell as an alternative film score to Godfrey Reggio's 1982 experimental film Koyaanisqatsi. With the blessing of the director, an edited version of the film along with the alternative score are intended to be played together in a live setting.

== Track listing ==
All music is composed by Bill Laswell.

No.	Title	Length
1.	"Totoka"	3:03
2.	"Kwatoko"	0:24
3.	"Wikima"	1:15
4.	"The Upper Air"	1:29
5.	"Oraibi"	1:40
6.	"Pamösi"	1:24
7.	"Waki"	1:50
8.	"Pátuwvotah"	4:29
9.	"Pávati"	2:17
10.	"Kwátoko" (Part 2)	1:02
11.	"Wikima" (Part 2)	0:59
12.	"Panaiyoikyasi"	2:23
13.	"Cloud House"	0:59
14.	"Wénima"	2:33
15.	"Totoka" (Part 2)	3:12
16.	"Waki" (Part 2)	2:37
17.	"Solstice"	3:54
18.	"Pátuwvotah" (Part 2)	1:36
19.	"Cloud House" (Part 2)	2:51
20.	"Migration"	12:53
21.	"Wénima" (Part 2)	6:20

== Personnel ==
- James Dellatacoma – assistant engineer
- Bill Laswell – bass guitar, drum programming, effects, producer
- Robert Musso – engineering

== Release history ==
Region	Date	Label	Format	Catalog
United States	2012	M.O.D. Technologies	Digital download	MOD0011
