= Vulnerable (Tricky album) =

Studio album by Tricky
- Released: 19 May 2003
- Genre: Avant-pop
- Label: Epitaph
- Producer: Tricky

Tricky chronology
Blowback (2001)	Vulnerable (2003)	Knowle West Boy (2008)

Vulnerable is the sixth album by English trip hop artist Tricky, released in 2003 on the Epitaph record label.

== Album production ==
The main female collaborator on this album was the Italian singer Costanza Francavilla, a previous fan who approached Tricky at one of his shows and gave him a CD with songs. "On the 17th of December 2001, Tricky, one of Costanza's favourite artists ever, came to play in Rome," Costanza's Official site reads. "Costanza managed to give Tricky's drummer a demo CD (with 3 songs written, performed and produced by her). The day after Tricky called her asking to work with her the collaboration started."

In Spring 2002 she moved to Los Angeles to begin recording Vulnerable. During the summer 2002 her song "My Head" was part of Tricky's Blowback limited re-edition. In summer 2003, Costanza performed live on Tricky's "13" tour all around Europe (including the Glastonbury Festival and the London Meltdown Festival). In fall 2003 the Back to Mine compilation dedicated to Tricky came out featuring Costanza's song "Desire" (written, performed and produced by Costanza).

== Critical reception ==
Professional ratings
Aggregate scores
Source	Rating
Metacritic	60/100
Review scores
Source	Rating
AllMusic	3/5 stars
Blender	4/5 stars
Mojo	3.5/5 stars
Pitchfork	4.9/10
Q	2/5 stars
Rolling Stone	2/5 stars
Spin	B+
Slant Magazine	3/5 stars
Stylus Magazine	C−
Uncut	4/5 stars

Describing Vulnerable as Tricky's best album in years and a major improvement on Blowback (2001), Uncut said that the album "benefits hugely from two major developments: an appropriate vocal foil in the form of Italian vocalist Constanza Francaville, and a set of 13 avant-pop gems evocative of Pere Ubu and Talking Heads." The reviewer deemed it to be a "varied and effective collection of subtly shaded poptones, with the occasional moment of characteristic grit", and commented that, unlike Tricky's other albums since Pre-Millennium Tension (1996), "highlights reveal themselves instead of forcing the listener to pan for them".

Stylus Magazine's Scott McKeating deemed it "sonically lighter than a lot of previous work, the live sounding electric and acoustic guitars making it slightly more accessible to those not used to hearing the squonks, drones and buzzing fridge effects of usual Tricky productions. Someone would be hard pressed to tell instrumental versions of many of these tracks from any old Max Martin filler track (Backstreet b-sides, early Britney album tracks) as they’re almost flimsily throwaway creations; dull, flat and lifeless." He dismissed the music for being "bleached of its individuality and character", and considered Francavilla to be "a very average milk-and-water vocalist".

== Track listing ==
1. "Stay"
2. "Antimatter"
3. "Ice Pick"
4. "Car Crash"
5. "Dear God" (XTC cover)
6. "How High"
7. "What Is Wrong"
8. "Hollow"
9. "Moody"
10. "Wait for God"
11. "Where I'm From"
12. "The Lovecats" (The Cure cover)
13. "Search, Search, Survive"

Limited edition DVD

1. Vulnerable movie
2. "Antimatter" (Jimmy & T Remix)
3. "Receive Us" (Radagon & Tricky)
4. "You Don't Wanna" (live in Rome)
5. Photo gallery

== Charts ==
Chart performance for Vulnerable
Chart (2003)	Peak position
Australian Albums (ARIA)	86
Austrian Albums (Ö3 Austria)	67
Belgian Albums (Ultratop Flanders)	21
Belgian Albums (Ultratop Wallonia)	28
French Albums (SNEP)	22
German Albums (Offizielle Top 100)	65
Italian Albums (FIMI)	66
Swiss Albums (Schweizer Hitparade)	27
UK Albums (Official Charts)	88
