= The Dream Membrane =

Studio album by David Chaim Smith/Bill Laswell/John Zorn
- Released: September 30, 2014
- Recorded: June 2014
- Genres: Drone, dark ambient
- Length: 47:49
- Label: Tzadik
- Producer: Bill Laswell

Bill Laswell chronology
Túwaqachi (The Fourth World) (2012)	The Dream Membrane (2014)	The Process (2014)

John Zorn chronology
Myth and Mythopoeia (2014)	The Dream Membrane (2014)

The Dream Membrane is a collaborative album by Bill Laswell, David Chaim Smith and John Zorn. It was released on September 30, 2014 by Tzadik Records.

== Track listing ==
No.	Title	Lyrics	Music	Length
1.	"The Dream Membrane"	David Chaim Smith	Bill Laswell and John Zorn	47:49

== Personnel ==
Adapted from The Dream Membrane liner notes.

Musicians

- Bill Laswell – bass guitar, drone, producer
- David Chaim Smith – spoken word
- John Zorn – alto saxophone, shofar, executive producer

Technical personnel

- Heung-Heung Chin – design
- James Dellatacoma – engineering
- Scott Hull – mastering

== Release history ==
Region	Date	Label	Format	Catalog
United States	2014	Tzadik	CD	TZ 4004
