= Blowback (album) =

Studio album by Tricky
- Released: 26 June 2001
- Studios: Candy Sound, Durban Studios, Ocean Way, Sarm West, Wonder Station
- Genres: Rap rock; pop; funk rock; dancehall
- Length: 58:36
- Labels: ANTI-; Hollywood
- Producer: Tricky

Tricky chronology
Juxtapose (1999)	Blowback (2001)	Vulnerable (2003)

Singles from Blowback
- 1. "Evolution Revolution Love" Released: 2001; 2. "You Don't Wanna" Released: 2002

Blowback is the fifth studio album by English rapper and producer Tricky. It was released on 26 June 2001.

== Background ==
The album features more accessible, popular song structures than his previous records. Tricky later said he "did Blowback for the money, basically 'cause I was broke". He recorded the album with guest musicians, including Red Hot Chili Peppers members Flea, Anthony Kiedis, Josh Klinghoffer, and John Frusciante; Cyndi Lauper, Alanis Morissette, Ed Kowalczyk, Mark Thwaite of the Mission, and less known artists such as Hawkman, Stephanie McKay and Ambersunshower. "I turned up at the studio and nothing was written," Morissette recalled. "We just worked on it there. He's a very funny man."

== Critical reception ==
Professional ratings
Aggregate scores
Source	Rating
Metacritic	65/100
Review scores
Source	Rating
AllMusic	3/5 stars
Encyclopedia of Popular Music	4/5 stars
Entertainment Weekly	B+
The Guardian	4/5 stars
NME	6/10
Pitchfork	3.1/10
Q	4/5 stars
Rolling Stone	3.5/5 stars
Spin	5/10
The Village Voice	A

Blowback received generally positive reviews from critics, although many of Tricky's longtime fans disliked it. According to Encyclopedia of Popular Music writer Colin Larkin, it was hailed as Tricky's best record since his 1995 debut Maxinquaye, while PopMatters critic Jeffrey Thiessen later called it "a great pop album nobody liked". Simon Price regarded Blowback as Tricky's best album since 1996's Pre-Millennium Tension and "his most accessible since Maxinquaye." He wrote in his review for The Independent at the time that the artist's move to New York "away from the petty politics of the music business" had resulted in "a dark, dense album of future-funk and deep dub". In The New York Times, Neil Strauss called it a radical departure from previous Tricky records, "direct and upfront, the poppiest production Tricky has ever mustered". The Indianapolis Star described it as Tricky's attempt to "prove there's at least one more rap-rock album that's worth a listen". Writing for The Guardian, Dave Simpson was surprised by how "deliriously uplifting, even humorous", the music was, while encompassing "everything from rap-metal (of which there's lots...) to ragga, US power-pop, granite beats, supernatural ambience and even New Romantic. At the same time, it is uniquely, inimitably Tricky."

Some reviewers were more critical. The Wire said while "some of it is just odd enough to work", the album's fusion of hip-hop, electro, dancehall, and, "most problematically, stadium alt.rock" proved to be an intriguing but frustrating listen. NME magazine's Sarah Dempster was disappointed in Tricky's choice of guest artists, who she felt came off as "market-friendly gimmicks, novelties that will afford his selective ramblings a wider audience". While viewing it as further evidence of Tricky's evolution from trip hop toward becoming "some sort of rap-pop revolutionary", Pitchfork's Brent DiCrescenzo found much of the music "horrible" and plagued by the musician's poor lapses in creative judgment, particularly his duets with Anthony Kiedis and Ed Kowalczyk.

Blowback was named the fourth best album of 2001 by Village Voice critic Robert Christgau. In retrospect, he viewed it as Tricky's most "songful" release, one that was "criminally neglected" by listeners. Bill Friskics-Warren later said Blowback was "an album of funk-rock by way of dancehall reggae" that relied on mainstream-rock guest performers but did not "forego incisiveness for accessibility, resistance for appeasement".

== Track listing ==
1. "Excess" – 4:43 (with Alanis Morissette)
2. "Evolution Revolution Love" (with Ed Kowalczyk and Garrison Hawk) – 4:09
3. "Over Me" – 2:57
4. "Girls" – 4:21 (with Anthony Kiedis)
5. "You Don't Wanna" – 5:25
6. "#1 Da Woman" – 2:40 (with John Frusciante)
7. "Your Name" – 3:35
8. "Diss Never (Dig Up We History)" – 2:50
9. "Bury the Evidence" – 4:51
10. "Something in the Way" – 3:24 (Nirvana cover)
11. "Five Days" – 4:19 (with Cyndi Lauper)
12. "Give It to 'Em" – 3:04
13. "A Song for Yukiko" – 4:10

== Charts ==
=== Weekly charts ===
Chart (2001)	Peak position
Australian Albums (ARIA)	28
Austrian Albums (Ö3 Austria)	5
Belgian Albums (Ultratop Flanders)	27
Belgian Albums (Ultratop Wallonia)	29
Dutch Albums (Album Top 100)	43
Finnish Albums (Suomen virallinen lista)	29
French Albums (SNEP)	16
German Albums (Offizielle Top 100)	48
Italian Albums (FIMI)	21
New Zealand Albums (RMNZ)	22
Norwegian Albums (VG-lista)	29
Swiss Albums (Schweizer Hitparade)	33
UK Albums (OCC)	34
US Billboard 200	138

=== Year-end charts ===
Chart (2002)	Position
French Albums (SNEP)	148

== Sales ==
As of September 2003 it has sold 95,000 copies in United States according to Nielsen SoundScan.
