= Garrison Hawk =

- Born: 23 October 1978 (age 47)
- Origin: Mandeville, Jamaica
- Genres: Reggae, dancehall
- Years active: late 1990s–present
- Labels: M.O.D. Technologies, Warner Music, Palm Pictures, AV8

Garrison Hawk (also known as "Hawkman"; born 23 October 1978) is a Jamaican singer and dancehall artist. He is best known for his work on Tricky’s 2001 album Blowback. Tricky praised the collaboration, telling Billboard magazine, "Hawk is my partner, musically. It's almost like my career is changing, and I am finding all the right people to work with." In the same year, he collaborated with Tool, adding a rap part over the intro of "Reflection" during their tour with Tricky.

Born in Mandeville, Jamaica, Hawk was a teenager when he moved with his family to the Bronx, New York, where he cultivated a distinctive singing and rapping style. He started performing with local sound systems, and eventually shared a stage with Shabba Ranks and Super Cat on an East Coast tour in the late '90s. After releasing a series of underground singles—including "3 the Yard Way," with DJ Excel, and "Addicted" (the flip side to "An It Don’t Stop" by Smoothe da Hustler)—he received significant airplay on New York’s Hot 97 radio station and broke through on several club charts in Europe. In 1999, he was approached by producers Roger Sanchez and Armand Van Helden to perform on some club mixes for the AV8 label. In 2001, he collaborated with Tool, adding a rap part over the intro of "Reflection" during their tour with Tricky.
