= Galtres Parklands Festival =

Galtres Parklands Festival was an English live music, arts, beer and family festival that took place annually at Duncombe Park, Helmsley over the August bank holiday weekend until 2014. Headliners in 2014 include Tricky, Morcheeba, Bellowhead, Levellers, and The Human League.

Founded in 2005 originally as a real ale and music festival in Crayke, North Yorkshire, Galtres Parklands Festival increased in attendance capacity to 10,000 and grew to incorporate an entertainment programme on eight stages featuring dance, theatre, family entertainment, spoken word and music, with the music programme combining local and regional talent with international artists. Galtres Parklands Festival has featured headline performances from acts including The Stranglers, Maxïmo Park, Adam Ant, The Charlatans, Buzzcocks, Ash, Billy Bragg, Lloyd Cole, British Sea Power and The Undertones.

Galtres Parklands Festival was owned by The Galtres Festival Charitable Foundation, registered by the Charity Commission for England and Wales and was run under licence by Crucial Events Promotion.

== History ==
=== 2005-2009: Founding and expansion of programming ===
The event now known as Galtres Parklands Festival originated in 2005 as 'The Crayke Village Real Ale Festival'. Re-branded in 2006 as 'The Galtres Festival' - a reference to the festival site's location within the boundaries of the historical Forest of Galtres - the event grew in scale steadily from 2006 to 2009, building the music, food, dance and family entertainment programmes. Throughout this period the annual festival took place at progressively larger sites in Huby, Sutton-on-the-Forest and Crayke.

=== 2010-2012: Increase in attendance and higher profile performers ===
Galtres Festival moved to a 5,000-person capacity site in Crayke in 2010. This period in the festival's history saw the booking of higher profile performers including The Lightning Seeds, Dodgy and The Beat; and a rebrand of marketing materials by design agency Lazenby Brown. This stage of growth saw the event progress from being a regional event to one with national profile. The York ArtsBarge Project teamed up with Galtres in 2010, adding a new vein of underground music and cabaret to the programme which to many became central to the whole event.

=== 2013-2015: 'Galtres Parklands Festival' rebrand and bankruptcy ===
In 2013, the festival moved to a new 10,000-person capacity site in the grounds of Duncombe Park, an historic country estate near Helmsley, North Yorkshire, overlooking the North York Moors National Park. The move was accompanied with a re-brand from 'Galtres Festival' to 'Galtres Parklands Festival'. Performers booked to perform at Galtres Parklands Festival 2014 included Tricky, Morcheeba, Bellowhead, Levellers and The Human League. The 2014 festival lost money and a new cashless payment system left traders owed up to £120,000 by festival organisers. The festival company went into administration in September 2014 and a 2015 relaunch was also cancelled.

== Ethos ==
Galtres Parklands Festival is widely regarded as a genuinely family-friendly event, and features an extensive programme of interactive 'family' activities. In both the procurement of food and drink, and the booking of non-profile performers for the event, the organisers positively discriminate in favour of local suppliers and performers. and the event's environmental concerns include an urban tree planting programme funded by ticket purchasers in partnership with Treemendous York.

== Reviews ==
The Festival has been nominated for several UK Festival Awards.

The Guardian writer Simon Godley wrote of the 2012 festival: "Despite its emphasis upon being all things local it manages to maintain a wider global perspective without lapsing into parochialism. It is an end result which is achieved by a collective vision, detailed planning and organisation and nigh on perfect execution."

The Festivals for All website described Galtres as "a splendid festival and up there as one of the best events of its size in the UK. ... a true celebration of talent, imagination, creativity and professionalism."
