= Means of Deliverance =

Studio album by Bill Laswell
- Released: October 16, 2012
- Recorded: Orange Music, West Orange, NJ
- Genre: New-age
- Length: 45:02
- Label: Innerhythmic
- Producer: Ejigayehu Shibabaw

Bill Laswell chronology
Blixt (2011)	Means of Deliverance (2012)	Túwaqachi (The Fourth World) (2012)

Professional ratings
Review scores
Source	Rating
AllMusic	4/5 stars
Exclaim!	7/10
PopMatters	7/10

Means of Deliverance is the seventeenth solo album by the American composer Bill Laswell, released on October 16, 2012, by Innerhythmic.

== Track listing ==
All music is composed by Bill Laswell, except "Bagana/Sub Figura X" co-written with Ejigayehu "Gigi" Shibabaw.

No.	Title	Length
1.	"Against the Upper House"	4:37
2.	"A Dangerous Road"	4:32
3.	"Ouroboros"	4:19
4.	"Buhala"	3:15
5.	"Bagana/Sub Figura X"	4:20
6.	"In Falling Light"	5:37
7.	"Aeon"	5:13
8.	"Epiphaneia"	4:40
9.	"Lightning in the South"	4:16
10.	"Low Country"	4:13

== Personnel ==
Adapted from the Means of Deliverance liner notes.

Musicians

- Bill Laswell – acoustic bass guitar, sampler
- Ejigayehu "Gigi" Shibabaw – vocals (5), producer

Technical personnel

- James Dellatacoma – assistant engineer
- Michael Fossenkemper – mastering
- Robert Musso – engineering
- Yoko Yamabe – cover art, design

== Release history ==
Region	Date	Label	Format	Catalog
United States	2012	Innerhythmic	CD	INR 024
