= Mixed Race (album) =

Studio album by Tricky
- Released: 27 September 2010
- Studio: Paris; London
- Genre: Trip hop; electronica
- Length: 29:17
- Label: Domino
- Producer: Tricky

Tricky chronology
Knowle West Boy (2008)	Mixed Race (2010)	False Idols (2013)

Singles from Mixed Race
- 1. "Murder Weapon" Released: 30 August 2010

Mixed Race is the eighth studio album by British musician Tricky. It was released on 27 September 2010 through Domino Recording Company, marking his second and final album for the label. Recorded in Paris and London, it was produced by Tricky himself with additional production handled by Ross Orton, Jimmy Robertson and Demian Castellanos.

The lead single from the album, "Murder Weapon", peaked at number 76 in France. The album itself made it to number 33 in France, number 61 in Flanders, number 69 in Wallonia, number 99 in Switzerland, number 12 on the UK Official Hip Hop and R&B Albums Chart, and number 11 on both the UK Official Independent Albums Chart and US Billboard Top Dance Albums charts.

== Critical reception ==
Professional ratings
Aggregate scores
Source	Rating
AnyDecentMusic?	6.6/10
Metacritic	64/100
Review scores
Source	Rating
AllMusic	3.5/5 stars
Clash	7/10
Drowned in Sound	7/10
MSN Music	A−
musicOMH	4/5 stars
Pitchfork	5/10
PopMatters	5/10
The A.V. Club	C+
The Guardian	3/5 stars
Tiny Mix Tapes	3.5/5 marks

Mixed Race was met with generally favourable reviews from music critics. At Metacritic, which assigns a normalized rating out of 100 to reviews from mainstream publications, the album received an average score of 64 based on nineteen reviews. The aggregator AnyDecentMusic? has the critical consensus of the album at a 6.6 out of 10, based on twenty-two reviews.

Robert Christgau of MSN Music praised the album, declaring "the thematic attack here is pretty surgical, cutting most of the time to the gangsta life he's so glad he sidestepped as a youth. The individual pieces are well-defined by his muzzy standards". Luke Winkie of musicOMH stated: "yes its weighed down by some empty dancefloor tat, but it's probably the strongest record work Tricky has put out this decade; definitely much more of a comeback than Knowle West Boy was". AllMusic's Thom Jurek concluded: "ultimately, Mixed Race, with its simmering tension, is a worthy follow-up to Knowle West Boy, and a fine entry in Tricky's catalog overall". Kingsley Marshall of Clash noted: "perhaps surprisingly, Adrian Thaws' Tricky schtick has yet to get old, with the only missteps on this, his ninth, album arriving when he conforms to, rather than resists, convention. Where it's good however, it's superfly". Paul Clarke of Drowned in Sound wrote: "even if "Time To Dance" doesn't quite ignite the desire to boogie it--like the rest of Mixed Race--awakens something else you might not associate with Tricky: a burning interest to hear what he'll do next". Tiny Mix Tapes contributor described the album as "mild as it might be, Mixed Race is a solid effort from someone who insists on sticking around".

In mixed reviews, Paul MacInnes of The Guardian has found the album "doesn't always hang together, but it is the work of someone with a renewed creative appetite". Michaelangelo Matos of The A.V. Club wrote: "while there are moments when his old jaggedness cuts through--the scraping "Early Bird" brings Tom Waits to mind, while "Ghetto Stars" has an eerie keening quality suggestive of industrial screech--Mixed Race is long on half-digested detours". Jess Harvell of Pitchfork called it "mostly a failure, but with enough glimmers of a true comeback to tease fans into checking out the next one". Mike Schiller of PopMatters stated: "despite unwittingly creating an album whose skin-deep sheen happens to be a metaphor for his career-long relationship with his audience, Tricky is offering us little more than an appetizer".

== Track listing ==
No.	Title	Writer(s)	Length
1.	"Every Day"	Adrian Nicholas Matthews Thaws; David Essex	2:25
2.	"UK Jamaican"	A. Thaws; Thomas Bangalter; Guy-Manuel de Homem-Christo; Russell Hergert; Theresa Williams	2:43
3.	"Early Bird"	A. Thaws	3:29
4.	"Ghetto Stars"	A. Thaws; Francesca Cherry Belmont	3:27
5.	"Hakim"	A. Thaws; Hakim Hamadouche	2:44
6.	"Come to Me"	A. Thaws; Belmont	3:55
7.	"Murder Weapon"	Noel Anthony Phillips	2:58
8.	"Time to Dance"	A. Thaws	2:24
9.	"Really Real"	A. Thaws; Bobby Gillespie	2:47
10.	"Bristol to London"	A. Thaws; Marlon Thaws; Ochoa Blackman	2:25
Total length:			29:17

Bonus track
No.	Title	Writer(s)	Length
11.	"Friend Went to Jail"	A. Thaws	2:13

== Personnel ==
- Adrian "Tricky" Thaws – producer
- Ross Orton – additional producer, mixing (tracks: 1–3, 5–7, 9, 10)
- Jimmy Robertson – additional producer, mixing (tracks: 4, 8)
- Demian Castellanos – additional producer, mixing (tracks: 4, 8)
- Al Riley – programming, recording, engineering
- Dan Hulme – programming, recording, engineering
- Matthew Cooper – design
- Jack Dante – front cover
- David Stanford – back cover

== Charts ==
Chart (2010)	Peak position
Belgian Albums (Ultratop Flanders)	61
Belgian Albums (Ultratop Wallonia)	69
French Albums (SNEP)	33
Swiss Albums (Schweizer Hitparade)	99
UK R&B Albums (OCC)	12
UK Independent Albums (OCC)	11
US Top Dance Albums (Billboard)	11
