= Blixt =

BLIXT

Studio album by Raoul Björkenheim, Bill Laswell and Morgan Ågren
- Released: October 11, 2011
- Recorded: September 20–21, 2010 at Orange Music, West Orange, NJ
- Genre: Jazz fusion, progressive rock
- Length: 47:58
- Label: Cuneiform

Bill Laswell chronology
Near Nadir (2011)	BLIXT (2011)	Means of Deliverance (2012)

BLIXT is a collaborative album by Morgan Ågren, Raoul Björkenheim and Bill Laswell. It was released on October 11, 2011 by Cuneiform Records.

== Track listing ==
All music is composed by Morgan Ågren, Raoul Björkenheim and Bill Laswell.

No.	Title	Length
1.	"Black Whole"	3:44
2.	"Moon Tune"	2:10
3.	"Tools"	5:22
4.	"Cinque Roulettes"	3:52
5.	"Shifting Sands Closing Hour"	2:44
6.	"Ghost Strokes"	8:25
7.	"Invisible One"	11:16
8.	"Drill Beats"	2:45
9.	"Storm"	3:37
10.	"4-4-4-4-2-2-2-5-2"	4:03

== Personnel ==
Adapted from the BLIXT liner notes.

Musicians

- Morgan Ågren – drums
- Raoul Björkenheim – guitar, design
- Bill Laswell – bass guitar

Technical personnel

- Stefan Bremer – cover art
- James Dellatacoma – assistant engineering
- Michael Fossenkemper – mastering
- Robert Musso – recording, mixing

== Release history ==
Region	Date	Label	Format	Catalog
United States	2011	Cuneiform	CD	rune 335
