= Near Nadir =

Studio album by Ikue Mori/Mark Nauseef/Evan Parker/Bill Laswell
- Released: 24 October 2011
- Recorded: August 2010, St Peter's Church, Whitstable, England; additional recording May 2010, EastSide Sound, NY; additional recording and mixing February 2011, Orange Music, West Orange, NJ
- Length: 45:19
- Label: Tzadik
- Producer: John Zorn (executive)

Bill Laswell chronology
Aspiration (2011)	Near Nadir (2011)	BLIXT (2011)

Near Nadir is a studio album by four musicians Ikue Mori, Mark Nauseef, Evan Parker and Bill Laswell. The album was released in 2011 for Zorn's Tzadik Records.

== Track listing ==
All songs by Ikue Mori, Mark Nauseef, Evan Parker and Bill Laswell.

1. "Majuu" – 3:33
2. "Valhalla" – 4:22
3. "In Gold Mesh" – 4:00
4. "Orbs" – 2:13
5. "Nooks" – 3:06
6. "Funnel Drone" – 2:23
7. "Yuga Warp" – 6:41
8. "Near Nadir" – 5:34
9. "Ternary Rite +" – 4:33
10. "Flo Vi Ru Dub" – 8:54

== Personnel ==
- Bill Laswell − basses
- Ikue Mori − electronics
- Evan Parker − soprano saxophone
- Mark Nauseef − bent metal, meditation bells, Chinese drums, woodblocks, tom-tom
