= Nirpal Singh Dhaliwal =

British writer and journalist

Nirpal Singh Dhaliwal (born 1974) is a British writer and journalist, mostly writing for The Telegraph and The Sun.

== Early life ==
Dhaliwal was born in Greenford, London and his parents were first-generation Punjabi immigrants. Dhaliwal was born a Sikh. He was state-school educated before going on to the University of Nottingham to read English and American literature.

== Career ==
Dhaliwal works as a freelance journalist, based in London, having resided for a while in New Delhi. He writes for The Times, The Guardian, Daily Mail, and the Evening Standard and extensively for the Indian and international press.

Dhaliwal's first novel Tourism was published in 2006 and received mixed reviews. Described as 'brilliant' in The Daily Telegraph, Julie Burchill thought it was 'touched with genius'.

== Personal life ==
In 2000, while working as a radio journalist for the BBC, Dhaliwal was sent to interview Liz Jones, then editor of Marie Claire. They married in 2002 and divorced in 2007. He wrote about the relationship in The Telegraph in July 2021: "Our marriage was doomed from our wedding day: an occasion I felt swindled into, having never proposed. She arranged it without my knowledge." In her Daily Mail column, Jones admitted to stealing his sperm by retrieving the contents of a used condom in an attempt to become pregnant.
