= False Idols =

Studio album by Tricky
- Released: 23 May 2013
- Genre: Trip hop
- Length: 45:07
- Label: False Idols
- Producers: The Antlers; Fifi Rong; Tricky

Tricky chronology
Mixed Race (2010)	False Idols (2013)	Adrian Thaws (2014)

False Idols is the ninth studio album by English trip hop musician Tricky, released on 23 May 2013. It is Tricky's first release on his label False Idols, an imprint of !K7.

The album features guest vocals by Francesca Belmonte, Fifi Rong, Nneka and Peter Silberman of The Antlers. The song "Nothing's Changed", which features Francesca Belmonte, was released on 27 February 2013. A music video for "Does It" premiered on 27 March 2013.

Tricky compared False Idols to his debut album, Maxinquaye, concluding that "False Idols is a better album." He also stated that "False Idols was about him finding himself again."

In support of the album, Tricky was to embark on a ten-date US tour, which would have kicked off in Columbus, Ohio on 8 June 2013. However, he was forced to postpone the tour until October due to unforeseen US visa issues. In 2014 it was awarded a double silver certification from the Independent Music Companies Association, which indicated sales of at least 40,000 copies throughout Europe.

Professional ratings
Aggregate scores
Source	Rating
Metacritic	72/100
Review scores
Source	Rating
AllMusic	3.5/5 stars
Clash	8/10
The Independent	4/5 stars
Mojo	4/5 stars
musicOMH	4/5 stars
Pitchfork	6.7/10
PopMatters	8/10
Q	3/5 stars
Sputnikmusic	4/5 stars
Uncut	3.5/5 stars

== Track listing ==
No.	Title	Writer(s)	Length
1.	"Somebody's Sins"	Patti Smith	2:40
2.	"Nothing Matters"	Adrian Nicholas Matthews Thaws; Nneka Lucia Egbuna	3:23
3.	"Valentine"	Thaws; Richard Rodgers; Lorenz Hart	3:16
4.	"Bonnie & Clyde"	Thaws	3:05
5.	"Parenthesis"	Thaws; The Antlers	2:57
6.	"Nothing's Changed"	Thaws	3:19
7.	"If Only I Knew"	Thaws; Fifi Rong	3:14
8.	"Is That Your Life"	Thaws; Francesca Belmonte	2:45
9.	"Tribal Drums"	Thaws; Belmonte	3:35
10.	"We Don't Die"	Thaws	3:11
11.	"Chinese Interlude"	Rong	2:14
12.	"Does It"	Thaws; Sharon Shy; Henry Frost	2:58
13.	"I'm Ready"	Thaws; Belmonte	2:36
14.	"Hey Love"	Thaws; David Sylvian	3:08
15.	"Passion of the Christ"	Thaws	2:46

Deluxe edition bonus track
No.	Title	Length
16.	"Does It" (Remix by Tricky)	2:42

iTunes Store bonus track
No.	Title	Length
16.	"We Don't Die" (Remix by Tricky)	3:22

Sample credits

- "Valentine" contains excerpts from "My Funny Valentine" as performed by Chet Baker.
- "Does It" features a sample from "Love Is a Chainstore" by The Ropes.
- "Hey Love" contains elements from "Ghosts" by Japan.

== Personnel ==
Credits for False Idols adapted from liner notes.

- Tricky – production (all tracks); vocals (3, 4, 6, 8, 12–15); additional vocals (5); photography
- The Antlers – guitar, lead vocals, production (5)
- Chet Baker – vocals (3)
- Francesca Belmont – vocals (1, 3, 4, 6, 8–10, 12, 13)
- Pepe Belmonte – guitar (4, 10)
- Ian Caple – mixing
- Tristan Cassell – vocals (9)
- John Davis – mastering
- Lee Jaffe – harmonica (2)
- François Kerjan – engineering
- Nneka – vocals (2)
- Anna Aiko Roche – artwork
- Fifi Rong – vocals (7, 11); production (11)

== Charts ==
Chart performance for False Idols
Chart (2013)	Peak position
Austrian Albums (Ö3 Austria)	34
Belgian Albums (Ultratop Flanders)	17
Belgian Albums (Ultratop Wallonia)	43
French Albums (SNEP)	93
German Albums (Offizielle Top 100)	83
Italian Albums (FIMI)	72
Swiss Albums (Schweizer Hitparade)	30
UK Albums (Official Charts)	66
UK Independent Albums (Official Charts)	15
US Billboard 200	149
US Independent Albums (Billboard)	24
US Top Dance Albums (Billboard)	5

== Release history ==
Region	Date	Label
Netherlands	23 May 2013	False Idols
Australia	24 May 2013	False Idols
Germany	24 May 2013	False Idols
Ireland	24 May 2013	False Idols
France	27 May 2013	False Idols
United Kingdom	27 May 2013	False Idols
Italy	28 May 2013	False Idols
United States	28 May 2013	False Idols
