= Ununiform =

Studio album by Tricky
- Released: 22 September 2017
- Recorded: Berlin, Germany
- Length: 41:23
- Label: False Idols

Tricky chronology
Skilled Mechanics (2016)	Ununiform (2017)	Fall to Pieces (2020)

Ununiform (Note: Pitchfork stylises the title with a lowercase "u", as does Tricky's official Facebook page.) is the thirteenth studio album by English trip hop artist Tricky. It was released by False Idols on 22 September 2017. Three singles were taken from this album, 'The Only Way', 'When We Die' and 'Running Wild', all of them released before the album. And alternative version of 'The Only Way' was uploaded on Tricky personal SoundCloud account a few weeks after the original, and later released as a single in 2018, this version was also included in the physical releases of the album, but unlisted in the back cover. The album features a variety of guest vocalists, including Russian rappers, American vocalists, his usual collaborator Francesca Belmonte, and Tricky's frequent-collaborator and former girlfriend Martina Topley-Bird.

== Recording ==
Tricky conceived the album while in Moscow, Russia; it consequently features vocal contributions from Russian rapper Smoky Mo. The album was recorded in Berlin, Germany. The album features a mixture of trip hop-inspired tracks as well as guitar-based tracks, including a cover version of "Doll Parts" by Hole, featuring vocals from Los Angeles-based artist Avalon Lurks. American hip hop artist Jay-Z co-engineered the album.

== Critical reception ==
Professional ratings
Aggregate scores
Source	Rating
AnyDecentMusic?	6.3/10
Metacritic	71/100
Review scores
Source	Rating
AllMusic	3.5/5 stars
Exclaim!	5/10
The Irish Times	3/5 stars
Mojo	3/5 stars
The Observer	4/5 stars
Pitchfork	5.1/10
PopMatters	6/10
Q	4/5 stars
Rolling Stone Russia	2/5 stars
Uncut	4/5 stars

Ununiform received generally positive reviews from critics. At Metacritic, which assigns a normalised rating out of 100 to reviews from mainstream publications, the album received an average score of 71, based on 12 reviews. Kitty Empire of The Observer gave the album 4 out of 5 stars, stating that "Tricky creates a claustrophobic world full of stark bass lines, pop digressions and slinky Bristol moments; his duet with Francesca Belmonte, New Stole, is particularly moreish." Ben Cardew of Pitchfork gave the album 5.1 out of 10 stars, summarising: "ununiform may come nowhere near to the jaw-dropping impact of those early Tricky albums. But buried deep in his 13th studio release, Tricky may just have sown the seeds of a new musical contentment." The album was compared to Serge Gainsbourg's Histoire de Melody Nelson (1971) and The xx's Coexist (2012).

== Track listing ==
All tracks are written by Tricky, unless noted.

No.	Title	Writer(s)	Length
1.	"Obia Intro"		1:56
2.	"Same as It Ever Was" (featuring Scriptonite)		3:46
3.	"New Stole" (featuring Francesca Belmonte)		3:06
4.	"Wait for Signal" (featuring Asia Argento)		3:08
5.	"It's Your Day" (featuring Scriptonite)		2:03
6.	"Blood of My Blood" (featuring Scriptonite)		3:13
7.	"Dark Days" (featuring Mina Rose)		2:49
8.	"The Only Way"		4:51
9.	"Armor" (featuring Terra Lopez)		2:25
10.	"Doll" (featuring Avalon Lurks^{[1]})	Courtney Love	3:06
11.	"Bang Boogie" (featuring Smoky Mo and Scriptonite)		1:18
12.	"Running Wild" (featuring Mina Rose^{[2]})		3:37
13.	"When We Die" (featuring Martina Topley-Bird)		3:43
Total length:			41:23

Physical edition bonus track
No.	Title	Length
14.	"The Only Way" (Stripped Down Tricky Mix)	4:07

Note

- 1 "Doll" is a cover of "Doll Parts" by Hole.
- 2 "Running Wild" was also co-written by Mina Rose.
- 3 "New Stole" is a reworked version of Francesca Belmonte song Stole from her debut album Anima.

== Personnel ==
Musicians

- Tricky – vocals, production
- Scriptonite – vocals (tracks 2, 5, 6, 11)
- Avalon Lurks – vocals, guitar (track 10)
- Francesca Belmonte – vocals (track 3)
- Asia Argento – vocals (track 4)
- Mina Rose – vocals, guitar (tracks 7, 12)
- Smoky Mo – vocals (track 11)
- Martina Topley-Bird – vocals (track 13)
- Terra Lopez – vocals (track 9)
- Wim Janssens – guitar, synthesizer
- Leon Schurz – bass
- Muyi Liu – keyboards, piano
- Tom Schneider – synthesizer

Technical

- Jay-Z – engineering
- BeatsBySmo – engineering, production
- Levan Avazashvilli – engineering, production
- Vasiliy Mikhaylovich Vakulenko – production

== Charts ==
Chart (2017)	Peak position
Belgian Albums (Ultratop Flanders)	114
Belgian Albums (Ultratop Wallonia)	52
French Albums (SNEP)	74
Swiss Albums (Schweizer Hitparade)	47
