= Tattoo (Siouxsie and the Banshees song) =

- UK single B-side label

Song by Siouxsie and the Banshees

from the album Downside Up (compilation)
- Released: 23 September 1983
- Recorded: 1983
- Genre: Post-punk, proto-trip-hop
- Label: Polydor
- Songwriters: Siouxsie Sioux, Steven Severin, Budgie
- Producers: Siouxsie and the Banshees, Mike Hedges

"Tattoo" is a song written and recorded by Siouxsie and the Banshees and co-produced by Mike Hedges in 1983. For music historians, its claustrophobic and moist production predated the trip-hop genre that later appeared in the mid-1990s. The Quietus dubbed "Tattoo" "proto-trip-hop". In 1996, the song was covered by Tricky.

== Music and recording ==
"Tattoo" was composed and performed as a three-piece by singer Siouxsie Sioux, bassist Steven Severin and drummer Budgie. It was the first B-side they recorded as a trio. During this era, the band experimented other ways of recording and orchestration when they were in the studio to record extra tracks for their singles.

Severin wanted to put down a bass harmonic idea he had been playing around with at sound checks. "Budgie and I jammed it out and I added a second bass part". Budgie then added piano that co-producer Mike Hedges "treated".

For "Tattoo", Hedges made them use the mixing desk as an instrument. Budgie said that Hedges was "an integral part of the creative process". Budgie specifically created "a drum kit sound from various elements". "Tattoo [...] was just built up from timbales, a simple pattern of timbales and snare drum, built up in rounds."

Whilst Hedges was starting the mix of "Dear Prudence" at Eden studios in London, they watched the movie Tattoo (1981) starring Bruce Dern. Siouxsie then wrote out the lyrics and performed the vocal, "all done in one day".

== Release ==
The song was first released as the B-side of the "Dear Prudence" single in 1983. Siouxsie retrospectively said that "it was a great riposte, a great flip to the kind of sunshine and lightness" of the A-side.

"Tattoo" was remastered to be included on two compilation CDs: Downside Up (2004)) and Spellbound : The Collection (2015).

== Legacy ==
"Tattoo" is considered to be a proto-trip-hop track which helped Tricky to shape his style, with its "claustrophobic mood and insistent rhythm". The song is often cited as inspirational in the development of the trip-hop genre. "Tattoo" was covered by Tricky in 1996 as the opening number of his second album, Nearly God. Tricky also sampled the original orchestration. "Tattoo" was also covered by Jay Jay Johanson in 2022.

NME called the song "spellbinding" in 2009 while retrospectively reviewing Downside Up.

In 2024, "Tattoo" was included on the vinyl compilation titled FIP Trip Hop – made by FIP and Radio France – about the trip-hop genre, its roots and its history.

== Aftermath ==
Siouxsie declared in 1998 that it was her "all-time favourite Banshees track", and she performed it live that year with the Creatures. Severin shared a similar view in 2004, saying: "Probably my favourite B-side of all".

== Personnel ==
- Siouxsie Sioux – voice
- Steven Severin – harmonic and drone basses
- Budgie – timbales, snares, piano and vocal percussion
