= Adrian Thaws (album) =

Studio album by Tricky
- Released: 8 September 2014
- Recorded: Tricky's home studio, London
- Genres: Trip hop; hip house; dub
- Length: 38:15
- Label: False Idols
- Producer: Tricky

Tricky chronology
False Idols (2013)	Adrian Thaws (2014)	Skilled Mechanics (2016)

Professional ratings
Aggregate scores
Source	Rating
Metacritic	67/100
Review scores
Source	Rating
AllMusic	4/5 stars
The Arts Desk	4/5 stars
The Guardian	4/5 stars
The Line of Best Fit	8/10
NME	6/10
Pitchfork	4.8/10
PopMatters	7/10
Record Collector	4/5 stars
Uncut	3.5/5 stars
Under the Radar	6/10

Adrian Thaws is the tenth studio album by English trip hop musician Adrian Thaws, known professionally as Tricky. Recorded at Tricky's home studio in London, the album was released on 8 September 2014, through Tricky's own record label False Idols.

The album features guest contributions from various artists, including Nneka, Mykki Blanco, Oh Land, NoLay and Blue Daisy. On 30 June 2014 Tricky shared the track "Nicotine Love", which features vocal contributions from Irish singer Francesca Belmonte. Cover Art by Zlatimir Arakliev

== Background ==
On the album's title, which is Tricky's birth name, Tricky stated: "Calling it 'Adrian Thaws' is saying 'You don't really know me.' So many times, people have tried to put a finger on me and every album I go to a different place." On the album's sound, Tricky also stated:

I suppose this is my club/hip hop album. I've only heard my music a few times in a club but I grew up in clubs from when I was 14: blues parties, hip hop clubs, a few raves. I'm not known for doing club music but this album has some club tracks on it – well, what I would consider club music.

Michelle Geslani of Consequence of Sound reported that the album features elements from "hip hop, house, jazz, blues, and reggae," while describing the track "Nicotine Love" as "a slinky, body-moving number that seems well-suited for U.K. club-hopping."

== Track listing ==
No.	Title	Writer(s)	Original artist	Length
1.	"Sun Down" (featuring Tirzah)	Tricky; Tirzah		3:42
2.	"Lonnie Listen" (featuring Mykki Blanco and Francesca Belmonte)	Tricky; Mykki Blanco; Bugle		3:16
3.	"Something in the Way" (featuring Francesca Belmonte)	Tricky; Francesca Belmonte		3:25
4.	"Keep Me in Your Shake" (featuring Nneka) (sampled "Heaven Beside You" by Alice in Chains)	Tricky; Nneka		3:27
5.	"The Unloved (Skit)"	Alan Johnson		1:10
6.	"Nicotine Love" (featuring Francesca Belmonte)	Tricky; Francesca Belmonte		3:07
7.	"Gangster Chronicle" (featuring Bella Gotti) (sampled "Planetary Citizen" by Mahavishnu Orchestra)	Rodney Panton; Jeff Tetteh		3:00
8.	"I Had a Dream" (featuring Francesca Belmonte)	Tricky; Francesca Belmonte		2:38
9.	"My Palestine Girl" (featuring Blue Daisy)	Tricky; Kwesi Darko		3:33
10.	"Why Don't You" (featuring Bella Gotti)	Tricky; No Lay		3:33
11.	"Silly Games" (featuring Tirzah)	Dennis Bovell	Janet Kay	3:37
12.	"Right Here" (featuring Oh Land)	Tricky; Nanna Øland Fabricius		2:59
13.	"Silver Tongue - When You Go"	Silver Tongue		0:48
