= Knowle West Boy =

Studio album by Tricky
- Released: 7 July 2008
- Recorded: 2007
- Length: 45:53
- Label: Domino
- Producer: Tricky; Bernard Butler

Tricky chronology
Vulnerable (2003)	Knowle West Boy (2008)	Mixed Race (2010)

Professional ratings
Aggregate scores
Source	Rating
Metacritic	70/100
Review scores
Source	Rating
AllMusic	4/5 stars
Blender	3.5/5 stars
Entertainment Weekly	B
Drowned in Sound	6/10
The Guardian	4/5 stars
NME	7/10
Pitchfork	5.8/10
PopMatters	7/10
Rolling Stone	3.5/5 stars
Uncut	4/5 stars

Knowle West Boy is the seventh studio album by musician and producer Tricky, released by Domino Records on 7 July 2008 in Europe, and 9 September 2008 in North America.

A remixed version of the album called Tricky Meets South Rakkas Crew was released in 2009 and was mixed by Florida-based producers South Rakkas Crew.

== Details ==
The first single, "Council Estate", samples "Roads" by Portishead from the 1994 album Dummy. It was the first single that Tricky had ever done with just himself on vocals. He commented: "I couldn't whisper that song. I had to come out of myself and do a loud, screaming vocal. I wanted to be a proper frontman on that one."

"Cross to Bear" features guest vocals from Hafdís Huld.

"Veronika" is a cover of the song "Livido Amniotico" by Subsonica (featuring Veronika Coassolo), which was first published as one of three previously unreleased studio tracks in their 2003 live album Controllo del livello di rombo.

== Track listing ==
All music is composed by Tricky and Bernard Butler except where noted.

Knowle West Boy track listing
No.	Title	Writer(s)	Length
1.	"Puppy Toy" (featuring Alex Mills)		3:34
2.	"Bacative"		3:51
3.	"Joseph" (featuring Joseph Franklin Hunt)		2:29
4.	"Veronika"	Tricky; Veronika Coassolo	3:00
5.	"C'mon Baby"		3:04
6.	"Council Estate"		2:39
7.	"Past Mistake"		5:07
8.	"Coalition"		3:59
9.	"Cross to Bear"		3:47
10.	"Slow"	Kylie Minogue; Mr. Dan; Emilíana Torrini	3:22
11.	"Baligaga"		3:42
12.	"Far Away"	Tricky; Veronika Coassolo	3:38
13.	"School Gates"		3:47

== Charts ==
Chart performance for Knowle West Boy
Chart (2008)	Peak position
Australian Albums (ARIA)	93
Austrian Albums (Ö3 Austria)	35
Belgian Albums (Ultratop Flanders)	35
Belgian Albums (Ultratop Wallonia)	89
Dutch Albums (Album Top 100)	86
French Albums (SNEP)	31
German Albums (Offizielle Top 100)	95
Italian Albums (FIMI)	53
Portuguese Albums (AFP)	48
Swiss Albums (Schweizer Hitparade)	25
UK Albums (OCC)	63
US Billboard 200	147
