= Pre-Millennium Tension =

Studio album by Tricky
- Released: 11 November 1996
- Recorded: 1996
- Studios: Grove Studios, Ocho Rios, Jamaica and Platinium Island Studios in New York City
- Genres: Trip hop; British hip hop; experimental; electronic; dub; post-rock; sampledelia
- Length: 47:21
- Labels: Island; PolyGram
- Producer: Tricky

Tricky chronology
Nearly God (1996)	Pre-Millennium Tension (1996)	Angels with Dirty Faces (1998)

Singles from Pre-Millennium Tension
- 1. "Christiansands" Released: 28 October 1996; 2. "Tricky Kid" Released: 23 December 1996; 3. "Makes Me Wanna Die" Released: 1997

Pre-Millennium Tension is the second album from English rapper and producer Tricky, released on 11 November 1996 on Island. The album was well received by critics, being named the ninth best record of the year in the 1996 Pazz & Jop poll. Tricky regarded the album as an attempt to depart from the traits of the genre trip hop, with which critics had previously described Maxinquaye.

== Background ==
In an October 1996 interview for Ray Gun, Tricky said he wanted to make Pre-Millennium Tension an "out-an'-out punk record" to get away from the trip hop label with which his previous work had been categorized by critics. He said, "I thought it was going be heavier... What I wanted to do was a total fast album. Some of the tracks are fast and hard, but they didn't come out like that." The album was mainly recorded in Jamaica, and other parts were recorded at Platinum Islands Studio, New York. It was recorded, mixed and programmed by Ian Caple. Recorded in Grove Studios, Ocho Rios, Jamaica and mixed at El Cortijo Studio in Spain.

According to PopMatters writer Wayne Franklin, Pre-Millennium Tension "revealed a new, more sinister sound, most likely attained due to his move to New York City and his work with underground rappers ... containing the singles "Christiansands" (the biggest hit of his career), "Tricky Kid", and "Makes Me Wanna Die" (which contains a sample of Eric B. & Rakim's "To the Listeners")".

In an anecdote between journalist Liz Jones and Prince published in her biography of Prince, Slave to the Rhythm, Jones told Prince he should listen to Tricky, as she saw parallels between them; Prince asked her the name of Tricky's latest album, to which she said Pre-Millennium Tension, and Prince spontaneously answered, "well, isn't that just a longer way of saying 1999?"

== Critical reception ==
Professional ratings
Review scores
Source	Rating
AllMusic	4/5 stars
Chicago Tribune	4/4 stars
Entertainment Weekly	B−
The Guardian	4/5 stars
NME	6/10
Pitchfork	8.0/10
Q	4/5 stars
Rolling Stone	4/5 stars
Spin	9/10
The Village Voice	A−

Pre-Millennium Tension received positive reviews from critics, who found the record's music ambitious, eclectic, and threatening. USA Today reviewer Elysa Gardner called it a dazzling trip hop album and Tricky "prolific, innovative and fearlessly eccentric", comparing him to American musician Prince. In the Chicago Tribune, Greg Kot said Tricky had transcended the boundaries of trip hop by drawing upon and manipulating a number of styles, including ambient, drum and bass, hip hop, and dancehall, in his evocative production. "Few records have more artfully blurred the boundaries between sensuality and terror, fascination and fear, seduction and confusion", Kot wrote. David Bennun from The Guardian argued that Tricky had deconstructed hip hop clichés and "gangsta-isms" into bizarrely malcontent songs on what was an "astonishing record – not a great one, but a very good, very awkward and very strange one". Village Voice critic Robert Christgau found his use of hip hop soundscapes compelling on a record that "comprehends and inhabits the dystopia of everyday life more radically than Wu-Tang could conceive". He qualified his praise by adding that the success of Tricky's formula relied heavily on Topley-Bird. Simon Williams of NME was less impressed, writing that the album's last few songs "seemed to suffer from the very fury which makes the rest of the record work". He singled out "My Evil Is Strong" and "Piano" for overindulging in cynical attitudes and monotonous music. David Browne was more critical in Entertainment Weekly. He believed Tricky's incorporation of more soul and reggae elements than Maxinquaye, as well as his use of spasmodic beats and "revue-style singers", had weakened his "trademark trip-hop" style and resulted in a more theatrical, "pretentious" record.

At the end of 1996, Pre-Millennium Tension was voted the ninth best album of the year in the Pazz & Jop, an annual poll of American critics nationwide. It was later included in Q magazine's "50 Heaviest Albums of All Time".

In 2017, Nate Patrin of Pitchfork noted the album's longevity, saying that the album's name "is the only obvious thing that tells you it’s two decades old rather than two weeks."

== Track listing ==
Pre-Millennium Tension track listing
No.	Title	Length
1.	"Vent"	3:04
2.	"Christiansands"	3:52
3.	"Tricky Kid"	4:11
4.	"Bad Dream"	4:12
5.	"Makes Me Wanna Die"	4:02
6.	"Ghetto Youth"	5:37
7.	"Sex Drive"	3:51
8.	"Bad Things"	5:12
9.	"Lyrics of Fury (Eric B. & Rakim cover)"	3:21
10.	"My Evil Is Strong"	3:59
11.	"Piano"	4:14

== Charts ==
Chart performance for Pre-Millennium Tension
Chart (1996)	Peak position
Australian Albums (ARIA)	63
Belgian Albums (Ultratop Wallonia)	42
Dutch Albums (Album Top 100)	64
Finnish Albums (Suomen virallinen lista)	30
German Albums (Offizielle Top 100)	69
New Zealand Albums (RMNZ)	26
Swedish Albums (Sverigetopplistan)	31
UK Albums (Official Charts)	30
US Billboard 200	140
