= Angels with Dirty Faces (Tricky album) =

Studio album by Tricky
- Released: 25 May 1998
- Studio: Various: Compass Point Studios, (Nassau); Kingsway Studios, (New Orleans); Christchurch Studios, (Bristol); Bearsville Studios, (Bearsville); Clinton Recording Studios, Durban Poison Studios, Room With A View, The Hit Factory, (New York)
- Genre: Rock; trip hop
- Length: 50:43
- Label: Island
- Producer: Tricky

Tricky chronology
Pre-Millennium Tension (1996)	Angels with Dirty Faces (1998)	Juxtapose (1999)

Angels with Dirty Faces is the third album of English musician Tricky, released in 1998. The title is taken from the film of the same name.

== Music and lyrics ==
"Broken Homes" features English singer-songwriter PJ Harvey. "Carriage for Two" features the guitar playing of Anthrax guitarist Scott Ian. Various tracks features the guitars of Marc Ribot. "The Moment I Feared" is a cover of the song from the debut album The Great Adventures of Slick Rick by Slick Rick.

== Critical reception ==
Professional ratings
Review scores
Source	Rating
AllMusic	2.5/5 stars
Christgau's Consumer Guide	A−
Entertainment Weekly	A
The Guardian	3/5 stars
Los Angeles Times	3.5/4 stars
NME	5/10
Pitchfork	8.2/10
Rolling Stone	3.5/5 stars
Select	4/5
Spin	8/10

In a contemporary review for Entertainment Weekly, David Browne viewed Angels with Dirty Faces as Tricky's best album since his 1995 debut Maxinquaye. He described it as an "alluring sonic blur" that preserved his previous music's mesmeric sounds yet felt "more adventurous, rhythmically and musically, than its predecessors". Simon Price hailed it as Tricky's most cogent work since his debut album: "Simultaneously challenging and gorgeously formed, it's a brilliant mix of defiance and achievement." Village Voice critic Robert Christgau said it was a rock album with a live band on every song, no samples, and "grimy" productions that complemented Tricky's anti-social themes, making for a difficult but interesting listen:

"I don't like this century," Tricky mutters in the course of "Record Companies," and that sums up his worldview as eloquently as words ever will. It's the sounds that signify, and postindustrially premillennial though Tricky's may be, they're also original, strong, and to the point. He distinguishes himself from the run of noise sculptors just by remaining conducive to recognizable life. He's a hater not a fighter, and the devil is in his details. So give that man a set of horns--he's earned them.

In a retrospective review for AllMusic, Stephen Thomas Erlewine was less enthusiastic about the record. He wrote that while Tricky had expanded his signature dub-inspired trip hop sound with rhythmic elements from hardcore hip hop and jungle music, Angels with Dirty Faces was "slightly different but essentially the same" as his previous album Pre-Millennium Tension.

As of September 2003, it has sold 113,000 copies in United States according to Nielsen SoundScan.

== Track listing ==
No.	Title	Length
1.	"Money Greedy"	5:30
2.	"Mellow"	3:33
3.	"Singing the Blues"	3:27
4.	"Broken Homes" (with PJ Harvey)	3:34
5.	"6 Minutes"	4:46
6.	"Analyze Me"	4:00
7.	"The Moment I Feared"	4:03
8.	"Talk to Me (Angels with Dirty Faces)"	4:28
9.	"Carriage for Two"	4:44
10.	"Demise"	3:48
11.	"Tear out My Eyes"	4:26
12.	"Record Companies"	4:22
13.	"Peyote Sings" (bonus track)	5:01
14.	"Taxi" (bonus track)	3:55

== Personnel ==
- Design, Photography By [manipulation] – AP;D
- Drums – Perry Melius (tracks: 1, 5, 6, 9 to 11)
- Engineer – Ethan Allen (tracks: 2, 6, 8, 10 to 12)
- Engineer [Additional Mixing] – Jack Hersca (tracks: 2 to 4, 6 to 12)
- Assistant engineer – Chipman Verspyck (tracks: 1, 3, 5, 9 to 12), Mark Fraunfelder (tracks: 1, 3, 5, 8 to 10), Serge Tsai
- Guitar – Scott Ian (tracks: 1, 5, 9 to 12)
- Keyboards, Producer, Photography By [Palaroid], Illustration – Tricky
- Mastered By – Howie Weinberg
- Mixed By – Susan Rogers (tracks: 2, 3, 5 to 12), Tricky (tracks: 2 to 12)
- Cover Photography – Barron Claiborne
- Vocals – Martina Topley-Bird (tracks: 3, 5, 6, 8 to 10), Tricky (tracks: 1, 2, 4 to 12)
- Written-By – Tricky (tracks: 1, 2, 4 to 6, 8 to 12) Mary McReary (track 3) Hank Shocklee/ Ricky Walters/Eric Sadler (track 7)
- Pete Briquette - bass
- Gareth Bowen - keyboards
- Jack Hersca - bass, guitar
- Jane Scarpantoni - cello
- Gene Lake, Calvin Weston - drums
- Lorenza Ponce - violin
- Marc Ribot, Patrice Serapiglia - guitar
- Doug Wieselman - flute
- Greg Cohen - double bass

== Charts ==
Chart performance for Angels with Dirty Faces
Chart (1998)	Peak position
Australian Albums (ARIA)	35
Belgian Albums (Ultratop Flanders)	32
French Albums (SNEP)	14
German Albums (Offizielle Top 100)	48
New Zealand Albums (RMNZ)	20
Norwegian Albums (VG-lista)	38
Swedish Albums (Sverigetopplistan)	54
UK Albums (OCC)	23
US Billboard 200	84

== Certifications and sales ==
Certifications and sales for Angels with Dirty Faces
Region	Certification	Certified units/sales
United States	—	113,000
