= Ivy (Chinese singer) =

- 艾菲
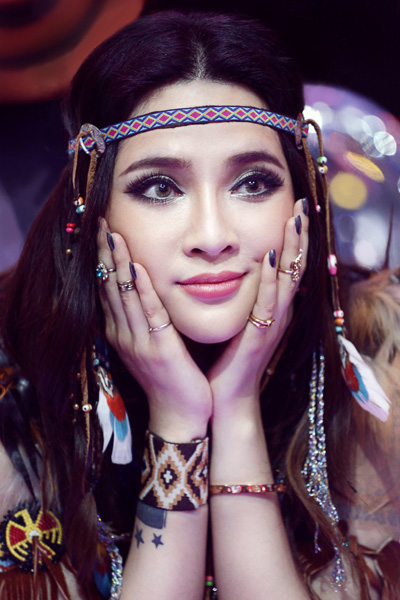
- Ivy in 2015
- Born: Deng Wanxing; January 30, 1987 (age 39); Nanning, Guangxi, China
- Education: Guangxi Arts Institute
- Occupations: Singer; dancer
- Years active: 2013–present
- Musical career
- Genres: Pop, Hip hop, electronic rock, Britpop
- Instrument: Vocals
- Labels: Shengqiang International; Yuehua Entertainment

Deng Wanxing (Chinese: 邓婉婞; pinyin: Dèng Wǎnxìng, born 30 January 1987), professionally known as Ivy (Chinese: 艾菲; pinyin: Ai Fei) or Ai Fei, is a Chinese singer and dancer. She was born and raised in the Guangxi city of Nanning and received national recognition after finishing third on the first season of Chinese Idol.

== Early life ==
Deng Wanxing was born to a working class single mother in Nanning, Guangxi and is from the Hui ethnic group. She graduated from the Guangxi Arts Institute after enrolling in 2003.

== Career ==
=== 2006–2012: Career beginnings ===
Ivy frequently performed in bars for work, citing this as useful experience for the development of her live skills. She frequently performed with Jike Junyi, who came third in season one of The Voice of China.

=== 2013: Chinese Idol and rise to fame ===
Ivy shot to fame after auditioning for Chinese Idol in 2012, auditioning with Beyoncé's "Single Ladies (Put a Ring on It)". Her performance of "Love On Top" was met with widespread acclaim in China, with her all-round abilities as a performer being praised. Despite being a favourite to win the competition, Ivy finished in third place. Following her elimination, she participated in the Chinese Idol Tour of China and signed to the Shengqiang International record label.

=== 2014–2016: Crazy In Love, Heroes of the Remix and Mask Singer ===
Releasing her first extended play Crazy In Love on April 2, 2014, Ivy experimented in several sounds on her début release, including electronic rock, hip hop and pop. To celebrate the release of her EP, she held a release party at the Space One nightclub in Beijing, which saw her give her a critically praised performance of the EP.

In 2015, English musician Tricky released an alternate version of her single "Shaliaba", entitled "Beijing to Berlin". It received acclaim from The Guardian and acted as the lead single to his album Skilled Mechanics.

In 2016, she appeared as a contestant on Heroes of Remix in a duo with Chinese singer Dany Lee. The duo reached the grand final however lost out on winning to Wowkie Zhang. She then went onto appear as a judge on Mask Singer from weeks one to four.

=== 2017-present: I. Feminism, collaborations and acting ===
Ivy's second extended play, I. Feminism was released with Yuehua Entertainment and saw her career brought to new highs as she reached number one on the Billboard China V Chart. Preceded by the single "Li Sao", I. Feminism was the only album by a Mainland China female artist to reach number one that year. It was also the tenth best selling album of 2017 in China, spending 24 weeks on the V Chart. "Li Sao" débuted and peaked at #8 on the YinYueTai V Chart, while "Bad Girls Need Love too" peaked at #9.

In 2018, Ivy featured on two tracks by Korean DJ TPA, "China Trap House" with Hong Kong rapper Al Rocco, and "Combo" with Rocco and Korean artist Seungri. She also co-starred in the Chinese drama My Idol as the character Kim. Ivy further released her new single "Barbies Know Know" with Dany Lee. This marked her third collaboration single with Dany, having previously worked with her on the I. Feminism extended play.

== Discography ==
=== Extended plays ===
Title	Details	Peak	Sales
Title	Details	CHN Billboard V Chart	Sales
Crazy In Love	Released: May 13, 2014; Label: Shengqiang International; Formats: CD, Digital Download; Track listing: 1. 菲愛不可 (Never Say Never); 2. 莎里阿巴 (Shaliaba); 3. Wake Up; 4. Angel; 5. 守護夢想 (Guardian of Dreams)	-	CHN: -
I. Feminism	Released: September 28, 2017; Label: YueHua Entertainment; Formats: CD, Digital Download; Track listing: 1. 離騷 (Li Sao); 2. Bad Girls Need Love Too (feat. Dany Lee and Blow); 3. 十面埋伏2 (Ambush On All Sides) [feat. Dany Lee]; 4. Get Out; 5. 幸福 還有多遠 (How Far Is Happiness)	1	CHN: -

=== Singles ===
Title	Year	Peak chart position	Album
Title	Year	CHN Billboard V Chart	Album
"Wake Up"	2014	—	Crazy In Love
"Shaliaba"	2015	—	Crazy In Love
"Beijing to Berlin" (Tricky featuring Ivy)	2015	—	Skilled Mechanics
"Li Sao"	2017	8	I. Feminism
"Bad Girls Need Love Too" (featuring Dany Lee)	2017	9	I. Feminism
"Ambush On All Sides" (featuring Dany Lee)	2017	—	I. Feminism
"How Far Is Happiness"	2017	—	I. Feminism
"Barbies Know Know" (with Dany Lee)	2018	—	Non-album single
