= Nearly God =

Studio album by Nearly God
- Released: February 1996
- Genres: Trip hop; experimental; lo-fi
- Length: 60:48
- Label: Island
- Producer: Tricky

Tricky chronology
Maxinquaye (1995)	Nearly God (1996)	Pre-Millennium Tension (1996)

Nearly God is the unofficial second album by English rapper and producer Tricky. It was released in February 1996 under the pseudonym "Nearly God", which originated from an interview during which Tricky was asked "so how does it feel to be God... well, nearly God."

Described by Tricky as a compilation of exceptional yet unfinished demos, Nearly God was the result of a clause in his recording contract with Island Records, which allowed him to release an album once a year under a name other than his own. According to Tricky, "I needed it to come out, but Island would never let me release two Tricky albums in the same year"; his official second album Pre-Millennium Tension was released in September 1996.

An austerely produced trip hop record, Nearly God was well received by critics and featured collaborations between Tricky and artists such as Alison Moyet, Björk, Neneh Cherry, Terry Hall, and Martina Topley-Bird, who had worked with him on his previous album Maxinquaye (1995).

== Recording ==
Nearly God was recorded in three weeks during the summer, in New York and London, and Tricky himself describes it as "a collection of brilliant, incomplete demos". The tracks were re-worked and mixed in London by Ian Caple and Tricky.

Originally, Nearly God also included a song with Blur frontman Damon Albarn, but it was removed at the last minute, with Tricky expressing displeasure at Albarn's working methods, saying: "He wants to work on something for like two months and then do the vocals again and again and again, and I don't work like that." The song was later recorded again with Madness lead singer Suggs, but this version ("I'll pass right through you") was not released either. Four of ten rumoured songs with Neneh Cherry were released on her singles "Woman", "Kootchi" and "Feel it" in 1996 and 1997. Tricky also recorded another song with Cath Coffey, a cover of the Grease song "Summer Nights" which was released in 1997 on her first album Mind the Gap (released only in Japan so far).

The final product contains collaborations with Terry Hall (singer of The Specials), Alison Moyet, Cath Coffey, Neneh Cherry, Björk and Martina Topley-Bird. The first track is a cover of "Tattoo", a b-side of popular post-punk band Siouxsie and the Banshees. Scott McKeating of Stylus Magazine describes Nearly God as a much darker-sounding album than Maxinquaye, calling it a "dark, zoned out, Class-A substance damaged lo-fi affair which still manages to force melody through dark mesh. Realistically though, this isn’t a dyspeptic, career destroying Metal Machine Music themed 'fuck you'. Because while the songs forms are barely scratched in, never mind being fleshed out; Tricky makes the sound of dark nights, of want and solitude just as engaging as anything on his debut."

== Critical reception ==
Professional ratings
Review scores
Source	Rating
AllMusic	4.5/5 stars
Alternative Press	5/5
Chicago Tribune	3.5/4 stars
Entertainment Weekly	A
The Guardian	5/5 stars
Los Angeles Times	3/4 stars
NME	7/10
Rolling Stone	4/5 stars
Select	4/5
Spin	8/10

Nearly God received positive reviews from critics. James Hunter of Rolling Stone found the music gripping, "recalling the early intimacy of Laurie Anderson, the raw aggression of Public Image Ltd. and the spaced oddities of Scott Walker". Spin magazine's Terri Sutton was impressed by Tricky's production and the record's "obsession with debilitating stasis", comparing it favourably to Sly & the Family Stone's 1971 album There's a Riot Goin' On: "Nearly God is most indebted to Riot for the idea that an attention to details, a precise awareness, can capture from entropy's numbing flow small gifts of nuance and emotional resonance." Roger Morton from NME was less enthusiastic: "The loopy loops and dysfunctional mantras of Tricky's smoked-out backing tracks are less structured and more spartan than on Maxinquaye. Sometimes it sound like he's just kicked the sequencer and walked out. The onus is heavily on the singers to carry the weight, and it doesn't always work." In Melody Maker, Taylor Parkes deemed it "a mess, albeit a hugely affecting one, a stop-gap, when three more months spent on arrangements and production would have fastered a masterpiece to surpass Maxinquaye".

At the end of 1996, Nearly God was voted the 19th best album of the year in the Pazz & Jop, an annual poll of American critics nationwide, published by The Village Voice. Robert Christgau, the poll's creator, later gave it a one-star honorable mention, indicating "a worthy effort consumers attuned to its overriding aesthetic or individual vision may well like". He cited "Together Now" and "Children's Story" as highlights and felt the record indulged in a sluggishness "true Tricky albums only play with".

As of September 2003, it has sold 54,000 copies in United States according to Nielsen SoundScan. In naming it trip hop's eighteenth greatest album, John Twells and Laurent Fintoni of FACT Magazine wrote: "What sounds like it could have been a self-indulgent victory lap for (back then) one of the UK’s most notorious stars is somehow a coherent, exemplary document of a peculiar time in British music."

The music video for Poems won a D&AD Pencil Award. Directed by Pinko for Stark2 Films with Nick Verden producing, the video was filmed on location at Paddington Basin London.

== Track listing ==
No.	Title	Writer(s)	Vocals	Length
1.	"Tattoo"	Siouxsie Sioux; Steven Severin; Budgie	Tricky	5:30
2.	"Poems"	Tricky; Terry Hall	Terry Hall, Tricky, Martina Topley-Bird	6:54
3.	"Together Now"	Tricky; Mark Saunders; Neneh Cherry	Neneh Cherry, Tricky	3:09
4.	"Keep Your Mouth Shut"	Tricky; Björk	Björk, Tricky	6:01
5.	"I Be the Prophet"	Tricky	Martina Topley-Bird, Tricky	4:55
6.	"Make a Change"	Tricky; Alison Moyet	Alison Moyet	6:00
7.	"Black Coffee"	Paul Francis Webster; Sonny Burke	Martina Topley-Bird, Tricky	4:50
8.	"Bubbles"	Tricky; Terry Hall	Terry Hall, Tricky	3:25
9.	"I Sing for You"	Tricky; Cath Coffey	Cath Coffey, Tricky, Dedi Madden	6:21
10.	"Yoga"	Tricky; Björk	Björk, Tricky	4:32
Total length:				51:37

US release
No.	Title	Writer(s)	Vocals	Length
11.	"Judas"	Martin Gore	Martina Topley-Bird, Tricky	4:23
12.	"Children's Story"	Ricky Walters	Martina Topley-Bird	4:49
Total length:				60:48

== Personnel ==
Credits are adapted from the album's liner notes.

- Art direction and design – Cally On Art Island
- Co-producer – Pete Briquette (tracks: 1, 6, 8)
- Photography – Maï Lucas
- Recording, Programming & Mixing - Ian Caple
- Producer – Tricky
- Sleeve (concept) – Tricky
- Vocals – Bjork (tracks: 4, 10), Martina Topley Bird (tracks: 2, 5, 7), Terry Hall (tracks: 2, 8), Tricky (tracks: 1 to 5, 7, 8, 10)
- Songwriting – Bjork (tracks: 4, 10), Terry Hall (tracks: 2, 8), Tricky (tracks: 2 to 6, 8 to 10)

== Charts ==
Chart performance for Nearly God
Chart (1996)	Peak position
Australian Albums (ARIA)	77
Belgian Albums (Ultratop Flanders)	35
Dutch Albums (Album Top 100)	90
New Zealand Albums (RMNZ)	48
Norwegian Albums (VG-lista)	34
Swedish Albums (Sverigetopplistan)	27
UK Albums (Official Charts)	10
