= Phoenix Legend =

Chinese musical duo

- Origin: Inner Mongolia and Hunan, China
- Genres: Chinese popular music, dance-pop
- Label: Peacock Records
- Members: Yangwei Linghua; Zeng Yi

Phoenix Legend (simplified Chinese: 凤凰传奇; traditional Chinese: 鳳凰傳奇; pinyin: Fènghuáng Chuánqí) is a Chinese popular music duo, consisting of female vocalist Yangwei Linghua (杨魏玲花) and male vocalist Zeng Yi (曾毅). Their music blends folk music with rap and hip hop elements. In May 2012 Phoenix Legend was reported in the China Daily as having sold more than 6 million albums in China since 2005, and 10 songs from four of their albums have recorded one billion online hits.

Their song "Above the Moon" (Chinese: 月亮之上; pinyin: Yuèliàng Zhī Shàng) brought them national attention after they performed it on the television show Star Boulevard.

Songwriter Zhang Chao has also written three popular songs for the group, including The Most Dazzling Folk Style and Moon Over the Lotus Pond.

== History ==
In 1999, the duo first formed a group called Cool Fire, singing mostly Korean and American pop songs. Songwriter He Muyang heard Ling's voice on TV in 2003 and rewrote Above the Moonlight, a sentimental song he wrote in 1999 for the duo. In 2004, the group signed a contract with Peacock Bluehead and the song became a hit in 2005, after the group toured more than 20 universities in China.

In 2009 the duo had a major hit song entitled The Most Dazzling Folk Style (最炫民族风) (also translated as The Hottest Ethnic Trend or The Coolest Ethnic Trend). The same year they joined the Art Troupe of the Second Artillery Corps, with the duty of entertaining soldiers in the People's Liberation Army's nuclear weapons units.

The duo has gained some recognition outside China. The Most Dazzling Folk Style (最炫民族风) was used by cheerleaders during an NBA Houston Rockets game in April 2012 and also become an Internet sensation after being remixed and re-edited by fans.

== Discography ==
=== Studio albums ===
- Above the Moon (月亮之上) (2005)
- Good Fortune As You So Desire (吉祥如意) (2007)
- The Most Dazzling Folk Style (最炫民族风) (2009)
- Girl's Gentleness, compilation (姑娘的温柔) (2009)
- Sing Loudly (大聲唱) (2011)
- The Best Era (最好的时代) (2014)

=== Singles ===
- "China's Tastes" (中国味道) (2012)
- "Fly Freely" (自由飞翔府) (2007)
