= Liz Jones =

British journalist

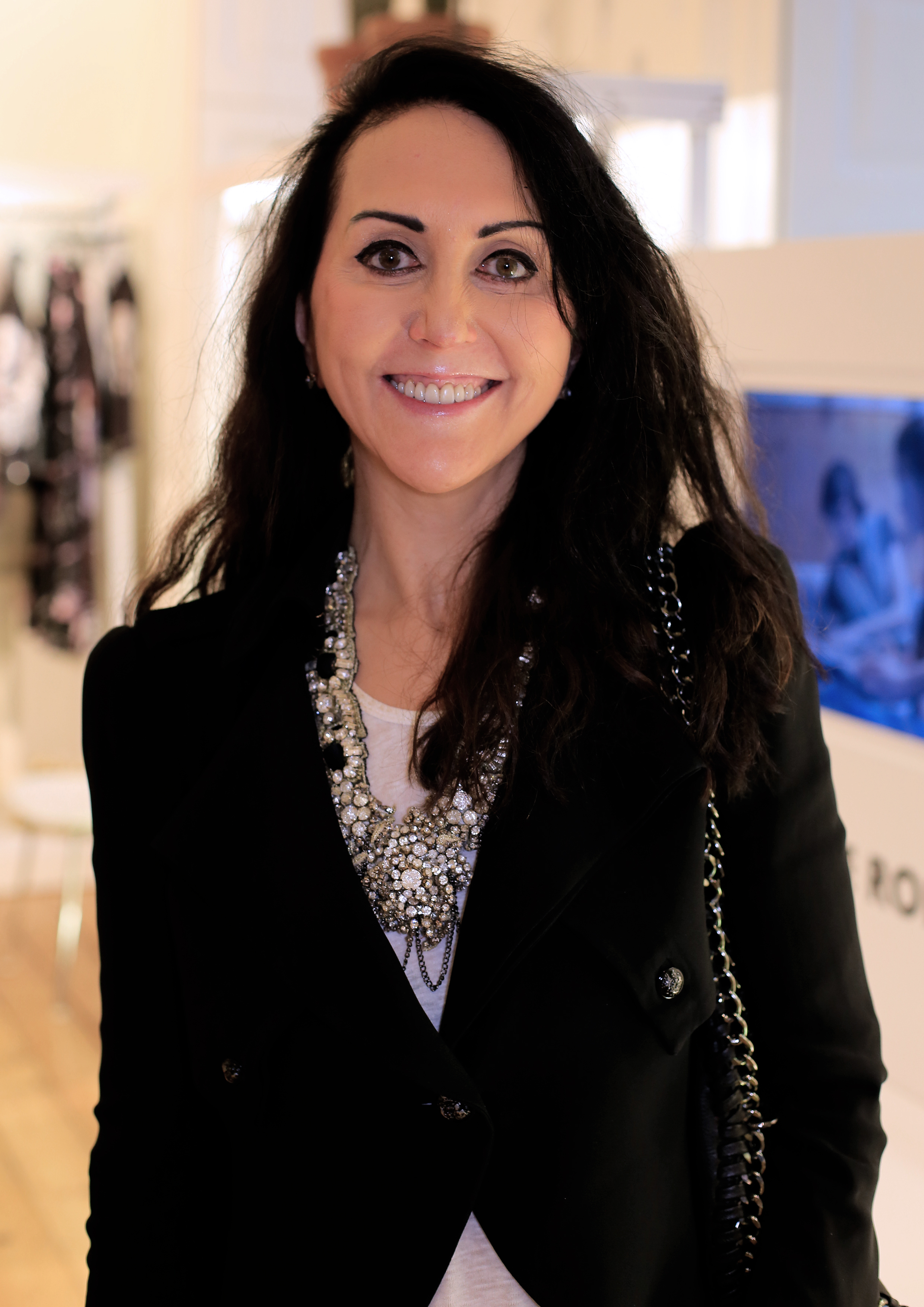
- Jones in 2014
- Born: Elizabeth Ann Jones; 5 September 1958 (age 67); Chelmsford, England
- Education: London College of Printing
- Occupations: Writer, journalist
- Years active: 1981–present
- Spouse: Nirpal Singh Dhaliwal (m. 2002; div. 2007)

Elizabeth Ann Jones (born 5 September 1958) is a British journalist.

She began her career as a fashion journalist, but her work has broadened into confessional writing. Jones divides opinion. While she has gained positive responses, a "beautifully natural writer, as well as a funny one" according to Deborah Ross in The Independent, some of her articles have been fiercely criticised.

A former editor of Marie Claire, she has been on the staff of The Sunday Times and the Evening Standard. As of 2019 Jones writes columns for the Daily Mail and The Mail on Sunday.

== Early life ==
Jones is the youngest of seven children of an Army father and a former ballerina. She grew up in the village of Rettendon, near Chelmsford in Essex, and attended Brentwood County High School for Girls. Jones studied journalism at the London College of Printing.

According to Jones, "I was six when I first realised how hideous I looked", and she has been an anorexic since the age of about 11. By the age of 17 she wished to look like model Janice Dickinson. Discovering Vogue magazine in Southend Public Library in August 1977, was a revelation for her. It "wasn’t just a magazine to me, its cover was a mirror: how I wanted to look, dress and be".

== Early career ==
After leaving college, she began to work for Company in 1981, initially as a sub-editor, eventually becoming a staff writer before leaving to go freelance in 1986.

In 1989, she began an 11-year stint at The Sunday Times Magazine, becoming deputy editor of their "Style" magazine in 1998.

In April 1999, Jones was appointed editor of the UK edition of Marie Claire. An announcement by Jones during June 2000 that the leading fashion magazines were setting up a self-regulatory body concerning the size of models was "contradicted" by the editors of rival magazines. Faced by a declining circulation, she was sacked from this post two years later for refusing to use bulimic models and (according to Jones) listing in the magazine the freebies she had been offered in the previous month. She has continued to write about the fashion industry.

=== Confessional writing and marriage ===
During her period at Marie Claire, Jones began to write about her life, and met the journalist Nirpal Singh Dhaliwal, who had been sent by BBC Radio in 2000 to interview her. Jones embarked on a seven-year relationship with him, and they married in 2002; after a "disastrous" marriage, it ended in 2007. In a 2011 Mail column, Jones admitted to stealing Dhaliwal's sperm in a (failed) attempt to become pregnant. In an article for The Telegraph in July 2021, Dhaliwal wrote of their marriage ceremony as "an occasion I felt swindled into, having never proposed. She arranged it without my knowledge; I found out when I discovered a receipt for the country estate. Confronted with it, she declared she’d already told the world in her column – which I no longer read – and would look a fool. She then broke down in tears, robbing me of my anger as I comforted her and agreed." Dhaliwal and Jones disputed aspects of their relationship in the press while they were still together.

== Later career ==
After four years as Life & Style editor at the London Evening Standard from 2002, she left to join the Daily Mail as Style editor in early 2006 at twice her previous salary. She also writes for British Airways' High Life magazine on destinations and hotels.

=== Notable articles and reception ===
Jones says that she is disliked by the fashion industry: "The fashion industry stinks and everyone in fashion hates me. No one talks to me when I go to the shows. I'm barred from a lot of shows now. I've been barred from Armani, Louis Vuitton, Chloe, Chanel, Marc Jacobs, Victoria Beckham..." Jones has been described by Deborah Orr as a "very gifted writer and apparently very flaky human being". In July 2013, Decca Aitkenhead wrote that "no one deconstructs (fashion's) futile, psychologically destructive false promises more forensically than Jones – and in a mass market tabloid at that".

Often considered somewhat self-obsessed, with the veracity of her confessions questioned, she has been defended by Tanya Gold who wrote: "There are many confessional journalists in Britain, but none as forensic or as self-critical as Jones." Jones wrote about an alleged current love interest, the Rock Star (RS), in her weekly diary in The Mail on Sunday's You magazine from July 2010. Despite dropping many heavy hints that the "rock star" was Jim Kerr of Simple Minds, in a November 2011 interview in the London Evening Standard, she finally admitted it is not Kerr.

Until the end of October 2012, Jones lived in Brushford, just south of Dulverton, Somerset. Her comments about the area and in the book The Exmoor Files angered local people. The journalist Jane Alexander thought Jones opinions were "a clichéd, stereotypical and, frankly, lazy image of the countryside." After moving to the Yorkshire Dales, a Mail on Sunday column on her surroundings was the subject of four articles in The Yorkshire Post in September 2016.

She has reported from Bangladesh, and was sent by her newspaper to cover the famine in Somalia in the summer of 2011; her suitability for this assignment was questioned by Ros Coward.

In June 2012, she attracted attention by slating Holly Willoughby for posting a photo of herself on Twitter without makeup as a "betrayal to women". This Morning TV co-presenter Phillip Schofield defended Willoughby, saying "I swear there can be no greater force against all womankind than Liz Jones. She is inconsistent, bitter, nasty and unhinged".

=== Other activities ===
At the beginning of January 2014, Jones became a contestant in Celebrity Big Brother 13 on Channel 5 TV with comedian Jim Davidson, rapper Dappy, boxer Evander Holyfield, among others. She was the fourth of the contestants to be evicted from the house on 22 January 2014.

Her first novel, 8½ Stone, was published in 2020.

== Personal life ==
Jones says she has been vegetarian since the age of eleven. She was married to journalist Nirpal Singh Dhaliwal between 2002 and 2007. Jones was declared bankrupt in May 2017.

== Bibliography ==
- Slave to the Rhythm. Little, Brown. 1997. ISBN 978-0316640411.
- Liz Jones's Diary: How One Single Girl Got Married. Quadrille. 2005. ISBN 978-1844002238.
- Fur Babies: Why We Love Cats. Quadrille. 2007. ISBN 978-1844005185.
- The Exmoor Files: How I Lost a Husband and Found Rural Bliss. Weidenfeld & Nicolson. 2009. ISBN 978-0297854432.
- Girl Least Likely to: 30 Years of Fashion, Fasting and Fleet Street. Simon & Schuster. 2013. ISBN 978-1471101953.
- 8 1/2 Stone. Authoritize Limited. 2021. ISBN 978-1913623555.
