= Juxtapose (album) =

Studio album by Tricky with DJ Muggs and Grease
- Released: 16 August 1999
- Genre: Trip hop; alternative hip-hop
- Length: 35:38
- Label: Island
- Producer: Tricky (also exec.); Dame Grease; DJ Muggs; Richard Keller

Tricky chronology
Angels with Dirty Faces (1998)	Juxtapose (1999)	Blowback (2001)

DJ Muggs chronology
Muggs Presents... The Soul Assassins Chapter I (1997)	Juxtapose (1999)	Muggs Presents Soul Assassins II (2000)

Grease chronology
Juxtapose (1999)	Live on Lenox (2000)

Singles from Juxtapose
- 1. "For Real" Released: 3 August 1999

Professional ratings
Review scores
Source	Rating
AllMusic	3.5/5 stars
Entertainment Weekly	B
The Guardian	4/5 stars
Melody Maker	4/5 stars
Muzik	5/5 stars
NME	7/10
Q	4/5 stars
Rolling Stone	3/5 stars
Spin	7/10
The Village Voice	A−

Juxtapose is the fourth official studio album by English musician Tricky. It was released on 16 August 1999 via Island Records in collaboration with American record producers DJ Muggs and Dame Grease. It features guest appearances from British rapper Mad Dog, Kioka Williams, who provides the majority of the female vocals on the album and the following tours, and D'NA. The album's lead single, "For Real", was released on 3 August 1999. The song "Contradictive" later appeared in Brokedown Palace and the song "Scrappy Love" appeared in Without a Trace. The album peaked at number 22 in the UK, number 182 in the US, and also reached number 8 in Norway.

== Track listing ==
No.	Title	Writer(s)	Producer(s)	Length
1.	"For Real"	Adrian Nicholas Matthews Thaws; Damon Blackmon; Richard Keller; Lawrence Muggerud	Dame Grease; Rich Keller	3:29
2.	"Bom Bom Diggy" (featuring Mad Dog)	Thaws; Jeff Tetteh; Blackmon	Dame Grease	4:05
3.	"Contradictive"	Thaws; Muggerud	Tricky	3:04
4.	"She Said"	Thaws	Tricky	3:30
5.	"I Like the Girls" (featuring Mad Dog)	Thaws; Tetteh; Blackmon	Dame Grease	2:57
6.	"Hot Like a Sauna" (featuring Mad Dog and Kioka Williams)	Thaws; Tetteh; Blackmon	Dame Grease	4:19
7.	"Call Me" (featuring D'NA)	Thaws; Muggerud	Tricky; DJ Muggs	3:35
8.	"Wash My Soul"	Thaws; Tetteh; Muggerud	Tricky; DJ Muggs	3:51
9.	"Hot Like a Sauna (Metal Mix)" (featuring Mad Dog and Kioka Williams)	Thaws; Blackmon	Dame Grease	3:35
10.	"Scrappy Love"	Thaws; Muggerud	Tricky	3:13
Total length:				35:38

Japanese version bonus tracks
No.	Title	Producer(s)	Length
11.	"Who"	Tricky
12.	"Bombing Bastards"	Terranova

Australian version bonus tracks
No.	Title	Producer(s)	Length
11.	"For Real" (Hip Hop Remix)	Dame Grease; Rich Keller
12.	"For Real" (Genaside II Mix)
13.	"For Real" (Rollo Mix)
14.	"Bombing Bastards"	Terranova
15.	"Pop Musik"	Tricky; DJ Muggs

== Charts ==
Chart (1999)	Peak position
Australian Albums (ARIA)	49
Austrian Albums (Ö3 Austria)	23
French Albums (SNEP)	38
German Albums (Offizielle Top 100)	41
Norwegian Albums (VG-lista)	8
Scottish Albums (OCC)	45
Swiss Albums (Schweizer Hitparade)	35
UK Albums (OCC)	22
US Billboard 200	182
