= Zeng Yi (singer) =

Chinese singer

Zeng Yi 曾毅
- Born: November 6, 1979 (age 45); Yiyang, Hunan, China
- Genres: Mandopop; ethnic music
- Occupation: Singer
- Years active: 2005–present
- Labels: Peacock Records (孔雀唱片)
- Member of: Phoenix Legend

Zeng Yi (Chinese: 曾毅; pinyin: Zēng Yì; born November 6, 1979) is a Chinese singer. He sings in Mandarin Chinese as well as English, and he is a member of the Chinese popular music duo Phoenix Legend along with Yangwei Linghua.

== Biography ==
Zeng was born in Yiyang, Hunan in China on November 6, 1979. In his early years, he was a radio worker. When he worked in Guangzhou, he made the acquaintance of Yangwei Linghua.

In 2011, he joined the Chinese People's Liberation Army Naval Song and Dance Troupe.

== Personal life ==
On November 20, 2011, Zeng married Li Na (李娜) in Yiyang.
