= Yangwei Linghua =

Chinese singer (born 1980)

Yangwei Linghua 杨魏玲花
- Born: 20 December 1980 (age 45); Ordos, Inner Mongolia, China
- Genres: Mandopop; ethnic music
- Occupation: Singer
- Years active: 2005–present
- Labels: Peacock records (孔雀唱片)
- Member of: Phoenix Legend

Yangwei Linghua (simplified Chinese: 杨魏玲花; traditional Chinese: 楊魏玲花; pinyin: Yángwèi Línghuā Mongolian: Үүлэнхуар Üülenkhuar; born 20 December 1980) is a Chinese singer. She sings in Mandarin Chinese and Mongolian, and she is a member of the Chinese popular music duo Phoenix Legend. Her music partner is Zeng Yi.

== Biography ==
Yangwei Linghua was born on 20 December 1980 in Ordos, Inner Mongolia. She is ethnically Mongolian. In her early years, she worked in Guangzhou as a saleswoman after high school. In 2011, she joined the CPC Central Military Commission Political Department Song and Dance Troupe.

== Personal life ==
Yang's husband is Xu Mingzhao (徐明朝), a businessman, entrepreneur, and the CEO of Bairen Entertainment. In March 2011, they married in Ordos City.
