= Slave to the Rhythm (book) =

Slave to the Rhythm (UK title) Purple Reign (US title)
- Author: Liz Jones
- Language: English
- Genre: Biography
- Publisher: Little, Brown, & Co., U.K. Citadel Press, Carol Publishing Group, in US
- Publication date: 1997
- Media type: Print, ebook
- ISBN: 0316640417

Slave to the Rhythm: The Artist Formerly Known as Prince (published as Purple Reign in the U.S.), is a biography of the musician Prince by British journalist Liz Jones The title chosen by Citadel for the US edition, Purple Reign, had already been employed by Jon Bream, a critic from Minneapolis who had observed and recorded Prince's early career in Prince: Inside the Purple Reign (1984).
