= M.O.D. Technologies =

- Founded: 2010
- Founder: Bill Laswell
- Distributor(s): Redeye Distribution (US) Studio !K7 (Europe) P-Vine Records (Japan)
- Country of origin: U.S.
- Location: New York City
- Official website: www.mod-technologies.com

M.O.D. Technologies is an independent record label based in New York City and intended to be the modern evolution of producer and bassist Bill Laswell's Axiom label. It was founded in 2010 by Laswell and RareNoiseRecords founder Giacomo Bruzzo, in part to provide a creative outlet for the group Method of Defiance, which began as a loose collective of musicians and had at that point coalesced to include Dr. Israel, Garrison Hawk, Toshinori Kondo, Bernie Worrell and DJ Krush among its members. The first incarnation of the group debuted at the 2007 Synch Festival in Athens, Greece.

In a February 2012 interview with PopMatters, Laswell mentioned the possibility of reissuing the Axiom catalog through M.O.D. The label is home to recording projects by Method of Defiance, Praxis, Lee "Scratch" Perry and Gigi, as well as remixes by Scientist, Prefuse 73, and Mad Professor.

After a brief period of reorganization at the end of 2012, the label has re-emerged with plans to release a number of albums and digital tracks. The tail end of 2012 saw the release of "Ertale" by young and upcoming Ethiopian rockers Jano as well as Bill Laswell's re-imagining of music for the film "Koyaanisqatsi", entitled "Tuwaqachi: The Fourth World". This later release was released only in digital format (as part of the main label, the digital only sub-label not having been established yet) and has and will continue to be performed only in a live setting to (a re-edited version) of the movie in a live setting approved by the director. Though physical output has slowed, the main label still remains active as of 2016.

In mid-2014, a digital only sub-label was created called "MOD Technologies Digital: The Incunabula Series", the intent of which is to "...present rare and unique, one time only captured events, in some cases originally experienced by a fortunate few and recover unusual, lost until now studio recordings. Documenting as far back as the early 80s up to present time. Moments seldom heard or experienced by anyone.". To date (mid-2016), the digital only arm has had more than 30 releases, including archival material from Praxis, Bill Laswell/DJ Krush and Laswell/Bernie Worrell/Karsh Kale as well as new, live performances from Method of Defiance and duos consisting of Laswell & Milford Graves and Laswell and Wadada Leo Smith.
