= Tricky (rapper) =

British musician and record producer (born 1968)

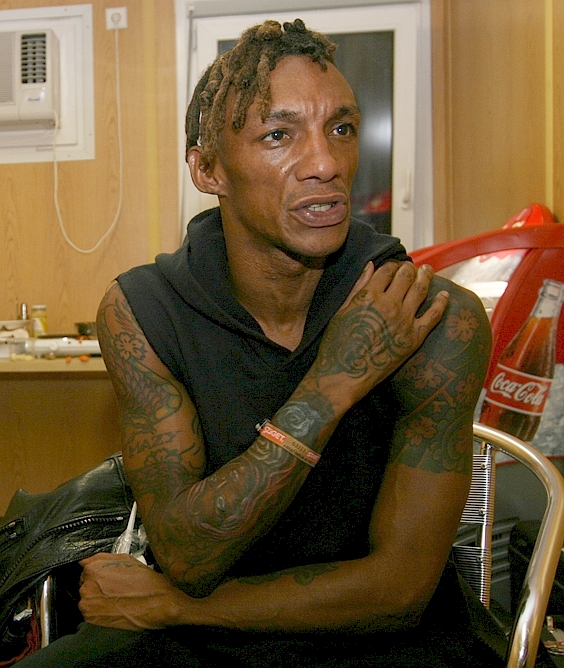
- Tricky in 2009

Background information
- Also known as: Tricky Kid; Tricky Rock
- Born: Adrian Nicholas Matthews Thaws; 27 January 1968 (age 58); Bristol, England
- Genres: Trip hop; electronic; experimental hip-hop
- Occupations: Producer; mixer; musician; vocalist; actor
- Years active: 1985–present
- Labels: False Idols; Domino; Epitaph; Island
- Formerly of: Whale; Massive Attack
- Spouse: Carmen Ejogo (m. 1998; div. 1998)
- Website: trickysite.com

Adrian Nicholas Matthews Thaws (born 27 January 1968), better known by his stage name Tricky, is an English musician, record producer, vocalist and rapper. He was born and raised in Bristol, in southwest England. Through his work with Massive Attack and other artists, Tricky became a major figure in the Bristol underground scene, which gave rise to multiple internationally recognized artists and the music genre of trip hop.

Tricky embarked on a solo career with his debut album, Maxinquaye, in 1995. The release won Tricky popular acclaim and marked the beginning of a lengthy collaborative partnership with vocalist Martina Topley-Bird. He released four more studio albums before the end of the decade, including Pre-Millennium Tension and the pseudonymous Nearly God, both in 1996. He has gone on to release nine studio albums since 2000, most recently Different When It’s Silent (2026). In 2016, he joined Massive Attack on stage for the first time in two decades while continuing his solo career.

Tricky is a pioneer of trip hop music, and his work is noted for its dark, layered musical style that blends disparate cultural influences and genres, including hip-hop, alternative rock, and ragga. He has collaborated with a wide range of artists over the course of his career, including Terry Hall, Björk, Gravediggaz, Alanis Morissette, Grace Jones and PJ Harvey.

== Early life ==
Tricky was born Adrian Nicholas Matthews Thaws on 27 January 1968 in Knowle West, Bristol, to a Jamaican father and a Ghanaian-English mother. His mother, Maxine Quaye, died either by suicide or due to epilepsy complications when Tricky was four. His father, Roy Thaws, operated the Studio 17 sound system (formerly known as "Tarzan the High Priest") with his brother Rupert and his own father, Hector. Bristol musician Bunny Marrett claimed in 2012, "It became the most popular sound system in Bristol at the time."

Tricky experienced a difficult childhood in Knowle West, an economically deprived area in Southern Bristol. He became involved in crime at an early age, joining a gang that was involved in car theft, burglary, fights, and promiscuity. Tricky spent his youth in the care of his grandmother, who often let him watch old horror films instead of going to school. At 15, he began to write lyrics ("I like to rock, I like to dance, I like pretty girls taking down their pants", MixMag, 1996). When he was 17, he spent some time in prison after purchasing forged £50 notes from a friend, who later informed the police. Tricky stated in an interview afterward, "Prison was really good. I'm never going back."

== Career ==
=== 1987–1994: The Wild Bunch, Massive Attack ===
In the mid-1980s, Tricky met DJ Milo and spent time with a sound system called the Wild Bunch, which, by 1987, evolved into Massive Attack. He received the nickname "Tricky Kid," and, at age 18, became a member of the Fresh 4, a rap group built from the Wild Bunch. He also rapped on Massive Attack's acclaimed debut album, Blue Lines (1991).

In 1991, before the release of Blue Lines, he met Martina Topley-Bird in Bristol. Some time later, she came to his house and mentioned to Tricky and Mark Stewart that she could sing. Martina was only 15 years old, but her "honey-coated vox" impressed them, and they recorded a song called "Aftermath" (although The Face '95 mentions that the first song they recorded together was called "Shoebox"). Tricky showed "Aftermath" to Massive Attack, but they were not interested. In 1993, he decided to press a few hundred vinyl copies of the song. In 1995, a white label record got him a contract with Island Records, and he started to record his first solo album, Maxinquaye.

=== 1995–2001: Solo breakthrough ===
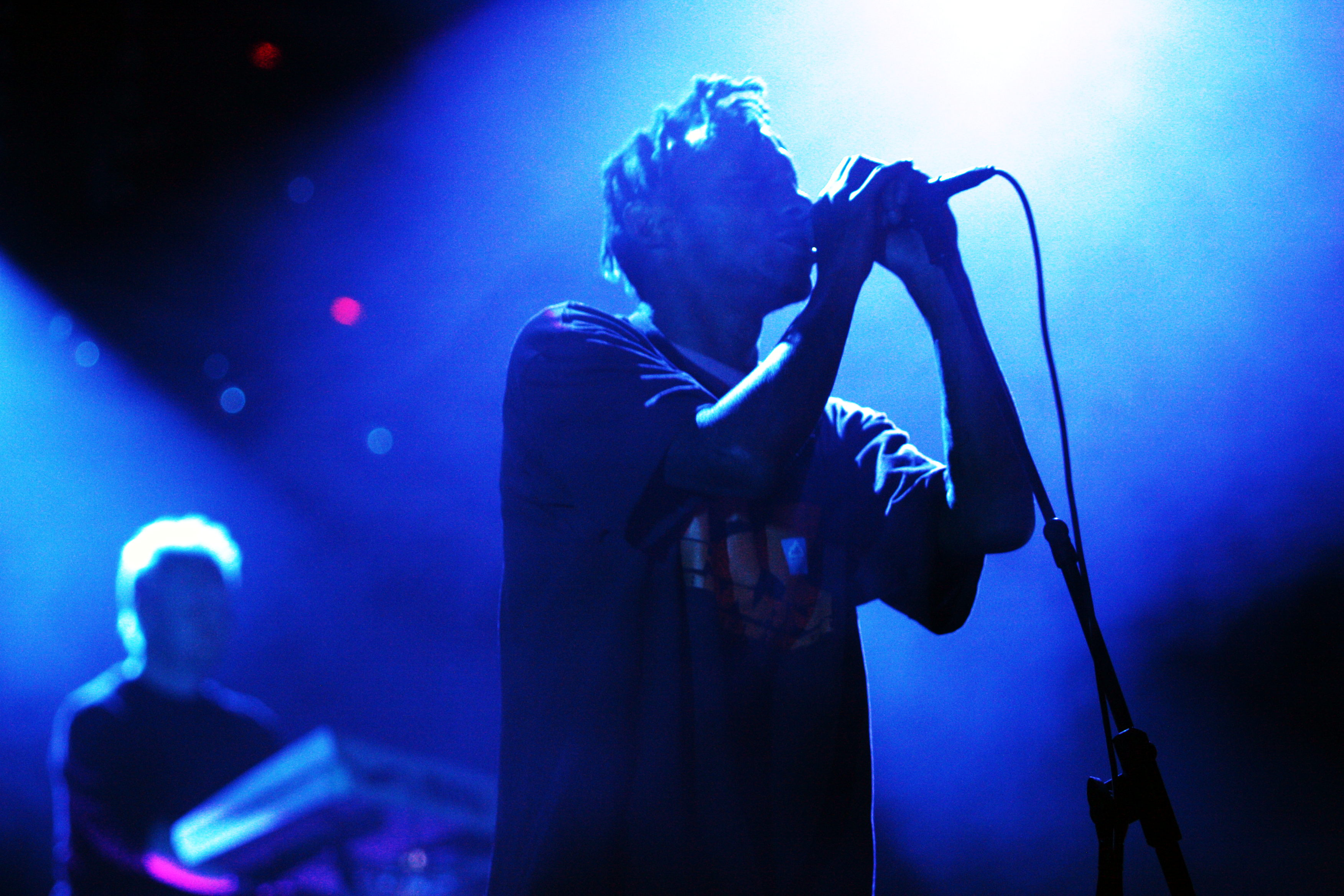
Tricky performing in 2008

Tricky left Massive Attack to release his debut album, Maxinquaye, co-produced by himself and Mark Saunders and prominently featuring singer Martina Topley-Bird. The album was successful, and Tricky consequently attained international fame, something he was notably uncomfortable with. The Maxinquaye album review by Rolling Stone read: "Tricky devoured everything from American hip-hop and soul to reggae and the more melancholic strains of '80s British rock".

Authors David Hesmondhalgh and Caspar Melville wrote in the book Global Noise: Rap and Hip-Hop Outside the USA: "Tricky showed his debt to hip-hop aesthetics by reconstructualising samples and slices of both the most respected black music (Public Enemy) and the tackiest pop (quoting David Cassidy's "How Can I Be Sure?")." As the Rolling Stone article further explained, Tricky created "a mercurial style of dance music that immediately finds its own fast feet."

Tricky failed to complete a number of lyrics begun for the Massive Attack album Protection and gave the band some of the lyrics he had written for Maxinquaye instead, meaning there is significant overlap in the lyrics of songs on the two albums—specifically with "Overcome" on Maxinquaye and "Karmacoma" on Protection; and "Hell is 'Round the Corner" on Maxinquaye and "Eurochild" on Protection. Tricky found it difficult to cope with the huge success of Maxinquaye and subsequently eschewed the laidback soul sound of the first album to create an increasingly edgy and aggressive punk style of music.

In 1996, Neneh Cherry and Björk appeared as guests on his second album Nearly God. The opening number was a cover of the Siouxsie and the Banshees pre-trip-hop song "Tattoo" that had previously inspired Tricky when he forged his style. By the time Pre-Millennium Tension was released in 1996, Tricky was increasingly irritated with the British press, particularly articles written in The Face magazine. The Face had been an early champion of Maxinquaye, but saw Tricky as more a duo than a solo project. The Face published an article claiming that vocalist Martina Topley-Bird had to single-handedly bring up the child that Tricky had fathered.

In 2001, Tricky appeared on the Thirteen Ghosts soundtrack with the song "Excess" which (briefly) features Alanis Morissette during two of the choruses. In 2002, that song also appeared on the Queen of the Damned soundtrack.

=== 2002–2011: Mixed Race and other work ===
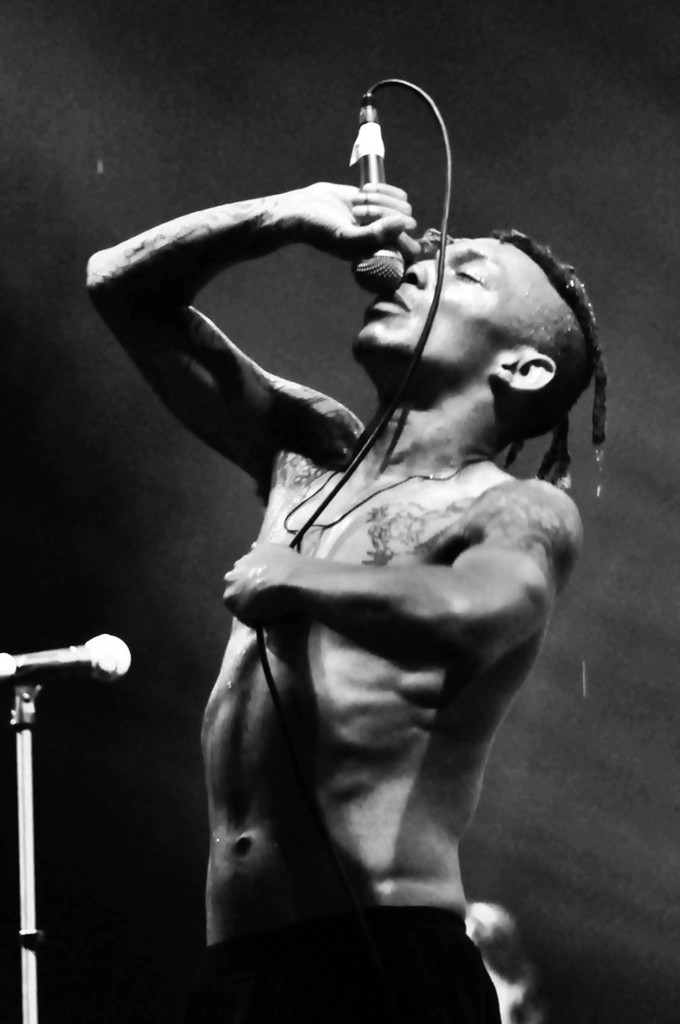
Tricky at the 2009 INmusic festival in Zagreb, Croatia

Tricky's studio album Knowle West Boy was released in the UK and Ireland in July 2008, and September 2008 in the US. The first single from the album was "Council Estate" and features the artist as the sole vocalist: "It's the first single I've ever done with just me on vocals. I couldn't whisper that song. I had to come out of myself and do a loud, screaming vocal. I wanted to be a proper frontman on that one." In an interview with The Skinny in July 2008, Tricky mentioned that Knowle West Boy was the first album for which he decided to enlist a co-producer. Ex-Suede guitarist Bernard Butler was Tricky's initial selection, but, less than enamoured with Butler's technical prowess, Tricky finished the album by totally re-recording all of the material.

On 8 December 2009, Tricky's 1995 debut album Maxinquaye was reissued with a bonus 13-track CD featuring B-sides, outtakes and seven previously unreleased mixes of songs such as "Overcome", "Hell is Round the Corner" and "Black Steel".

In December 2009, the media reported that Massive Attack met Tricky in Paris and asked him to work on a future project—Daddy G said: "Things seem like they've healed between us and Tricky. It's been quite well documented how us and Tricky get on, hasn't it? It's not that well, but things have changed. Things have softened up. We saw Tricky a couple of weeks ago in Paris and it was quite an amicable meeting after five or six years." Tricky agreed to record with the band and he revealed in a June 2013 interview that "there's a couple of songs which are OK, which are really good actually to be honest with you". However, Tricky also stated in June 2013 that he could not spend more than two or three days with Massive Attack and described band member Daddy G as "very arrogant".

Tricky's ninth album Mixed Race was released on 27 September 2010 and the first single from the album became available on 23 August. The album includes contributions from Franky Riley, Terry Lynn, Bobby Gillespie, Hamadouche, Blackman and Tricky's youngest brother Marlon Thaws.

In June 2011, Tricky's then label Brownpunk signed on Mexican band My Black Heart Machine for one single, "It Beats Like This", which Tricky co-produced. My Black Heart Machine was then commissioned by the label to cover a song from Maxinquaye for an album of covers by Brownpunk's roster; the band chose "Hell Is Round the Corner". "It Beats Like This" was released independently by the band on their first EP in April 2013.

Tricky produced rapper Omni's album IamOmni (produced by Tricky) (released under the moniker IamOmni) that was available from 30 August 2011 as a free download on Omni's official site.

=== 2011–present: False Idols, live events, Ununiform ===
On 26 June 2011, Tricky appeared on stage during American singer Beyoncé's historic 2011 Glastonbury Festival Performance on the pyramid stage for the track "Baby Boy". Partly the result of technical difficulties with his microphone, he later stated he was "mortified" by his own performance, saying, "I've never been so embarrassed. My body just froze".

In April 2012, Tricky performed Maxinquaye with Martina Topley-Bird at several concerts around the UK including, for the first time in several years in his home town of Bristol. The concerts featured regular interruptions orchestrated by Tricky, where he brought his youngest brother, Marlon Thaws to rap on stage alongside other local rappers as well as encouraging the audience to come up on stage. The review of the concert in Manchester said it was "shambolic" and a "car crash" with Tricky often leaving the stage and continuously forgetting his words, leaving Topley Bird to carry the delivery of the tracks, resulting in many leaving early after repeated issues with Tricky's behaviour and shouts of "wanker" from the crowd.

In February 2013, Tricky announced the release of a new album, False Idols. The album is the follow-up from his 2010 Mixed Race and featured Peter Silberman, Fifi Rong and Nneka. Tricky released this statement about the album:

"This new album I'll stand behind every track. I don't care whether people like it. I'm doing what I want to do, which is what I did with my first record. That's what made me who I was in the beginning. If people don't like it, it don't matter to me because I'm back where I was."

In spring 2014, it was announced that Tricky is to perform at a number of festivals throughout Europe over the summer of 2014, including Control Day Out in Romania, festival Couleur Café in Belgium, Positivus Festival in Latvia and Galtres Parklands Festival in England, the latter of which he co-headlines with contemporaries Morcheeba.

Tricky announced a new album titled Adrian Thaws in June 2014. It was released on 8 September 2014. Skilled Mechanics was released in January 2016. The same month was released a song Tricky had written with 3D from Massive Attack, on the band's EP Ritual Spirit.

His thirteenth official studio album, ununiform, was released on 22 September 2017, and featured collaborations with Asia Argento, Avalon Lurks, and Martina Topley-Bird, as well as a cover of Hole's "Doll Parts". Polish singer Marta Złakowska joined Tricky's band on a 2017 tour as a guest singer. She stepped in at the last minute when the originally planned singer dropped out.

Blink, an imprint of Bonnier Books UK, has acquired Tricky's autobiography. Commissioning Editor Kerri Sharp acquired World rights from K7 Music – the independent music company headquartered in Berlin, where Tricky now lives. The book is currently untitled and will sell as a £20 Hardback in October 2019.

His EP 20,20 was released on 6 March 2020. It featured the song Lonely Dancer recorded with the female singer Anika. She had previously worked with Beak in 2010. Tricky's next album, Fall to Pieces, was released in September 2020. The album featured singers Marta and Oh Land.

In October 2021, Tricky released a new album under the artist name 'Lonely Guest'. The self-titled album featured collaborations with Lee "Scratch" Perry, Idles' frontman Joe Talbot and Maxïmo Park's Paul Smith. It featured songs with previous album vocalists Marta and Oh Land.

In October 2025, Tricky and Polish singer Marta Złakowska released the joint album Out the Way via False Idols, which The Observer praised as “the pair’s best work yet, displaying a rewarding rigour that often eludes Tricky.”

In April 2026, Tricky announced his fifteenth studio album, Different When It’s Silent, out 17 July 2026 via False Idols.

== Side projects and film career ==
Tricky has guest-starred on a number of albums, including an appearance on Live's fifth studio album, V. This appearance came as Tricky and Live's lead singer Ed Kowalczyk had developed a close friendship, with Kowalczyk contributing vocals to "Evolution Revolution Love", a track on Tricky's album Blowback.

Tricky has also acted in various films. He appeared in a significant supporting role in the 1997 Luc Besson film The Fifth Element, playing the right-hand man "Right Arm" to evil businessman Mr. Zorg.

He also appears briefly in the 2004 Olivier Assayas film Clean, playing himself, and had a large role in the music video for "Parabol/Parabola" by Tool. He was also rumoured to have a brief cameo in John Woo's 1997 movie Face/Off, but has denied that this was the case, although his single "Christiansands" was featured in the movie. Tricky also appeared as Finn, a musician who loves and then dumps main character Lynn, in the US sitcom, Girlfriends.

In 2001, Tricky appeared in online advertising for the web series We Deliver, about a cannabis delivery service in New York City. Though he did not appear in any episodes, in the advertising it appears as if he is a customer of the service.

The launch of a record label named Brown Punk was announced in mid-2007 that was a collaboration between Tricky and former Island Records executive Chris Blackwell. At the time, Tricky said: "Brown Punk represents a positive movement where you find intellectuals mixing with the working class, rock mixing with reggae and indie mixing with emo." The Dirty, The Gospel, Laid Blak Mexican band My Black Heart Machine were acts that were signed to the label, but as of October 2013, the label appears to be inactive.

In March 2023, the album When It's Going Wrong was released on False Idols. It is a collaboration between Tricky and Marta; a polish singer he has worked with since 2017. In April 2023 The German electro pop duo Berlin Banter released the single I'll Wait featuring Tricky.

== Personal life ==
Tricky has stated that he has "been through a lot... I've been moved around from family to family, never stayed in one house from when I was born to the age of 16. ...I'm not normal. It's got a lot to do with my upbringing....Staying somewhere for three years then going off for three years. My uncles being villains. All that stuff. I've got quite a dysfunctional family....for some reason, in my family, the mothers always give the kids to the grandmothers".

Tricky has fourteen paternal siblings.

He was in a brief relationship with Icelandic singer-songwriter Björk in the 1990s. When asked in mid-2013 about the time the pair spent together, Tricky stated: "I wasn't good for Björk. I wasn't healthy for her. I feel she was really good to me, she gave me a lot of love and she really was a good person to me. I think she cared about me, right?" He was also married to Carmen Ejogo in early 1998 in Las Vegas. They divorced that same year.

Tricky fathered a daughter, Mina Mazy, on 19 March 1995 with Martina Topley-Bird, a musician he discovered when she was sitting on a wall near his Bristol home. Mina struggled with mental illness and took her own life on 8 May 2019 following a psychotic episode. Following her death, Tricky stated "It feels like I'm in a world that doesn't exist, knowing nothing will ever be the same again. No words or text can really explain, my soul feels empty."

In 2015, Tricky moved to live in Berlin, Germany, and later moved to Toulouse, France.

== Discography ==
=== Studio albums ===
Year	Album	Peak positions												Sales	Certifications (sales thresholds)
Year	Album	UK	AUS	AUT	BEL (Fl)	BEL (WA)	CAN	FRA	NLD	NOR	SWE	SWI	US	Sales	Certifications (sales thresholds)
1995	Maxinquaye	3	48	—	29	42	53	—	64	—	18	—	—	US: 222,000	BPI: Gold
1996	Nearly God	10	77	—	35	—	37	—	90	34	—	—	—	US: 54,000	
1996	Pre-Millennium Tension	30	63	—	—	42	—	—	64	—	31	—	140	US: 218,000	BPI: Silver
1998	Angels with Dirty Faces	23	35	—	32	—	69	14	—	38	54	—	84	US: 113,000	
1999	Juxtapose (with DJ Muggs and Dame Grease)	22	49	35	—	—	—	38	—	8	—	35	182	US: 55,000	
2001	Blowback	34	28	5	27	29	—	16	43	29	—	33	138	US: 95,000	
2003	Vulnerable	88	86	67	21	28	—	22	—	—	—	27	—		
2008	Knowle West Boy	63	93	35	35	89	—	31	86	—	—	25	147		
2009	Tricky Meets South Rakkas Crew	—	—	—	—	—	—	—	—	—	—	—	—		
2010	Mixed Race	118	—	—	61	69	—	33	—	—	—	99	—		
2013	False Idols	66	—	34	17	43	—	93	—	—	—	30	149		
2014	Adrian Thaws	107	—	—	44	47	—	54	—	—	—	63	—		
2016	Skilled Mechanics (featuring DJ Milo and Luke Harris)	—	—	—	156	120	—	—	—	—	—	—	—		
2017	Ununiform	—	—	—	114	52	—	127	—	—	—	47	—		
2020	Fall to Pieces	69	—	—	35	45	—	113	—	—	—	49	—		
2021	Lonely Guest (as Lonely Guest)	—	—	—	—	—	—	—	—	—	—	—	—		
2024	Fifteen Days (as Theis Thaws)	—	—	—	—	—	—	—	—	—	—	—	—		
2026	Different When It's Silent	—	—	—	—	—	—	119	—	—	—	—	—		

=== Singles and EPs ===
==== 1993–2000 ====
Year	Song	UK	AUS	FRA	IRE	SWE	Album
1994	"Aftermath"	69	154	—	—	—	Maxinquaye
1994	"Ponderosa"	77	—	—	—	—	Maxinquaye
1995	"Overcome"	34	—	—	—	—	Maxinquaye
1995	"Black Steel"	28	101	—	—	—	Maxinquaye
1995	"Pumpkin"	26	—	—	—	—	Maxinquaye
1995	The Hell E.P. (vs. The Gravediggaz)	12	112	—	27	—	EP only
1995	I Be the Prophet EP (as Starving Souls)	66	—	—	—	—	Nearly God
1996	"Poems" (as Nearly God)	28	—	—	—	60	Nearly God
1996	Grassroots EP	—	—	—	—	—	EP only
1996	"Christiansands"	36	128	—	—	—	Pre-Millennium Tension
1996	"Tricky Kid"	28	—	—	—	—	Pre-Millennium Tension
1997	"Makes Me Wanna Die"	29	125	—	—	—	Pre-Millennium Tension
1998	"Money Greedy"	25	89	—	—	—	Angels with Dirty Faces
1998	"Broken Homes"	25	89	56	—	—	Angels with Dirty Faces
1998	"6 Minutes" (US only)	—	—	—	—	—	Angels with Dirty Faces
1999	"For Real"	45	—	—	—	—	Juxtapose
1999	"Bom Bom Diggy / Hot Like A Sauna" (UK promo only)	—	—	—	—	—	Juxtapose
2000	Mission Accomplished EP	—	—	83	—	—	EP only
"—" denotes releases that did not chart or were not released in that country

==== 2001–present ====
Year	Song	UK	BEL (FLA)	FRA	NLD	US Alt.	Album
2001	"Evolution Revolution Love"	—	—	—	79	35	Blowback
2002	"You Don't Wanna"	—	—	—	—	—	Blowback
2002	"Mixed Up Faces" (as Rico vs. Tricky)	—	—	—	—	—	single only
2003	"Antimatter"	97	—	—	—	—	Vulnerable
2003	"How High"	—	—	—	—	—	Vulnerable
2008	"Council Estate"	—	—	—	—	—	Knowle West Boy
2008	"Slow"	—	—	—	—	—	Knowle West Boy
2009	"Puppy Toy"	—	—	—	—	—	Knowle West Boy
2009	"C'mon Baby"	—	—	—	—	—	Knowle West Boy
2010	"Murder Weapon"	—	—	76	—	—	Mixed Race
2010	"Ghetto Stars"	—	—	—	—	—	Mixed Race
2011	"Time to Dance"	—	—	—	—	—	Mixed Race
2011	"Mediate" (INXS featuring Tricky)	—	—	—	—	—	Mediate: The Ralphi Rosario Remixes
2013	"Nothing's Changed"	—	—	—	—	—	False Idols
2013	"Nothing Matters"	—	39	—	—	—	False Idols
2013	"Parenthesis"	—	—	—	—	—	False Idols
2014	"Beijing to Berlin" (featuring Ivy)	—	—	—	—	—	Skilled Mechanics
2020	"20,20"	—	—	—	—	—	
"—" denotes releases that did not chart or were not released.

== Guest Appearances/Production ==
Artist	Song	Year
Leena Conquest	Boundaries (Remix)	1994
Angelique Kidjo	Agolo (Remix)	1994
Terry Hall	Ghost Town	1995
Whale	Tryzasnice; Kickin'	1995
Björk	Enjoy; Headphones	1995
Elvis Costello	Distorted Angel (Tricky Remix)	1996
Bush	In a Lonely Place	1996
Interstella	Grandmaster (Durban Poison Remix)	1996
Garbage	Milk (Wicked Mix)	1996
Neneh Cherry	Together Now	1996
Neneh Cherry	Devotion; I Wanna Know	1997
Notorious B.I.G.	Hypnotize (Remix)	1997
Black Grape	Marbles (Remix)	1997
Cath Coffey	Summer Nights	1997
Cam'ron	Horse & Carriage (Remix)	1998
Method Man	Judgement Day (Remix)	1998
Terranova	Bombing Bastards	1999
Live	Simple Creed	2001

== See also ==
- List of trip hop artists

== Bibliography ==
- Chemam, Melissa, Massive Attack: Out of the Comfort Zone, Tangent Books (2019) ISBN 1910089729, ISBN 978-1910089729
- Tricky, Hell Is Around The Corner, Blink Publishing (2019)
