= Salt (Oh Land song) =

2019 song by Oh Land

Song by Oh Land

from the album Family Tree
- Released: 3 May 2019
- Length: 2:50
- Label: Tusk or Tooth
- Songwriter(s): Nanna Øland Fabricius; Thomas Bartlett
- Producer(s): Thomas Bartlett

"Salt" is a song by Danish singer and songwriter Oh Land for her fifth studio album, Family Tree (2019). Oh Land wrote the song with Thomas Bartlett, the sole producer. Her boyfriend, Adi Zukanovic, plays piano on it with Bartlett and Hungarian conductor Peter Pejtsik. The song represents a change in style from her previous work and features a string-led production with Oh Land's distinctive breathy vocals. The lyrics to the song are a metaphor, describing the unpredictable nature of life's events. The song was performed by Oh Land during a live show at Koncerthuset in Copenhagen.

A remix of "Salt", created by American producer Arthur Moon, was released on the two musicians' collaborative remix extended play, Replanting Family Tree (2019). It was self-released as the EP's lead single on 4 September 2019, a week after the initial announcement. The remix is an electropop track with newly-added synths and it received generally favourable reviews from music critics.

== Background and release ==
Following the release of her fourth studio album Earth Sick in 2014, Oh Land devoted her time to a number of side projects, such as recording the soundtracks for Askepot (2016) and Watermusic (2018), and a rendition of Denmark's national anthem for the 2018 television series The Rain. In 2018, she confirmed that her then-upcoming album would be formally released in 2019 and was inspired by the recent events of her personal life, such as the divorce from her husband, her second pregnancy, and relocating back to Denmark. To initiate songwriting sessions, Oh Land began to focus on learning how to play the piano again, resulting in a sound and tonal shift for the album.

During the first week of January 2019, Oh Land unveiled Family Tree in a press release and released its lead single "Human Error". "Salt" was released as the seventh track on Oh Land's fifth studio album Family Tree on 3 May 2019. It was written by Oh Land and Thomas Bartlett, with the latter serving as the song's sole producer. Oh Land also received additional credits for creating the song's melody and lyrics. "Salt" was mastered by UE Nastasi at Sterling Sound Studios in Edgewater, New Jersey. It was mixed by Patrick Dillett and Peter Pejtsik serves as the track's conductor.

== Composition and lyrics ==
Musically, "Salt" has been referred to as a string-led track that departs from the styles and genres previously explored by Oh Land on Earth Sick. Lucia Odoom from Politiken described "Salt" as one of the several original compositions on Family Tree that sound euphoric. She also said the song sounds like it is a Neo-Christian piece. In the chorus, Oh Land's vocals were described as very breathy by Carson Aguilar from Qrewcial. The song's instrumentation consists of a piano, synthesizer, and spinet. Bartlett, Adi Zukanovic and Pejtsik make up the trio of pianists on the track, while Zukanovic also plays the spinet.

According to its sheet music, "Salt" is set in the time signature of common time, and has a moderate tempo of 144 beats per minute. The song is composed in the key of G major and it follows the setup of a verse, followed by chorus-verse-chorus and a post-chorus. The chorus features Oh Land harmonizing with several layers of her own vocals. The song's lyrics are a metaphor for the unpredictability of life's events. In the lyrics, Oh Land personifies her lover as salt water and herself as a river: "Salt is in the water, your ocean with no end / Meet my rivers sweeter, but our waters won't ever blend."

== Reception and promotion ==
In addition to the track "Brief Moment", Aguilar called "Salt" one of the highlights of Family Tree. He enjoyed Oh Land's vocals on the song, saying that they "stack in the most pleasant way" possible. Oppositely, Odoom found that the combination of the song's strings and Oh Land's voice creates an unintentional effect on the listener; she explained that although her vocal style sounded beautiful, they did not match the euphoric sound of the song.

In September 2019, Oh Land performed a live show at Koncerthuset in Copenhagen. At the concert, she sang "Salt" during the Family Tree segment, in between performances of singles "Family Tree" and "Brief Moment". Ivan Rod, a contributor to Gaffa, reviewed her live show and found that it could have benefitted from being performed in a more intimate setting, due to the songs' quiet nature. He wrote that although they were unable to meet the fullness of the performance space, the Family Tree songs ended up being some of the highlights of the show.

== Arthur Moon remix ==
"Salt (Arthur Moon Remix)"

Single by Oh Land and Arthur Moon

from the EP Replanting Family Tree
- Released: 4 September 2019
- Genre: Electropop
- Length: 2:15
- Label: Self-released
- Songwriter(s): Nanna Øland Fabricius; Thomas Bartlett
- Producer(s): Thomas Bartlett

Oh Land singles chronology
"Kiss in Songs" (2019)	"Salt (Arthur Moon Remix)" (2019)	"Wishes" (2019)

Arthur Moon singles chronology
"Reverse Conversion Therapy" (2019)	"Salt (Arthur Moon Remix)" (2019)	"Infield" (2020)

=== Development and release ===
Later in 2019, American musician Arthur Moon remixed four of the tracks that appear on Family Tree. The remixes were created as part of the collaborative remix extended play Replanting Family Tree (2019), released by both Oh Land and Moon. BlackBook first reported on the release of the EP on 27 August 2019. The Arthur Moon remix of "Salt" was released as the lead single the following week, on 4 September. The remix was independently self-released, under Oh Land's name, for digital download and streaming. On the EP, which was released on 18 September 2019, the remix of "Salt" appears as the first of five tracks. The remix's single artwork was created by the Danish graphic design firm Hvass&Hannibal, designers of the parent EP's cover. Alongside the announcement of the remix, Oh Land and Moon announced they would embark on a promotional tour of the United States together, with Moon serving as the opening act for all scheduled dates. According to the North American College and Community Radio Chart, the "Salt" remix was distributed for airplay to campus radio stations in the US on 24 September 2019.

Moon's remix of "Salt" was described as one of the electropop tracks on Replanting Family Tree. It adds "electro-handclaps, jittery beats, and piercing synth-blasts" to the original composition. The central idea behind the remix, in addition to the other three remixes by Moon, was to completely "reimagine" the song. Additionally, the remixes have a strong electronic sound, unlike their original forms on Family Tree. Regarding her opportunity to collaborate with Oh Land, Moon explained: "It was such a privilege to get to dig into the magical worlds Oh Land and Thomas Bartlett created on these recordings."

=== Critical reception ===
The Arthur Moon remix of "Salt" was met with generally favourable reviews from music critics. Ken Scrudato, a writer for BlackBook, raved about the remix, calling it his "new obsession" and insisting that the remix would be featured on his playlists to listen to during the upcoming autumn season. Continuing, he asserted that the remix "commands... or demands nothing less than complete immersion". Eric Keith from Vinyl Chapters called the remix mesmerizing and "again, extremely catchy". He continued, writing: "no matter what style of music you gravitate to, you'll likely enjoy this one. It is capable of putting you in a trance-like state if you'll let it and is a haunting and inventive piece." During the remix's release week, Andy Malt from Complete Music Update featured it in his weekly column which highlights new music.

=== Release history ===
Release dates and formats for "Salt (Arthur Moon remix)"
Region	Date	Format(s)	Label	Ref.
Various	4 September 2019	Digital download; streaming	Self-released	
United States	24 September 2019	Campus radio	Tusk or Tooth	

== Credits and personnel ==
Credits adapted from the liner notes of Family Tree.

- Nanna Øland Fabricius – lyrics, melody, music
- Thomas Bartlett – production, additional arrangements, piano, synthesizer
- Adi Zukanovic – piano, spinet
- Patrick Dillett – mixing
- Peter Pejtsik – conductor, piano
- UE Nastasi – mastering
