= Loop Soup =

Studio album by Oh Land
- Released: 29 September 2023
- Genres: Electropop; synth-pop
- Length: 35:30
- Labels: Tusk or Tooth; Universal
- Producers: Vasco; Adnan Zukanovic

Oh Land chronology
Xtra (2022)	Loop Soup (2023)

Singles from Loop Soup
- 1. "Bleeed" Released: 14 April 2023; 2. "My Freak" Released: 23 June 2023; 3. "Bucket List" Released: 25 August 2023; 4. "Deep Sleep" Released: 31 January 2025

Loop Soup is the sixth studio album by Danish singer and songwriter Oh Land. It was released on 29 September 2023 through Tusk or Tooth Records and the Universal Music Denmark. A musical departure from her 2019 album Family Tree, the electropop and synth-pop record was influenced by 1960s and 1970s films, and contains elements of disco, electro, and psychedelic music. Individual songs on the album were compared to the works of ABBA, Dagny, Giorgio Moroder, and Tove Lo. Loop Soup was produced by Nick Labajewska "Vasco" Madsen and her husband Adnan Zukanovic, and features guest collaborations with Broods and Ximena Sariñana.

Loop Soup drew mixed reviews from critics. The album was supported by three singles prior to its release – "Bleeed", "My Freak", and "Bucket List" – and the promotional single "I'd Rather Sing". A music video was produced for the song "Pressure's On", and a rerecorded version of "Deep Sleep" was released as a single in 2025 as it appears in the Danish film For evigt (2023). Oh Land toured Denmark in September and October 2023 to promote the record.

== Background ==
In 2022, Oh Land released her first entirely Danish-language extended play, Xtra. The next year, she resumed releasing music written in English, remarking that ultimately the songs themselves decide what language she writes in.

== Songs and lyricism ==
Critics described Loop Soup as an electropop and synth-pop record. According to the singer, songs on the album were influenced by 1960s and 1970s films, and specifically the German disco group Boney M. It is a musical departure from her previous studio album, Family Tree (2019), which contained ballads and slower pop melodies. Critics also compared songs on Loop Soup to the works of ABBA and Giorgio Moroder. Lyricism themes include critiques of social media, beauty standards for women, and the concept of being a starving artist. Several of the album's songs were produced by Nick Labajewska Madsen under the name Vasco.

Loop Soup opens with "I'd Rather Sing", a song about what is expected of an artist thrown into the industry. It opens with a "pulsating beat" before Oh Land delivers her vocals. The album's second song is "Bleeed", which has a danceable electro beat, and was compared to the works of Scandinavian singers Tove Lo and Dagny. Its lyrics address the place of social media in society and how it contributes to unhealthy relationships, with Oh Land hoping that listeners will question their own media consumption. The third single "Bucket List" discusses existentialism and finds Oh Land addressing her lover about his bucket list, if she were to unexpectedly die before him. It is a synth-pop song that contains elements of psychedelic and nu-disco music. "My Freak" is a disco song backed by electric guitar and synth sounds with encouraging lyrics about loving someone for who they are, including their imperfections.

== Promotion and singles ==
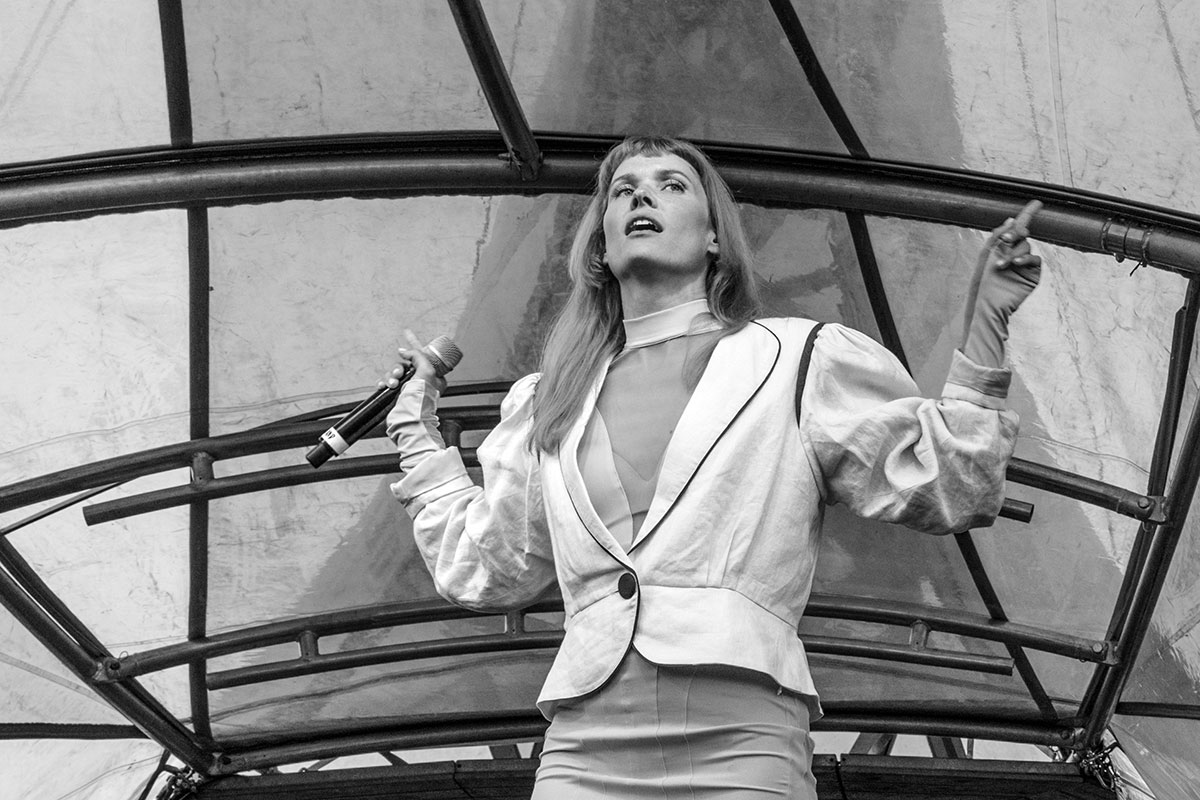
Oh Land performing with the Aarhus Jazz Orchestra in 2023.

Loop Soup was released in its entirety on 29 September 2023 through Tusk or Tooth Records and Universal Music Denmark. It was made available for digital consumption as well as a translucent LP. Danish artist Lasse Høgh handled the layout and packaging design of the LP edition, with the photographs of Oh Land, including its cover artwork, performed by Dennis Morton. Following the release of Loop Soup, Oh Land returned as a judge on the seventeenth season of the Danish reality competition television series, X Factor.

Three singles were released from Loop Soup prior to September. "Bleeed" was released as the album's lead single, on 14 April 2023. It was promoted by its first live performance at the Rock in Tivoli concert at Tivoli Gardens in May 2023, followed by an announcement of Oh Land's Danish tour with dates between October and November of that year. The second single, "My Freak", was released on 23 June along with the first details regarding Loop Soup, which was officially announced. "Bucket List" was released as the following single on 25 August 2023. On the eve of her wedding to producer Adnan Zukanovic, the song was performed live in her backyard in Copenhagen. Additionally, "I'd Rather Sing" was released as a promotional single on 19 September, premiering exclusively for streaming on the music website mxdwn.com. A music video for "Pressure's On", partially created using artificial intelligence, was developed by Ida Kvetny and released in November 2023. It features a gynoid dancer "gracefully dancing a ballet sequence against an otherworldly backdrop of cloud-like formations". On 31 January 2025, an alternative recording of "Deep Sleep" was released as a single, as it appears in the 2023 Danish film For evigt, of which she also receives an acting credit.

== Critical reception ==
Professional ratings
Review scores
Source	Rating
Ekstra Bladet	2/6 stars
Gaffa	3/6 stars

Loop Soup received generally mixed reviews from music critics. Mandy Rogers from EQ Music called it a "glorious album [with] some real gems on it", highlighting songs "I'd Rather Sing", "Bucket List", "Waiting", "100% Terrible", and "Artists Don't Smile". Rogers found some of the songs to "exhibit the style" of Oh Land's older works, which she enjoyed and ultimately wrote: "I highly recommend giving it a listen". In a more mixed review, Kristina Grønning from Gaffa rated Loop Soup three out of six stars and opined, "You never know what Oh Land will serve up next. Will it be flamboyant pop? Danish or English? Introverted piano ballads or maybe an opera? With 15 years behind, her discography is broad to say the least". Ekstra Bladet's Thomas Treo provided a score of two out of six stars, and was critical of the album's dance sound, which he described as "competently performed" but "dated and unfashionable" in comparison to recent releases by Jessie Ware and Kylie Minogue; he wrote that "her ever-skyward phrasing and retro-futuristic space pop never take off definitively."

== Track listing ==
Loop Soup track listing
No.	Title	Writer(s)	Producer(s)	Length
1.	"I'd Rather Sing"	Nanna Øland Fabricius; Adnan Zukanovic	Zukanovic	3:40
2.	"Bleeed"	Fabricius; Lara Andersson; Nick Labajewska Madsen	Vasco	3:08
3.	"Bucket List"	Fabricius; Andersson; Madsen	Vasco	2:31
4.	"Waiting"	Fabricius; Zukanovic	Zukanovic	3:12
5.	"My Freak"	Fabricius; Madsen; Lina Hansson	Vasco	3:35
6.	"Better Days" (featuring Broods)	Fabricius; Zukanovic; Georgia Nott	Zukanovic	3:21
7.	"Pressure's On"	Fabricius; Zukanovic	Zukanovic	3:45
8.	"Deep Sleep"	Fabricius; Zukanovic	Zukanovic	3:07
9.	"Artists Don't Smile"	Fabricius; Andersson; Madsen	Vasco	2:51
10.	"100% Terrible"	Fabricius; Zukanovic	Zukanovic	3:15
11.	"Pretty Is Dead" (featuring Ximena Sariñana)	Fabricius; Zukanovic; Ximena Sariñana	Zukanovic	3:05
Total length:				35:30

- Credits adapted from the LP's liner notes.

== Credits and personnel ==
Credits adapted from AllMusic and the LP's liner notes.

- Nanna Øland Fabricius – performer, writer, composer, synthesizer programming
- Lara Andersson – writer, composer (tracks 2, 3, 9)
- Anders Boll – mixing
- Broods – performer (track 6)
- Lina Hansson – writer, composer (track 5)
- Nick Labajewska "Vasco" Madsen – writer, composer (tracks 2, 3, 5, 9), programming, synthesizer programming
- Georgia Nott – writer, composer, vocals (track 6)
- Ximena Sariñana – performer, writer, composer, vocals (track 11)
- Emil Thomsen – mastering engineer
- Adnan Zukanovic – writer, composer, producer (tracks 1, 4, 6–8, 10, 11), programming, synthesizer programming

== Release history ==
Release dates and formats for Loop Soup
Region	Date	Format(s)	Label(s)	Ref.
Various	29 September 2023	Digital download; streaming	Tusk or Tooth; Universal Music	
Various	29 September 2023	LP	Tusk or Tooth; Universal Music	
