= My Freak =

Song by Oh Land

Single by Oh Land

from the album Loop Soup
- Released: 23 June 2023
- Genre: Disco
- Length: 3:36
- Label: Tusk or Tooth; Capitol Records Denmark
- Songwriters: Nanna Øland Fabricius; Lina Hansson; Nick Labajewska Madsen
- Producer: Vasco

Oh Land singles chronology
"Bleeed" (2023)	"My Freak" (2023)	"Bucket List" (2023)

"My Freak" is a song by Danish singer and songwriter Oh Land. It serves as the second single to her upcoming sixth studio album, Loop Soup (2023), and was released on 23 June 2023 through her Tusk or Tooth label and Capitol Records Denmark. She wrote the song with Lina Hansson and the song's producer, Nick Labajewska Madsen.

== Background and release ==
Oh Land's first release of 2023 was the single "Bleeed" in April, which was intended to serve as the lead single for her upcoming studio album project. "My Freak" was then released as a digital single on 23 June 2023 through her Tusk or Tooth label and Capitol Records Denmark. Alongside the release of the single, Oh Land announced details regarding her sixth studio album, Loop Soup, of which "My Freak" appears. She revealed songs on the album were influenced by 1960s and 1970s films, and the German disco group Boney M.

Oh Land wrote the song with Lina Hansson and the song's producer, Nick "Vasco" Labajewska Madsen.

== Composition and lyrics ==
"My Freak" is a disco song that contains instrumentation from an electric guitar and "distant [...] synthesized sound notes". Staff members from Fizzy Mag felt the song's "lush melody and [...] slick rhythm" blended well with the singer's vocals. Lyrically, Oh Land finds herself questioning normalcy and establishing deeper connections with those who have "quirks and edges"; according to the singer, "My Freak" is a love song about "finding [her] own logic and natural love with someone". Simon Li from Mxwdn.com summarised the song's meaning as "an ode to love by encouraging lovers to embrace each other as they are with all their oddities and imperfections."

== Critical reception ==
Li found the song to be "easy to move along [to]" and commented on her vocals, calling them beautiful.

== Release history ==
Release dates and formats for "My Freak"
Region	Date	Format(s)	Label	Ref.
Various	23 June 2023	Digital download; streaming	Tusk or Tooth	
