= Kiss in Songs =

2019 single by Oh Land

Single by Oh Land

from the album Family Tree
- Released: 22 March 2019
- Genre: Electronic
- Length: 4:12
- Label: Tusk or Tooth
- Songwriter(s): Nanna Øland Fabricius; Thomas Bartlett
- Producer(s): Thomas Bartlett

Oh Land singles chronology
"Brief Moment" (2019)	"Kiss in Songs" (2019)	"Salt (Arthur Moon Remix)" (2019)

"Kiss in Songs" is a song by Danish singer and songwriter Oh Land for her fifth studio album, Family Tree (2019). Oh Land wrote the song with the sole producer, Thomas Bartlett. It was digitally distributed as the third single from the album on 22 March 2019, through Tusk or Tooth Records. The song's release came with the announcement of new dates for her ongoing promotional Family Tree tour. It is an electronic song with a melancholic, piano and string-led production. Venezuelan-American singer-songwriter Devendra Banhart provides background vocals on the song.

The lyrics of "Kiss in Songs" detail Oh Land's desire to find someone who she can communicate with on a musical basis. It also serves as a reminder to Oh Land about what is important to her. The song received generally favourable reviews from music critics, with some reviewers calling it beautiful and happy. Oh Land has since performed the song at the Koncerthuset in Copenhagen in September 2019.

== Background and release ==
After the release of Earth Sick (2014), her fourth studio album, Oh Land divided her time up for a number of side projects, including the recording of soundtracks Askepot (2016) and Watermusic (2018), and a cover of Denmark's national anthem for the 2018 television series The Rain. In 2018, she revealed to Rolling Stone that her then-upcoming album would be released in 2019 and was inspired by several recent events of her personal life, such as the divorce from her husband, her second pregnancy, and relocating back to Denmark. As she began songwriting sessions, Oh Land started to focus on relearning how to play the piano, which resulted in a sound and tonal shift for the album.

"Kiss in Songs" was first announced to the public in a press release that stated it would be the third single from Family Tree. The song was released for digital download and streaming in Denmark and the United States on 22 March 2019, through Tusk or Tooth Records. The song's cover art uses an original, hand-embroidered design that was created by Danish artist Sarah Becker. "Kiss in Songs" served as the third single from Family Tree, following the releases of "Human Error" and "Brief Moment". The song's release came alongside the addition of more European tour dates for Oh Land's promotional Family Tree tour, which was first announced on 22 February 2019. On 3 May 2019, "Kiss in Songs" was included as the fourth track on Oh Land's fifth studio album Family Tree.

In the song's press release, Oh Land explained that it serves as a reminder for her as to why she makes music: "I guess the whole reason I do music is that I express myself more clearly through melodies and singing." It was written by Oh Land and Thomas Bartlett, the latter of which solely produced the track. Oh Land received additional credits for creating the melody and lyrics for "Kiss in Songs". The song was mastered by UE Nastasi at Sterling Sound Studios in Edgewater, New Jersey. It was mixed by Patrick Dillett, while Peter Pejtsik served as the track's conductor.

== Composition and lyrics ==
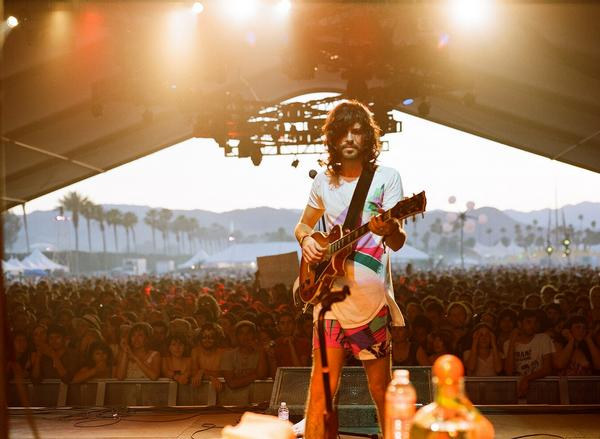
Venezuelan-American singer-songwriter Devendra Banhart (shown) provides background vocals on "Kiss in Songs".

Musically, "Kiss in Songs" is a melancholic electronic song that is backed by piano and strings. Ole Rosenstand Svidt from Gaffa placed the song among the most ecclesiastical in Oh Land's discography. Of similar nature, Simon Bækgaard from SoundVenue described the song's melody as something one would associate with Sunday High mass. He also stated that the instrumental introduction reminded him of a hymn. "Kiss in Songs" is accompanied by a piano, played by Bartlett, who was also in charge of additional musical arrangements.

According to its sheet music, "Kiss in Songs" is set in the time signature of common time, and has a moderately slow tempo of 80 beats per minute. The song is composed in the key of C major and it follows the setup of a verse, followed by chorus-verse-chorus and a post-chorus. Venezuelan-American singer-songwriter Devendra Banhart provides background vocals on the track.

Lyrically, "Kiss in Songs" features Oh Land describing how her potential love interest is able to communicate with her through music as opposed to just speaking. With the song, she attempts to "forget [about] the ways we are used to using language" and instead "communicate on a more primal level". Oh Land explained the overall meaning of "Kiss in Songs": "In this song, I find someone who understands my language." In the song's chorus, Oh Land admits to her lover: "And while history is written / And politics is spitten / We kiss in songs / And I'm missing you."

== Reception and promotion ==
"Kiss in Songs" was met with generally favourable reviews from music critics. Svidt featured the song in his column of the week's 12 best new songs, for Gaffa, during the third week of March 2019. In his review, he called Oh Land's voice pleasant-sounding due to her shift towards a more organic creative direction. He also considered the song among Oh Land's other music that sounds magical. Bækgaard labelled the song beautiful and explained that it may contain some of the best chords he had heard in a while. Emma Sejersen, a writer for Politiken, enjoyed the song, calling it one of the happiest-sounding tracks on Family Tree. Erin Vierra, from Mxdwn.com, also called "Kiss in Songs" a beautiful song, and said it "lifts the listener up and refuses to let go".

In September 2019, Oh Land performed a live show at Koncerthuset in Copenhagen. During the concert, she opened the night with a performance of "Kiss in Songs", followed by fellow album tracks "Sunlight" and "Make My Trouble Beautiful". Ivan Rod, a contributor to Gaffa, reviewed her performance and found that the aforementioned songs could have benefitted from being performed in a more intimate setting, due to their quiet nature. He wrote that although the songs were unable to meet the fullness of the performance space, they ended up being some of the highlights of Oh Land's show.

== Credits and personnel ==
Credits adapted from the liner notes of Family Tree.

- Nanna Øland Fabricius – lyrics, melody, music
- Thomas Bartlett – production, additional arrangements, piano
- Patrick Dillett – mixing
- UE Nastasi – mastering
- Peter Pejtsik – conductor
- Devendra Banhart – background vocals

== Release history ==
Release dates and formats for "Kiss in Songs"
Region	Date	Format(s)	Label	Ref.
Denmark	22 March 2019	Digital download; streaming	Tusk or Tooth	
United States	22 March 2019	Digital download; streaming	Tusk or Tooth	
