= 1980s in film =

The decade of the 1980s in Western cinema saw the return of studio-driven pictures, coming from the filmmaker-driven New Hollywood era of the 1970s. The period was when the "high concept" picture was popularized by the likes of producers Don Simpson and Jerry Bruckheimer, where films were expected to be easily marketable and understandable. Therefore, they had cinematic plots that could be summarized in one or two sentences. Since then, this method has become the most utilized formula for modern Hollywood blockbusters. At the same time in Eastern cinema, the Hong Kong film industry entered a boom period that significantly elevated its prominence in the international market.

== Trends ==
The cinema of the 1980s covered many subgenres, with hybrids crossing between multiple genres. The course strengthened towards creating ever-larger megahit films, which earned more in their opening weeks than most previous movies due in part to scheduling releases when there were less competition for audience interest.

- Action: In the 1970s, action films usually focused on maverick police officers. However, the genre did not become dominant in Hollywood until the 1980s, when it was promoted by action stars such as Arnold Schwarzenegger, Sylvester Stallone, Chuck Norris, and Bruce Willis. Schwarzenegger built an iconic career out of action classics such as The Terminator (1984), Commando (1985), and Predator (1987). Stallone starred in First Blood (1982) about a returning Vietnam War veteran fighting a small town sheriff, as well as its sequels Rambo: First Blood Part II and Rambo III. Previously seen as a taboo in the 1970s, Vietnam War flicks like Oliver Stone's Platoon and Stanley Kubrick's Full Metal Jacket made the conflict a popular subject in the 1980s. Norris starred in the Missing in Action trilogy (1984, 1985, 1988) about a Vietnam veteran going back to rescue POWs. The release of Die Hard in 1988 was particularly influential on the development of the genre in the subsequent decade. In the film, Willis plays a New York City police detective who inadvertently becomes embroiled in a terrorist take-over of a Los Angeles office building. Riding the buddy cop wave that was boosted by the likes of the Lethal Weapon franchise, Stallone and Kurt Russell's Tango & Cash became one of the two last Hollywood films to be released in the 1980s. Meanwhile, Hong Kong action cinema was being revolutionized by filmmakers Jackie Chan, Tsui Hark, and John Woo; garnering increased attention all over the world with the likes of Project A (1983), Police Story (1985), A Better Tomorrow (1986), and The Killer (1989). Which featured increasingly complex martial arts and gunfight choreography with generally unsafe and most often uninsured stunt work. Blazing the trail for newer types of action movies like the heroic bloodshed subgenre.
- Animation: In the 1970s, full-length animated films usually focused on adult fare due to the influence of Ralph Bakshi films. However, even though they didn't become popular until the late-1990s and 2000s due to public preference of TV animation, some well-known films were made during the 1980s, especially with Don Bluth. After he left Disney in 1979, Bluth formed his first animation studio and produced the moderately-successful The Secret of NIMH (1982). Bluth later teamed up with Steven Spielberg to produce An American Tail (1986) and The Land Before Time (1988) which both became box-office successes, and proved there was still confidence in animation for theaters. After breaking up with Spielberg, Bluth independently produced All Dogs Go To Heaven (1989). Meanwhile, the Disney studio was having horrible times and the box-office failure of The Black Cauldron (1985) almost put the studio in jeopardy. However, in later years, the modest success of The Great Mouse Detective (1986), and their collaboration with Spielberg on the live-action/animated film Who Framed Roger Rabbit (1988) directed by Robert Zemeckis, which was a critical and box office hit, gave Disney enough confidence in its feature animation division. A year later in the penultimate month of the 1980s, the studio released The Little Mermaid (1989), directed by Ron Clements and John Musker, which eventually started an era known as the Disney Renaissance. Inspired by the success of 1979's The Bugs Bunny/Road Runner Movie, Looney Tunes compilation films continued with The Looney Looney Looney Bugs Bunny Movie (1981), Bugs Bunny's 3rd Movie: 1001 Rabbit Tales (1982), Daffy Duck's Fantastic Island (1983) and Daffy Duck's Quackbusters (1988). That decade also saw a brief resurgence of popular-toys-based films. Nelvana's The Care Bears Movie (1985) was successful enough to warrant two sequels: Care Bears Movie II: A New Generation (1986) and The Care Bears Adventure in Wonderland (1987). Additional well-known popular-work based films include Bon Voyage, Charlie Brown (and Don't Come Back!!) (1980), Heavy Metal (1981), The Adventures of Mark Twain (1985), The Secret of the Sword (1985), The Transformers: The Movie (1986), The Chipmunk Adventure (1987) and The BFG (1989); While other well-known original films include The King and the Mockingbird (1980), American Pop (1981), The Last Unicorn (1982), The Plague Dogs (1982), Rock & Rule (1983), Fire and Ice (1983), Starchaser: The Legend of Orin (1985) and The Brave Little Toaster (1987). The '80s also saw a resurgence of Japanese anime films: Inspired by the rarely successful release of his first film 1979's The Castle of Cagliostro, Hayao Miyazaki went to produce Nausicaä of the Valley of the Wind (1984) for Topcraft. The film's huge success convinced Hayao Miyazaki to form Studio Ghibli which would then produce several critically acclaimed films of the decade including Castle in the Sky (1986), My Neighbor Totoro (1988), Grave of the Fireflies (1988) and Kiki's Delivery Service (1989). Other well-known anime films of that decade include Golgo 13: The Professional (1983), Macross: Do You Remember Love? (1984), Lensman (1984), Vampire Hunter D (1985), Royal Space Force: The Wings of Honneamise (1987), Akira (1988) and Little Nemo: Adventures in Slumberland (1989). Additionally, the first-ever theatrical animated franchise: the Doraemon film series (based on the anime and manga series of the same name) began in 1980 with the release of Doraemon: Nobita's Dinosaur (1980).
- Blockbusters: The decade started by continuing the blockbuster boom of the mid-1970s. The sequel to 1977's Star Wars, The Empire Strikes Back, opened in May 1980 becoming the highest-grossing film of the year. It is considered among the greatest films of all time (being the highest rated 1980s film on IMDb). It was followed by Return of the Jedi (1983) finishing the Star Wars original trilogy. Superman II was released in Europe and Australia in late 1980, but not distributed in the United States until June 1981. Though now seen as campier over the original 1978 Superman, Superman II was received with a positive reaction. From the success of The Empire Strikes Back, creator George Lucas teamed up with director Steven Spielberg to create one of the most iconic characters in the 1981 film Raiders of the Lost Ark starring Harrison Ford, who had also co-starred in The Empire Strikes Back. The story about an archaeologist and adventurer, Indiana Jones (Ford), hired by the U.S. government to go on a quest for the mystical lost Ark of the Covenant, created waves of interest in old 1930s style cliffhanger serials as well as treasure hunting adventures like 1984's Romancing the Stone. It became the highest-grossing film of 1981, leading to sequels all in the top-10 films of the decade. In 1982, Spielberg directed his fairy-tale, sci-fi family blockbuster E.T. the Extra-Terrestrial, which shattered all records, earning 40% more than any Star-Wars film, and double or triple the revenue of 46 of the top 50 films.
- Comedy: The disaster films of the past decade were spoofed in the gag comedy Airplane!, paving the way for more of the same style of humor in such releases as Airplane II: The Sequel (1982), Top Secret! (1984) and The Naked Gun: From the Files of Police Squad! (1988). Popular comedy stars in the '80s included Leslie Nielsen, John Candy, Steve Martin, Eddie Murphy, Rick Moranis, Bill Murray, Chevy Chase and Dan Aykroyd. Many had come to prominence on the NBC TV series Saturday Night Live, including Bill Murray, Steve Martin and Chevy Chase. Eddie Murphy made a success of comedy-action films including 48 Hrs. (1982) and the Beverly Hills Cop series (1984–1993). Also in the top-50 films were the romantic comedies "Crocodile" Dundee (1986), Crocodile Dundee II (1988) and Arthur (1981). Influenced largely by 1978's National Lampoon's Animal House, the decade also saw the continued rise of teen sex comedies like Fast Times at Ridgemont High, Porky's and Revenge of the Nerds (the later two of these had sequels). Also popular were the films of John Hughes such as Ferris Bueller's Day Off (1986). Heathers (1988) provided a tongue-in-cheek approach to the teenage comedy genre, showcasing the murders (disguised as suicides) of several popular students at a U.S. high school. Other notable comedies of the decade include the gender-swap film Tootsie (1982), Broadcast News (1987), and a brief spate of age-reversal films including Big, 18 Again!, Vice Versa and Like Father, Like Son. Also notable were the Police Academy series of broad comedies, produced between 1984 and 1993.
- Dance: Many movies during the 1980s were centered around dancing and heavily influenced by MTV music videos. Flashdance (1983), Footloose (1984), and Dirty Dancing (1987) were all extremely successful as well as their soundtracks.
- Drama: Among the historical, romantic, and dramatic films, several were well received at the box office, including Rain Man (1988), On Golden Pond (1981), Terms of Endearment (1983), The Color Purple (1985) and Out of Africa (1985). Also notable in critical success were Gandhi (1982), Sophie's Choice (also 1982) and A Passage to India (1984). Steven Spielberg's Always was one of the two last Hollywood films to be released in the 1980s.
- Fantasy: Fantasies saw a resurgence particularly in sword and sorcery films. In 1981, Dragonslayer and Excalibur started it off, but it was 1982's Conan the Barbarian which caused the fantasy explosion. The epic starred Arnold Schwarzenegger in his acting breakthrough as he began his ascent to stardom. Loosely based on the original tales by Robert E. Howard, the film was written by the unlikely pairing of Oliver Stone and John Milius. Its sequel followed in 1984 with the light-weight Conan the Destroyer. Schwarzenegger returned again to a similar sword-wielding role in 1985's Red Sonja. The same year as Conan the Barbarian, similar films followed such as The Sword and the Sorcerer, The Beastmaster and the Ator films. Fairy-tale fantasy was also popular with films such as The NeverEnding Story (1984), Legend (1985) and The Princess Bride (1987). Disney's Return to Oz, a big-budget sequel to 1939's classic The Wizard of Oz, was a major flop, yet became a major success on home video. Jim Henson's Labyrinth (1986) was not an initial success but has since become a major cult classic. Hong Kong's A Chinese Ghost Story (1987) blended fantasy with several other genres such as horror, action, comedy, and romance to great effect, becoming an international favorite all over Asia.
- Horror: Creativity from 1970s horror films extended throughout the 1980s, except having more gore, with many successful 1980s horror films having numerous sequels as their murderers were themselves unstoppable. Stanley Kubrick directed his horror film The Shining (1980). The creative and violent The Evil Dead (1981) with its secluded atmosphere is seen by many as one of the best in its genre, leading to its inevitable sequel Evil Dead II in 1987. Halloween director John Carpenter's The Thing (1982) shocked audiences in its effects, as did David Cronenberg's graphic and gory Scanners (1981). Sequels to Halloween (1978), Friday the 13th (1980), and A Nightmare on Elm Street (1984) were the popular face of horror films in the 1980s, unkillable as their antagonists were, a trend reviled by most critics. Dan O'Bannon's The Return of the Living Dead and Stuart Gordon's Re-Animator soon followed. In 1986, the James Cameron film Aliens was released a few weeks before David Cronenberg's remake of The Fly. Films such as Ghostbusters, Joe Dante's Gremlins (both 1984) and Tim Burton's Beetlejuice (1988) started a trend for horror comedies. Child's Play (1988) started the popular killer doll franchise starring Brad Dourif as the infamous killer doll Chucky.
- James Bond: The James Bond film series entered its third decade in 1981 with Roger Moore starring in the more realistic For Your Eyes Only after the outlandish excess of Moonraker in 1979. The decade saw the beginning of a new era for Bond since the previous decade's directors originally directed a 1960s Bond; the new director brought to the series, John Glen, criticized for a less stylistic and more "workman" style of direction, directed all the EON Bond films from 1981 to 1989. Moonraker was the last for regular Bernard Lee who portrayed Bond's boss M. For the 1980s Bonds, a collection of numerous MI6 superiors would brief Bond on his missions. 1983 was a significant year for the series as a non-EON Bond was released, Never Say Never Again, directed by The Empire Strikes Back director Irvin Kershner, with Sean Connery returning to the role for the first time since 1971's Diamonds Are Forever; it was competing with the next EON film, Octopussy at the box office with media dubbing the situation "The Battle of the Bonds". Even lesser known in the same year was one-time Bond George Lazenby appearing in the TV reunion film The Return of the Man from U.N.C.L.E. as Bond-like character "JB". A View to a Kill (1985) was the last for Roger Moore before Timothy Dalton was chosen as the new Bond in 1987's The Living Daylights and lastly in 1989's Licence to Kill.
- Martial Arts: In Hong Kong, most action stars were either already skilled or at least partially trained in kung fu. Many also worked as fight choreographers with backgrounds in stage combat such as the comedic trio of Jackie Chan, Sammo Hung, and Yuen Biao (a.k.a. the Three Dragons) who were all part of The Seven Little Fortunes troupe as children. Though the likes of Jet Li and Yuen Woo-ping were more known for being in front of or behind the camera respectively. Not to be left out, female action stars such as Michelle Yeoh, Cynthia Rothrock, Yukari Oshima, Moon Lee, and Cynthia Khan established the girls with guns trend during the latter half of the decade, which also heavily showcased hand-to-hand combat sequences. Meanwhile, Hollywood found its footing in the martial arts subgenre with the likes of Chuck Norris, Jean-Claude Van Damme, and Steven Seagal. All across-the-board, notable films include Shaolin Temple, Zu Warriors from the Magic Mountain, Wheels on Meals, Big Trouble in Little China, Dragons Forever, Bloodsport, and Miracles.
- Rite-of-Passage: Beyond just the teenager coming-of-age stories, more complex rite-of-passage films had older actors changing or transforming through the rituals. So although teenagers were the focus of 1983's Risky Business, 1984's The Karate Kid and its sequels (1986, 1989), and 1985's The Breakfast Club and St. Elmo's Fire featuring the Brat Pack, older people with troubled lives were the subjects of Top Gun (1986) or An Officer and a Gentleman in trying to become a fighter pilot, a female welder in Flashdance transforming into a ballet dancer, and Cocoon's (1985) elderly set overcoming old age. Even The Big Chill (1983) reunion was a rite-of-passage that challenged old classmates to redirect their lives after the suicide of a friend. The Goonies in 1985 and Stand by Me in 1986 were both successful at the box office and went on to be considered classics of the decade. They also both featured a number young actors that would see future success both on the big screen and the small screen.
- Science Fiction: Continuing the 1970s' sci-fi boom was Australian post-apocalyptic Mad Max 2, with a leather-clad outlaw fighting road barbarians in the futuristic desert wasteland. Another futuristic adventure released the same year, Escape from New York, also saw an anti-hero set in a dystopian future. In 1982, yet another film set in a dystopian future, the Tech-noirish Blade Runner starred Harrison Ford as a detective searching for renegade androids. Sci-fi films aimed at younger audiences included the two Star Wars films, The Empire Strikes Back and Return of the Jedi, as well as the Back to the Future trilogy and Steven Spielberg's E.T.. The Star Trek series became a big screen success with four movies being released during the 1980s.
- Sequels: In the late 1970s and early 1980s, a trend emerged toward the release of sequels based on recently successful productions. Among the sequels were Damien: Omen II, Revenge of the Pink Panther, The Final Conflict (a.k.a. Omen III: The Final Conflict), Grease 2, Trail of the Pink Panther, The Great Muppet Caper, Porky's II: The Next Day and Porky's Revenge.
- Sports: Baseball was especially popular on the big screen as evidenced by the releases of The Natural, Bull Durham, Major League, and Field of Dreams. As well as boxing with Raging Bull, Rocky III, and Rocky IV. Though other competitions were represented by the likes of Caddyshack (golf), Chariots of Fire (track), The Color of Money (pool), Hoosiers (basketball), and Over the Top (arm wrestling).
- Thriller: The 1980s saw an immense amount of thriller films, many being of an erotic nature, including Body Heat (1981) and Fatal Attraction (1987). Perhaps two of the most influential examples of 1980s thriller films were David Lynch's bizarre cult classic Blue Velvet (1986), which dealt with the underworld of a seemingly idyllic U.S. suburbia, a subject which has spawned many imitations well into the first decade of the 21st century and Stanley Kubrick's horror/thriller The Shining (1980).
- Western: A stylish form of western was evolving, with films such as Pale Rider, Silverado (both 1985) and Young Guns (1988).

== Content ==
The decade saw an increased amount of nudity in film, as well as the increasing emphasis in the American industry on film franchises; especially in the science fiction, horror, and action genres. Much of the reliance on these effects-driven movies was due in part to the Star Wars films at the advent of this decade and the new cinematic visuals they helped to pioneer.

With the release of 1984's Red Dawn, the PG-13 rating was introduced in the U.S. to accommodate films that straddled the line between PG and R. Which was mainly due to the controversies surrounding the violence of the PG films Indiana Jones and the Temple of Doom and Gremlins from earlier that same year.

Some have considered the 1980s in retrospect as one of the weaker decades for American cinema in terms of the qualities of the films released. Filmmaker Quentin Tarantino has voiced his own view that the 1980s was one of the worst eras for American films. Film critic Kent Jones also shares this opinion. However, film theorist David Bordwell countered this notion, saying that the "megapicture mentality" was already existent in the 1970s, which is evident in the ten highest-grossing films of that decade, as well as with how many of the filmmakers part of New Hollywood were still able to direct many great pictures in the 1980s (Martin Scorsese, Brian de Palma, John Carpenter, etc.).

== Highest-grossing films ==
List of worldwide highest-grossing films
Rank	Title	Studio(s)	Worldwide gross	Year	Ref
1	E.T. the Extra-Terrestrial	Universal Pictures	$792,942,069	1982	
2	Star Wars: Episode V – The Empire Strikes Back	20th Century Fox	$538,375,067	1980	
3	Indiana Jones and the Last Crusade	Paramount Pictures	$474,171,806	1989	
4	Batman	Warner Bros.	$411,348,924	1989	
5	Back to the Future	Universal Pictures	$381,109,762	1985	
6	Star Wars: Episode VI – Return of the Jedi	20th Century Fox	$374,593,074	1983	
7	Top Gun	Paramount Pictures	$357,463,748	1986	
8	Rain Man	Metro-Goldwyn-Mayer	$354,825,435	1988	
9	Raiders of the Lost Ark	Paramount Pictures	$353,988,025	1981	
10	Indiana Jones and the Temple of Doom	Paramount Pictures	$333,080,271	1984	
11	Back to the Future Part II	Universal Pictures	$331,950,002	1989	
12	Who Framed Roger Rabbit	Buena Vista / Touchstone Pictures	$329,803,958	1988	
13	Crocodile Dundee	Paramount Pictures	$328,203,506	1986	
14	Fatal Attraction	Paramount Pictures	$320,099,997	1987	
15	Beverly Hills Cop	Paramount Pictures	$316,300,000	1984	
16	Rambo: First Blood Part II	Carolco Pictures	$300,400,000	1985	
17	Rocky IV	Metro-Goldwyn-Mayer	$300,373,716	1985	
18	Look Who's Talking	TriStar	$296,999,813	1989	
19	Ghostbusters	Columbia Pictures	$296,578,797	1984	
20	Coming to America	Paramount Pictures	$288,752,301	1988	
21	Tootsie	Columbia Pictures	$241,000,000	1982	
22	Crocodile Dundee II	Paramount Pictures	$239,606,210	1988	
23	Dead Poets Society	Buena Vista / Touchstone Pictures	$235,860,116	1989	
24	Lethal Weapon 2	Warner Bros.	$227,853,986	1989	
25	Honey, I Shrunk the Kids	Buena Vista/Disney	$222,724,172	1989	
26	Twins	Universal Pictures	$216,614,388	1988	
27	Ghostbusters II	Columbia Pictures	$215,394,738	1989	
28	Dirty Dancing	Vestron Pictures	$214,600,000	1987	
29	The Gods Must Be Crazy	C.A.T. Films	$200,000,000	1980	
30	Rambo III	Carolco	$189,015,611	1988	
31	The Little Mermaid	Buena Vista/Disney	$184,155,863	1989	
32	A Fish Called Wanda	MGM	$177,889,000	1988	
33	Cocktail	Buena Vista / Touchstone Pictures	$171,504,781	1988	
34	Three Men and a Baby	Buena Vista / Touchstone Pictures	$167,780,960	1987	
35	Born on the Fourth of July	Universal Pictures	$161,001,698	1989	
36	Beverly Hills Cop II	Paramount Pictures	$299,965,036	1987	
37	Gremlins	Warner Bros.	$153,083,102	1984	
38	Big	20th Century Fox	$151,668,774	1988	
39	Die Hard	20th Century Fox	$140,767,956	1988	
40	The Naked Gun: From the Files of Police Squad!	Paramount Pictures	$140,000,000	1988	
41	Platoon	Orion Pictures	$138,530,565	1986	
42	The Karate Kid	Columbia Pictures	$130,000,000	1984	
43	The Karate Kid Part II	Columbia Pictures	$130,000,000	1986	
44	An Officer and a Gentleman	Paramount Pictures	$129,795,554	1982	
45	Gandhi	Goldcrest Films / NFDC India	$127,767,889	1982	
46	Rocky III	Metro-Goldwyn-Mayer	$124,146,897	1982	
47	Good Morning, Vietnam	Buena Vista / Touchstone Pictures	$123,922,370	1987	
48	On Golden Pond	Universal Pictures	$119,285,432	1981	
49	Shaolin Temple	Chung Yuen Motion Picture Company	$111,851,439	1982	(Note: See Shaolin Temple (1982 film) § Box office)
50	Star Trek IV: The Voyage Home	Paramount Pictures	$109,713,132	1986	

In the list, where revenues are equal numbers, the newer films are listed lower, due to inflation making the dollar-amount lower compared to earlier years.

== Lists of films ==
- 1980 in film
- 1981 in film
- 1982 in film
- 1983 in film
- 1984 in film
- 1985 in film
- 1986 in film
- 1987 in film
- 1988 in film
- 1989 in film

== See also ==
- Film, History of film, lists of films
- Popular culture: 1980s in music, 1980s in television
