= Replanting Family Tree =

EP / remix album by Oh Land and Arthur Moon (Note: Arthur Moon is only credited as a lead artist on the Spotify edition of the EP.)
- Released: 18 September 2019
- Genre: Electropop
- Length: 14:00
- Label: Tusk or Tooth
- Producer: Thomas Bartlett

Oh Land chronology
Family Tree (2019)	Replanting Family Tree (2019)	Xtra (2022)

Arthur Moon chronology
Arthur Moon (2019)	Replanting Family Tree (2019)	Back to the Future (2021)

Singles from Replanting Family Tree
- 1. "Salt" Released: 4 September 2019

Replanting Family Tree is a remix extended play by Danish singer-songwriter Oh Land and American musician Arthur Moon. It was released digitally in Denmark on 18 September 2019, through Tusk or Tooth Records. The EP is the companion release to Oh Land's fifth studio album, Family Tree (2019). The former contains four remixes of songs, created by Moon, that originally appeared on the parent album. Additionally, the previously unreleased "When a Hawk Comes By" appears as a bonus track on it, co-written by the sole producer, Thomas Bartlett, and Oh Land's boyfriend, Adnan Zukanovic.

Two weeks prior to the release of Replanting Family Tree, Moon's remix of "Salt" was released as its lead single. Furthermore, the remix was distributed to United States campus radio stations for airplay. The remixes on the EP are electropop tracks and are completely reworked from their original versions, which was Moon's intention. Jared Winkel from River Beats included it on his list of "The Best New Music You Haven't Heard Yet".

== Background and release ==
In 2018, Oh Land confirmed that she would be releasing her fifth studio album in 2019. The project was inspired by several recent events in her personal life, including a divorce from her husband, second pregnancy, and relocation back to Denmark. She began to focus on playing the piano again, resulting in songwriting sessions and a shift in sound and tempofor the album. It was officially announced as Family Tree and released in various countries on 3 May 2019. The album was promoted with various singles as well as Oh Land embarking on a supporting United States promotional concert tour in the fall of 2019.

BlackBook first reported on the release of Replanting Family Tree on 27 August 2019, when they published a review of Arthur Moon's remix of "Salt" in advance. The EP's cover artwork was also unveiled, which was created by the Danish graphic design firm Hvass&Hannibal, a frequent collaborator with Oh Land. Ultimately, it was released for digital download and streaming in Denmark on 18 September 2019, through Tusk or Tooth Records. Outside of Denmark, Replanting Family Tree was self-released by Oh Land to digital retailers in various countries. Oh Land is credited as the primary artist on all editions of the EP, except the Spotify version, where Moon is also credited. American musician Thomas Bartlett solely produced Replanting Family Tree and is credited with co-writing four of the five tracks.

On 27 August 2019, the Arthur Moon remix of "Salt" was announced as the EP's lead single. It was released for digital download and streaming in various countries on 4 September of the same year. In the United States, the remix was distributed to campus radio stations for airplay on 24 September 2019, according to the North American College and Community Radio Chart. The track listing for Replanting Family Tree revealed four remixes of songs, created by Moon, that also appear in their original forms on Family Tree. The "Human Error" remix premiered, in advance, days before the release of the EP. The final song on Replanting Family Tree, "When a Hawk Comes By", is a previously unreleased song that was included as a bonus track.

== Music and songs ==
Replanting Family Tree is an electropop remix EP with an "energetic" and electronic-inspired sound that completely reworks the songs on Family Tree.River Beats' Jared Winkel called the EP a complete rework of Family Tree, which he described as a musical departure from Oh Land's previous works and "far more personal than anything she's ever released". When working on the remixes, Moon was inspired to completely "reimagine" the songs on Family Tree and present them with an electronic-heavy production, unlike their original versions. Regarding the opportunity to work with Oh Land on the project, Moon explained: "It was such a privilege to get to dig into the magical worlds Oh Land and Thomas Bartlett created on these recordings." Oh Land described the concept: "Replanting Family Tree is like the upside down of my album Family Tree. It's got a very electronic and playful vibe which gives the songs a different meaning... New soil, rainwater, sunlight gives an old tree with new roots in my forest."

Replanting Family Tree contains four remixes of songs from the parent album ("Salt", "Open", "Human Error" and "After the Storm") and one original song, "When a Hawk Comes By", which was written by Oh Land, her boyfriend Adnan Zukanovic, and Bartlett. The EP opens with Moon's remix of "Salt", which adds "electro-handclaps, jittery beats, and piercing synth-blasts" to the original composition. Eric Keith from Vinyl Chapters called it a "genre-busting" remix that is a "haunting and inventive piece". Replanting Family Tree proceeds with "Open", a track that deconstructs its original version and is just over two minutes in length. On Family Tree, Bartlett receives a writing credit for "Open", but on Replanting Family Tree, Oh Land is credited as the song's sole writer and composer. The sound of the "Human Error" remix is noticeably "stripped down" compared to its original version. Moon's final Family Tree collaboration is for "After the Storm", which was described as an ambient pop remix about "living in the moment".

== Critical reception ==
Professional ratings
Review scores
Source	Rating
Vinyl Chapters	5/5 stars

Keith called the EP a "refreshing and lush record", and hoped that Oh Land and Moon would collaborate again in the future. He also enjoyed "When a Hawk Comes By", writing that the song was "simply one of the most pleasant sounding things" he had listened to recently. Winkel featured Replanting Family Tree on his semi-regularly published list of "The Best New Music You Haven't Heard Yet"; in his summary of the EP, he described Oh Land's vocals as powerful and commended Moon's ability to reimagine them in a "whole new atmosphere". Barbara Streidl from Bayerischer Rundfunk's Bayern 2 channel reviewed "When a Hawk Comes By" on her weekly playlist in November 2019, giving it 4.5 out of 5 stars.

== Track listing ==
Replanting Family Tree track listing
No.	Title	Writer(s)	Producer(s)	Length
1.	"Salt" (Arthur Moon remix)	Nanna Øland Fabricius; Thomas Bartlett	Bartlett; Arthur Moon^{[a]}	2:15
2.	"Open" (Arthur Moon remix)	Fabricius	Bartlett; Moon^{[a]}	2:13
3.	"Human Error" (Arthur Moon remix)	Fabricius; Bartlett; Adnan Zukanovic	Bartlett; Moon^{[a]}	3:23
4.	"After the Storm" (Arthur Moon remix)	Fabricius; Bartlett	Bartlett; Moon^{[a]}	2:55
5.	"When a Hawk Comes By"	Fabricius; Bartlett; Zukanovic	Bartlett	3:14
Total length:				14:00

Notes:

- ^{^[a]} signifies a remixer
- "When a Hawk Comes By" is listed as a bonus track on every edition of the EP

== Credits and personnel ==
Credits adapted from Spotify.

- Nanna Øland Fabricius – performer, writer
- Arthur Moon – performer (tracks 1–4), remixer (tracks 1–4)
- Thomas Bartlett – writer (tracks 1, 3–5), producer
- Adnan Zukanovic – writer (tracks 2, 5)

== Release history ==
Release dates and formats for Replanting Family Tree
Region	Date	Format(s)	Label	Ref.
Denmark	18 September 2019	Digital download; streaming	Tusk or Tooth	
Various (Note: Various regions excluding Denmark.)	18 September 2019	Digital download; streaming	Self-released	
