= I'd Rather Sing =

Song by Oh Land

Promotional single by Oh Land

from the album Loop Soup
- Released: 19 September 2023
- Length: 3:40
- Label: Tusk or Tooth; Capitol Records Denmark
- Songwriters: Nanna Øland Fabricius; Adnan Zukanovic
- Producer: Adnan Zukanovic

"I'd Rather Sing" is a song by Danish singer and songwriter Oh Land. It is included on her sixth studio album, Loop Soup (2023), where it was released as a promotional single on 19 September 2023 through her Tusk or Tooth label and Capitol Records Denmark. Oh Land wrote the song with her husband, Adnan Zukanovic, also the song's sole producer.

== Background and release ==
Details regarding the release of her sixth studio album, Loop Soup, were first announced on 23 June 2023, of which "I'd Rather Sing" appears as the opening track. The song later received a limited streaming release on 19 September 2023, exclusively through the music website mxdwn.com. On 29 September, the song was made available for digital download and streaming as part of the wide release of the parent album.

"I'd Rather Sing" was written by Oh Land and her husband, Adnan Zukanovic, the song's producer.

== Composition and lyrics ==
It begins with a "pulsating beat" prior to the introduction of Oh Land's vocals.

Lyrically, "I'd Rather Sing" details Oh Land's thoughts on life's and societal expectations, particularly those of an artist thrown into the industry. Regarding her inspiration behind the track, she commented that the song expresses her desire to achieve her "own authentic feeling of happiness," and added: "For me, singing wasn't a choice, it was just something I did more and more and paid attention to because it made me happy." Additionally, she found the lyrics to also represent concerns of students seeking education and become stressed out as a result: "I feel stressed out on the behalf of young people who need to make big educational choices very early and don't get the time it takes to figure out what they're naturally driven towards doing." In the chorus, she repeats "What is it they know that I don't get? / Speaking in a foreign alphabet / I never did, I never did / I'd rather sing instead".

== Critical reception ==
Emily Crerand of mxdwn.com liked the lyrics of "I'd Rather Sing" for "do[ing] a great job of communicating the struggles of an artist in a corporate world". Skyy Rincon from the same website called the song "an entirely climactic, undoubtedly delightful listening experience".

== Release history ==
Release dates and formats for "I'd Rather Sing"
Region	Date	Format(s)	Label	Ref.
Various	19 September 2023	Streaming (via mxdwn.com)	Tusk or Tooth	
Various	29 September 2023	Digital download; streaming	Tusk or Tooth	
