= Xtra (EP) =

EP by Oh Land
- Released: 11 November 2022
- Length: 14:01
- Language: Danish
- Label: Tusk or Tooth; Capitol Records Denmark
- Producer: Oh Land; William Gerdes; Vasco; Adnan Zukanovic

Oh Land chronology
Replanting Family Tree (2019)	Xtra (2022)	Loop Soup (2023)

Singles from Xtra
- 1. "Sådan Ligger Landet" Released: 9 September 2022; 2. "Bad Timing" Released: 21 October 2022

Xtra is the fourth extended play by Danish singer-songwriter Oh Land. It is her first release written entirely in Danish, and was distributed digitally on 11 November 2022 through Tusk or Tooth Records and Capitol Records Denmark. All four of the project's songs are written by the singer and her boyfriend, Adnan Zukanovic. The two, along with William Gerdes and Vasco, are the four producers of the EP.

Xtra was preceded in release by its two singles, "Sådan Ligger Landet" and "Bad Timing". The former song also appears on the Danish television series Min sang til Danmark.

== Background and release ==
Xtra was written entirely in Oh Land's native Danish, becoming her first project to do so. In a 2023 interview with B.T., she explained that ultimately the songs decide what language she writes in, not herself. She clarified, however, her releases in 2023 would be performed in English. The EP was preceded in release by its two singles, "Sådan Ligger Landet" and "Bad Timing". The former was the first song unveiled from Xtra, and was digitally distributed on 9 September 2022. It served as her entry on the Danish television series Min sang til Danmark, where fifteen Danish musicians competed to create an original song to Denmark; she appeared in the series' fourth episode alongside Ankerstjerne and Mekdes. The song's accompanying music video was released two days later. "Bad Timing" was released on 21 October 2022.

== Music and lyrics ==
TecoApple described "Bad Timing" as a danceable electropop song with fluttering synths. Oh Land sings the song's verses in Danish but repeats the line "Bad timing" in English.

== Critical reception ==
Professional ratings
Review scores
Source	Rating
Gaffa	4/6 stars

Adam Bouttai from Gaffa rated Xtra four out of six stars.

== Track listing ==
Xtra track listing
No.	Title	Writer(s)	Producer(s)	Length
1.	"Stille før Du Kom"	Nanna Øland Fabricius; Adnan Zukanovic	Zukanovic; William Gerdes	3:39
2.	"Bad Timing"	Fabricius; Zukanovic	Zukanovic; Vasco	2:28
3.	"Kriger"	Fabricius; Zukanovic	Zukanovic	3:36
4.	"Sådan Ligger Landet"	Fabricius; Zukanovic	Fabricius; Zukanovic	4:18
Total length:				14:01

== Credits and personnel ==
Credits adapted from AllMusic.

- Nanna Øland Fabricius – primary artist, composer, producer (track 4), strings
- William Gerdes – producer (track 1)
- Nick "Vasco" Labajewska Madsen – producer (track 2), synthesizer programming
- Emil Thomsen – mastering engineer
- Adnan Zukanovic – composer, producer (tracks 3, 4), mixing, programmer, piano, synthesizer bass, synthesizer programming, voices

== Release history ==
Release dates and formats for Xtra
Region	Date	Format(s)	Label(s)	Ref.
Various	11 November 2022	Digital download; streaming	Tusk or Tooth; Capitol Records Denmark	
