= Bleeed =

Song by Oh Land

Single by Oh Land

from the album Loop Soup
- Released: 14 April 2023
- Length: 3:08
- Label: Tusk or Tooth; Capitol Records Denmark
- Songwriters: Nanna Øland Fabricius; Lara Andersson; Nick Labajewska Madsen
- Producer: Vasco

Oh Land singles chronology
"Monster" (2022)	"Bleeed" (2023)	"My Freak" (2023)

"Bleeed" is a song by Danish singer and songwriter Oh Land. She wrote the song with Lara Andersson and the song's producer, Nick "Vasco" Labajewska Madsen. It was released on 14 April 2023 through Oh Land's Tusk or Tooth label and Capitol Records Denmark, and appears as the lead single on her upcoming sixth studio album, Loop Soup (2023). The song's lyrical content critiques society's dependence on social media, and she revealed she hopes it helps others questioning their personal phone usage.

== Background and release ==
In 2022, Oh Land released the extended play, Xtra, her first entirely Danish-language extended play. During 2023, she resumed releasing music written in English, remarking that ultimately the songs decide what language she writes in. "Bleeed" was released digitally as a single on 14 April 2023 through Oh Land's Tusk or Tooth record label and Capitol Records Denmark. It was also announced to be a part of her next album, which in June was revealed as her upcoming sixth studio album, Loop Soup (2023). "Bleeed" serves as the album's lead single. Alongside the song's release, she announced a European concert series with dates between October and November 2023.

Oh Land wrote "Bleed" with Lara Andersson and the song's producer, Nick "Vasco" Labajewska Madsen. She performed "Bleed" live for the first time on 19 May during the Rock in Tivoli concert at Tivoli Gardens.

== Composition and lyrics ==
Lyrically, "Bleeed" is a song about love and hate with themes of self-mockery. It primarily discusses her feelings regarding social media, and how constant exposure can result in societal consequences and impact one's mental health. She compares social media to an unhealthy relationship, which stemmed from her realisation that she uses her phone as frequently as she interacts with other people. In an article published by B.T., Oh Land stated she hopes the song helps others determine whether or not their personal media consumption is healthy. Prior to her performance at Tivoli Gardens, she elaborated on the song's meaning further, revealing that "Bleeed" refers to one's attempt to have a dual life via reality and being online, and argues her opinion that social media has too large of a daily presence. The chorus contains the lyric: "Bleed / We're always on each other's feeds / Can someone undo and delete?"

According to Dansende beren's Aernout van Lindt, "Bleeed" has electro influences and a danceable beat, and compared it to the works of Scandinavian singers Tove Lo and Dagny.

== Credits and personnel ==
Credits adapted from AllMusic.

- Nanna Øland Fabricius – primary artist, composer
- Lara Andersson – composer
- Anders Boll – mixing
- Nick "Vasco" Labajewska Madsen – composer, producer
- Emil Thomsen – mastering engineer

== Release history ==
Release dates and formats for "Bleeed"
Region	Date	Format(s)	Label	Ref.
Various	14 April 2023	Digital download; streaming	Tusk or Tooth	
