= Brief Moment (song) =

2019 single by Oh Land

Single by Oh Land

from the album Family Tree
- Released: 22 February 2019
- Genre: Chamber pop
- Length: 3:37
- Label: Tusk or Tooth
- Songwriter(s): Nanna Øland Fabricius; Thomas Bartlett; Adi Zukanovic
- Producer(s): Thomas Bartlett

Oh Land singles chronology
"Human Error" (2019)	"Brief Moment" (2019)	"Kiss in Songs" (2019)

Lyric video
- "Brief Moment" on YouTube

"Brief Moment" is a song by Danish singer and songwriter Oh Land for her fifth studio album, Family Tree (2019). Oh Land wrote the song with her boyfriend Adi Zukanovic and the sole producer, Thomas Bartlett. It was released as the album's second single on 22 February 2019, through Tusk or Tooth Records, and coincided with the announcement of a promotional concert tour for the parent album. The recording process of the song was draining for Oh Land, who requested breaks during sessions to recover emotionally. It is a stripped-down chamber pop song with a piano-led production. Bartlett, Zukanovic, and Hungarian musician Peter Pejtsik all perform piano on the song.

Lyrically, "Brief Moment" refers to a series of emotional events that Oh Land endured in the years leading up to Family Tree in 2019. One music critic compared the lyrics to the words of a diary entry. The song received generally mixed reviews from critics, with some of them describing it as a standout track on the album and others calling the song unfinished. A promotional lyric video for the song was released to Oh Land's YouTube channel on 22 February 2019. She later performed "Brief Moment" live in a self-recorded one-shot video and during promotional concert appearances for Family Tree.

== Background and release ==
Following the release of her fourth studio album Earth Sick in 2014, Oh Land devoted her time to a number of side projects, such as recording the soundtracks for Askepot (2016) and Watermusic (2018), and a rendition of Denmark's national anthem for the 2018 television series The Rain. In 2018, she confirmed that her then-upcoming album was set for release in 2019 and would be inspired by the recent events of her personal life, such as the divorce from her husband, her second pregnancy, and relocating back to Denmark. To initiate songwriting sessions, Oh Land began to focus on playing the piano again, resulting in a sound and tonal shift for the album.

The release of "Brief Moment" came with no prior announcement. In a promotional interview with Qrewcial regarding the release date of Family Tree, Oh Land revealed that while recording songs, such as the title track and "Brief Moment", she would often request time away from the recording studio afterwards in order to recover emotionally. The song was written by Oh Land, her boyfriend Adi Zukanovic, and Thomas Bartlett. Bartlett solely produced the track, while Oh Land received additional credit for creating the melody and lyrics. It was mastered by UE Nastasi at Sterling Sound studios in Edgewater, New Jersey.

"Brief Moment" was released for digital download and streaming in various countries on 22 February 2019, through Tusk or Tooth Records. The song's artwork is a custom, hand-embroidered design that was created by Danish designer Sarah Becker. "Brief Moment" was included as the fourth track on Oh Land's fifth studio album Family Tree, which was released on 3 May 2019. "Brief Moment" serves as the album's second single, following the release of lead single "Human Error" earlier in January 2019. Additionally, she announced a promotional tour for the album on the same day as the single release, consisting of 2019 dates in the United States, United Kingdom, Denmark, and Germany. Oh Land also shared a promotional lyric video for the song to her official YouTube channel on 22 February 2019.

== Composition and lyrics ==
Musically, "Brief Moment" is a stripped-down chamber pop song that is backed by orchestral arrangements. It features Oh Land singing with more refined and matured vocals, as compared to her earlier releases. The song's instrumentation consists of piano, synthesizer, and a complete orchestra, the Choir of the Budapest Art. Bartlett, Zukanovic, and the song's orchestral conductor Peter Pejtsik make up the trio of pianists on the track; Bartlett also plays the synthesizer.

According to its sheet music, "Brief Moment" is set in the time signature of common time, and has a moderate tempo of 124 beats per minute. The song is composed in the key of F major and follows the setup of a verse, followed by chorus-verse-chorus and a post-chorus. "Brief Moment" opens with a choir harmonizing to the chord progression of F-B♭-D#m-G#m. Oh Land spoke about what inspired the beginning of the songwriting process:

Madeleine Fernando from Billboard saw "Brief Moment" as Oh Land addressing the many changes in her personal life over a span of 18 months. She felt the song "channel[ed] her pain, confusion and vulnerability" that developed from her pregnancy, divorce, and relocation to Denmark. Carson Aguilar from Qrewcial stated the song "bridges a gap between the deeply personal and hopeful", and that "its lyrics cut deep". Specifically, the lyrics refer to someone who is entering a new stage of love in a relationship. In response to Oh Land admitting she needed recovery time after writing and recording "Brief Moment", Aguilar insisted that one would "be able to understand why". Ida Rud, writing for Berlingske, equated the opening lyrics ("I don't really like to run / But lately I have found it fun / To sprint around the lakes as if my life depended on it / Just so I could tell you about it") to the content of a young person's diary entry. In the choruses, Oh Land alternates between singing: "Bottom of the blue ocean" and "Patterns in the blue ocean".

== Critical reception ==
"Brief Moment" was met with generally mixed reviews from music critics; some selected it as a highlight on Family Tree and others labeled the song unfinished. Fernando named it a standout song from the album due to "Oh Land's beautiful lyricism and quiet strength". Kristina Grønning, writing for Gaffa, highlighted both "Brief Moment" and "Human Error" for building up the track listing's momentum, calling the rest of the album rather slow-paced. Simon Bækgaard from SoundVenue called Oh Land a good songwriter because of "Brief Moment", noting that she avoids using clichés in her lyrics. Ally Tatosian, from Mxdwn.com, enjoyed the playfulness of the track and noted that the lyrics reveal Oh Land being "as real as possible".

Rud disliked the track, finding it to be inconsistent and believing the usage of a full orchestra is underwhelming. Thomas Treo, from Ekstra Bladet, also provided a negative opinion of the song, writing that its melody feels incomplete and labelling the lyrics a missed opportunity.

== Live performances ==
Oh Land self-recorded a one-shot video of her performing "Brief Moment" as she walked around her Denmark home. In the video, Zukanovic appears playing piano, while Simon Brinck plays guitar, Mika Persdotter plays viola, and Oh Land plays the drums as she sings. The performance was uploaded to Oh Land's YouTube channel on 8 March 2019. Surrounding the release of Family Tree, Oh Land embarked on a promotional concert tour in support of the album. At the annual NorthSide Festival in Aabyhøj, Denmark, Oh Land appeared as a headliner and performed her own, individualized set. The event took place during the first week of August 2019, with Oh Land performing "Brief Moment" in between fellow Family Tree track "Sunlight" and her 2013 single "Renaissance Girls". In her review of the show, Andrea Washuus Bundgaard from Gaffa enjoyed Oh Land's delivery of "Brief Moment", calling it full of grace and highly sincere.

== Credits and personnel ==
Credits adapted from the liner notes of Family Tree.

- Nanna Øland Fabricius – lyrics, melody, music
- Thomas Bartlett – production, additional arrangements, piano, synthesizer
- Adi Zukanovic – music, orchestral arrangements, piano
- UE Nastasi – mastering
- Patrick Dillett – mixing
- Peter Pejtsik – conductor, piano
- Choir of the Budapest Art – orchestra

== Release history ==
Release dates and formats for "Brief Moment"
Region	Date	Format(s)	Label	Ref.
Various	22 February 2019	Digital download; streaming	Tusk or Tooth	
