= 1970s in sports =

== Olympics ==
During the 1970s, the Olympics took place four times, with Munich hosting the games in 1972 and Montreal playing host in 1976. The 1972 Summer games became victim to both terrorism and international controversy with ties to the ongoing Cold War situation. During the games, Palestinian terrorists killed two Israeli athletes and took nine hostages. After a failed rescue attempt, all hostages and all but three of terrorists were killed. The United States-Soviet Union basketball game was also embroiled in controversy. The U.S. basketball Olympic winning streak, which started in 1936, was ended by the Soviet Union team's close victory game.

The U.S. complained about errors in officiating but the victory by the Soviet Union was upheld. Among the 1972 Summer Olympic highlights was the performance of swimmer Mark Spitz, who set seven World Records to win a record seven gold medals in one Olympics, bringing his total to nine. Other notable athletes at the 1972 games were sixteen-year-old Olga Korbut, whose success in women's gymnastics earned three gold medals for the Soviet Union, and British athlete Mary Peters, who took home the gold in the women's pentathlon.

The 1976 Summer games in Montreal marked the first time the Olympic games were held in Canada. Mindful of the tragedy during the 1972 games, security was high during the Montreal games. Due to its policy on apartheid, South Africa was banned from the games. Even so, twenty-two other African countries sat out to protest. The 1976 Summer Olympics were highlighted by the legendary performance of 14-year-old Romanian female gymnast Nadia Comăneci, who scored seven perfect 10s and won 3 gold medals, including the prestigious All Around in women's gymnastics. The performance by Comăneci also marked the rise of legendary women's gymnastics coach Béla Károlyi, who went on to coach the U.S. team in both the 1988 and 1992 summer Olympic games. The 1976 Summer games also featured the strong U.S. boxing team, which consisted of Sugar Ray Leonard, Leon Spinks, Michael Spinks, Leo Randolph and Howard Davis Jr. The team won five gold medals and was arguably the greatest Olympic boxing team ever. In wrestling, Dan Gable won the gold medal in the 149-pound weight class without having a single point scored against him. Amazingly, this was done with a painful shoulder injury.

The Winter Olympics were held in Sapporo, Japan, in 1972 and Innsbruck, Austria, in 1976. Originally, Denver, Colorado, was supposed to host the '76 games, but voters rejected a plan to finance the venues needed and the IOC chose Innsbruck instead; the city had already had venues from hosting the 1964 Winter Olympics.

== By year ==
- 1979 in sports – Sugar Ray Leonard wins his first world boxing title.
- 1978 in sports – First Ironman Triathlon. Johan Cruyff pulls out of the World Cup for personal reasons. Affirmed becomes the 11th thoroughbred to win the U.S. Triple Crown.
- 1977 in sports – Pelé plays the last game of his professional career in a friendly between the New York Cosmos and Santos FC; Red Rum wins third Grand National.
- 1976 in sports – Nadia Comăneci earns the first perfect score in the history of Olympic gymnastics. Super Bowl X saw the Pittsburgh Steelers repeat as world champions.
- 1975 in sports – First Cricket World Cup; Muhammad Ali beat Joe Frazier in the Thrilla In Manila; Pele came out of retirement to play for the New York Cosmos and brought U.S. Soccer into American mainstream.
- 1974 in sports – The Rumble in the Jungle boxing match; Gerd "der Bomber" Müller scores his 14th World Cup goal, a then record, as West Germany win the World Cup; Hank Aaron breaks Babe Ruth's career home run record
- 1973 in sports – Ajax win third consecutive European Cup; Secretariat wins the Triple Crown of United States Thoroughbred Racing; "Battle of the Sexes" tennis match between Billie Jean King and Bobby Riggs.
- 1972 in sports – USSR beat USA in last second of the Olympic basketball final; Israeli athletes killed by Palestinian terrorists at the same Olympics; Canada defeats U.S.S.R. in Summit Series - Paul Henderson scores winning goal.
- 1971 in sports – Richard Petty wins the Daytona 500 and the NASCAR Championship; Second Ibrox disaster. 1971 South Africa rugby union tour of Australia causes protest all over Australia; British and Irish Lions defeat All Blacks for the first time in a series.
- 1970 in sports – Nijinsky II won the Triple Crown of British Thoroughbred Racing. The Marshall University football team is killed in a plane crash. The National and American Football Leagues merge to become one 26-team mega-league; Muhammad Ali returns to boxing after a three-and-a-half-year exile for refusing to go to fight in the Vietnam War to fight and defeat Jerry Quarry by a third-round TKO.
