= Family Tree (Oh Land album) =

Studio album by Oh Land
- Released: 3 May 2019
- Recorded: 2018–2019
- Length: 40:19
- Label: Tusk or Tooth
- Producer: Thomas Bartlett

Oh Land chronology
Watermusic (2018)	Family Tree (2019)	Replanting Family Tree (2019)

Singles from Family Tree
- 1. "Human Error" Released: 4 January 2019; 2. "Brief Moment" Released: 22 February 2019; 3. "Kiss in Songs" Released: 22 March 2019

Family Tree is the fifth studio album by Danish singer and songwriter Oh Land. It was released by Tusk or Tooth Records on 3 May 2019. "Human Error" was released as the album's lead single on 4 January 2019. "Brief Moment", the album's second single, was distributed to online music retailers on 22 February 2019. A remix of "Salt" produced by Arthur Moon was released to streaming services in a single format on 4 September 2019.

== Track listing ==
Family Tree – Standard edition
No.	Title	Writer(s)	Producer(s)	Length
1.	"Family Tree"	Nanna Øland Fabricius; Thomas Bartlett	Bartlett	3:57
2.	"Human Error"	Fabricius; Adnan Zukanovic; Bartlett	Bartlett	4:04
3.	"Kiss in Songs"	Fabricius; Bartlett	Bartlett	4:12
4.	"Brief Moment"	Fabricius; Zukanovic; Bartlett	Bartlett	3:37
5.	"Make My Trouble Beautiful"	Fabricius; Bartlett	Bartlett	3:02
6.	"Coma"	Fabricius; Bartlett	Bartlett	2:01
7.	"Salt"	Fabricius; Bartlett	Bartlett	2:50
8.	"Sunlight"	Fabricius; Dan Carey; Bartlett	Bartlett	3:16
9.	"Speak to Me with Love"	Fabricius; Bartlett	Bartlett	3:07
10.	"Someone I Can Be Alone With"	Fabricius; Zukanovic; Bartlett	Bartlett	3:20
11.	"Open"	Fabricius; Bartlett	Bartlett	3:13
12.	"After the Storm"	Fabricius; Bartlett	Bartlett	3:40
Total length:				40:19

== Charts ==
Chart (2019)	Peak position
Danish Albums (Hitlisten)	35

== Release history ==
Release dates and formats for Family Tree
Region	Date	Format(s)	Label	Ref.
Various	3 May 2019	CD	Tusk or Tooth	
Various	3 May 2019	Digital download; streaming	Tusk or Tooth	
Various	3 May 2019	LP	Tusk or Tooth	
