= 1960s in film =

The decade of the 1960s in film involved many significant films.

== Trends ==
- Historical drama films continued to include epic films, in the style of Ben-Hur from 1959, with Spartacus (1960) and Cleopatra (1963), but also evolving with 20th-century settings, such as The Guns of Navarone (1961), Lawrence of Arabia (1962), and Doctor Zhivago (1965).
- Psychological horror films extended, beyond the stereotypical monster films of Dracula/Frankenstein or Wolfman, to include more twisted films, such as Psycho (1960) and Roger Corman's Poe adaptations for American International Pictures as well as British companies Hammer Horror and Amicus Productions. Other European filmmakers like Mario Bava directed many notable horror films.
- Comedy films became more elaborate, such as The Pink Panther (1963), The President's Analyst (1967), or A Funny Thing Happened on the Way to the Forum (1966). Breakfast at Tiffany's (1961) elevated the concept of a comedy-drama, where the subtle comedy conceals the harsher elements of the drama beneath, and Stanley Kubrick's Dr. Strangelove (1964) set a new standard for satire by turning a story about nuclear holocaust into a sophisticated black comedy.
- Beyond the trenchcoat and film noir, spy films expanded with worldly settings and hi-tech gadgets, such as the James Bond films Dr. No (1962) or Goldfinger (1964) and Thunderball (1965). This Spy mania extended throughout the world with many countries notably Italy and Spain producing many of their own fantastical spy films.
- Similar to spy films, the heist or caper film included worldly settings and hi-tech gadgets, as in the original Ocean's Eleven (1960), Topkapi (1964) or The Thomas Crown Affair (1968).
- The spaghetti westerns (made in Italy and Spain), were typified by Clint Eastwood films, such as For a Few Dollars More (1965) or The Good, the Bad and the Ugly (1966). Several other American and Italian actors were also prominent in such westerns including Lee Van Cleef and Franco Nero.
- Science-fiction or fantasy films employed a wider range of special effects, as in the original of The Time Machine (1960) and Mysterious Island (1961), or with animated aliens or mythical creatures, as in the Harryhausen animation for Jason and the Argonauts (1963) and One Million Years B.C. (1966). Some extensive sets were built to simulate alien worlds or zero-gravity chambers, as in space-station and spaceship sets for the epic 2001: A Space Odyssey (1968), the psychedelic, space settings for the erotic Barbarella (1968), and with ape-city in the original Planet of the Apes (1968). Russian fairy-tale fantasy was also prominent with the likes of Aleksandr Rou directing many such films.
- The highly-influential science-fiction films Alphaville (1965) and 2001: A Space Odyssey (1968) explored the concept of a malign artificial intelligence, a theme which later science fiction culture would develop.

Beginning in the middle of the decade due to the start of the cultural revolution and the abolition of the Hays Code (which had largely been abandoned at the start of the decade), films became increasingly experimental and daring and were taking shape of what was to define the latter half of the decade as well as the 1970s.

== Lists of films ==
- 1960 in film
- 1961 in film
- 1962 in film
- 1963 in film
- 1964 in film
- 1965 in film
- 1966 in film
- 1967 in film
- 1968 in film
- 1969 in film

== See also ==
- Film, History of film, Lists of films
- Popular culture: 1960s in music, 1960s in sports, 1960s in television
