= Post-chorus =

Song section

In music, particularly Western popular music, a post-chorus (or postchorus) is a section that appears after the chorus. The term can be used generically for any section that comes after a chorus, but more often refers to a section that has similar character to the chorus, but is distinguishable in close analysis. The concept of a post-chorus has been particularly popularized and analyzed by music theorist Asaf Peres, who is followed in this article.

== Characterization ==
Characterizations of post-chorus vary, but are broadly classed into simply a second chorus (in Peres's terms, a detached postchorus) or an extension of the chorus (in Peres's terms, an attached postchorus). Some restrict "post-chorus" to only cases where it is an extension of a chorus (attached postchorus), and do not consider the second part of two-part choruses (detached postchorus) as being a "post"-chorus.

As with distinguishing the pre-chorus from a verse, it can be difficult to distinguish the post-chorus from the chorus. In some cases they appear separately – for example, the post-chorus only appears after the second and third chorus, but not the first – and thus are clearly distinguishable. In other cases they always appear together, and thus a "chorus + post-chorus" can be considered a subdivision of the overall chorus, rather than an independent section.

Characterization of a post-chorus varies, beyond "comes immediately after the chorus"; Peres characterizes it by two conditions: it maintains or increases sonic energy, otherwise it is a bridge or verse; and contains a melodic hook (vocal or instrumental), otherwise it is a transition.

== Examples ==
Detached post-choruses typically have distinct melody and lyrics from the chorus:

- Chandelier (Sia, 2014): the chorus begins and ends with "I'm gonna swing from the chandelier / From the chandelier", while the post-chorus repeats instead "holding on", in "I'm holding on for dear life" and "I'm just holding on for tonight", and has a new melody, but the same chord progression as the chorus.

Lyrics of attached post-choruses typically repeat the hook/refrain from the chorus, with little additional content, often using vocables like "ah" or "oh". Examples include:

- "Umbrella" (Rihanna, 2007): the chorus begins "When the sun shine, we shine together" and run through "You can stand under my umbrella / You can stand under my umbrella, ella, ella, eh, eh, eh", which is followed by three more repetitions of "Under my umbrella, ella, ella, eh, eh, eh", the last one adding another "eh, eh-eh". Here the division between chorus and post-chorus is blurred, as the "ella, ella" begins in the chorus, and was a play on the reverb effect.
- "Shape of You" (Ed Sheeran, 2017): the chorus runs "I'm in love with the shape of you ... Every day discovering something brand new / I'm in love with your body", and the post-chorus repeats vocables and the hook "Oh—I—oh—I—oh—I—oh—I / I'm in love with your body", then repeats the end of the chorus, switching "your body" to "the shape of you": "Every day discovering something brand new / I'm in love with the shape of you"
- "Girls Like You" (Maroon 5, 2018): the chorus runs "'Cause girls like you ... I need a girl like you, yeah, yeah ... I need a girl like you, yeah, yeah", and the post-chorus repeats the hook with added "yeah"s: "Yeah, yeah, yeah, yeah, yeah, yeah / I need a girl like you, yeah, yeah / Yeah yeah yeah, yeah, yeah, yeah / I need a girl like you".

Hybrids are also common (Peres: hybrid postchorus), where the post-chorus keeps the hook from the chorus (like an attached postchorus), but introduces some additional content (hook or melody, like a detached postchorus).
