= 1970s in film =

The decade of the 1970s in film involved many significant developments in world cinema.

== Trends ==
=== Asian cinema ===
An Asian cinema touchstone beginning in the early 1970s was traditional Hong Kong martial arts films, which sparked a greater interest in Chinese martial arts around the world. Martial arts film's popularity was elevated to a whole new level largely due to its biggest icon, Bruce Lee. He became famous for playing Kato in the television series The Green Hornet during the 1960s. When he returned to Hong Kong, Lee starred in three films that shot him to stardom all over Asia, The Big Boss (1971), Fist of Fury (1972) and Way of the Dragon (1972). After the kung fu film Five Fingers of Death (1972), starring Indonesian-born actor Lo Lieh, topped the North American box office in 1973, this paved the way for Lee's The Big Boss and Fist of Fury topping the US box office. Lee achieved his greatest global stardom with his last completed film, and the first kung fu film to be produced by a Hollywood studio, Enter the Dragon (1973). This led to a "chopsocky" kung fu craze, while Lee's death shortly before the film's release resulted in a wave of "Bruceploitation" films in Hong Kong cinema. The latter trend eventually ended in 1978 when Jackie Chan and Sammo Hung popularized the kung fu comedy subgenre with Snake in the Eagle's Shadow, Enter the Fat Dragon, and Drunken Master; finally allowing the industry to move on and evolve again.

South Asian cinema of the 1970s catered to the rising working-class fantasies and struggles. In the Bollywood cinema of India, this was epitomized by the films written by Salim–Javed and starring Amitabh Bachchan. They began the genre of gritty, violent, Bombay underworld crime films in the 1970s, with films such as Zanjeer (1973) and Deewaar (1975). These films portrayed adventurous plots and presented the young working-class man from the slums as an "angry young man". The women on the other hand were shown as ones who have adopted western values and outfits especially by heroines like Parveen Babi (who was featured on the cover of Time magazine for a story on Bollywood's success) and Zeenat Aman. However towards the very end of the 1970s, especially after the steep rise in land prices in urban areas and the decline in employment security, the heroines were seen more often as saree-women striving to have a prosperous middle-class family especially heroines like Jaya Prada and Hema Malini. In this way, the cinema of Asian region becomes a sociological statement of the social-economic times of the region and its people. In Malayalam cinema, Adoor Gopalakrishnan made Swayamvaram in 1972, which got wide critical acclaim. This was followed by the film Nirmalyam by M. T. Vasudevan Nair in 1973.

=== European cinema ===
In European cinema, the failure of the Prague Spring brought about nostalgic motion pictures reminiscent of the ones that celebrate the 1970s itself. These films expressed a yearning and as a premonition to the decade and its dreams. The Hungarian director István Szabó made the motion picture Szerelmesfilm (1970), which is a nostalgic portrayal and a premonition of the fading of the young 1970s ethos of change and a friendlier social structure. The Italian director Bernardo Bertolucci made the motion picture The Conformist (1970). German films after the war asked existential questions especially the works of Rainer Fassbinder. The films of the Swedish director Ingmar Bergman reached a new level of expression in motion pictures like Cries and Whispers (1973). Young German directors made films that came to be known as the German new wave. It was the voice of a new generation that had grown up after the second world war. These included directors like Wim Wenders, Hans-Jürgen Syberberg and Werner Herzog.

=== North American cinema ===
The decade opened with Hollywood facing a financial slump, reflecting the monetary woes of the nation as a whole during the first half of the decade. Despite this, the 1970s proved to be a benchmark decade in the development of cinema, both as an art form and as a business. With young filmmakers taking greater risks and restrictions regarding language and sexuality lifting, New Hollywood produced some of the most critically acclaimed and financially successful films since the "golden era" of classical American cinema.

In the years previous to 1970, Hollywood had begun to cater to the younger generation with films such as The Graduate. This proved a folly when anti-war films like R. P. M. and The Strawberry Statement became major box-office flops. Even solid films with bankable stars, like the Pearl Harbor epic Tora! Tora! Tora!, flopped, leaving studios in dire straits financially. Unable to repay financiers, studios began selling off land, furniture, clothing, and sets acquired over years of production. Nostalgic fans bid on merchandise and collectibles ranging from Judy Garland's sparkling red shoes to MGM's own back lots.

More of the successful films were those based in the harsh truths of war, rather than the excesses of the 1960s. Films like the Francis Ford Coppola-scripted Patton, starring George C. Scott as the World War II general, and Robert Altman's MASH, about a Korean War field hospital, were major box-office draws in 1970. Honest, old-fashioned films like Summer of '42, and the Erich Segal adaptation, Love Story, were commercial and critical hits. (Love Story and "Summer" remain, as of 2005, two of the most successful films in Hollywood history. "Summer", costing US$1,000,000, brought in $25,000,000 at the box office, while "Love Story", with a budget of $2,200,000, earned $106,400,000).

One of the most insightful films of the decade came from the mind of a Hollywood outsider, Czech director Miloš Forman, whose Taking Off became a bold reflection of life at the beginning of the 1970s. The 1971 film satirized the American middle class, following a young girl who runs away from home, leaving her parents free to explore life for the first time in years. While the film was never given a wide release in America, it became a major critical achievement both in America and around the world (garnering the film high honors at the Cannes Film Festival and several BAFTA Award nominations).

Sean Connery returned to the role of James Bond in 1971 in Diamonds Are Forever after George Lazenby filled the role in 1969. Roger Moore succeeded Connery in 1973 with an adaptation of Ian Fleming's Live and Let Die which was the most successful of his Bond films in terms of admissions. Live and Let Die was followed by an adaptation of The Man with the Golden Gun in 1974, which at the time garnered the lowest box office taking of any Bond film before it. After its release Harry Saltzman co-owner of Danjaq with Albert R. Broccoli sold his half to United Artists causing a three-year gap until the next Bond film, the longest gap since the start of the franchise in 1962. The series picked up again in 1977 with The Spy Who Loved Me and ended the decade with Moonraker in 1979, which was the highest grossing Bond film (not adjusting for inflation) of all time until GoldenEye in 1995.

An adaptation of an Arthur Hailey novel would prove to be one of the most notable films of 1970, and would set the stage for a major trend in 1970s cinema. The film, Airport, featured a complex plot, characters, and an all-star cast of Hollywood A-listers and legends. Airport followed an airport manager trying to keep a fictional Chicago airport operational during a blizzard, as well as a bomb plot to blow up an airplane. The film was a major critical and financial success, helping pull Universal Studios into the black for the year. The film earned senior actress Helen Hayes an Oscar for Best Supporting Actress and garnered many other nominations in both technical and talent categories. The success of the film launched several other disaster films, many of which following the same blueprint of major stars, a melodramatic script, and great suspense.

Three Airport sequels followed in 1974, 1977, and 1979, each successor making less money than the last. 1972 brought The Poseidon Adventure, which starred a young Gene Hackman leading an all-star cast to safety in a capsized luxury liner. The film earned an Academy Award for visual effects (and Best Original Song for "The Morning After"), as well as numerous nominations, including one for its notable supporting star, Shelley Winters, but its sequel in 1979 was far less successful. The Towering Inferno teamed Steve McQueen and Paul Newman against a fire in a San Francisco skyscraper. The film cost a whopping $14 million to produce (expensive for its time), and won Academy Awards for Cinematography, Film Editing, and Best Original Song. The same year, the epic Earthquake featured questionable effects (camera shake and models) to achieve a destructive 9.9 earthquake in Los Angeles. Despite this, the film was one of the most successful of its time, earning $80 million at box office. By the late 1970s, the novelty had worn off and the disasters had become less exciting. 1977 brought a terrorist targeting a Rollercoaster, 1978 a Swarm of bees, and a less-than-threatening Meteor in 1979.

The early 1970s also brought a rebirth of gritty crime film, three years after the influential Bullitt. William Friedkin's The French Connection, starring Gene Hackman as a drug detective and Sidney Lumet's Serpico, starring Al Pacino in the true-life story of an honest cop who fought corruption, were two of the most famous ones. Films like Get Carter featured gratuitous nudity, while Stanley Kubrick's groundbreaking A Clockwork Orange featured much physical and sexual violence to complement its complex story. African American filmmakers also found success in the 1970s with such hits as Shaft and Sweet Sweetback's Baadasssss Song. Like other sequels in the 1970s, Shaft went on to have two more adventures, each less successful than the last.

An adaptation of a Mario Puzo novel, The Godfather, was a box-office and critical success in 1972. The three-hour epic followed a Mafia boss, played by Marlon Brando, through his life of crime. Beyond the violence and drama were themes of love, pride, and greed. The Godfather went on to earn $134 million at American box office, and $245 million throughout the world, becoming the highest-grossing film of all time. It won Academy Awards for Best Picture, Best Actor, and Best Screenplay. Its director Francis Ford Coppola was passed over in favor of Bob Fosse and his musical, Cabaret, which also earned an Oscar for its star, Liza Minnelli. The Godfather Part II followed in 1974, with roughly the same principal cast and crew, earning Oscars for star Robert De Niro, its director, composer, screenwriters and art directors. The film also earned the Best Picture Oscar for that year.

Not all of the "street smart" urban related films were 100% live action. Director Ralph Bakshi released the first animated full-length feature specifically oriented towards adults (Fritz the Cat) then moved on to two other features that dealt with the mafia and other ethnic-related urban issues. Both Heavy Traffic and Coonskin would prove that this kind of material could be handled effectively in the animation genre. Bakshi would later produce fantasy oriented films (Wizards and The Lord of the Rings) before the decade ended.

Inaugurated by the 1969 release of Andy Warhol's Blue Movie, the phenomenon of adult erotic films being publicly discussed by celebrities (like Johnny Carson and Bob Hope), and taken seriously by critics (like Roger Ebert), a development referred to, by Ralph Blumenthal of The New York Times, as "porno chic", and later known as the Golden Age of Porn, began, for the first time, in modern American culture. According to award-winning author Toni Bentley, Radley Metzger's 1976 film The Opening of Misty Beethoven, based on the play Pygmalion by George Bernard Shaw (and its derivative, My Fair Lady), and due to attaining a mainstream level in storyline and sets, is considered the "crown jewel" of this 'Golden Age'.

In the middle 1970s, films began to also reflect the disenfranchisement brought by the excesses of the past twenty years. A deeply unsettling look at alienation and city life, Martin Scorsese's Taxi Driver earned international praise, first at the Cannes Film Festival and then at the Academy Awards, where it was nominated for Best Leading Actor (Robert De Niro), Best Supporting Actress (Jodie Foster), Best Score (Bernard Herrmann), and Best Picture. All the President's Men dealt with the impeachment of Richard Nixon, while Lumet's Network portrayed greed and narcissism in both American society and television media. The film won Oscars for Best Actor (Peter Finch), Best Actress (Faye Dunaway), Best Supporting Actress (Beatrice Straight), and Best Screenplay (Paddy Chayefsky). Thanks to a stellar cast, experienced director, and a poignant story, Network became one of the largest critical successes of 1976. Another film, Rocky, about a clubhouse boxer (played by Sylvester Stallone) who is granted a world championship title fight won the Best Picture Academy Award that year. The film also became a major commercial success and spawned four sequels through the rest of the 1970s and 1980s.

Throughout the 1970s, the horror film developed into a lucrative genre of film. It began in 1973 with the terrifying The Exorcist, directed by William Friedkin and starring the young Linda Blair. The film saw massive success, and the first of several sequels was released in 1977. 1976 brought the equally creepy suspense thriller, Marathon Man, about a man who becomes the target of a former Nazi dentist's torment after his brother dies. The same year, the Devil himself made an appearance in The Omen, about the spawn of Satan. 1978's Halloween was a precursor to the "slasher" films of the 1980s and 1990s with its psychopathic Michael Myers. Cult horror films were also popular in the 1970s, such as Wes Craven's early gore films Last House on the Left and The Hills Have Eyes, as well as Tobe Hooper's The Texas Chain Saw Massacre.

The blockbuster was born in 1975. While The Exorcist was among the top five grossing films of the 1970s, the first film given the blockbuster distinction was 1975's Jaws. Released on June 20, the film about a series of horrific deaths related to a massive great white shark was director Steven Spielberg's first big-budget Hollywood production, coming in at $9 million in cost. The film slowly grew in ticket sales and became one of the most profitable films of its time, ending with a $260 million gross in the United States alone. The film won Academy Awards for its skillful editing, chilling score, and sound recording. It was also nominated for Best Picture that year, though it lost to Miloš Forman's One Flew Over the Cuckoo's Nest (which also won acting awards for Jack Nicholson and Louise Fletcher). It spawned the successful sequel, Jaws 2 in 1978, which featured the same cast, but without Steven Spielberg. Another tailor-made blockbuster, Dino De Laurentiis' King Kong was released, but to less than stellar success. King Kong did mark the first time a film was booked to theaters before a release date, a common practice today.

The massive success of Jaws was eclipsed just two years later by another legendary blockbuster and film franchise. The George Lucas science-fiction film Star Wars hit theater screens in May 1977, and became a major hit, growing in ticket sales throughout the summer and the rest of the year. In time earning some $460 million, the good versus evil fantasy set in space was not soon surpassed. The film's breathtaking visual effects won an Academy Award. The film also won for John Williams's uplifting score, as well as art direction, costume design, film editing, and sound. Star Wars effectively removed any specter of studio bankruptcy that had haunted the studios since early in the decade. When a television film, Star Wars Holiday Special, was released as a spin-off from Star Wars in 1978; it failed to receive the status of the original film, and was deemed a flop. It would be two years until the Star Wars series would be revived with The Empire Strikes Back. Another success in visual effects came the same year as Star Wars, with Spielberg's Close Encounters of the Third Kind, another blockbuster and alien contact set in the wilderness. For the picture, Spielberg received his first Oscar nomination for directing. A year later the most iconic superhero was brought to the screen in Superman, who was portrayed by classically trained actor Christopher Reeve. It was met by resounding praise for strong performances and its epic scope which resulted in numerous sequels and is regarded as one of the greatest superhero films ever made, beginning a new era of superhero films.

The success of Woody Allen's Annie Hall in 1977 stirred a new trend in filmmaking. Annie Hall, a love story about a depressed comedian and a free-spirited woman, was followed with more sentimental films, including Neil Simon's The Goodbye Girl, An Unmarried Woman starring Jill Clayburgh, the autobiographical Lillian Hellman story, Julia, starring Jane Fonda and Vanessa Redgrave, and 1978's Heaven Can Wait and International Velvet.

Younger audiences were also beginning to be the focus of cinema, after the huge blockbusters that had attracted them back to the theater. John Travolta became popular in the pop-culture landmark films, Saturday Night Fever, which introduced Disco to middle America, and Grease, which recalled the world of the 1950s. Comedy was also given new life in the irreverent Animal House, set on a college campus during the 1960s. Up in Smoke, starring Cheech & Chong, was another irreverent comedy about marijuana use became popular among teenagers. The new television comedy program, "Saturday Night Live", launched the careers of several of its comedians, such as Chevy Chase, who co-starred in the 1978 hit Foul Play with Goldie Hawn.

The decade closed with two films chronicling the Vietnam War, Michael Cimino's The Deer Hunter and Francis Ford Coppola's Apocalypse Now. Both films focused on the horrors of war and the psychological damage caused by such horrors. Christopher Walken and director Michael Cimino earned Oscars for their work on the film, which earned a Best Picture Academy Award. Robert De Niro and Meryl Streep were also nominated for their work in The Deer Hunter. Apocalypse Now won for cinematography and sound, and earned nominations for Robert Duvall and Coppola. Hal Ashby's Coming Home portrayed life for Vietnam veterans. Actor Jon Voight won an Academy Award for his role in the film. In this decade there was also an emergence of B-movies featuring Vietnam veterans with an emphasis on action, violence, and revenge, which belong to the exploitation subgenre called "vetsploitation."

1979 saw the poignant Kramer vs. Kramer, the inspiring Norma Rae, and the nuclear thriller, The China Syndrome. Alien scared summer film-going audiences of 1979 with its horrible monster from outer space, achieving similar success that Jaws had seen four years earlier. Meanwhile, The Onion Field and ...And Justice for All focused on the failures of the American judicial system. The year ended with Hal Ashby's subtle black comedy Being There and The Muppet Movie, a family film based on the Jim Henson puppet characters.

== Highest-grossing films (United States and Canada) ==
All figures are for the United States and Canada. Some figures * are for rentals accruing to the distributor, not total box office gross.

List of domestic highest-grossing films in the United States and Canada
Rank	Title	Studio(s)	Domestic gross	Year	Ref
1	Star Wars	20th Century Fox	$221,280,994	1977	
2	Superman	Warner Bros.	$134,218,018	1978	
3	The Godfather	Paramount Pictures	$133,698,921	1972	
4	Jaws	Universal Pictures	$133,400,000	1975	
5	Grease	Paramount Pictures	$132,472,560	1978	
6	Smokey and the Bandit	Universal Pictures	$126,737,428	1977	
7	Animal House	Universal Pictures	$120,091,123	1978	
8	Close Encounters of the Third Kind	Columbia Pictures	$116,395,460	1977	
9	Kramer vs. Kramer	Columbia Pictures	$106,260,000	1979	
10	Enter the Dragon	Golden Harvest / Warner Bros.	$100,000,000	1973	
11	Saturday Night Fever	Paramount Pictures	$94,213,184	1977	
12	The Exorcist	Warner Bros.	$88,500,000	1973	
13	The Amityville Horror	American International Pictures	$86,432,520	1979	
14	Every Which Way but Loose	Warner Bros.	$85,196,485	1978	
15	Rocky II	United Artists	$85,182,160	1979	
16	The Way of the Dragon	Golden Harvest	$85,000,000	1973	
17	Apocalypse Now	United Artists	$83,471,511	1979	
18	The Goodbye Girl	Warner Bros.	$82,000,470	1977	
19	Star Trek: The Motion Picture	Paramount Pictures	$82,258,456	1979	
20	Heaven Can Wait	Paramount Pictures	$81,640,278	1978	
21	Alien	20th Century Fox	$80,931,801	1979	
22	The Sting	Universal Pictures	$79,000,000	1973	
23	Hooper	Warner Bros.	$78,000,000	1978	
24	Jaws 2	Universal Pictures	$77,737,272	1978	
25	Up in Smoke	Paramount Pictures	$76,000,000	1978	
26	10	Warner Bros.	$74,865,517	1979	
27	The Jerk	Universal Pictures	$73,691,419	1979	
28	Moonraker	United Artists	$70,308,099	1979	
29	The Muppet Movie	Associated Film Distribution	$65,200,000	1979	
30	One Flew Over the Cuckoo's Nest	United Artists / Fantasy Films	$59,200,000	1975	
31	Rocky	United Artists	$55,900,000	1976	
32	American Graffiti	Universal Pictures	$55,900,000	1973	
33	A Bridge Too Far	United Artists	$50,750,000	1977	
34	Love Story	Paramount Pictures	$50,000,000	1970	
35	The Towering Inferno	20th Century Fox / Warner Bros.	$50,000,000	1974	
36	Revenge of the Pink Panther	United Artists	$49,579,269	1978	
37	The Deer Hunter	Universal Pictures	$48,979,328	1978	
38	The Godfather Part II	Paramount Pictures	$47,542,841	1974	
39	The Deep	Columbia Pictures	$47,346,365	1977	
40	The Spy Who Loved Me	United Artists	$46,838,673	1977	
41	Blazing Saddles	Warner Bros.	$45,200,000	1974	
42	Airport	Universal Pictures	$44,500,000	1970	
43	The Poseidon Adventure	20th Century Fox	$42,000,000	1972	
44	Oh, God!	Warner Bros.	$41,687,243	1977	
45	Fiddler on the Roof	United Artists / The Mirisch Production Company	$40,500,000	1971	
46	Young Frankenstein	20th Century Fox	$38,800,000	1974	
47	Annie Hall	United Artists	$38,251,425	1977	
48	A Star Is Born	Warner Bros.	$37,100,000	1976	
49	King Kong	Paramount Pictures	$36,900,000	1976	
50	Earthquake	Universal Pictures	$36,300,000	1974	

== Lists of films ==
- 1970 in film
- 1971 in film
- 1972 in film
- 1973 in film
- 1974 in film
- 1975 in film
- 1976 in film
- 1977 in film
- 1978 in film
- 1979 in film

== See also ==
- Film, History of film, Lists of films
- Popular culture: 1970s in music, 1970s in sports, 1970s in television
