= Human Error (song) =

Single by Oh Land

from the album Family Tree
- Released: 4 January 2019
- Length: 4:04
- Label: Tusk or Tooth
- Songwriter(s): Nanna Øland Fabricius; Thomas Bartlett; Adnan Zukanovic
- Producer(s): Thomas Bartlett

Oh Land singles chronology
"Aabne Hjerter" (2015)	"Human Error" (2019)	"Brief Moment" (2019)

"Human Error" is a song by Danish singer-songwriter Oh Land, taken from her fifth studio album Family Tree (2019). It was released as the album's lead single on 4 January 2019. It was written by the singer, Thomas Bartlett, and Adnan Zukanovic, with Bartlett serving as producer. The song was first revealed in December 2018 when she uploaded an acoustic version of the song to her YouTube account.

== Background and release ==
Oh Land's then-untitled fifth studio album was scheduled for release in 2018, according to the singer. The release date was then pushed back to 2019, which was revealed in an interview with Rolling Stone magazine. During the time period leading up to the release, Oh Land worked on several side projects, such as producing the soundtrack album Watermusic (2018) and recording "Der er et yndigt land", Denmark's national anthem. Oh Land first uploaded a live acoustic performance of "Human Error" onto her official YouTube account on 8 December 2018. The song was later released to various online music retailers via digital download on 4 January 2019 as the lead single from her fifth album, Family Tree.

== Composition and lyrics ==
"Human Error" was written by Oh Land, Thomas Bartlett, and Adnan Zukanovic. Production was also handled by Bartlett.

== Critical reception ==
Madeleine Fernando from Billboard named "Human Error", in addition to the second single "Brief Moment" a standout song from Family Tree for displaying "Oh Land's beautiful lyricism and quiet strength".
